= Pension Clausewitz =

Former brothel in West Berlin, Germany

- Location of Pension Clausewitz in Berlin
- Address: 4 Clausewitzstraße, Charlottenburg, Berlin
- Coordinates: 52.5010672°N 13.3085892°E
- Owner: Hans Helmcke
- Type: Luxury Brothel

Construction
- Opened: 1947
- Closed: 1966

Pension Clausewitz was a luxury West Berlin brothel. In 1965 it was the centre of an alleged spying scandal, that when investigated, was unfounded.

== Background ==
Established in 1947, the brothel Pension Clausewitz was located in the Charlottenburg district of Berlin on the third floor of 4 Clausewitzstraße, a side street off the Kurfürstendamm. In the early 1960s, the founder gave up the running of the brothel after a second conviction for procuring. Pension Clausewitz was at that time the most expensive brothel in West Berlin. Hans Helmcke took over the running of the brothel, assisting him were Fritz Wussow and "Consul Josy" Eugen Indig. All three were well known to the police. In November 1964, Helmcke was in court over the brothel and was fined 3,000 marks. Despite this, Helmcke continued to operate Pension Clausewitz as before.

== Spying suspicions ==
Helmcke and his brothel were under surveillance by the Sittenpolizei (vice squad). Shortly before Christmas 1964, a check at the Pension Clausewitz and Helmcke's apartment took place, in which the police found Helmcke's notebook. During the investigation, three of the telephone numbers in the notebook were discovered to be East Berlin. It turned out that they were among the numbers used by the Stasi (GDR state security police).

On 9 January 1965 Helmcke was arrested on suspicion of treason and investigations against him initiated. Rumours quickly surfaced that Pension Clausewitz had been a spy facility for the Stasi. The allegations were discussed in detail in the press. It was rumoured that politicians in Helmcke's brothel had been guests not only from West Berlin, but also members of the Bundestag and its ministers, high-ranking business representatives and other important celebrities, and that the prostitutes were extensively questioned on behalf of the Stasi. It was also alleged that there had been a monitoring system and incriminating photographs had been taken for later extortion by the East German intelligence service. A number of well-known politicians, including the Berlin Senator Heinrich Albertz and Federal Minister Erich Mende were specifically suspected of being involved.

The Pension Clausewitz became the center of extensive coverage, in which a large espionage and party scandal was suspected. However, it soon turned out that such a scandal did not exist. The Pension Clausewitz had neither been frequented by important politicians, nor had the Stasi deployed espionage activities there. There were no compromising photos of public figures, and the monitoring system turned out to be an answering machine. In fact, only the three phone numbers in Helmcke's notebook gave any link to the Stasi.

However, because Helmcke was unable to give any reasonable reason for the possession of Stasi phone numbers, he was convicted of treason. His sentence was limited to the three month pre-trial detention, and he was released. He gave up the Pension Clausewitz, but did not retire from the sex industry.

== In popular media ==
Based on the events at Pension Clausewitz, Ralph Habib directed the 1967 film Pension Clausewitz (eng. title Hotel Clausewitz) starring Wolfgang Kieling, Maria Brockerhoff and Friedrich Schoenfelder in the lead roles. The screenplay was by Franz Baake.

== Bibliography ==
- Rège, Philippe (2009). Encyclopedia of French Film Directors Volume 1 (in French). Scarecrow Press. ISBN 9780810869394.
