= Hermann Graf =

German officer and fighter pilot during World War II (1912–1988)

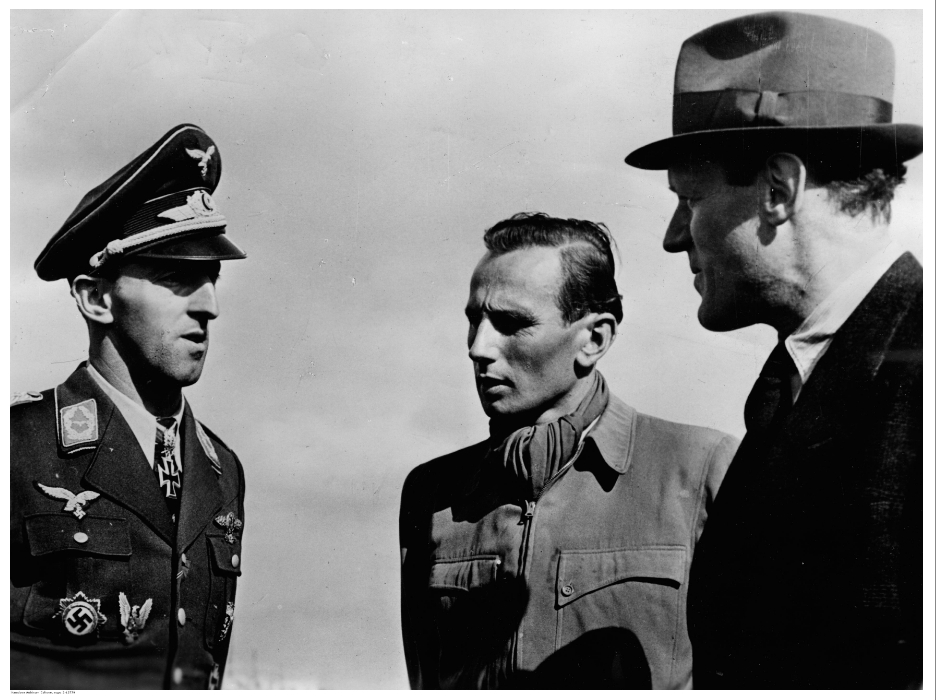
- Hermann Graf (left) with Willy Messerschmitt (right) and Fritz Wendel
- Born: 24 October 1912; Engen, German Empire
- Died: 4 November 1988 (aged 76); Engen, West Germany
- Burial place: City cemetery in Engen
- Spouse: Jola Jobst (1944–1949)
- Military career
- Allegiance: Nazi Germany
- Branch: Luftwaffe
- Service years: 1936–1945
- Rank: Oberst (Colonel)
- Units: JG 51, EJGr Merseburg, JG 52, JG 50 and JG 11
- Commands: JG 50, JG 11, JG 52
- Conflicts: World War II: Phoney War; Battle of Crete; Operation Barbarossa; Eastern Front; Defense of the Reich
- Awards: Knight's Cross of the Iron Cross with Oak Leaves, Swords and Diamonds
- Other work: Salesman

Hermann Graf (24 October 1912 – 4 November 1988) was a German Luftwaffe World War II fighter ace. (Note: A flying ace or fighter ace is a military aviator credited with shooting down five or more enemy aircraft during aerial combat.) He served on both the Eastern and Western Fronts. He became the first pilot in aviation history to claim 200 aerial victories—that is, 200 aerial combat encounters resulting in the destruction of the enemy aircraft. In about 830 combat missions, he claimed a total of 212 aerial victories, almost all of which were achieved on the Eastern Front.

Graf, a pre-war football player and glider pilot, joined the Luftwaffe and started flight training in 1936. He was initially selected for transport aviation but was subsequently posted to Jagdgeschwader 51 (JG 51—51st Fighter Wing) in May 1939. At the outbreak of war he was stationed on the Franco–German border flying uneventful patrols. He was then posted as a flight instructor stationed in Romania as part of a German military mission training Romanian pilots. Graf flew a few ground support missions in the closing days of the German invasion of Crete.

Following the start of Operation Barbarossa, the German invasion of the Soviet Union, Graf claimed his first aerial victory on 4 August 1941. He was awarded the Knight's Cross of the Iron Cross after 45 victories on 24 January 1942. It was during the second summer of the eastern campaign; however, that his success rate dramatically increased. By 16 September 1942 his number of victories had increased to 172 for which he was honored with the Knight's Cross of the Iron Cross with Oak Leaves, Swords and Diamonds. At the time of its presentation to Graf it was Germany's highest military decoration. (Note: In 1942, the Knight's Cross of the Iron Cross with Oak Leaves, Swords and Diamonds was second only to the Grand Cross of the Iron Cross, which was awarded only to senior commanders for winning a major battle or campaign, in the military order of the Third Reich. The Knight's Cross of the Iron Cross with Oak Leaves, Swords and Diamonds as the highest military order was surpassed on 29 December 1944 by the Knight's Cross of the Iron Cross with Golden Oak Leaves, Swords and Diamonds.) On 26 September 1942 he shot down his 200th enemy aircraft.

By then a national hero, Graf was withdrawn from combat operations and posted to a fighter pilot training school in France before being tasked with the setting up of a new special unit: Jagdgeschwader 50 (JG 50—Fighter Wing 50). Its mission was as a high-altitude unit to intercept the de Havilland Mosquito intruders. In November 1943 Graf returned to combat operations. He was appointed Geschwaderkommodore (Wing Commander) of Jagdgeschwader 11 (JG 11—11th Fighter Wing) and claimed his last and 212th aerial victory on 29 March 1944. He was severely injured during that encounter and, after a period of convalescence, became Geschwaderkommodore of Jagdgeschwader 52 (JG 52—52nd Fighter Wing). He and the remainder of JG 52 surrendered to units of the United States Army on 8 May 1945, but were turned over to the Red Army. Graf was held in Soviet captivity until 1949. After the war he worked as an electronic sales manager and died after a long illness in his home town of Engen on 4 November 1988.

== Early life ==
Hermann Anton Graf was born on 24 October 1912 in Engen in what was then the Grand Duchy of Baden near Lake Constance and the border to Switzerland, the son of Wilhelm Graf (1878–1937), a farmer, and his wife Maria, née Sailer (1877–1953). He was the third of three children, with two older brothers, Wilhelm Wilhelm (1904–1981) and Josef Wilhelm (1909–1981). His father fought in and survived World War I as an artillery soldier, being awarded the Iron Cross. Postwar, the Weimar Inflation crisis of 1923 wiped out virtually all the family savings, and as a result, from a very early age, Graf had to work.

As a young boy, Graf was an avid footballer. He started with his local football club DJK Engen and later became a goalkeeper at FC Höhen. In his teens, he was selected to join a group of talented young players trained by Sepp Herberger. Herberger was a forward in the Germany national football team from 1921–1925, and later head coach of the German 1954 FIFA World Cup-winning team. However, a broken thumb ended Graf's early hopes for a professional football career.

Graf finished his Volksschule (primary school) in 1926 at the age of thirteen. Without the means to fund a higher education, Graf applied for an apprenticeship. For the next three years, he worked as a locksmith's apprentice at a local factory. A locksmith had a low income, so when offered work as an apprentice clerk, he gladly accepted a change in career.

== Amateur pilot and joining the Luftwaffe ==
Graf saw his first aircraft when he was twelve years old. This sight created a conflict between his passion for football and a new obsession with flying. From 1930, he worked at the Engen town hall and saved all his money to buy a glider. Before his 20th birthday, he provided a homemade glider to the new Engen Sailplane Club. Every Sunday he would go out to the nearby Ballenberg mountain until a heavy crash destroyed his glider in the fall of 1932. In 1935, after Adolf Hitler officially revoked the Treaty of Versailles, Graf applied for flight training in the newly created Luftwaffe.

Graf was accepted for the Luftwaffe's A-level pilot training school in Karlsruhe on 2 June 1936. This training included theoretical and practical training in aerobatics, navigation, long-distance flights and deadstick landings. He graduated to the B1 school in Ulm-Dornstadt on 4 October 1937. The B courses included high-altitude flying, instrument flights, night landings and training to handle an aircraft in difficult situations. He subsequently completed his B2 training in Karlsruhe on 31 May 1938.

After graduating from the B2 school Graf was, at the age of 26, initially thought to be too old for fighter pilot training and was selected for the C school for transport pilots. On 31 May 1939, Graf passed officer-candidate training at Neubiberg. Because the fighter force was in dire need for new officers, Unteroffizier (a rank equivalent to sergeant) Graf was then transferred to 2. Staffel (2nd squadron) of I./Jagdgeschwader 51 (I./JG 51—1st group of the 51st fighter wing) at Bad Aibling . (Note: For an explanation of Luftwaffe unit designations, see Organisation of the Luftwaffe during World War II.) At this time I./JG 51 was equipped with one of the leading fighter aircraft of the time, the Messerschmitt Bf 109E-1. Graf, who had never flown a modern fighter aircraft before, ended his first flight in a Bf 109 with a crash. When I./JG 51 was briefly reequipped with the Czech-built Avia B-534 biplane in July 1939, it gave Graf an opportunity to prove his flying expertise as well as to restore his self-confidence.

== World War II ==
=== 1939–1940 ===
When Germany invaded Poland in September 1939, I./JG 51 was stationed by the French border at Speyer and Graf was promoted to Feldwebel (a higher grade of sergeant). The unit immediately exchanged the Avia B-534 biplanes for Bf 109s and was tasked to protect Germany's western border. During this period of the so-called "Phoney War", Graf flew 21 combat sorties without firing his guns and was still considered an unreliable pilot. On 20 January 1940, his Gruppenkommandeur (Group Commander) Hans-Heinrich Brustellin had Graf transferred to Ergänzungs-Jagdgruppe Merseburg, which was a training unit for new fighter pilots to receive tactical instruction from pilots with combat experience. This unit was commanded by Major Gotthard Handrick, the 1936 Olympic gold medalist in the modern pentathlon and former commander of Jagdgruppe 88 of the Condor Legion during the Spanish Civil War.

While at this training unit, Graf was promoted to Leutnant (equivalent to second lieutenant) on 1 May 1940. At Merseburg, Graf met and befriended two other pilot trainees, Alfred Grislawski and Heinrich Füllgrabe, with whom he would later spend much of his combat career. Their time spent in the unit meant they missed the air combat of the Battle of France and Battle of Britain. On 6 October 1940, Handrick was appointed Gruppenkommandeur of III./Jagdgeschwader 52 (III./JG 52). Handrick had some influence on the personnel rotation within his Gruppe and had Graf and Füllgrabe transferred to 9./JG 52 with him, where they rejoined Grislawski.

=== Service in Romania and invasion of Greece ===
The rise of General Antonescu in Romania in 1940 led to a reorganization of his country's armed forces. In this, he was supported by a military mission from Germany, the Luftwaffenmission Rumänien (Luftwaffe Mission Romania) under the command of Generalleutnant (equivalent to major general) Wilhelm Speidel. Handrick's III./JG 52 was transferred to Bucharest in mid-October and temporarily renamed I./Jagdgeschwader 28 (I./JG 28) until 4 January 1941. Its primary task was to train Romanian Air Force personnel. Here, the trio of Graf, Füllgrabe and Grislawski was joined by Ernst Süß, and later by Leopold Steinbatz and Edmund Roßmann.

The airmen of 9./JG 28 spent a couple of relaxing months in Bucharest, outside the close scrutiny of Berlin. Graf even managed to play football when a Luftwaffe team played against Cyclope Bucharesti at the Bucharest Sports Arena before 30,000 spectators. During its time in Romania, the unit was witness to a major earthquake in November and an abortive civil war in January.

In March 1941, III./ JG 52 flew several sorties as aerial cover for the German 12th Army as it crossed the Danube into Bulgaria in preparation for the German intervention in the Greco-Italian War and its Balkan Campaign. During that operation, Graf's unit was kept back to defend the strategically vital Ploiești oilfields from Allied bombing raids, which never eventuated. In May, Graf was able to organise a second soccer international against a Romanian army team. For this, he called upon Herberger, now manager of the national team. Herberger arranged for several of the German squad to play, including an international debut by Fritz Walter. With Graf in goal, it was Walter who scored a hattrick in the 3–2 win.

In the third week of May 1941 a detachment of III./JG 52, including Graf, was transferred to southern Greece to support Operation Merkur, the German invasion of Crete. The unit flew mostly ground attack and anti-shipping missions during the fortnight it was based there but Graf did not engage in any aerial combat.

=== War against the Soviet Union ===
By mid-June, III./JG 52 was back together in Bucharest and re-equipped with the new, more powerful Bf 109F-4 model. The Gruppe was not involved in most of the fighting in the opening phases of Operation Barbarossa as it was once again kept back to defend Ploiești and the Romanian ports from Soviet bombers. The pilots’ mood was not helped when Reichsmarschall Hermann Göring, the commander-in-chief of the Luftwaffe, criticised the unit on 4 July for its lack of success compared to virtually all the other Jagdgruppen. On 1 August, after German advances had removed the threat of Soviet air attacks on Romania, the unit was transferred to the front line and the major Luftwaffe airbase at Belaya Tserkov in Ukraine south of Kiev. Graf achieved his first victory in the early hours of 4 August when his squadron was escorting a Junkers Ju 87 dive-bombing strike, shooting down one of a pair of attacking Polikarpov I-16 fighters. (Note: Spick & Weal say his first victory was on 3 August.) Despite his success, he was reprimanded by his squadron leader, because he had broken formation and forgotten to arm his guns before firing. His second victory was achieved the next day, although Graf was lucky to get away unscathed – landing his aircraft riddled with bullet holes.

9. Staffel also known as the Karaya-Staffel

As the German ground forces advanced across Ukraine in August and September, the air units of JG 52 kept pace – constantly moving on to forward airbases. The Gruppe was involved in providing cover for the southern crossings over the Dnieper, the capture of Poltava, the First Battle of Kharkov and then crossing the Perekop isthmus into the Crimea. They often flew three or four missions a day when weather permitted. By the end of October Graf was mastering his flying technique, becoming adept at low-level flying, and had achieved 20 victories. The rains arrived in November, turning the airfields to mud and limiting air operations and the number of serviceable aircraft. Graf's unit was moved forward to Taganrog to support the battle for Rostov. Once the snow arrived, freezing the ground, operations picked up again. In heavy combat over and around the see-saw battle, (Note: During December against the Soviet airforces covering South and Southwest Fronts the Luftwaffe claimed 135 enemy aircraft downed for only one operational loss of their own (III./JG 52 claiming 90 of those). By contrast, the records for VVS-Southern Front show 44 aircraft lost against 38 victories from 1 to 22 Dec.) Graf had doubled his score to 42 by the end of 1941, making him one of the Gruppe’s leading pilots. On New Year's Day 1942, III./JG 52 was transferred to the relative comfort of the large Kharkov-Rogan airfield, with its closed hangars. The blizzard conditions (often getting down to −20 °C overnight) made flying virtually impossible. On 24 January, Graf was awarded the Knight's Cross of the Iron Cross (Ritterkreuz des Eisernen Kreuzes) for his victories to date. Soon after, he was sent on rotation back home on leave. Within a month, his regular wingman, Steinbatz, was also awarded the Knight's Cross for a similar score.

Returning to his unit in mid-March, he soon achieved his 50th victory. On 23 March, Graf was officially appointed Staffelkapitän (squadron leader) of 9./JG 52, succeeding Hauptmann Franz Hörnig. He had already unofficially led the Staffel until late February when he went on home leave following his Knight's Cross presentation. During his absence, Oberleutnant Kurt Schade led 9./JG 52. On 23 March, Schade was shot down behind enemy lines and taken prisoner. The rains returned in April, bringing the muds of the rasputitsa. Aerial activity virtually stopped as both sides took the opportunity to regroup.

At the end of the month, III./JG 52 transferred to the Crimea, where Erich von Manstein's 11th Army was laying siege to Sevastopol. The 11th Army also faced Soviet forces on the Kerch Peninsula. Red Army forces had conducted amphibious landings there on 26 December 1941 and had strong air cover. At this time, Graf was competing with Leutnant Gerhard Köppen of 7./JG 52 (with 72 victories) as the Gruppe’s top pilot. They were constantly flying extra missions to outdo each other. On 30 April 1942, Graf had his best day to date. In seven missions over fourteen hours, he shot down six enemy aircraft to take his tally to 69. Exhausted, he then missed a day but on 2 May he exceeded that feat with seven victories from six missions. It was at this time that his squadron got the famous moniker, the "Karaya Staffel", from a record that Süß would incessantly play at the airfield and hum along to in the air. On 5 May, Köppen (with his score at 85 victories) was shot down over the Sea of Azov and was last seen being shelled by nearby Soviet artillery.

The ground offensive for Kerch opened on 8 May but almost immediately, III./JG 52 (with Graf on 90 victories) was sent back to Kharkov, to counter a major Soviet offensive there. The air conflict was intense and in the first two days (13–14 May 1942), Graf shot down thirteen aircraft, which included his 100th victory. He became the seventh Luftwaffe pilot to achieve that milestone. It is an illustration of his dominance within his Gruppe, and the Luftwaffe tactical doctrine of ace versus wingman. In the first six months of 1942 Graf alone accounted for a quarter of all the aircraft shot down by III./ JG 52 It was the culmination of a remarkable seventeen days since his return to the front in which he had shot down 47 aircraft. He was awarded the Knight's Cross of the Iron Cross with Oak Leaves (Ritterkreuz des Eisernen Kreuzes mit Eichenlaub) on 17 May 1942 for achieving 104 victories. Only two days later, his score now at 106, he was notified that he was also to receive the Knight's Cross of the Iron Cross with Oak Leaves and Swords (Ritterkreuz des Eisernen Kreuzes mit Eichenlaub und Schwertern). On 24 May, Graf and Leutnant Adolf Dickfeld of 7./JG 52, flew to the Eastern Front headquarters at Rastenburg in Poland (the Wolf's Lair), for the official Oak Leaves and Swords presentation by Adolf Hitler the next day. Dickfeld was presented with the Oak Leaves, having been awarded it on 19 May for achieving 101 victories after he shot down eleven aircraft on 18 May.

Following that, Graf was sent back to Germany on four weeks leave, during which he made a number of public appearances. While he was on leave, his long-time wingman and friend, Steinbatz, was killed on 15 June when his plane crashed after being hit by anti-aircraft fire. Steinbatz had been awarded the Oakleaves to his Knight's Cross on 2 June, and was posthumously awarded the Swords to his Knight's Cross for his 99 victories – the first non-commissioned officer in the Wehrmacht to be so honored.

=== Towards Stalingrad ===
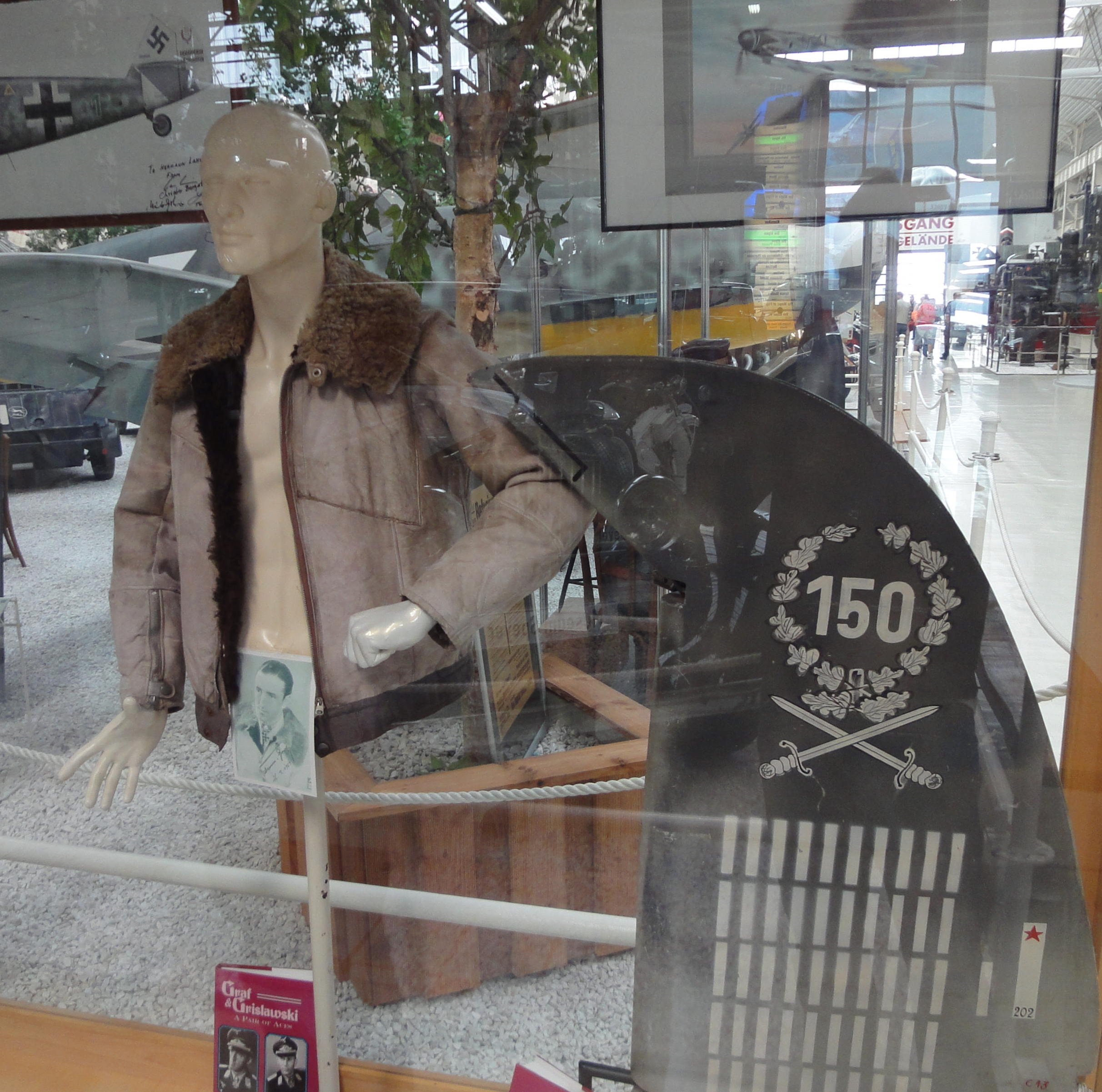
Hermann Graf's leather jacket and Bf 109 tail rudder on display at the Technikmuseum Speyer, Germany

By the time Graf returned to active duty at the end of July, III./JG 52 had re-equipped with the Bf 109G, and was back at Taganrog in the south. On the ground, the German Army's summer offensive, Fall Blau, was underway, and the city of Rostov, gateway to the Caucasus, had fallen. In mid-August, III./JG 52 moved forward to provide air cover as the army tried to establish bridgeheads across the Kuban River to capture the Black Sea ports. Geschwaderkommodore Gordon Gollob, of nearby JG 77, was temporarily appointed to command JG 52, after Major Herbert Ihlefeld, was severely wounded in a take-off accident. Gollob rivalled Graf for highest scoring pilot on the Eastern Front. On 14 August, both pilots had 120 victories. Soon after, Graf led Kommando Stalingrad, a detachment of experienced aces from III./JG 52, reassigned to JG 3 to cover the assault on Stalingrad. The detachment came under the command of Hauptmann Wolf-Dietrich Wilcke from JG 3. While still commanding 9. Staffel, Graf had been given command of Kommando Stalingrad on 27 August. He succeeded Oberleutnant Karl Decker who had temporarily led 9. Staffel from 28 May to 29 June while Graf was on home leave on account of the Oak Leaves and Sowrds presentation.

Initially Graf was based at Tuzov and then Pitomnik west of the city. He and his colleagues no longer faced obsolescent aircraft, as they had in the south. The city was critical to both sides. It was strongly defended and became the focus of intense air battles. Graf's victories quickly mounted, reaching 140 by the end of August. In September, he shot down 62 enemy aircraft. On 4 September 1942, he became the second pilot to reach their 150th victory – downing a Yakovlev Yak-1. This came just 6 days after Gollob achieved the same milestone. Many times, he was lucky to get back to base uninjured. His aircraft was routinely shot up by enemy pilots or anti-aircraft fire. The fastest-scoring ace of the Luftwaffe, he was now shooting down several planes each day. The three fighters he downed on 9 September took him to 172 victories, which made him the top-scorer in the Luftwaffe. For this, he was awarded the Knight's Cross of the Iron Cross with Oak Leaves, Swords and Diamonds (Ritterkreuz des Eisernen Kreuzes mit Eichenlaub, Schwertern und Brillanten). He became the fifth member of the Wehrmacht to receive this award, which at that time had only been awarded to Luftwaffe personnel. Within the space of eight months, he had received all four levels of the Knight's Cross – Germany's highest military decoration. (Note: Grand Cross of the Iron Cross was technically a higher award but this had only been awarded to Göring. The Knight's Cross with Golden Oak Leaves, Swords and Diamonds was a further grade institute on 29 December 1944 and only awarded once, to Hans-Ulrich Rudel on 1 January 1945.) He was also soon promoted to Hauptmann (Captain). (Note: According to Schumann, in June 1942. Bergström et al place it at the time of the award of his Diamonds in September.)

The next day tempered this achievement. Despite shooting down two more aircraft, it was the first time he had lost his wingman. Unteroffizier Johann Kalb had to bail out over the Volga River and was captured by Soviet troops. On 17 September he claimed three more victories but a 20mm Soviet cannon-shell went through his canopy, narrowly missing his head. On 23 September, he scored a remarkable ten victories in three missions, taking him to 197. On 26 September, he became the first pilot in aviation history to claim 200 enemy aircraft shot down. (Note: Spick & Weal say his 200th victory was on 2 October.) The 62 victories he claimed in that single month (of September) remain a record unbeaten in aviation history. Elevated to hero status by the Luftwaffe, he was promoted to Major on 29 September and forbidden from flying further combat missions. The whole of JG 52 gathered at Soldatskaja to congratulate him before he flew back to Berlin a few days later. Graf's leadership of 9. Staffel ended on 30 September, command then transferred to Hauptmann Ernst Ehrenberg.

=== Fighter pilot instructor—Jagdgruppe Ost ===
For the next few months, after home leave, Graf was sent on propaganda tours across Germany. He was also able to meet the Germany national football team and went to several of their international matches. On 28 January 1943 Graf took command of Ergänzungs-Jagdgruppe Ost (Fighter Training Group East) (Note: According to the 'Luftwaffe 1933–45' and 'Feldgrau.com' websites this unit had been redesignated Jagdgruppe Ost on 25 November 1942.) based in occupied France. Here newly trained fighter pilots destined for the Eastern Front received their final training from experienced Eastern Front pilots. The main base was at St. Jean d'Angély 70 miles (110 kilometers) north of Bordeaux on the Atlantic coast although Graf spent most of his time at the Toulouse-Blagnac Airport. Graf selected a Focke-Wulf Fw 190 A-5 aircraft for his personal use and lavishly decorated it. Without the stress of aerial combat, Graf was again able to indulge his other great passion: soccer.

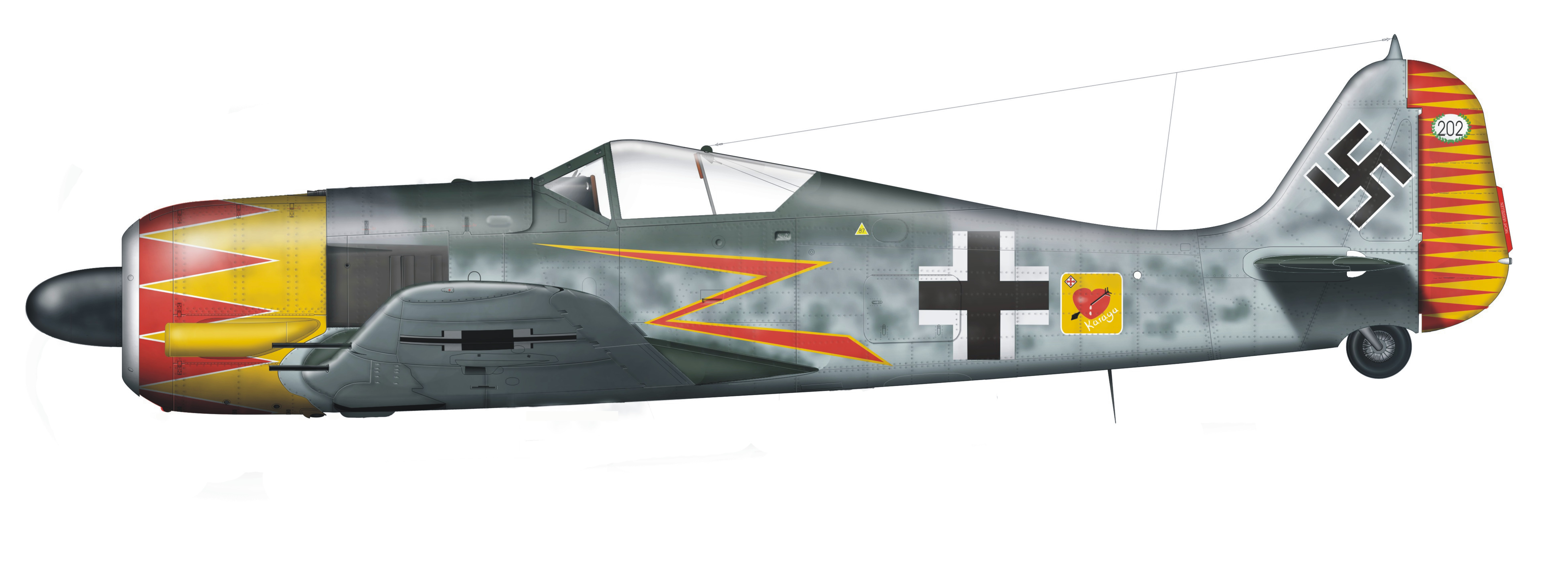
Focke-Wulf Fw 190 A-5/U7 flown by Major Hermann Graf, Southern France 1943.

In response to political humiliation caused by de Havilland Mosquito bombing raids into Germany, Hermann Göring ordered the formation of special high-altitude Luftwaffe units (Jagdgeschwader 25, commanded by Ihlefeld and Jagdgeschwader 50, under Graf) to combat these attacks. In mid-March, Graf was ordered to Berchtesgarden, Hitler's alpine retreat, where he received his instructions from Göring personally. Graf was permitted to choose his personnel. He transferred his old friends, Grislawski, Süss and Füllgrabe, from III./ JG 52, as well as a number of football players serving as administrators in his JGr Ost training unit.

While in Berlin organizing the necessary transfers, Graf was introduced to the young film actress, Jola Jobst, whom he later wed. The new assignment was then delayed for two months for political reasons. Graf was to run one final pilot-training program: the latest draft of Spanish volunteers heading to the Eastern Front – the 4th Escudrilla Azul (4th Blue Squadron). From 18 May to 6 June 1943, the pilots received three weeks of specialized fighter pilot training for the Soviet conditions.

=== Defense of the Reich ===
On 11 June 1943, Graf arrived at the Wiesbaden airfield to set up his new unit. Remaining elements were drafted out of Jagdgruppe Süd . The unit would be equipped with the new Messerschmitt Bf 109 G-5, a high-altitude variant of the Bf 109 G-6. It was equipped with a pressurized cockpit and armed with extra underwing cannons or rockets. Delivery of the aircraft was delayed but in the meantime, Graf was able to shoot down a Mosquito intruder. Graf's focus also went back to football. He invited Sepp Herberger, coach of Reich's football team, to Wiesbaden to train his team for a day. During this visit, Herberger encouraged Graf to use his influence to save Germany's best footballers from frontline duty. Subsequently, Graf brought in players from the Germany national football team as administrators, drivers and mechanics – men like Hermann Eppenhoff, Hermann Koch, Alfons Moog, Franz Hanreiter and Walter Bammes. Graf also requested Fritz Walter, who later captained the West German World Cup team of 1954. Walter's transfer was more difficult. For this, Graf had to submit his request directly to Generaloberst (Colonel General) Friedrich Fromm, the commander of the Ersatzheer (Reserve Army).

The United States Army Air Forces (USAAF) daylight bombing offensive over Europe commenced in January 1943. It was having an increasing impact. By July, they were able to reach deep into Germany and demanded more and more attention from the Luftwaffe. At the end of the month, against an 800-bomber raid on Kassel, Graf claimed his first four-engine bomber. (Note: Within the Luftwaffe, four-engined bombers operated by the Allied air-forces were referred to as a Viermot.)

His unit received the first twelve Bf 109 G-5 planes in July 1943. With one of these aircraft he managed to reach an altitude of 14,300 meters (46,900 feet). (Note: Bergström "et al" state that this flight was a world flight altitude record. It is unclear as to what category this "world record" pertains to. Mario Pezzi, flying a Caproni Ca.161, had reached an altitude of 17,083 meters (56,047 feet), 2,783 meters (9,131 feet) higher, almost five years earlier on 22 October 1938.) The unit was finally declared combat ready on 31 July 1943, albeit with only nineteen aircraft and made up of a single, three-squadron, Gruppe. Graf's football team, the Roten Jäger (Red Hunters), was also ready and played its first game on 4 August 1943, with Graf as goalkeeper. This football team followed Graf in his command postings for the remainder of the war. The unit's first major interception was fairly inauspicious – a bomber raid on the Ruhr on 12 August. Graf was greatly annoyed that no enemy aircraft were shot down. On 15 August 1943, Graf's unit was officially named Jagdgeschwader 50 (50th Fighter Wing). (Note: Being always just a single Gruppe in strength, the unit is often also known as JagdGruppe 50 (JGr 50).) On 17 August, the USAAF Eighth Air Force raided Regensburg, attacking the Messerschmitt factories there. This time JG 50 was far more successful. It was based almost right in the raid's flightpath and claimed 11 bombers shot down for the loss of two of their own pilots. (Note: Weal reports that about 30 fighters were engaged in this particular action. This included JG 50 and pilots from neighbouring training units. Sixteen bombers were claimed shot down by the combined force.) It was mooted that JG 50 would be equipped with the Messerschmitt Me 163 rocket fighter. The Me 163 was being tested by Major Wolfgang Späte's test unit Erprobungskommando 16 (16th Test Commando) at Peenemünde and Rechlin in the summer of 1943. Following a visit to the test unit, Graf also learned about the Messerschmitt Me 262 jet fighter. He returned to JG 50 full of optimism. The unit's regular role was extended to bomber interception, and Graf's Mosquito, the first victory for the unit, ironically proved to be the only one shot down by JG 50. After the heavy losses of the Regensburg raid, the USAAF was unable to immediately mount further unescorted deep raids into Germany. This allowed some respite for JG 50. Its next major action was 6 September. Graf shot down two of the four four-engined bombers claimed, even though he had to crash-land his aircraft.

=== Wing commander of JG 1 and JG 11 ===
The Allied bomber offensive was taking its toll of experienced leaders. On 8 October 1943, Oberstleutnant (Lieutenant Colonel) Hans Philipp, the second pilot after Graf to reach 200 air victories, and Geschwaderkommodore (Wing Commander) of Jagdgeschwader 1 (JG 1 – 1st Fighter Wing), was killed in action. The next day, while still officially remaining in command of JG 50, Graf was appointed acting Geschwaderkommodore of JG 1 and transferred to Jever. Graf appointed Grislawski (then Staffelkapitän [Squadron leader] of 1./ JG 50) as acting Kommodore in his absence. The Eighth Air Force flew their second raid on Schweinfurt on 14 October 1943. Although costly to the attackers (77 heavy bombers were destroyed by either German fighters or by the anti-aircraft fire for the loss of 46 German fighters), Göring was not satisfied. On 23 October, Graf and Major Anton Mader, Geschwaderkommodore of Jagdgeschwader 11 (JG 11 – 11th Fighter Wing, the other home-defense day-fighter unit) were summoned to a meeting of the fighter commanders with Göring at Deelen Air Base near Arnhem. The night before, 6,000 civilians had been killed in a bombing raid on Kassel. En route from Jever, Graf and Mader were nearly shot down by a flight of two Mosquitos over the North Sea Coast, while flying in an unarmed Messerschmitt Bf 108 Taifun.

Several days after the October meeting, JG 50 was disbanded and its personnel absorbed into I./Jagdgeschwader 301, a Wilde Sau night-fighter unit. While operational, JG 50 had claimed 45 Allied four-engined bombers. Graf was promoted to Oberst (Colonel) and on 11 November, appointed Geschwaderkommodore (Wing Commander) of JG 11, when Mader was transferred to JG 54 in the Leningrad sector. Aside from Grislawski, who was kept on as Staka (the squadron commander) of 1./ JG 1, he managed to take his soccer players and friends with him. Sunday 20 February marked the start of "Big Week" – six consecutive days of concentrated bombing by the USAAF designed to overwhelm the German defences. JG 11 was heavily involved and Graf shot down a B-24 Liberator for his 208th victory on 24 February. His 209th aerial victory, west of Berlin on 6 March, was over another B-24 Liberator, of the 453d Bombardment Group. It was actually an Herausschuss (separation shot) – a severely damaged heavy bomber forced to separate from its combat box and which the Luftwaffe counted as an aerial victory. On 29 March, Graf shot down two P-51 Mustangs that were making a fighter sweep ahead of their bomber stream. Chased and harried by the rest of their squadron, he tried to ram another before bailing out. Landing heavily, he broke both knees and fractured his arm. His Bf 109 G-6 (Werknummer 26020—factory number) crashed south of Schwarmstedt. These would prove to be his final air victories. In consequence, command of JG 11 was temporarily passed to Major Anton Hackl before Major Herbert Ihlefeld officially took command on 1 May. Prompt attention from the JG 11 medic saved Graf from losing his arm. From April to early July he spent time recovering in a hospital in his home-town of Engen. On 24 June, he married Jobst, whom he had been seeing over the past year.

=== Wing commander of JG 52 ===
During his convalescence, he was visited by the General der Jagdflieger (General of Fighters), Generalleutnant Adolf Galland, who offered Graf command of his old unit, JG 52. Graf accepted with the proviso that his Roten Jäger football team went with him. Once criticized for its low scoring rate early in the war, it was now the pre-eminent Geschwader, with over 10,000 victories. His return was celebrated with a welcome dinner at its headquarters in Kraków, southern Poland, on 20 September 1944. He was officially appointed on 1 October. Ongoing weakness in his left arm kept Graf on the ground. In the two years since he had left the Eastern Front, the quantity and quality of the Soviet pilots had greatly improved, as had their equipment. For the remainder of the war he oversaw his three separated fighter groups shuttled up and down the front, in emergency responses to each new Soviet offensive. Several times the crews had to evacuate as Soviet tanks and artillery were shelling their airfield. The German fuel crisis severely curtailed the amount of flight-time. Consequently, the November total for the wing of only 369 Soviet aircraft shot down was the lowest monthly total of the eastern campaign. As the winter weather got worse, the lull allowed Graf to organise a football match between his Roten Jäger and a local Kraków team, watched by 20,000 German soldiers.

In December, both Erich Hartmann and Gerhard Barkhorn, Graf's best pilots, returned to active duty. Within a month, they both achieved their 300th victories. On New Year's Day, the Luftwaffe's western command launched Operation Bodenplatte, against Allied air forces based in the Low Countries. It was an unsuccessful attempt to support the Battle of the Bulge offensive. For the failure, Göring fired Galland as General of the Fighters. In response, a meeting of senior Geschwader commanders, in early January (including Graf), agreed to approach Göring and demand major changes. (Note: This is from Bartz's book, and a statement Graf made to the newspaper 7 Tage on 3 November 1950. Yet a contradiction exists because according to Johannes Steinhoff in his 1974 book, he was the 5th leader present with Göring and not Graf, along with Günther Lützow, Eduard Neumann, Gustav Rödel and Hannes Trautloft.) When confronted, Göring was furious and immediately demoted all the fighter leaders aside from Graf, who stayed as Kommodore of JG 52 because of the unit's exemplary war record. Göring told Graf he needed him against the imminent Soviet attack.

The major Soviet Vistula-Oder offensive began in January which saw a number of the fighter units transferred from Reich Defence to defend the Eastern Front. JG 52 was based in and around Breslau defending the vital Silesian industrial region with intercept and ground attack missions. An enormous effort managed to briefly stall the Soviet advance. The Luftwaffe flew 2500 sorties on 1 & 2 February alone. On 25 January, Hans-Ulrich Rudel destroyed his 500th tank while his unit was based with JG 52. In the middle of this, Erich Hartmann was ordered to report for jet-training with Galland's new JV 44. Strong protests by both Graf and Hartmann had this order rescinded.

In mid-April, the siege of Berlin began and on 17 April, Hartmann claimed his 350th victory. On 21 April, Graf's unit began its deployment towards Deutsch Brod roughly 80 km away from the city of Brno. General Hans Seidemann, commander of Luftwaffenkommando VIII, wanted to make a last stand in the Alps. Graf disobeyed Seidemann's order for him and Erich Hartmann to fly to the British sector to avoid capture by the Soviets. He also refused to abandon his ground-crew and fly with his pilots to join Seidemann in the alpine redoubt. Instead, he led the 2,000 unit-personnel and fleeing local citizens on a march through Bohemia to cross the Moldau River (the nominal Allied stop-line). Once there, he surrendered his unit to the 90th US Infantry Division near Písek on 8 May 1945 and became a prisoner of war (POW).

== Prisoner of war ==
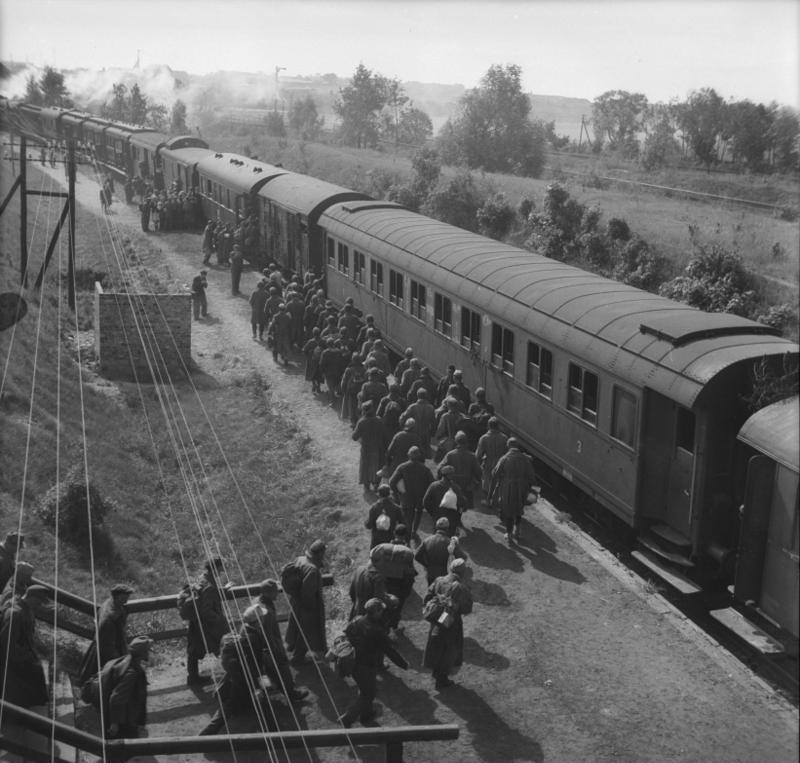
German POWs released at Frankfurt (Oder).

Graf's unit was interned for over a week with more than 30,000 other disarmed soldiers in a primitive camp with minimal food and sanitation. Following the letter of the Allied agreement, units fighting on the Eastern Front were to become Soviet prisoners. Graf and most of the JG 52 personnel were handed over by the American forces to the Soviet Union on 15 May 1945. On 20 August, he and other senior Luftwaffe officers, including Hartmann and Hans Hahn, were moved to POW Camp No. 150 in Gryazovets, northeast of Moscow. This was a (relatively) more comfortable confinement than the regular labour camps and intended to provide a more sympathetic environment for high-profile prisoners. When Graf was found not to be malleable for their purposes, the Soviet regime put him on trial for war-crimes. However, when insufficient evidence could be produced, the charges were dropped. Erich Hartmann however, was found guilty and sentenced to 25 years of forced labour. On 8 December 1945, Graf was moved to POW Camp No. 27 in Krasnogorsk, Moscow. The author, Musciano, mentions that he was subject to solitary confinement for extended periods, but that he had his final order hidden in his shoe and would re-read it to keep his sanity.

Whereas German POWs in Allied camps were progressively released in 1946–1947, the Soviets mainly released their prisoners in 1948–1949. Graf's release was finally approved late in 1949 and he was transferred to Repatriation Camp No. 69 (Heimkehrerlager Gronenfelde) near Frankfurt (Oder) in East Germany on 25 December 1949. By 3 January 1950, he was back in his home town of Engen, in the French Occupation Zone.

This relatively early release was perceived by many to have been due to collaboration with his Soviet captors, something for which his fellow pilots criticized him, especially following a 1950s book by fighter ace and fellow Soviet POW, Hans Hahn, entitled "I Speak the Truth" (Ich spreche die Wahrheit). This led to Graf's exclusion from post-war Luftwaffe veterans' associations. In 1971 Graf made his own statement to the newspaper, "Bild am Sonntag", saying that he, along with others including Hartmann, had briefly joined the BDO (an anti-Nazi group of German ex-officer prisoners) as a way to survive the psychological deprivation of the imprisonment. Bergström et al. say this is borne out by the Russian RGVA archive of Graf's POW file which makes no mention of extended co-operation with pro-Soviet groups(the BDO was disbanded after only a few months). (Hahn's account was corroborated by Siegfried Knappe who described Graf as someone who did everything the Russians asked of him out of fear.)

== Later life ==
Like many veterans, Graf initially had a hard time finding work, but his connections in the football community helped him. Herberger introduced Graf to Roland Endler, a welding manufacturer ("Elektro-Schweiss-Industrie GmbH") from Neuss. Endler also became president of the FC Bayern Munich football club between 1958 and 1962. Endler employed Graf as a salesman in his company, and Graf eventually advanced to branch leader in Baden-Württemberg and Sales Manager. The link to Bayern Munich allowed him to enjoy his long love of football, although his injuries never let him play competitively again. He did however, return to flying, joining the Zürich branch of the Swiss Aero Club in 1951. Shunned by many veterans, he did remain friends with of a number of his former comrades from the JG 52, in particular Alfred Grislawski.

His marriage with Jobst soon collapsed and they divorced. (Note: Jobst married Wolfgang Kieling in 1950 but committed suicide in October 1952.) He married twice thereafter and his third wife, Helga Schröck (whom he married in May 1959), gave birth to a son, Hermann-Ulrich, in 1959, and a daughter, Birgit, in 1961. In 1965, Graf was diagnosed with Parkinson's disease, a condition that seemed to affect many former high-altitude flyers and which caused his health to slowly deteriorate. Graf died in his hometown of Engen on 4 November 1988.

== Summary of career ==
=== Aerial victory claims ===
According to US historian David T. Zabecki, Graf was credited with 212 aerial victories. He claimed these aerial victories in approximately 830 combat missions with a mission-to-claim ratio of 3.92, 10 on the Western Front which included six four-engined-bombers and one Mosquito, and 202 on the Eastern Front. Mathews and Foreman, authors of Luftwaffe Aces — Biographies and Victory Claims, researched the German Federal Archives and found records for 206 aerial victory claims, plus six further unconfirmed claims. This figure includes 202 aerial victories on the Eastern Front and four four-engined bombers on the Western Front.

=== Awards ===
- Wound Badge in Silver
- Ehrenpokal der Luftwaffe (9 December 1941) (Note: According to Obermaier and Patzwall, on 15 December 1941.)
- Combined Pilots-Observation Badge in Gold with Diamonds
- Romanian Pilots Badge
- Crimea Shield
- Romanian Knight of Order of the Crown (23 May 1941)
- Iron Cross (1939)
  - 2nd Class (9 August 1941) (Note: According to Thomas, on 22 August 1941.)
  - 1st Class (31 August 1941) (Note: According to Thomas, on 10 October 1941.)
- Front Flying Clasp of the Luftwaffe for Fighter Pilots
  - in Bronze (15 May 1941)
  - in Silver (25 August 1941) for 65 missions
  - in Gold (10 November 1941) for 112 missions
- German Cross in Gold in April 1942 (Note: According to Thomas, on 9 September 1942.)
- Knight's Cross of the Iron Cross with Oak Leaves, Swords and Diamonds
  - Knight's Cross on 24 January 1942 as Leutnant of the Reserves with 9./Jagdgeschwader 52 for 42 victories
  - 93rd Oak Leaves on 17 May 1942 as Leutnant of the Reserves and Staffelkapitän of 9./Jagdgeschwader 52 for 104 victories.
  - 11th Swords on 19 May 1942 as Leutnant of the Reserves and Staffelkapitän of 9./Jagdgeschwader 52 (Note: According to Scherzer, on 18 May 1942.) with 106 victories.
  - 5th Diamonds on 15 September 1942 as Oberleutnant of the Reserves and Staffelkapitän of 9./Jagdgeschwader 52 (Note: Photograph in Bergstrom et al, on p.129, of the telegram of the award shows it dated 15 Sept. Other sources cite 26 September) for 172 victories.

=== Dates of rank ===
1 September 1939:	Feldwebel (Sergeant) of the Reserves
1 May 1940:	Leutnant (Second Lieutenant) of the Reserves
1 June 1942:	Oberleutnant (First Lieutenant) of the Reserves (Note: According to Schumann, on 19 May 1942.)
18 September 1942:	Hauptmann (Captain) of the Reserves
29 September 1942:	Major
1 February 1944:	Oberstleutnant (Lieutenant Colonel) (Note: According to Schumann, this was on 1 May 1944.)
8 May 1945:	Oberst (Colonel)

=== Commands ===
Military offices
Preceded by Oberleutnant Kurt Schade	Squadron Leader of 9./JG 52; 23 March 1942 – 2 October 1942	Succeeded by Haptmann Ernst Ehrenberg
Preceded by Major Werner Andres	Commander of Jagdgruppe Ost; 1 February 1943 – April 1943	Succeeded by Major Werner Andres
Preceded by new unit	Commander of Jagdgeschwader 50; 1 June 1943 – 15 October 1943	Succeeded by disbanded, in parts transferred to I./JG 301
Preceded by Oberstleutnant Hans Philipp	Commander of Jagdgeschwader 1 October 1943 – 10 November 1943	Succeeded by Oberst Walter Oesau
Preceded by Major Anton Mader	Commander of Jagdgeschwader 11; 11 November 1943 – 29 March 1944	Succeeded by Major Anton Hackl (interim)
Preceded by Oberstleutnant Dietrich Hrabak	Commander of Jagdgeschwader 52; 1 October 1944 – 8 May 1945	Succeeded by none
