= Carnal Circuit =

1969 film

- Directed by: Alberto De Martino
- Screenplay by: Lianella Carell; Carlo Romano; Alberto De Martino; Vincenzo Flamini
- Produced by: Hans Pflüger
- Starring: Dorothy Malone; John Ireland; Luciana Paluzzi; Romina Power; Frank Wolff; Robert Hoffmann
- Cinematography: Sergio D'Offizi
- Edited by: Otello Colangeli
- Music by: Bruno Nicolai
- Production companies: Empire Films S.r.l.; Corona Filmproduktion GmbH
- Distributed by: Fida; Nora Filmverleih GmbH & Co. KG
- Release dates: August 14, 1969 (Italy); August 13, 1970 (West Germany)
- Running time: 93 minutes
- Countries: Italy; West Germany
- Languages: Italian; English

Carnal Circuit (Italian: Femmine insaziabili, German: Mord im schwarzen Cadillac, also known as The Insatiables and Beverly Hills) is a 1969 Italian-German giallo written and directed by Alberto De Martino.

== Plot ==
A man hides his best friend from the criminals out to get him and suffers a violent beating. His friend gets killed, and he tries to find out why.

== Cast ==
- Dorothy Malone as Vanessa Brighton
- Robert Hoffmann as Paolo Vittori
- Luciana Paluzzi as Mary Sullivan
- Frank Wolff as Frank Donovan
- John Ireland as Walter Salinger
- Roger Fritz as Giulio Lamberti
- Romina Power as Gloria Brighton
- Nicoletta Machiavelli as Luisa Lamberti
- Ini Assmann as Salinger's Secretary
- Rosemarie Lindt as Patty
- Elena Persiani as Claire
- Rainer Basedow as Donovan's Henchman
- John Karlsen as Fletcher
- Rod Dana as Charlie

== Production ==
Carnal Circuit was shot in Rome between February 12, 1968, and February 1969.

During an underwater scene the camera operator unexpectedly and without Romina Power's knowing, pulled down the bottom part of her swimsuit. For a moment you can see her bare buttocks. Afterwards, Romina's mother went to the producer Goffredo Lombardo shouting and complaining about director Alberto De Martino.

== Release ==
In West Germany, Carnal Circuit was released on August 13, 1970.
