= Jagdgeschwader 50 =

Specialist Luftwaffe unit

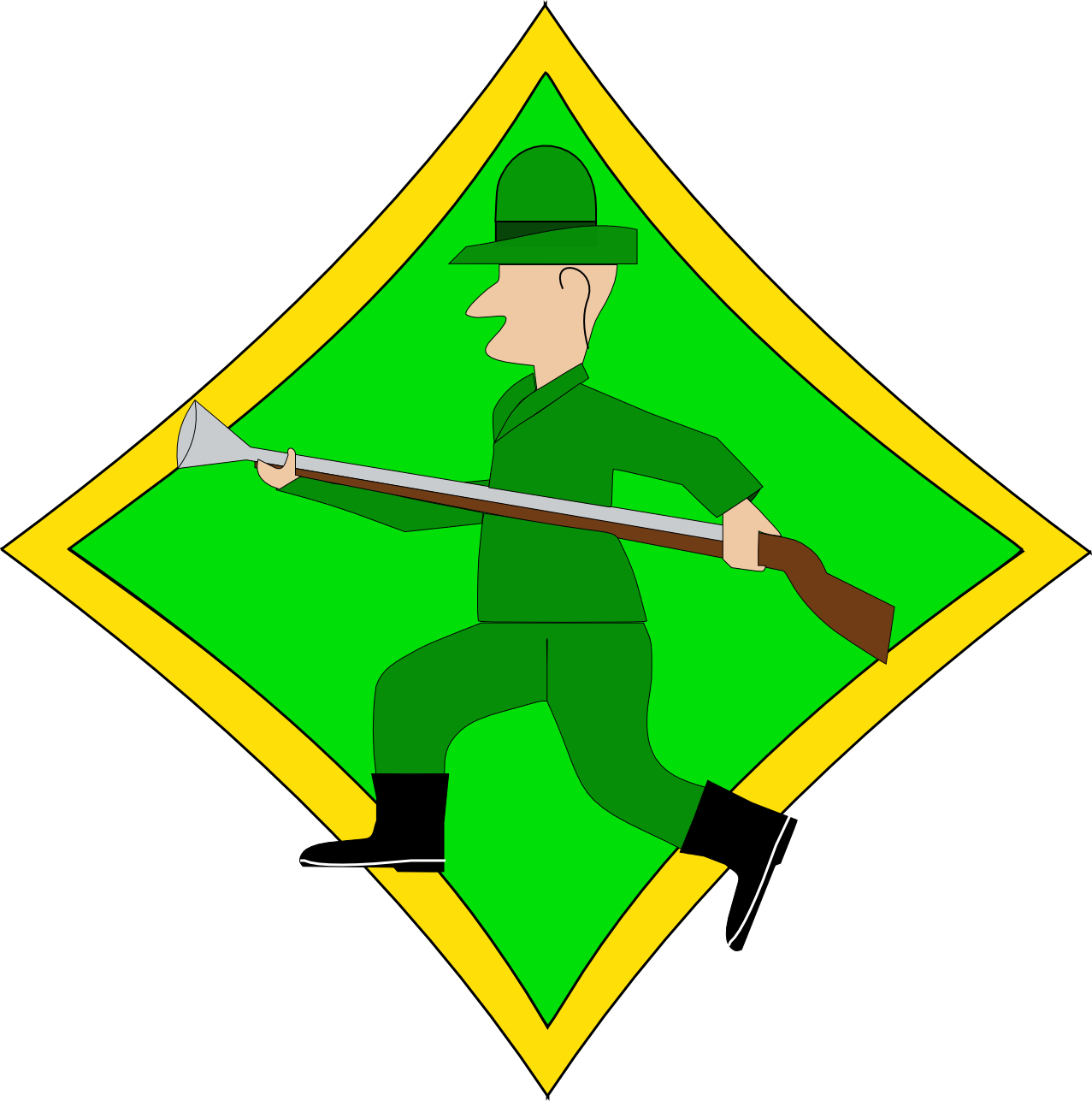
- Emblem of JG 50
- Active: July–October 1943
- Country: Nazi Germany
- Branch: Luftwaffe
- Type: Fighter Aircraft
- Role: Air superiority
- Size: Air Force Wing

Commanders
- Notable commanders: Hermann Graf

Aircraft flown
- Fighter: Bf 109

Jagdgeschwader 50 (JG 50), sometimes erroneously referred to as Jagdgruppe 50, was formed at Wiesbaden-Erbenheim Airfield in early June 1943 as Jagdgruppe Süd. It only controlled two augmented Staffeln (squadrons). It was a specialized unit with the primary objective to combat the United States Army Air Forces' heavy bomber formations as well as intercepting the Royal Air Force's de Havilland Mosquito light bombers during World War II. The Geschwader was equipped with the Messerschmitt Bf 109, some of them equipped with the under-wing WGr 21 rocket-propelled mortar, as well as a special high-altitude variant.

== History ==
On 21 July 1943, Jagdgruppe Süd der ObdL was formed as a high-altitude fighter unit to combat the RAF's Mosquito twin-engine bomber and reconnaissance aircraft. On 15 August 1943 the unit was redesignated Jagdgeschwader 50 and was commanded by Major Hermann Graf, the first pilot in history to achieve 200 aerial victories. It was planned to equip JG 50 with the Messerschmitt Me 163 rocket fighter and began training on glider aircraft. Both JG 50 (and its sister unit Jagdgeschwader 25) were ultimately unsuccessful in effectively countering the Mosquito and were more successfully used for interception of the US heavy bomber formations during the daylight offensive over Europe in 1943-44. Only one Mosquito was taken down, and even that is subject to dispute.

JG 50 were initially equipped with eight Messerschmitt Bf 109G-5s and Bf 109G-6s. These aircraft were polished to increase speed, and equipped with a special internal tank for liquefied nitrous oxide as part of the GM-1 engine power boosting system, which was injected directly into the supercharger intake. This allowed the pilot to boost the rated horsepower of the DB 605 engine. The unit was later also equipped with specially supercharged Fw 190A-5.

Graf was allowed to pick any pilots he wished for the new unit, and he chose a further three aces Alfred Grislawski, Ernst Süß, and Heinrich Füllgrabe from his old unit - the 9. Staffel of JG 52. Graf was charged with assessing new methods of attacking American bomber formations. JG 50 was the first formation to use the Werfer-Granate 21 rocket mortar, with one carried under each wing. While these rockets could bring down a bomber with one hit, they were designed to disperse the combat boxes of Allied aircraft rather than as a direct fire weapon.

On 31 July 1943 the unit was declared operational, with a total of 19 aircraft. On 17 August 1943 the unit was one of those who intercepted American bomber forces attacking the Messerschmitt factory in Regensburg and the ball bearing plants in Schweinfurt. Grislawski claimed two Boeing B-17 Flying Fortresses downed on this raid. On 6 September the unit's pilots shot down four Flying Fortresses over Stuttgart, one to Grislawski, and two claimed by Graf with the WfGr.21, who was then shot down but survived a forced landing. Grislawski claimed one other kill with the unit, a B-17 on 14 October.

By October, JG 50 had been disbanded and merged with I Gruppe, JG 301. Graf was appointed commander of JG 11 in November 1943. On 6 November 1943 Grislawski was appointed Staffelkapitän of 1./JG 1 based at Deelen, the Netherlands. Two of the Karaya Quartet survived the war; Süß and Füllgrabe were killed in action.
