= Jola Jobst =

German actress (1915–1952)

- Born: 25 November 1915
- Died: October 1952 (aged 36)
- Occupation: actress
- Spouse(s): Hermann Graf (1944–1949); Wolfgang Kieling (1950–1952)

Jola Jobst (25 November 1915 – October 1952) was a German movie actress. Jobst was married to the World War II fighter pilot, Hermann Graf, from 1944 to 1949. Following her divorce she married the actor Wolfgang Kieling in 1950. She committed suicide in 1952.

== Selected filmography ==
=== Film ===
- Little Dorrit (1934)
- The Fight with the Dragon (1935)
- The King's Prisoner (1935)
- The Unsuspecting Angel (1936)
- Die große und die kleine Welt (1936)
- The Model Husband (1937)
- Die Fledermaus (1937)
- Unsere kleine Frau (1938)
