= Hunting Party (1959 film) =

1959 film directed by Hermann Kugelstadt

- Directed by: Hermann Kugelstadt
- Written by: Heinz Bothe-Pelzer
- Produced by: Hubert Schonger
- Starring: Wolf Albach-Retty; Willy Fritsch; Lucie Englisch
- Cinematography: Otto Reinwald; Karl Schröder; Wolfgang von Schiber
- Edited by: Horst Rossberger
- Music by: Raimund Rosenberger
- Production company: Eine Hubert Schonger-Production
- Distributed by: Ceres-Filmverleih
- Release date: 22 December 1959
- Running time: 91 minutes
- Country: West Germany
- Language: German

Hunting Party or Hubertus Hunt (German: Hubertusjagd) is a 1959 West German drama film directed by Hermann Kugelstadt and starring Wolf Albach-Retty, Willy Fritsch and Lucie Englisch. It is part of the tradition of heimatfilm which were at their commercial peak during the decade. Its German title is a reference to the traditional Hubertus Day hunts commemorating the life of St. Hubert of Liege.

== Cast ==
- Wolf Albach-Retty as Friedrich Dahlhoff
- Elke Andrend as Irene
- Lucie Englisch as Gretl
- Helmut Fischer as Erwin
- Willy Fritsch as Otto Lindenberg
- Sascha Hehn as Peterle
- Sylvia Lydi as Charlotte
- Angelika Meissner as Monika Dahlhoff
- Raidar Müller-Elmau as Jörg
- Robert Naegele as Thomas Faber
- Margitta Scherr as Christa Faber
- Viktor Staal as Jakob Reinhard
- Peter Thom as Mathias Reinhard

== Bibliography ==
- Bock, Hans-Michael & Bergfelder, Tim. The Concise CineGraph. Encyclopedia of German Cinema. Berghahn Books, 2009.
