= Madame and Her Niece =

- Directed by: Eberhard Schröder
- Written by: Guy de Maupassant (story); Werner P. Zibaso (screenplay)
- Produced by: Wolf C. Hartwig; Ludwig Spitaler; Fred Zenker
- Starring: Ruth Maria Kubitschek; Edwige Fenech; Fred Williams
- Cinematography: Klaus Werner
- Edited by: Herbert Taschner
- Music by: Gert Wilden
- Production company: Rapid Film
- Distributed by: Nora-Filmverleih
- Release date: 9 May 1969
- Running time: 87 minutes
- Country: West Germany
- Language: German

Madame and Her Niece (German: Madame und ihre Nichte) is a 1969 West German erotic drama film directed by Eberhard Schröder and featuring Ruth Maria Kubitschek, Edwige Fenech, and Fred Williams. It is an adaptation of the 1884 Guy de Maupassant's short story Yvette, a tale of lost innocence and rigid 19th-century social class boundaries, updated to the 1960s.

== Production ==
There have been two previous adaptations of de Maupassant's story, a French in 1928 and a German in 1938. Director Eberhard Schröder was already a veteran of erotic comedies and sexploitation films, such as the Schulmädchen-Report (Schoolgirls Report) series and the Hausfrauen-Report (Report on the Housekeepers) series; he was mainly known for having directed Wir haben abgetrieben, Herr Staatsanwalt (I committed abortion, Mr District Attorney), an exploitative documentary about abortion. (He committed suicide in 1974.)

The film's sets were designed by the art director Hertha Hareiter.

== Synopsis ==
Michelle De Winter is after the good life, dining and mingling with the richest men, along with her equally ambitious daughter, fashion model Yvette, whom Michelle, out of vanity, introduces as her niece. De Winter lives with a group of promiscuous creative types, yet looking out for a millionaire playboy. Yvette falls in love with the handsome Peter Von Hallstein and asks the fatherly Dr. Fink to help her in a scheme to seduce Peter into proposing marriage.

== Cast ==
- Ruth Maria Kubitschek as Michelle De Winter
- Edwige Fenech as Yvette De Winter
- Fred Williams as Peter von Hallstein
- Karl Walter Diess as Dr. Fink
- Rainer Penkert as Jochen Reiter
- Ini Assmann as Amelie
- Valerie Antelmann as Sophie
- E.O. Fuhrmann as Juwelier
- Robert Naegele as Karl
- Ann Hellstone as Karin
- Hansi Lohmann as the masseuse
- Rudolph Moshammer as a fashion designer
- Rosl Mayr as the cloakroom attendant
