= Death Knocks Twice =

1969 film

- Film poster
- Directed by: Harald Philipp
- Written by: Max Pierre Schaeffer (novel); Mario di Nardo; Sergio Garrone; Harald Philipp
- Produced by: Herbert Maris
- Starring: Dean Reed
- Cinematography: Claudio Racca
- Edited by: Alfred Srp
- Music by: Piero Umiliani
- Release date: 25 November 1969
- Running time: 86 minutes
- Countries: West Germany; Italy
- Language: German

Death Knocks Twice (Italian: La morte bussa due volte), German: Blonde Köder für den Mörder), is a 1969 Italian-West German detective film directed by Harald Philipp and starring Dean Reed, Fabio Testi and Adolfo Celi. It also starred Anita Ekberg, Helene Chanel and Femi Benussi. It was also released as Blonde Bait for the Murderer and The Blonde Connection.

== Plot ==
A wealthy businessman, Francesco Villaverde, who suffers from mental issues, strangles Mrs. Ferretti (Anita Ekberg), the beautiful wife of another businessman, on a beach after they make love. The murder is witnessed by two criminals who then blackmail Francesco's wife to get some property they desire from her. Two private eyes try to prove that Francesco murdered the woman on the beach, so they use a young blonde (the daughter of one of the detectives) to pose as bait for Francesco to kill.

== Cast ==
- Dean Reed as Bob Martin
- Fabio Testi as Francisco di Villaverde
- Ini Assmann as Ellen Kent
- Leon Askin as Pepe Mangano
- Werner Peters as Charly Hollmann
- Nadja Tiller as Maria di Villaverde
- Anita Ekberg as Sophia Perretti
- Adolfo Celi as Perretti / Max Spiegler
- Riccardo Garrone as Amato Locatelli
- Mario Brega as Riccardo
- Hélène Chanel as Angela
- Femi Benussi as Mabel Simmons
- Renato Baldini as Mr. Simmons
- Tom Felleghy as Berry
