= Ini Assmann =

German actress

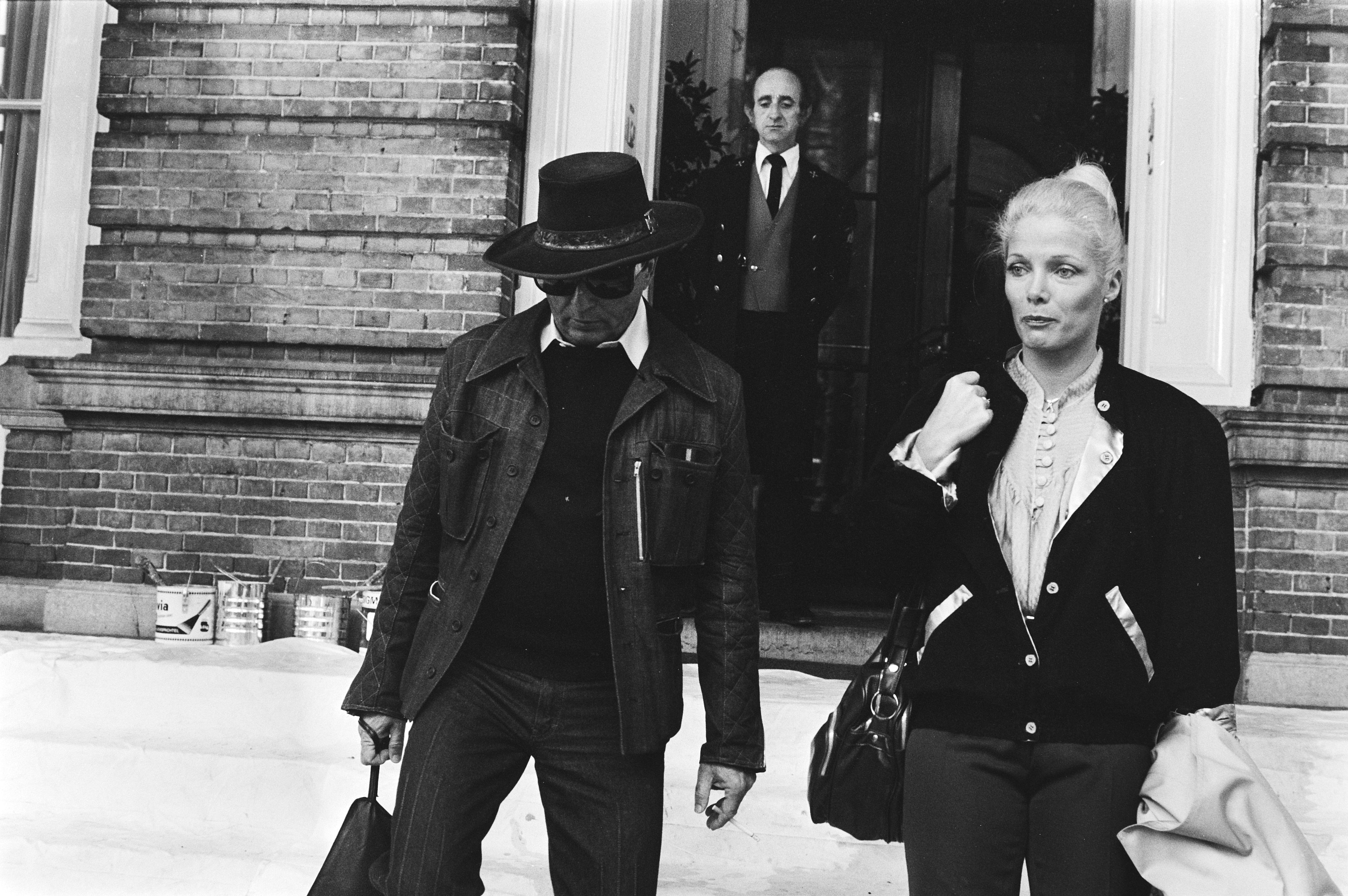
- Harold Robbins and Ini Assmann (1979)
- Born: July 13, 1945; Kassel, Germany
- Died: December 6, 2015 (aged 70); California, U.S.
- Other name: Ini Hassmann
- Occupation: Actress
- Years active: 1967-1975 (film & TV)

Ini Assmann was a German film actress of the 1960s and 1970s.

== Selected filmography ==
- The Magnificent Tony Carrera (1968)
- Hugo, the Woman Chaser (1969)
- Death Knocks Twice (1969)
- Carnal Circuit (1969)
- Madame and Her Niece (1969)

== Bibliography ==
- Cowie, Peter. Variety International Film Guide 1970. Tantivy Press, 1969.
