= Alfred Grislawski =

German World War II fighter pilot

- Grislawski as a Hauptmann
- Born: 2 November 1919; Wanne-Eickel, Germany
- Died: 19 September 2003 (aged 83); Herne, Germany
- Military career
- Allegiance: Nazi Germany
- Branch: Luftwaffe
- Service years: 1937–1945
- Rank: Hauptmann (captain)
- Units: JG 52, JG 50, JG 53, JG 1
- Commands: 1./JG 1, 11./JG 53, III./JG 1
- Conflicts: See battles World War II: Balkan Campaign; Eastern Front; Operation Barbarossa; Second Battle of Kharkov; Western Front; Defense of the Reich
- Awards: Knight's Cross of the Iron Cross with Oak Leaves
- Other work: truck driver, janitor

Alfred Grislawski (2 November 1919 – 19 September 2003) was a German Luftwaffe military aviator during World War II, a fighter ace credited with 133 victories claimed in over 800 combat missions. (Note: Grislawski was officially credited with 133 aerial victories. Supposedly his 133rd victory was over a P-38 Lightning shot down on 26 September 1944 at 16:54 south of Dülmen. Grislawski himself denied that he shot down any enemy aircraft on that date, or even having made such a claim.) The majority of his victories were claimed over the Eastern Front, with 24 claims over the Western Front. Of his 24 victories over the Western Allies, 18 were four-engined bombers.

Born in Wanne-Eickel, Grislawski grew up in the Weimar Republic and Nazi Germany. Following his compulsory Reich Labour Service (Reichsarbeitsdienst), he joined the military service of the Luftwaffe in 1937. He completed flight and fighter pilot training in 1940 and was posted to Jagdgeschwader 52 (JG 52—52nd Fighter Wing). Flying with this wing, Grislawski on 1 September 1941 during Operation Barbarossa, the German invasion of the Soviet Union. In July 1942, he was awarded the Knight's Cross of the Iron Cross and claimed his 100th aerial victory in April 1943. In June 1943, Grislawski was wounded by a blast from a land mine.

Following his convalescence, he was posted to the Western Front where he was made Staffelkapitän (squadron leader) of the newly formed 1. Staffel (1st squadron) of Jagdgruppe Süd (JGr Süd—Fighter Group South) in August 1943. In November 1943, he was transferred and appointed Staffelkapitän of 1. Staffel of Jagdgeschwader 1 "Udet" (JG 1—1st Fighter Wing). Here, he was awarded the Knight's Cross of the Iron Cross with Oak Leaves in April 1944. Then transferred to 11. Staffel of Jagdgeschwader 53 (JG 53—53rd Fighter Wing), Grislawski flew his last combat mission on 26 September 1944 when he was shot down and wounded, spending the rest of the war in hospitals and convalescence. After the war, Grislawski worked as a truck driver and later as a janitor. He died on 19 September 2003 in Herne.

== Early life and career ==
Grislawski was born on 2 November 1919 at Wanne-Eickel in the Ruhrgebiet, the son of Gustav Grislawski, a coal miner and member of the Communist Party of Germany (KPD), and his wife Henriette. He was the second of four children, with an older brother, Walter, a younger sister, Herta, and the youngest brother Horst. His first years of his life were characterized by hardship and starvation caused by the hyperinflation in the Weimar Republic in aftermaths of World War I. On leaving school in July 1934, Grislawski left his family home and worked on a farm in Pomerania. He applied to join the Kriegsmarine (navy) but was rejected and offered to join the infantry of the Army which he declined. Grislawski was then given the option of a career in naval aviation which he accepted.

From April to late October, Grislawki completed his compulsory Reich Labour Service (Reichsarbeitsdienst). On 1 November 1937, he joined the military service of the Luftwaffe with 2. Kompanie (2nd company) of Fliegerersatzabteilung 16 (16th Flier Replacement Unit) at Schleswig. In August 1939, he began his flight training at the flight training school in Delmenhorst. He then received further training as a fighter pilot at the Jagdfliegerschule, the fighter pilot school at Stolp-Reitz. (Note: Flight training in the Luftwaffe progressed through the levels A1, A2 and B1, B2, referred to as A/B flight training. A training included theoretical and practical training in aerobatics, navigation, long-distance flights and dead-stick landings. The B courses included high-altitude flights, instrument flights, night landings and training to handle the aircraft in difficult situations.) At Stolp-Reitz, he befriended Helmut Bennemann, also from Wanne-Eickel, and Heinrich Füllgrabe.

On 25 April 1940, Grislawski made his maiden flight on the Messerschmitt Bf 109. Following 51 flights on the Bf 109, he received Pilot's Badge in early June. He was then posted to 2. Staffel (2nd squadron) of Ergänzungs-Jagdgruppe Merseburg, a supplementary training unit based at Merseburg. While based at Merseburg, he met his future wife Ilse Hartmeyer in the nearby town Leuna and befriended Hermann Graf. In July 1940, Grislawski was posted to III. Gruppe (3rd group) of Jagdgeschwader 52 (JG 52—52nd Fighter Wing), a squadron of III. Gruppe.

== World War II ==
World War II in Europe began on Friday 1 September 1939, when German forces invaded Poland. At the time of Grislawski's posting to III. Gruppe of JG 52, the unit had just moved to Zerbst following a brief deployment to English Channel. The Gruppe was initially commanded by Hauptmann Alexander von Winterfeldt before command passed to Major Gotthard Handrick in October. The rise of General Ion Antonescu in Romania in 1940 led to a reorganization of his country's armed forces. In this, he was supported by a military mission from Germany, the Luftwaffenmission Rumänien (Luftwaffe Mission Romania) under the command of Generalleutnant (equivalent to major general) Wilhelm Speidel.

On 1 October 1940, Grislawski was promoted to Unteroffizier (non-commissioned officer) and assigned to 9. Staffel. At the time, 9. Staffel was commanded by Oberleutnant Franz Hörnig. III. Gruppe of JG 52 was transferred to Bucharest in mid-October and temporarily renamed I. Gruppe of Jagdgeschwader 28 (JG 28—28th Fighter Wing) until 4 January 1941. Its primary task was to train Romanian Air Force personnel. Grislawski arrived at Pipera Airfield on 15 October where 9. Staffel stayed until 27 May 1941.

=== War against the Soviet Union ===
Following its brief deployment in the Balkan Campaign, III. Gruppe was back in Bucharest by mid-June. There, the unit was again subordinated to the Luftwaffenmission Rumänien and reequipped with the new, more powerful Bf 109 F-4 model. On 21 June, the Gruppe was ordered to Mizil in preparation of Operation Barbarossa, the German invasion of the Soviet Union. Its primary objective was to provide fighter protection for the oil fields and refineries at Ploiești.

9. Staffel also known as the Karaya-Staffel

On 1 August during the Battle of Kiev, III. Gruppe flew to Iași and then to Bila Tserkva in Ukraine and also used an airfield at Yampil from 6 to 8 August. On 27 August, the Gruppe then moved to an airfield named Stschasliwaja, a makeshift airfield located east of Kirovohrad and approximately 20 kilometers (12 miles) southeast of Aleksandriya, present-day Oleksandriia. There, Grislawski claimed his first aerial victory on 1 September, when he shot down a Soviet Polikarpov I-16 fighter near Kremenchuk. For this, he was awarded the Iron Cross 2nd Class (Eisernes Kreuz zweiter Klasse) on 9 September.

On 24 September, III. Gruppe moved to the Poltava Air Base, supporting the 17th Army in the First Battle of Kharkov. There, Grislawski claimed an I-16 fighter shot down north of Kharkov on 3 October, an I-26 fighter aircraft, later referred to as Yakovlev Yak-1 fighter, northeast of Krasnohrad on 5 October, a Vultee V-11 ground attack aircraft, probably referring to the Ilyushin Il-2, near Kharkov the next day, and an I-16 fighter and an Il-2 ground attack aircraft on 14 October.

On 23 October, Grislawski made an emergency landing in his Bf 109 F-4 (Werknummer 7038—factory number) near the Poltava Air Base. The same day, III. Gruppe relocated to Chaplynka in the Crimea. On 29 October, Grislawski awarded the Iron Cross 1st Class (Eisernes Kreuz erster Klasse). Flying from Chaplynka, he claimed two further aerial victories on 30 October, the Polikarpov I-153 fighter shot down near Simferopol was confirmed while the Polikarpov R-Z aircraft was not confirmed.

The Gruppe then moved to an airfield at Taganrog on 2 November where they stayed until 1 January 1942. In November the Red Army regrouped and conducted a well-orchestrated recapture of Rostov. Here, Grislawski received the Front Flying Clasp of the Luftwaffe for Fighter Pilots in Gold (Frontflugspange für Jäger in Gold) on 5 December. The following day, he claimed two I-16 fighters shot down followed by another I-16 fighter and a R-Z reconnaissance bomber two days later. On 1 January 1942, III. Gruppe relocated to Kharkov where they fought in the Barvenkovo–Lozovaya offensive and remained until 29 April.

Grislawski claimed his first aerial victory of 1942 and 12th overall on 4 January when he shot down a Kharkiv KhAI-5 reconnaissance and light bomber aircraft, also referred to as the R-10, near Kotschetowka, located approximately 5 kilometers (3.1 miles) north of Dobrinka. Three days later, Grislawski was promoted to Feldwebel (technical sergeant) and in mid-January, he was given home leave. He returned to his unit in late February which was still based at Kharkov. On 8 March, Grislawski claimed his next aerial victory on his sixteenth combat mission following his return from home leave. That day, he was credited with the destruction of a Yak-1 fighter.

On 29 April, III. Gruppe had relocated to Zürichtal, a small village at the Inhul in the former German settlement west of Feodosia in the Crimea during the Crimean campaign. On 1 May, the Gruppe was subordinated to VIII. Fliegerkorps and was supporting the 11th Army in the Battle of the Kerch Peninsula and the Siege of Sevastopol. Here, Grislawski claimed his 20th aerial victory on 30 April, when he shot down two Polikarpov I-15 fighters, one northeast of Feodosia and the second south of Kerch. On 5 May, Leutnant Gerhard Köppen was shot down over the Sea of Azov and was posted as missing in action. He was last seen swimming when two Soviet boats approached the area. In an attempt to save Köppen from capture, Grislawski made a strafing attack on the boats.

On 12 May, German forces launched Operation Fredericus, also referred to as the Second Battle of Kharkov, with the objective to eliminate the Izium bridgehead over Seversky Donets. That day, III. Gruppe was moved to the Kharkov-Rogan airfield, southeast of Kharkov, and subordinated to the Stab (headquarters unit) of JG 52. Two days later, III. Gruppe predominantly flew fighter escort missions for Junkers Ju 87 dive bombers from VIII. Fliegerkorps attacking Soviet ground forces on the northern pincer, and claimed 52 aerial victories for the loss of one aircraft damaged. That day, Grislawski claimed two Mikoyan-Gurevich MiG-1 fighters shot down. On 15 May, during two separate missions to Staryi Saltiv, he claimed another MiG-1 fighter and a Sukhoi Su-2 light bomber.

On 12 June, the Gruppe relocated to an airfield at Belgorod. Here, Grislawski flew his 250th combat mission, escorting a Henschel Hs 126 reconnaissance aircraft to Kozinka. On 1 July, Grislawski was awarded the Knight's Cross of the Iron Cross (Ritterkreuz des Eisernen Kreuzes). The presentation was made by Hauptmann Hubertus von Bonin, commander of III. Gruppe. Grislawski was one of four JG 52 pilots presented with the Knight's Cross that day. The other three pilots to receive the distinction that day were Feldwebel Karl Steffen, Oberleutnant Siegfried Simsch and Unteroffizier Karl Gratz.

=== Combat in the Caucasus ===
Following his return from home leave in late August, Grislawski was assigned to 7. Staffel of JG 52 which was then fighting in the Battle of the Caucasus. At the time, III. Gruppe was based at Gonschtakowka located north-northeast of Mozdok on the Terek in the Caucasus. Grislawski, who had arrived with his unit on 2 September, claimed his 43rd aerial when he shot down an I-16 fighter. (Note: According to Barbas, Grislawski had claimed his 43rd aerial victory on 23 June 1942 over a Mikoyan-Gurevich MiG-1 fighter near Kupiansk. The authors Prien, Stemmer, Rodeike and Bock also list this claim. Mathews and Foreman consider this claim unconfirmed. While this claim is not listed by Bergström, Antipov and Sundin.) Operating from Gonschtakowka over the Kuban bridgehead, he claimed a Douglas A-20 Havoc, also referred to DB-7 or Boston, on 5 September, a Boston bomber and a Yak-1 fighter on 6 September, four Boston bombers on 8 September, a MiG-1 and LaGG-3 fighter the next day. He filed further claims on 13, 14, 16 and 17 September, increasing his total to 58 aerial victories.

On 19 September 1942, III. Gruppe had relocated to an airfield named Soldatskaja, located approximately halfway between Mozdok and Pyatigorsk. The Gruppe stayed at this airfield until 1 January 1943. During this period, the pilots occasionally also operated from airfields at Mozdok (15, 18, 19, 21, 22 and 23 October) and from Digora (5 to 17 November 1942), supporting Army Group A in the Battle of the Caucasus. Here, Grislawski increased his number of aerial victories to 84 including four Il-2 ground attack aircraft claimed on 5 November. He was then shot down in his Bf 109 G-2 (Werknummer 14216) by anti-aircraft artillery resulting in a forced landing at Digora.

On 15 January 1943, 7. Staffel moved to Krasnodar Airfield. Three days later, Grislawski was shot by an I-16 fighter on a Ju 87 escort mission, forcing him to bail out of his Bf 109 G-2 (Werknummer 13909). On 26 January, Grislawski was promoted to Leutnant (second lieutenant), effective as of 1 December 1942, for courage against the enemy. On 10 February, 7. Staffel moved to Slavyansk-on-Kuban where Grislawski claimed his 94th aerial victory over a Pe-2 bomber that day. On 1 April, III. Gruppe moved to Taman. Here Grislawski claimed his 100th aerial victory on 27 April. He was the 36th Luftwaffe pilot to achieve the century mark.

On 4 June 1943, Grislawski was wounded by a blast from a German land mine near Taman. He, and fellow pilots Edmund Rossmann and Oskar Rydwal, were on the way to the beach for a swim in the Taman Bay when Rydwal had stepped on a mine. Both Rydwal and Grislwaski were seriously injured by the blast. Rossmann managed to take both of them back to airfield where they were immediately flown out to a hospital at Simferopol. There, Grislawski underwent surgery for the removal of 56 fragments from his body.

=== On the Western Front ===
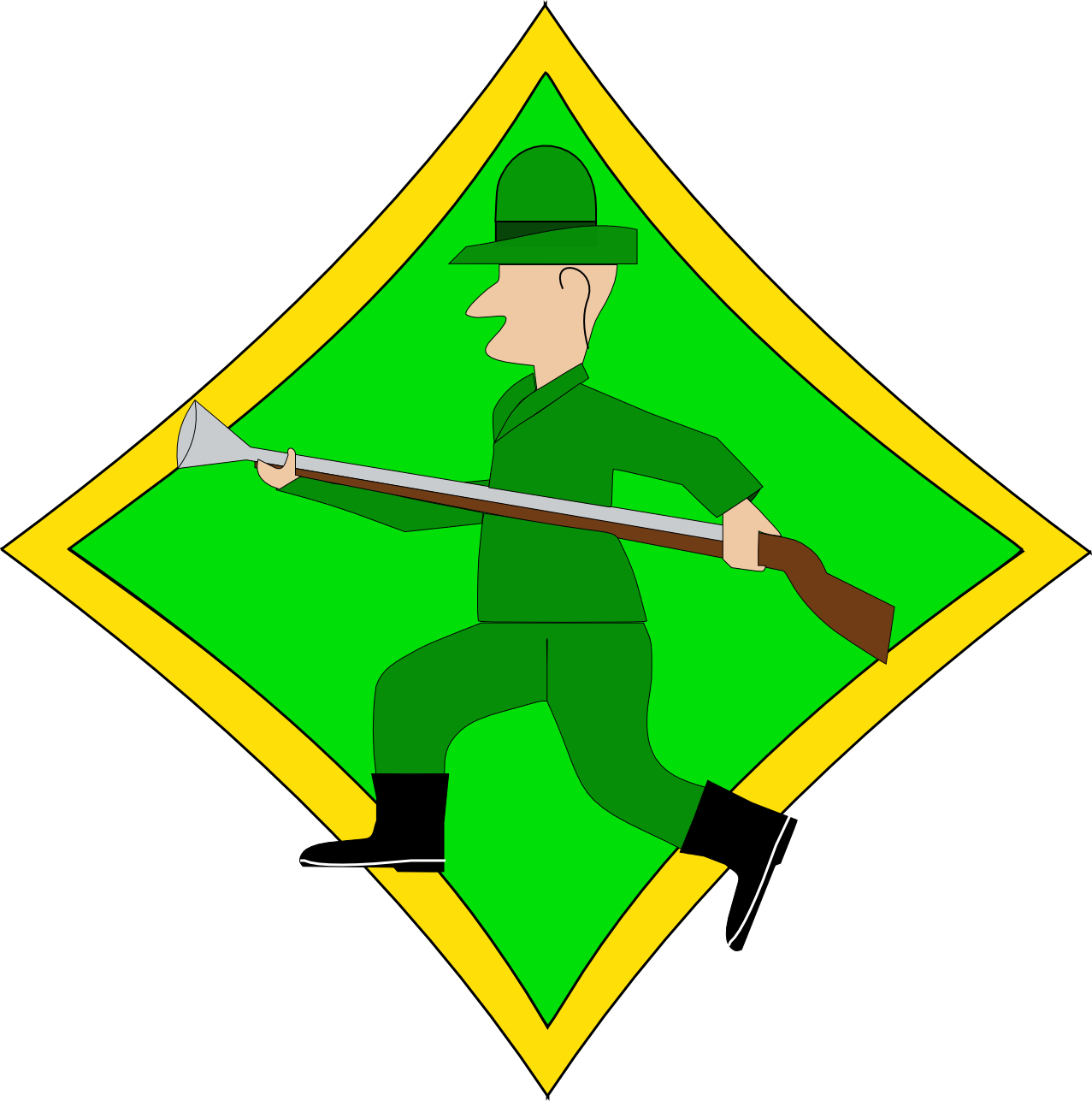
Grislawski's Bf 109 G-6 emblem with 1/JG 50.

Following a period of convalescence at the Wehrmacht hospital in Zaporozhye, present-day Zaporizhzhia, Grislawski was posted to the Western Front. He had received orders from Major Hermann Graf to report to the Wiesbaden-Erbenheim Airfield. Graf had been tasked with the creation of Jagdgruppe Süd (JGr Süd—Fighter Group South) in June 1943. The units primary objective was to intercept the high-flying Royal Air Force de Havilland Mosquito fighter-bomber and photo-reconnaissance aircraft. In August, the orders were augmented and JGr Süd was also tasked with combating the United States Army Air Forces (USAAF) heavy bombers in Defense of the Reich. Grislawski, who had arrived at Wiesbaden-Erbenheim Airfield on 5 August, was appointed Staffelkapitän (squadron leader) of the newly formed 1. Staffel of JGr Süd.

Grislawski claimed his first two aerial victories on the Western Front on 17 August 1943 when he shot down two Boeing B-17 Flying Fortress bombers. That day, the USAAF VIII Bomber Command, later renamed Eighth Air Force, aimed at crippling the German aircraft industry in what would become the Schweinfurt–Regensburg mission. JGr Süd intercepted the USAAF bombers at 11:45 near Mannheim. For 40 minutes, the unit attacked the bombers and for the loss of two pilots killed in action claimed five aerial victories including two B-17 bombers shot down by Grislawski.

On 15 August, the Luftwaffe ordered the redesignation of JGr Süd and ordered the expansion of the unit. In consequence, the unit was renamed to Jagdgeschwader 50 (JG 50—50th Fighter Wing) on 1 September, with Grislowski then commanding 1. Staffel of JG 50. On 6 September, the Eighth Air Force attacked the industrial areas of Stuttgart. The Stab and 1. Staffel intercepted the bombers northeast Stuttgart at 10:30. During the course of the battle, Grislawski claimed a B-17 bomber shot down.

On 1 October, Grislawski was promoted to the rank of Hauptmann (captain). He claimed his last aerial victory with JG 50 on 14 October during the second Schweinfurt raid. JG 50 intercepted the bombers at 14:20 north of Hanau. During this encounter, Grislawski shot down a B-17 bomber from the 100th Bombardment Group south of Schweinfurt. This was JG 50's last operational mission. During a staff meeting held by the General der Jagdflieger held on 22 October it was decided that the JG 50 would be redesignated to I. Gruppe of Jagdgeschwader 301 (JG 301—301st Fighter Wing).

=== In defense of the Reich ===
On 6 November 1943, Grislawski was transferred and appointed Staffelkapitän of 1. Staffel of Jagdgeschwader 1 "Udet" (JG 1—1st Fighter Wing) based at Deelen Air Base. He replaced Oberleutnant Rudolf Engleder who was transferred. The Staffel was subordinated to I. Gruppe of JG 1 which was commanded by Hauptmann Emil Schnoor. Grislawski claimed his first aerial victory with JG 1 on 29 November. That day 360 B-17 bombers of the 1st and 3rd Bombardment Division, escorted by 352 fighter aircraft, attacked Bremen. Luftwaffe fighters were scrambled at 13:40. I. Gruppe intercepted the bombers west of Bremen. For the loss of four of their own, including two pilots killed, the Gruppe shot down two B-17 bombers, including one claimed by Grislawski.

On 1 December, he was credited with the destruction of two B-17 bombers. That day, the USAAF bombers headed to Solingen. On 11 January, the USAAF VIII Bomber Command attacked German aircraft manufacturing at Halberstadt, Magdeburg, Oschersleben and Braunschweig. In total 663 heavy bombers, escorted by 592 fighter aircraft were dispatched. I. Gruppe of JG 1 engaged the USAAF bombers in the area of southern Lower Saxony. In this encounter, Grislawski claimed a B-17 shot down.

III./JG 1 emblem

He claimed one victory and was then shot down by USAAF bombers over Baske on 24 January 1944 and wounded, bailing out of his Focke-Wulf Fw 190 A-7 "White 1" (Werknummer 430 167). Following his convalescence, he was posted as Staffelkapitän to 8. Staffel of JG 1 on 13 March 1944, a Staffel of III. Gruppe, thus succeeding Oberleutnant Heinrich Overhagen who had been killed in a flying accident. Operating the new Bf 109 G-6/AS especially equipped for high-altitude operations, the unit was tasked with combating the potent USAAF fighter escorts. On 9 April, he shot down two B-17 bombers of the 45th Combat Bombardment Wing near Schleswig. On 22 April, the USAAF Eighth Air Force sent 803 heavy bombers against German ground transportation, primarily targeting the marshaling yard in Hamm. JG 1 was scrambled at 17:45 and vectored to vectored to a point of intercept over the Rothaar Mountains where III. Gruppe ran into a large formation of North American P-51 Mustang fighters. For the loss of twelve of their own, III. Gruppe pilots claimed four P-51 fighters shot down, including one by Grislawski.

Grislawski had been awarded the Knight's Cross of the Iron Cross with Oak Leaves (Ritterkreuz des Eisernen Kreuzes mit Eichenlaub) on 11 April, the 446th soldier to receive this distinction. The presentation was made by Adolf Hitler at the Berghof, Hitler's residence in the Obersalzberg of the Bavarian Alps, on 5 May 1944. Also present at the ceremony were Anton Hafner, Otto Kittel, Günther Schack, Emil Lang, Erich Rudorffer, Martin Möbus, Wilhelm Herget, Hans-Karl Stepp, Rudolf Schoenert, Günther Radusch, Otto Pollmann and Fritz Breithaupt, who all received the Oak Leaves on this date. Following the Oak Leaves presentation, Grislawski was given home leave and married his fiancée Ilse Hartmeyer on 20 May.

On 6 June 1944, Allied forces launched the invasion of Normandy in Operation Overlord. The following day, Hauptmann Karl-Heinz Weber, the commander of III. Gruppe of JG 1, was killed in action. In consequence, Grislawski was temporarily appointed Gruppenkommandeur (group commander) of the Gruppe on 7 June. Command of the Gruppe was then officially passed on to Hauptmann Erich Woitke. On 13 July, Grislawski claimed a Hawker Typhoon shot down near Caen. The Typhoon belonged to the RAF Second Tactical Air Force and was piloted by Flying Officer Kenneth Trott from No. 197 Squadron who was captured and taken prisoner of war. On 27 July, Grislawski and his wingman Unteroffizier Werner Moser were attacking P-51 fighters when they came under attack from Spitfire fighters from the Royal Canadian Air Force (RCAF) No. 401 Squadron. Both Grislawski and Moser bailed out with Grislawski sustaining only minor injuries while Moser was severely wounded. Grislawski claimed his last aerial victory over France on 12 August. His opponent was Lieutenant Pierre Leplang from RAF No. 340 (Free French) Squadron who was killed in action.

On 12 August 1944, Grislawski was transferred and replaced Hauptmann Karl Leonhard as Staffelkapitän of 11. Staffel of Jagdgeschwader 53 (JG 53—53rd Fighter Wing). Command of 8. Staffel of JG 1 was then passed to Oberleutnant Elmar Resch. Grislawski claimed two B-17 bombers shot down on 12 September. That day, the USAAF had sent more than 800 bombers to attack the German synthetic-fuel factories at Böhlen, Brüx, present-day Most, Magdeburg-Rothensee, Misburg, now part of Hanover, and Ruhland. III. Gruppe of JG 53, along with elements of Jagdgeschwader 300 (JG 300—300th Fighter Wing), Jagdgeschwader 3 (JG 3—3rd Fighter Wing) and II. Gruppe of Jagdgeschwader 27 (JG 27—27th Fighter Wing), had intercepted the bombers of the 3rd Bombardment Division.

On 26 September 1944, Grislawski was credited with a P-38 twin-engine fighter shot down as his 133rd and last claim. His Bf 109 G-14 (Werknummer 462649) was hit in the engine by a P-51 flown by Col. Hubert Zemke and caught fire. Grislawski bailed out, fearing that he would be shot in his parachute, he deployed his parachute at low altitude and hit the ground very hard. He was taken to a hospital at Haltern where he was diagnosed, indicating that his second and third vertebrae were cracked. Two days later, he was moved to a hospital at Gelsenkirchen-Buer, and then for further treatment to Gotha. While Grislawski was in Gotha, his wife Ilse gave birth to their daughter Ingrid, born on 24 October 1944. In early-1945, Grislawski was taken to Badgastein in the Austrian Alps for convalescence. Following the German surrender in May 1945, he was taken in US custody and taken to a POW camp in Salzburg where he was interrogated and released later that month.

== Later life ==
After his release, Grislawski travelled to Leuna, which at the time was still occupied by the First United States Army, to rejoin his wife and child. When it became apparent that Leuna would fall under Soviet jurisdiction as part of the Soviet occupation zone, Grislawski fearing further prosecution decided to travel to his hometown of Wanne-Eickel which was then part of the British occupation zone. There, the family was reunited again in 1946. Grislawski worked as a truck driver and later as a janitor at the Gymnasium Wanne, at the time an all girls secondary school. He declined to join the Bundesluftwaffe because of his wartime injuries. Grislawski died on 19 September 2003 in Herne.

== Summary of career ==
=== Aerial victory claims ===
According to US historian David T. Zabecki, Grislawski was credited with 132 aerial victories. Spick and Weal list him with 133 aerial victories. Obermaier also lists Grislawski with 133 aerial victories claimed in 795 combat missions, including 175 close air support missions. He claimed 109 victories over the Eastern Front. Of his 24 victories claimed over the Western Front, eighteen were four-engined bombers. Mathews and Foreman, authors of Luftwaffe Aces — Biographies and Victory Claims, researched the German Federal Archives and found records for 127 aerial victory claims, plus one further unconfirmed claim. This figure includes 108 aerial victories on the Eastern Front and 19 on the Western Front, including 14 four-engined bombers

=== Awards ===
- Iron Cross (1939)
  - 2nd Class (9 September 1941)
  - 1st Class (29 October 1941)
- Honor Goblet of the Luftwaffe on 1 July 1942 as Feldwebel and pilot (Note: According to Obermaier and Stockert on 30 May 1942.)
- Front Flying Clasp of the Luftwaffe for Fighter Pilots
  - in Gold (5 December 1941)
  - in Gold with Pennant (15 May 1943)
- Knight's Cross of the Iron Cross with Oak Leaves
  - Knight's Cross on 1 July 1942 as Feldwebel and pilot in the 9./Jagdgeschwader 52
  - 446th Oak Leaves on 11 April 1944 as Hauptmann (war officer) and Staffelkapitän of 1./Jagdgeschwader 1

=== Dates of rank ===
1 October 1940:	Unteroffizier (Subordinate Officer)
7 January 1942:	Feldwebel (Technical Sergeant), effective as of 1 January 1942
1 August 1942:	Oberfeldwebel (Master Sergeant)
26 January 1943:	Leutnant (Second Lieutenant), effective as of 1 December 1942
1 June 1943:	Oberleutnant (First Lieutenant)
1 October 1943:	Hauptmann (Captain)
