= Hotel Clausewitz =

1967 film by Ralph Habib

- Directed by: Ralph Habib
- Written by: Franz Baake; Nero Brandenburg
- Produced by: Raphael Nussbaum
- Starring: Wolfgang Kieling; Maria Brockerhoff; Friedrich Schoenfelder
- Cinematography: Wolfgang Bellenbaum
- Edited by: Edith Dagan
- Music by: Horst A. Hass
- Production company: Aero Film
- Distributed by: Pallas Film
- Release date: 28 April 1967
- Running time: 89 minutes
- Country: West Germany
- Language: German

Hotel Clausewitz (German: Pension Clausewitz) is a 1967 West German comedy film directed by Ralph Habib and starring Wolfgang Kieling, Maria Brockerhoff and Friedrich Schoenfelder.

== Plot ==
The main character of the story, Stemmka, through an inheritance, becomes the owner of a West Berlin brothel, called "Pension Schölermann". In order to refresh the "establishment", Stemmka immediately hires two attractive young ladies. One of them is Marlies, whose fiancé, Werner, is stuck in East Berlin and was prevented from escaping to the West. Not only is the brothel used for erotic encounters, it also becomes the meeting place of the intelligence services. Among the clients are a West-German nuclear scientist, a Stasi officer, a representative of the CIA and his communist opponent from beyond the Iron Curtain.

Marlies wants to free Werner from the Stasi's grip and therefore agrees to cooperate with the GDR, passing on the secrets she learns from pillow talk to the communist enemy. Her spying ends when her fiancé escapes from the east to the city's western sector. Now they can turn the tide and help the Western Allies smash the East German ring of agents.

== Production ==
Pension Clausewitz, also known as Hotel Clausewitz, was filmed in February and March 1967 in Berlin and premiered on April 28, 1967. The story was inspired by the events surrounding the real Pension Clausewitz, which caused a veritable scandal at the end of 1964. In order not to give the impression of a faithful retelling of the actual events, the Pension Clausewitz was called Schölermann in the film.

The FSK credits the film with the "staggering persiflage, which often turns into a fuss," mellowing the portrayal of delicate situations and frivolous utterances. Nevertheless, several scenes had to be cut, in which the bosoms of striptease dancers was seen.

The comedian Karl Dall had a cameo appearance in the film as a pimp with two words dialog text: "poaching, wa" His three colleagues of comedy combo Insterburg & Co. also have cameo appearances, but were little more than extras.

== Cast ==
- Wolfgang Kieling as Stemmka
- Maria Brockerhoff as Marlies
- Friedrich Schoenfelder as Dr. Rudolf Zabel
- Herbert Fux as Dr. Schlack
- Rolf Eden as Langer
- Maria Vincent as Monika
- Doris Bierett as Dagmar
- Klaus Dahlen as Babyface
- Wilhelm von Homburg as American
- Michael Miller as Werner
- Ralf Gregan as SSD Officer
- Ekkehard Fritsch as Rehbock
- Michael Symo as Baron Holloschy
- Anna Gaël as Rita
- Johanna König as Frau Steeger
- Harald Lutz
- Hein Riess as Boxer
- Gerhard Soor as Weichmann
- Susanne Hsiao as Dagmar-Girl
- Roswitha Beech as Dagmar-Girl
- Max Teschké as Pastor
- Waldemar Frahm as Lawyer
- Grit Ellot as Lissy
- Klaus Profé as Commissioner
- Charles Hans Vogt as Man with Dog
- Hardy Schnelle as Decorator
- Karl Dall as Pimp
- Ingo Insterburg as Prediger
- Jürgen Barz as Statist
- Peter Ehlebracht as Statist

Cast list from Filmportal.de and World Filmography 1967.

== Bibliography ==
- Cowie, Peter; Elley, Derek (1977). World Filmography: 1967. Fairleigh Dickinson Univ Press. ISBN 9780498015656.
- Kniep, Jürgen (2010). "Keine Jugendfreigabe!": Filmzensur in Westdeutschland 1949-1990 (in German). Wallstein. ISBN 9783835306387.
- Rège, Philippe (2009). Encyclopedia of French Film Directors Volume 1 (in French). Scarecrow Press. ISBN 9780810869394.
- Weniger, Kay (2001). Das grosse Personenlexikon des Films: Bd. F-H, Barry Fitzgerald-Ernst Hofbauer (in German). Schwarzkopf & Schwarzkopf.
