= Rote Jäger =

German military football club

The footballers adopted a variant of the brigade emblem of the Luftlandebrigade 26.

The Rote Jäger (Red Hunters) were a short-lived German military football club active during World War II (August 1943 – November 1944). The team was assembled by Hermann Graf, a fighter ace and commander of German fighter pilots. Based near Hamburg, the unit developed into a refuge from service on the Eastern front for some Germany national team players.

== History ==
Unlike some other military teams, such as Luftwaffen-SV Hamburg, the side did not participate in regular German league play or take part in national championship play, but instead staged a series of exhibition matches in Germany, as well as a few in Hungary, Alsace (France), and Poland.

The genesis of the team was in a challenge made by an elite Romanian army side to Graf, who managed the German military side in the country. Graf trained with Germany's national side before the war and he decided to contact his former coach, Sepp Herberger, who – to the surprise of the Romanians – brought along several members of the side to take part in the match, which the Germans won 3:2 in front of 40,000 in Bucharest.

By 1943, Graf had decided to act to save as many of the national team's players as he could from frontline service, attaching them to his unit – the Luftlandebrigade 26 (en: 26th Airborne Brigade) – as "technical experts". Among those who played for the Jäger was Fritz Walter who would go on to fame with 1. FC Kaiserslautern and earn 61 caps with Germany. He wrote the book 11 Rote Jäger about his experiences.

German military clubs were disbanded in September 1944 as Allied armies began their advance into the country. Still, the Rote Jäger managed to play two more games in Kraków in November 1944, the last of these in front of 20,000 German soldiers.

== Postwar re-establishment ==
A successor side was established 21 May 1965 by the Luftlandebrigade 26 of the German Army with the support of former players of the original side. The new Rote Jäger, based in Zweibrücken, debuted in a friendly match versus then Bundesliga side 1. FC Kaiserslautern (0:2). The club played as a demonstration side and in armed forces competition, drawing its players from recruits doing military service. Recognizable names who donned the club's jersey during their service terms before going on to professional careers and national team appearances include Felix Magath, Wolfgang Seel, Heinz Simmet, and Andreas Brehme. The club was disbanded in October 1991.

== The squad (1943–45) ==
- Walter Bammes – forward SpVgg Fürth
- Hermann Eppenhoff – forward FC Schalke 04
- Karl Flinner – goalkeeper SV Wilhelmshaven
- Hermann Graf – goalkeeper
- Gredel – midfielder Mannheim
- Friedrich Hack – midfielder TSV 1860 München
- Franz Hanreiter – forward Admira Wien
- Josef (Sepp) Herberger – coach Germany national team
- Karlheinz Höger – goalkeeper Hamburger SV, SV Dessau 05
- Werner Humpert – midfielder Sportfreunde Dresden
- Bruno Klaffke – midfielder Duisburger FV
- Siegfried "Friedel" Klagges – defender Wattenscheid 09
- Hermann Koch – defender TSV Schwaben Augsburg
- Karl Köhler – goalkeeper FC Hanau 93
- Richard Leonhard – forward SC Planitz
- Alfons Moog – midfielder VfL Köln 99
- Wilhelm Thiele – goalkeeper OrPo Chemnitz
- Fritz Walter – forward 1. FC Kaiserslautern
- Walter Zwickhofer – defender FC Schalke 04
