= Gerhard Köppen =

German World War II flying ace (1918–1942)

- Köppen as a Leutnant
- Born: 17 May 1918; Holzendorf
- Died: 5 May 1942 (aged 23) over the Sea of Azov, Russia
- Military career
- Allegiance: Nazi Germany
- Branch: Luftwaffe
- Service years: 1936–1942
- Rank: Leutnant (second lieutenant)
- Unit: JG 52
- Conflicts: World War II: Operation Barbarossa; Battle of the Kerch Peninsula †
- Awards: Knight's Cross of the Iron Cross with Oak Leaves

Gerhard Köppen (17 May 1918 – 5 May 1942) was a German Luftwaffe military aviator during World War II. As a fighter ace, he was credited with 85 aerial victories claimed in 380 combat missions.

Born in Holzendorf, Köppen joined military service in 1936 and initially served with a bomber before he was trained as a fighter pilot. He was then posted to Jagdgeschwader 52 (JG 52—52nd Fighter Wing) in 1941. Köppen claimed his first aerial victories on 24 June 1941 during Operation Barbarossa, the German invasion of the Soviet Union. Following his 45th aerial victory, he was nominated for the Knight's Cross of the Iron Cross which he received on 18 December 1942. On 27 February 1942, Köppen was awarded the Knight's Cross of the Iron Cross with Oak Leaves after 72 aerial victories and promoted to an officers rank. On 5 May 1942, he was posted missing in action after he made a forced landing in the Sea of Azov.

== Military career ==
Köppen was born on 17 May 1918, in Holzendorf, present-day part of Kuhlen-Wendorf, at the time in the Grand Duchy of Mecklenburg-Schwerin within the German Empire. He joined the military service in 1936. His initial posting was with Kampfgeschwader 1 "Hindenburg" (KG 1–1st Bomber Wing) before he was selected for fighter pilot conversion training in 1939. Following flight training, (Note: Flight training in the Luftwaffe progressed through the levels A1, A2 and B1, B2, referred to as A/B flight training. A training included theoretical and practical training in aerobatics, navigation, long-distance flights and dead-stick landings. The B courses included high-altitude flights, instrument flights, night landings and training to handle the aircraft in difficult situations.) he was posted to the 8. Staffel (8th squadron) of Jagdgeschwader 52 (JG 52—52nd Fighter Wing), a squadron of III. Gruppe, on 6 October 1940. At the time, 8. Staffel was commanded by Oberleutnant Günther Rall and the Gruppe was headed by Major Gotthard Handrick. Until 12 October, the Gruppe was based at Schönwalde-Glien near Berlin where the pilots continued their training.

The rise of General Ion Antonescu in Romania in 1940 led to a reorganization of his country's armed forces. In this, he was supported by a military mission from Germany, the Luftwaffenmission Rumänien (Luftwaffe Mission Romania) under the command of Generalleutnant (equivalent to major general) Wilhelm Speidel. III. Gruppe of JG 52 was transferred to Bucharest in mid-October and temporarily renamed I. Gruppe of Jagdgeschwader 28 (JG 28—28th Fighter Wing) until 4 January 1941. Its primary task was to train Romanian Air Force personnel.

=== Eastern Front ===
Following its brief deployment in the Balkan Campaign, III. Gruppe was ordered to Bucharest by mid-June. There, the unit was again subordinated to the Luftwaffenmission Rumänien and reequipped with the new, more powerful Messerschmitt Bf 109 F-4 model. On 21 June 1941, the Gruppe was ordered to Mizil in preparation of Operation Barbarossa, the German invasion of the Soviet Union. Its primary objective was to provide fighter protection for the oil fields and refineries at Ploiești. The invasion of the Soviet Union began on 22 June. The next day, the Gruppe moved to Mamaia, the northern district of Constanța on the Black Sea coast. There, Köppen claimed his first two aerial victories on 24 June. He was credited with shooting down two Soviet Ilyushin DB-3 bombers in the morning near Constanța. Two days later, he again claimed two DB-3 bombers in that combat area.

III./JG 52 emblem

The Gruppe moved to Belaya Tserkov on 1 August during the Battle of Kiev and also used an airfield at Yampil from 6 to 8 August. There, Köppen claimed a Polikarpov I-16 fighter on 2 August and another I-16 fighter on 4 August near Kiev. On 6 August, he claimed an aerial victory over Polikarpov I-16 fighter. Three days later, two Tupolev SB-2 bombers were claimed by him followed by two further SB-2 bombers on 17 August. He claimed his twelfth aerial victory on 19 August over a Mikoyan-Gurevich MiG-3 fighter. This put him in second place within III. Gruppe with respect to number of aerial victories claimed, one behind his Staffelkapitän (squadron leader) Oberleutnant Günther Rall. On 27 August, III. Gruppe had reached an airfield named Stschastliwaja located approximately 20 kilometers (12 miles) east-southeast of Oleksandriia. In the early morning of 2 September, elements of III. Gruppe moved to Myronivka where they escorted Junkers Ju 87 dive bombers heading for Novomoskovsk. Near Kremenchuk on the Dnieper, Köppen claimed two Vultee V-11 attack aircraft shot down.

On 12 September, 8. and 9. Staffel moved to an airfield at Beryslav, staying there for three days. Here, Köppen claimed two Polikarpov I-153 fighters shot down, one on 13 September and another the next day. By 23 September, Köppen had increased his number of aerial victories to 17. The next day, III. Gruppe moved to the Poltava Air Base, supporting the 17th Army in the First Battle of Kharkov. Köppen's total number of aerial victories stood at 31 on 23 October, making him the leading fighter pilot of III. Gruppe at the time.

On 2 November, the Gruppe moved to Taganrog where they stayed until 1 January 1942. On 18 December 1941, Köppen was awarded the Knight's Cross of the Iron Cross (Ritterkreuz des Eisernen Kreuzes), the first pilot of III. Gruppe to receive the distinction. He had qualified for this distinction after 40 aerial victories. The presentation was made by General der Flieger Kurt Pflugbeil. By the end of 1941, his total number of aerial victories had increased to 62, making him the most successful fighter pilot of III. Gruppe.

=== Oak Leaves and death ===
Köppen claimed four aircraft shot down on 24 February 1942, and was decorated with Knight's Cross of the Iron Cross with Oak Leaves (Ritterkreuz des Eisernen Kreuzes mit Eichenlaub) after 72 aerial victories on 27 February 1942. He was the second non-commissioned officer and 79th member of the Wehrmacht to be so honored. The presentation was made by Adolf Hitler, who also promoted him to Leutnant effective as of 1 April 1942.

On 29 April, III. Gruppe had relocated to Zürichtal, a small village at the Inhul in the former German settlement west of Feodosia in the Crimea during the Crimean campaign. On 1 May, the Gruppe was subordinated to VIII. Fliegerkorps and was supporting the 11th Army in the Battle of the Kerch Peninsula and the Siege of Sevastopol. The next day, Köppen became an "ace-in-a-day", claiming five Soviet fighter aircraft shot down.

Following combat with a Petlyakov Pe-2 on 5 May, Köppen was posted as missing in action flying Messerschmitt Bf 109 F-4 "white 4" (Werknummer 7303—factory number) 10 km (6.2 mi) north of Ak-Monai (present-day Kam'yans'ke) near the Arabat Fortress. He was last seen swimming in the Sea of Azov when Soviet boats closed in on him. Feldwebel Alfred Grislawski made a strafing attack on these boats. Köppen was officially declared dead on 30 May 1969 by a court in Dillingen. His brother, Eckhardt Köppen, was killed in action on 15 January 1945; he was posthumously awarded the Knight's Cross on 15 March 1945.

== Summary of career ==
=== Aerial victory claims ===
According to US historian David T. Zabecki, Köppen was credited with 86 aerial victories. Spick lists Köppen with 85 aerial victories claimed in an unknown number of combat missions. All of his victories were recorded over the Eastern Front. Mathews and Foreman, authors of Luftwaffe Aces – Biographies and Victory Claims, researched the German Federal Archives and found documentation for 85 aerial victory claims, all of which claimed on the Eastern Front.

Chronicle of aerial victories
This and the ♠ (Ace of spades) indicates those aerial victories which made Köppen an "ace-in-a-day", a term which designates a fighter pilot who has shot down five or more airplanes in a single day.
Claim	Date	Time	Type	Location	Claim	Date	Time	Type	Location
– 8. Staffel of Jagdgeschwader 52 – Operation Barbarossa — 22 June – 5 December 1941
1	24 June 1941	07:30	DB-3	vicinity of Constanța	25	2 October 1941	09:39	I-61 (MiG-3)	
2	24 June 1941	07:50	DB-3	vicinity of Constanța	26	4 October 1941	12:00	R-10 (Seversky)	
3	26 June 1941	05:50	DB-3	vicinity of Constanța	27	4 October 1941	12:40	R-10 (Seversky)	
4	26 June 1941	05:55	DB-3	vicinity of Constanța	28	5 October 1941	16:33	R-10 (Seversky)	
5	2 August 1941	05:05	I-16		29	5 October 1941	16:36	R-10 (Seversky)	
6	4 August 1941	05:55	I-16		30	14 October 1941	10:10	V-11 (Il-2)	
7	6 August 1941	10:30	I-15		31	23 October 1941	13:34	I-61 (MiG-3)	
8	9 August 1941	05:33	SB-2		32	25 October 1941	15:20	I-61 (MiG-3)	
9	9 August 1941	05:48	SB-2		33	25 October 1941	15:23	I-61 (MiG-3)	
10	17 August 1941	18:54	SB-2		34	28 October 1941	06:50	Pe-2	
11	17 August 1941	18:56	SB-2		35	31 October 1941	16:01	I-61 (MiG-3)	southeast of Simferopol
12	19 August 1941	05:50	MiG-3		36	8 November 1941	11:40	I-61 (MiG-3)	
13	2 September 1941	12:10	V-11 (Il-2)	east of Kremenchuk	37	9 November 1941	13:52	I-18 (MiG-1)	
14	2 September 1941	12:15	V-11 (Il-2)	east of Kremenchuk	38	9 November 1941	13:55	I-26 (Yak-1)	
15	13 September 1941	13:00	I-153		39	16 November 1941	13:42	I-26 (Yak-1)	
16	14 September 1941	17:45	I-153		40	16 November 1941	13:43	I-26 (Yak-1)	
17	18 September 1941	15:30	I-16		41	23 November 1941	13:38	Il-2	southeast of Rostov
18	24 September 1941	07:43	MiG-3	2 km (1.2 mi) south of Chudovo	42	27 November 1941	12:45	I-16	
19	24 September 1941	07:45	SB-2		43	29 November 1941	07:28	I-16	
20	24 September 1941	09:50	SB-2		44	1 December 1941	15:03	DB-3	
21	26 September 1941	13:24	R-10 (Seversky)		45	2 December 1941	08:15	I-61 (MiG-3)	
22	26 September 1941	13:25	R-10 (Seversky)		46	2 December 1941	12:10	I-16	
23	27 September 1941	10:38	DB-3	east of Poltava	47	5 December 1941	10:09	I-16	
24	27 September 1941	15:20	DB-3	west of Poltava	48	5 December 1941	10:41	I-61 (MiG-3)	
– 8. Staffel of Jagdgeschwader 52 – Eastern Front — 6 December 1941 – 25 April 1942
49	6 December 1941	08:31	I-16		61	22 December 1941	15:05	I-16	
50	7 December 1941	13:52	I-16		62	22 December 1941	15:10	I-16	
51	8 December 1941	09:50	I-15		63	15 February 1942	14:04	Pe-2	
52	8 December 1941	09:50	I-15		64	15 February 1942	15:48	I-61 (MiG-3)	
53	8 December 1941	13:10	I-16		65	15 February 1942	15:51	Il-2	
54	9 December 1941	12:31	I-15		66	18 February 1942	08:50	I-26 (Yak-1)	
55	9 December 1941	12:32	I-15		67	18 February 1942	08:52	I-26 (Yak-1)	
56	9 December 1941	12:36	I-15		68	21 February 1942	12:32	I-16	
57	9 December 1941	12:45	SB-2		69	22 February 1942	15:35	V-11 (Il-2)	
58	11 December 1941	09:35	SB-3		70	22 February 1942	15:37	V-11 (Il-2)	
59	11 December 1941	13:34	I-26 (Yak-1)		71	22 February 1942	15:39	I-26 (Yak-1)	
60	11 December 1941	13:40	SB-2		72	22 February 1942	15:42	U-2	
– 7. Staffel of Jagdgeschwader 52 – Eastern Front — 25 April – 5 May 1942
73	25 April 1942	11:40	I-16		80♠	2 May 1942	04:36	I-15	
74	29 April 1942	17:55	I-153		81♠	2 May 1942	05:08	I-153	
75	30 April 1942	16:45	I-61 (MiG-3)		82♠	2 May 1942	08:55	I-153	
76	1 May 1942	04:30	R-5		83♠	2 May 1942	18:05	I-61 (MiG-3)	
77	1 May 1942	04:31	Su-2 (Seversky)		84♠	2 May 1942	18:10	I-16	
78	1 May 1942	04:34	Su-2 (Seversky)		85	5 May 1942	11:13	MiG-1	
79	1 May 1942	04:58	I-61 (MiG-3)						

=== Awards ===
- Iron Cross (1939) 2nd and 1st Class
- Honor Goblet of the Luftwaffe on 17 November 1941 as Feldwebel and pilot
- German Cross in Gold on 15 December 1941 as Feldwebel in the 8./Jagdgeschwader 52
- Knight's Cross of the Iron Cross with Oak Leaves
  - Knight's Cross on 18 December 1941 as Feldwebel and pilot in the 7./Jagdgeschwader 52 (Note: According to Scherzer as pilot in the 8./Jagdgeschwader 52.)
  - 79th Oak Leaves on 27 February 1942 as Feldwebel and pilot in the 8./Jagdgeschwader 52
