= Peter Garden =

German actor (1924–2015)

- Born: Karl-Heinz Rothmayer; 17 August 1924; Munich, Germany
- Died: 7 January 2015 (aged 90); Munich, Germany
- Occupations: Actor, singer
- Years active: 1947-1970 (stage, film & TV)

Peter Garden (born Karl-Heinz Rothmayer; 1924–2015) was a popular German stage, television, film actor and singer.

== Background ==
whose career ended abruptly in 1970 when it was revealed by some of his victims that he had worked in 1944 as a paid Gestapo informant in Salzburg, Austria.

Garden, under his birth name Rothmayer, had already been investigated by a Berlin, Germany, state prosecutor between 1967 and 1970 for aiding and abetting murder, because two people he had denounced to the Gestapo had been sentenced to death, and executed. The prosecutor closed the case without taking further action.

== Career ==
According to the 6 February 1971 issue of Cash Box, Garden was one of the artists that would be releasing recordings through the BASF record label.

== Selected filmography ==
- The False Adam (1955)
- Ball at the Savoy (1955)
- My Leopold (1955)
- How Do I Become a Film Star? (1955)
- Fruit in the Neighbour's Garden (1956)
- I'll See You at Lake Constance (1956)
- Hugo, the Woman Chaser (1969)

== Bibliography ==
- Cowie, Peter. Variety International Film Guide 1970. Tantivy Press, 1969.
