= Hans Helmcke =

German pimp and brothel owner (1917–1973)

- Born: Hans Heinrich Helmcke; 1917; Cuxhaven, German Empire
- Died: 16 August 1973 (aged 55–56); St. Pauli, Hamburg, West Germany
- Occupation: Pimp
- Years active: 1960–1973

Hans Heinrich Helmcke (1917, Cuxhaven – 16 August 1973, Hamburg) was an influential West Berlin pimp and brothel owner. He was murdered by rival pimps.

== Biography ==
Helmcke, son of a Cuxhaven grocer emigrated to the United States in 1953. In 1959, under dubious circumstances, he received an inheritance of 250,000 dollars (at that time more than one million Deutschmarks) and returned to Germany.

Helmcke, who dominated Berlin's red-light district in the postwar period, came to fame as the operator of the Pension Clausewitz, a luxury brothel he had acquired with part of his inheritance at the beginning of the 1960s. He came into the public eye when, in 1965, the Pension Clausewitz had to close because there were accusations that the Stasi used the brothel for espionage purposes. Nonetheless, Helmcke remained the kingpin in the red-light underworld, and was known as the Brothel King and the King of Berlin.

In addition to prostitution, Helmcke was also active in drug trafficking and gambling. He also tried to use his contacts with the business world and the political circles of West Berlin, both closely intertwined, for profitable investments in real estate and construction projects. He invested three million deutschmarks in the construction of the Steglitzer Kreisel. When it became apparent in 1970 that the project could fail, and invested funds would have been lost, Helmcke commissioned the assassination of the architect Sigrid Kressmann-Zschach. However, the contract never came to fruition.

On 27 June of the same year Helmcke was involved in an armed conflict with Iranian pimps, over supremacy in the West Berlin red-light district. The firefight on Bleibtreustraße caused one fatality and three others were injured.

== Death ==
On 14 August 1973 Hans Helmcke was lured to an apartment in Mathildenstraße in the St. Pauli district of Hamburg by some younger pimps and held captive. Two days later, on the 16 August, after failing to agree to their demands, he was strangled with his own tie. They tried to burn the body in a fire at a salvage yard, but the fire was prematurely extinguished as the yard didn't have a permit for outdoor fires. Two days later his partially burned body was found on the edge of Bundesautobahn 1 between Hamburg and Lübeck. Heinz-Uwe Röhl, Röhl's former wife Bärbel and Franz Holzer stood trial for his murder.

== Bibliography ==
- Prodöhl, Günter (1979). Der lieblose Tod des Bordellkönigs: Verbrechen, d. Schlagzeilen machten (in German). Verlag Das Neue Berlin.
- Rixdorf, Werner (1995). Klaus Speer: eine Legende? (in German). Verlag Das Neue Berlin. ISBN 9783359007715.
