= The Magnificent Tony Carrera =

- Original theatrical poster
- Directed by: José Antonio de la Loma
- Written by: José Antonio de la Loma; Guido Leoni
- Produced by: Julian Muro Navarro
- Starring: Thomas Hunter
- Cinematography: Victor Monreal
- Music by: Gianni Marchetti
- Release date: 1968

The Magnificent Tony Carrera (Spanish: El magnífico Tony Carrera, German: Carrera - Das Geheimnis der blonden Katze, Italian: Il magnifico Tony Carrera) is a 1968 Spanish-German-Italian Eurospy film written and directed by José Antonio de la Loma and starring Thomas Hunter. It was originally shot in 70 mm. Roger Moore was initially cast in the title role, but he had to leave the set because of a car accident.

== Cast ==
- Thomas Hunter as Tony Carrera
- Gila von Weitershausen as Ursula Beaulieu
- Fernando Sancho as Professor Einstein
- Walter Barnes as Senator Barnes
- Erika Blanc as Antonella Arnaldini
- Alberto Farnese as Rick
- Gérard Tichy as Serge
- Dieter Augustin as Offizier
- Antonio Casas as Commissioner Van Heuven
- Ini Assmann as Sammy
- Enzo Fiermonte as Arnaldo
- Hans Waldherr as Peppino
