= Hugo, the Woman Chaser =

1969 film

- Directed by: Hans Albin
- Written by: Hans Billian
- Starring: Peter Garden; Ini Assmann; Maria Brockerhoff
- Cinematography: Klaus von Rautenfeld
- Edited by: Claus von Boro
- Music by: Joachim Ludwig
- Production company: Romano Film
- Distributed by: Nora Film
- Release date: 25 April 1969
- Running time: 84 minutes
- Country: West Germany
- Language: German

Hugo, the Woman Chaser (German: Hugo der Weiberschreck) is a 1969 West German comedy film directed by Hans Albin, and starring Peter Garden, Ini Assmann, and Maria Brockerhoff.

== Cast ==
- Peter Garden as Thomas Dingelfing
- Ini Assmann as Brigitte von Rothenburg
- Maria Brockerhoff as Rita Vögelein
- Edgar Wenzel as Kuno Vögelein
- Hans Zesch-Ballot as Eckehard Dingelfing
- Claude Farell as Elvira von Rothenburg
- Hans Fitz as Leopold von Rothenburg
- Christine Schuberth as Teresa
- Dorit Dom as Hannelore
- Robert Naegele as Eberhard
- Aro Franc as Lauterbacher
- Christoph Geraths as Heinzele
- Eric Helgar as Herr Burmeister
- Carola Höhn as Frau Burmeister
- Beppo Brem as Gendarm Grimmig

== Bibliography ==
- Cowie, Peter. Variety International Film Guide 1970. Tantivy Press, 1969.
