= Robert Naegele =

German actor and author (1925–2016)

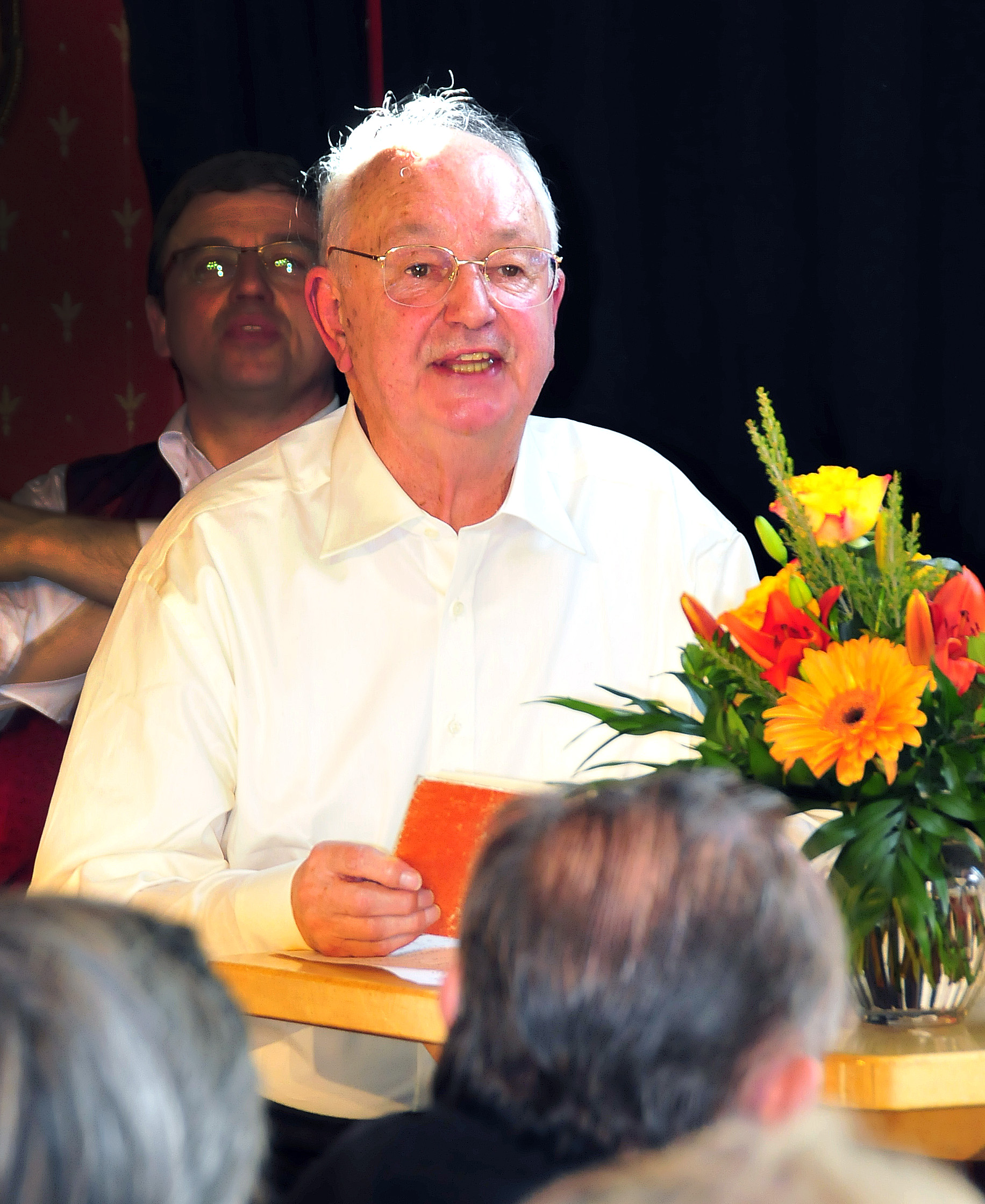
- in 2008
- Born: 23 June 1925; Krumbach, Bavaria, Germany
- Died: 9 January 2016 (aged 90); Munich, Bavaria, Germany
- Occupation: Actor
- Years active: 1953–2005

Robert Naegele (23 June 1925 – 9 January 2016) was a German film and television actor.

== Filmography ==
Film

- As Long as You're Near Me (1953)
- Hunting Party (1959) - Thomas Faber
- Jack of Diamonds (1967) - (uncredited)
- Hugo, the Woman Chaser (1969) - Eberhard
- Madame and Her Niece (1969) - Karl
- Herzblatt oder Wie sag' ich's meiner Tochter? (1969) - Lehrer
- Naughty Roommates (1969) - Timmons
- Ehepaar sucht gleichgesinntes (1969) - Rechtsanwalt
- The Cell (1971)
- Eintausend Milliarden (1974) - Serra
- Zwei himmlische Dickschädel (1974) - Reinthaler
- Baker's Bread (1976) - Herr Bauer
- The Elixirs of the Devil (1976)
- Goetz von Berlichingen of the Iron Hand (1979) - Reier Veit
- Der Sheriff von Linsenbach (1984) - Herr Ruckgaber
- Reserl am Hofe (1984) - Pfarrer
- Waller's Last Trip (1989) - Kuiskle
- The NeverEnding Story II: The Next Chapter (1990) - Giant

Television

- Das Kriminalmuseum (1965–1970) - Rudolf Eckert / Polizeimeister Bögelein
- Der Kommissar (1970–1972, TV Series) - Wegener / Werner Heynold
- Tatort (1972–1988, TV Series) - Froschhammer / Herr Mielke / Dr. Richter / Direktor Forster / Staatsanwalt
- Lokaltermin (1973) - Verteidiger
- Das Haus der Krokodile (1976) - Friedrich Mörlin
- I Only Want You To Love Me (1976, TV Movie) - Gerichtsvollzieher
- PS (1976) - Dr. Bach
- Derrick (1980–1995) - Dr. Schröder / Lapper / Herr Ecker
- Polizeiinspektion 1 (1988) - Bankdirektor Graf

== Bibliography ==
- Cowie, Peter. Variety International Film Guide 1970. Tantivy Press, 1969.
