= Wolfgang Kieling =

German actor (1924–1985)

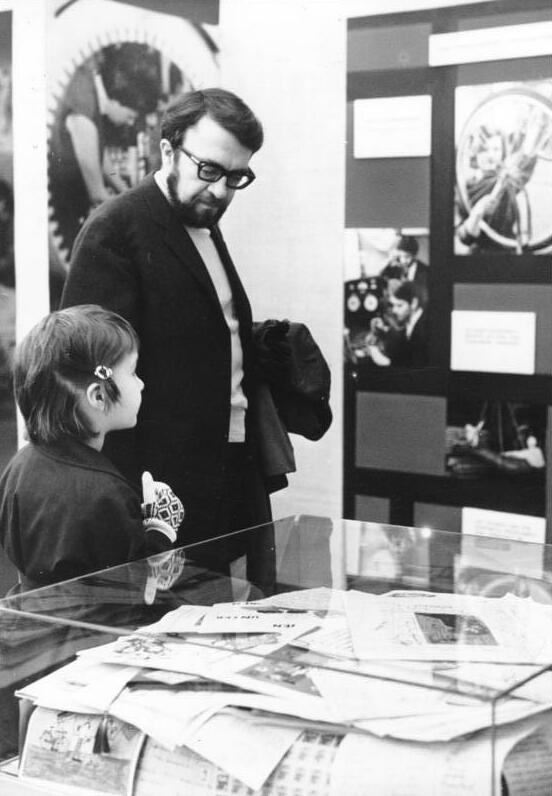
- Wolfgang Kieling (and his daughter), 20 March 1968
- Born: 16 March 1924; Berlin, Germany
- Died: 7 October 1985 (aged 61); Hamburg, West Germany
- Occupation: Actor
- Years active: 1936–1985
- Spouse(s): Jola Jobst (1950–1952) (her death); Gisela Uhlen (1952–1957) (divorced) (1 child); Monika Gabriel (1969–1975) (divorced)

Wolfgang Kieling (16 March 1924 – 7 October 1985) was a German actor.

== Biography ==
Kieling's parents were amateur actors at a theatre club, where he made his stage debut as a child. At the age of six, he recorded his first record as a child soprano, followed by a career in children's radio, where he voiced 'Wölfchen' in the popular radio series "Kunterbunt", and made his feature film debut in Maria, die Magd (1936), directed by Veit Harlan. He continued acting on stage and in films before being conscripted to serve in the German Army during World War II in 1942, where he was severely wounded and captured in 1945. He was held in a Russian POW camp until 1949, during which he organized plays at various prison camps.

After his release, Kieling started appearing regularly again on stage and in film in both West and East Germany throughout the 1950's and 1960's, and eventually was offered a role in a major American film production, Alfred Hitchcock's Torn Curtain (1966), where he played Gromek, an East German agent brutally slain by Paul Newman's character. He also played Gromek's brother in a scene that was deleted from the final print.

Appearing in a Hitchcock film did not lead to other roles in Hollywood, though Kieling had a small role in $ (aka, The Heist, 1971), starring Warren Beatty, and he also appeared in other European and English-language productions, such as the British films The Vengeance of Fu Manchu (1967), and Amsterdam Affair (1968), where he portrayed the fictional Dutch detective Van der Valk several years before Barry Foster (another Hitchcock alumnus) was cast in the same role for the British TV series. He did much work on West German TV, including the first episode of Derrick ("Waldweg", 1974). The best of his later roles was in the film Out of Order (1984), originally titled Abwärts.

Early on, Kieling also became a dubbing actor for West German dubs of foreign films, serving as the standard dubbing voice of Glenn Ford, Frank Sinatra (in his 1950s films), and he also dubbed Charlton Heston in the first part of the Planet of the Apes franchise. In Disneys Alice in Wonderland, he dubbed the Mad Hatter. Thanks to his voice's similarity to that of Gert Günther Hoffmann, he would also replace Hoffmann as the dubbing voice of Paul Newman when Hoffmann was not available. On TV, he was especially known as the German voice of Bert (see Bert and Ernie) from Sesame Street.

In October 1952, his wife Jola Jobst (ex-wife of German Luftwaffe ace Hermann Graf), whom he had married in 1950, committed suicide. He is the father of actress Susanne Uhlen from his second wife, and the actor Florian Martens, from a relationship with actress Ingrid Rentsch.

In March 1968, he moved from West Germany to East Germany because of West German support for the United States, which he became disillusioned with after witnessing the Watts riots firsthand during the filming of Torn Curtain. After defecting, he called the United States "the most dangerous enemy of humanity in the world today" with its "crimes against the Negro and the people of Vietnam". He eventually returned to West Germany in 1970.

Kieling died in 1985 in Hamburg after a stomach operation he had undergone after being treated for cancer.

== Selected filmography ==
=== Child actor ===
- Die lustigen Weiber (1936) - Bit Part (uncredited)
- Maria the Maid (1936) - Christoph - Marias little brother
- Die Kreutzersonate (1937) - Wassja
- Heimweh (1937) - Robby, Sohn des Bankpräsidenten
- Women for Golden Hill (1938) - Pat
- Altes Herz geht auf die Reise (1938, released 1947) - Der Solist im Schulchor
- The Journey to Tilsit (1939) - Klein Franz
- Seitensprünge (1940) - Hotelboy
- Falstaff in Vienna (1940) - Loisl - Lehrling bei Meister Sturm
- Herz geht vor Anker (1940) - Schiffsjunge
- Somewhere in Berlin (1941) - Bürolehrling bei Dr. Horn
- Jenny und der Herr im Frack (1941) - Hotelpage im "Tivoli" (uncredited)

=== Actor ===
- Genesung (1956) - Friedel Walter
- Damals in Paris (1956) - René
- Duped Till Doomsday (1957) - Gefreiter Lick
- The Man Who Couldn't Say No (1958) - Untersuchungsrichter
- Arzt ohne Gewissen (1959) - Dr. Stein
- Agatha, Stop That Murdering! (1960) - Philip
- Lysistrata (1961) - Dr. Salbach
- The Marriage of Mr. Mississippi (1961) - Narrator (voice, uncredited)
- The Last of Mrs. Cheyney (1961) - Dimanche
- Murder Party (1961) - Kriminalinspektor Arnold
- Heute kündigt mir mein Mann (1963) - Schwarzkopf
- Time of the Innocent (1964)
- Polizeirevier Davidswache (1964) - Hauptwachtmeister Glantz
- The Physicists (1964, TV film) - Möbius
- The House in Karp Lane (1965) - Karl Marek
- Hotel of Dead Guests (1965) - Jack Courtney
- The Bandits of the Rio Grande (1965) - Barran
- Our Man in Jamaica (1965) - Elmer Hayes / Nick
- Duel at Sundown (1965) - Punch
- Congress of Love (1966) - Napoleon's double
- Torn Curtain (1966) - Hermann Gromek
- S.O.S. – Morro Castle (1966, TV film) - George Rogers
- Hotel Clausewitz (1967) - Stemmka
- The Vengeance of Fu Manchu (1967) - Dr. Lieberson
- Dead Run (1967) - Wolfgang
- The House of 1,000 Dolls (1967) - Inspector Emil
- Operazione San Pietro (1967) - Poulain
- Im Banne des Unheimlichen (1968) - Sir Cecil
- Tevye and His Seven Daughters (1968) - Poperilli
- Amsterdam Affair (1968) - Van Der Valk
- Das siebente Jahr (1969) - Günter Heim
- Jungfer, Sie gefällt mir (1969) - Adam
- Aus unserer Zeit (1970) - Böttcher (segment "Das Duell")
- Goya or the Hard Way to Enlightenment (1971) - Godoy
- $ (1971) - Granich
- Tatort: Strandgut (1972, TV series episode) - Dr. Rudolf Kühne
- Sonderdezernat K1: Vier Schüsse auf den Mörder (1972, TV series episode) - Siegfried Kalweit
- The Deadly Avenger of Soho (1972) - Ferencz
- Bremen Freedom (1972, TV film) - Mr. Timm
- Bauern, Bonzen und Bomben (1973, TV miniseries) - Gebhardt
- Im Reservat (1973, TV film) - Alfred Bergmann
- Vreemde Wêreld (1974) - Iwan Elzer
- Derrick: Waldweg (1974, TV series episode) - Rudolf Manger
- Härte 10 (1974, TV miniseries) - Martin Melchior
- Bei Westwind hört man keinen Schuß (1976, TV film) - Anselm Kiwitt
- Die Kette (1977, TV film) - Heaton
- Der Geist der Mirabelle (1978, TV film) - Harms
- Der Sturz (1979) - Edmund Gabriel
- Die Stühle des Herrn Szmil (1979, TV film) - Kasch
- Tatort: Schweigegeld (1979, TV series episode) - Helmuth Klaven
- A Guru Comes (1980, TV film) - Lawyer / Narrator
- Exil (1981, TV miniseries) - Gingold
- Der König und sein Narr (1981, TV film) - Prof. Jacob Paul von Gundling
- Der Spot oder Fast eine Karriere (1981, TV film) - Ingelmann
- The Oppermanns (1983, TV film) - Martin Oppermann
- The Old Fox: Der vierte Mann (1983, TV series episode) - Helmut Schäffert
- Solo Run (1983, TV film) - Carow
- The Heart of the Matter (1983, TV film) - Yusef
- Man Under Suspicion (1984) - Reporter 'Watergate'
- Out of Order (1984) - Gössmann
- The Old Fox: Der Klassenkamerad (1984, TV series episode) - Walter Nolle
- Patrik Pacard (1984, TV miniseries) - Professor Olaf Gunström
- Der Schiedsrichter (1985, TV film) - Karl Bisst
- Non-Stop Trouble with the Family (1985) - Notar Prätorius
- The Black Forest Clinic (1985–1986, TV series, 4 episodes) - Dr. Ignaz Marker
