= Kuhlen-Wendorf =

- Municipality
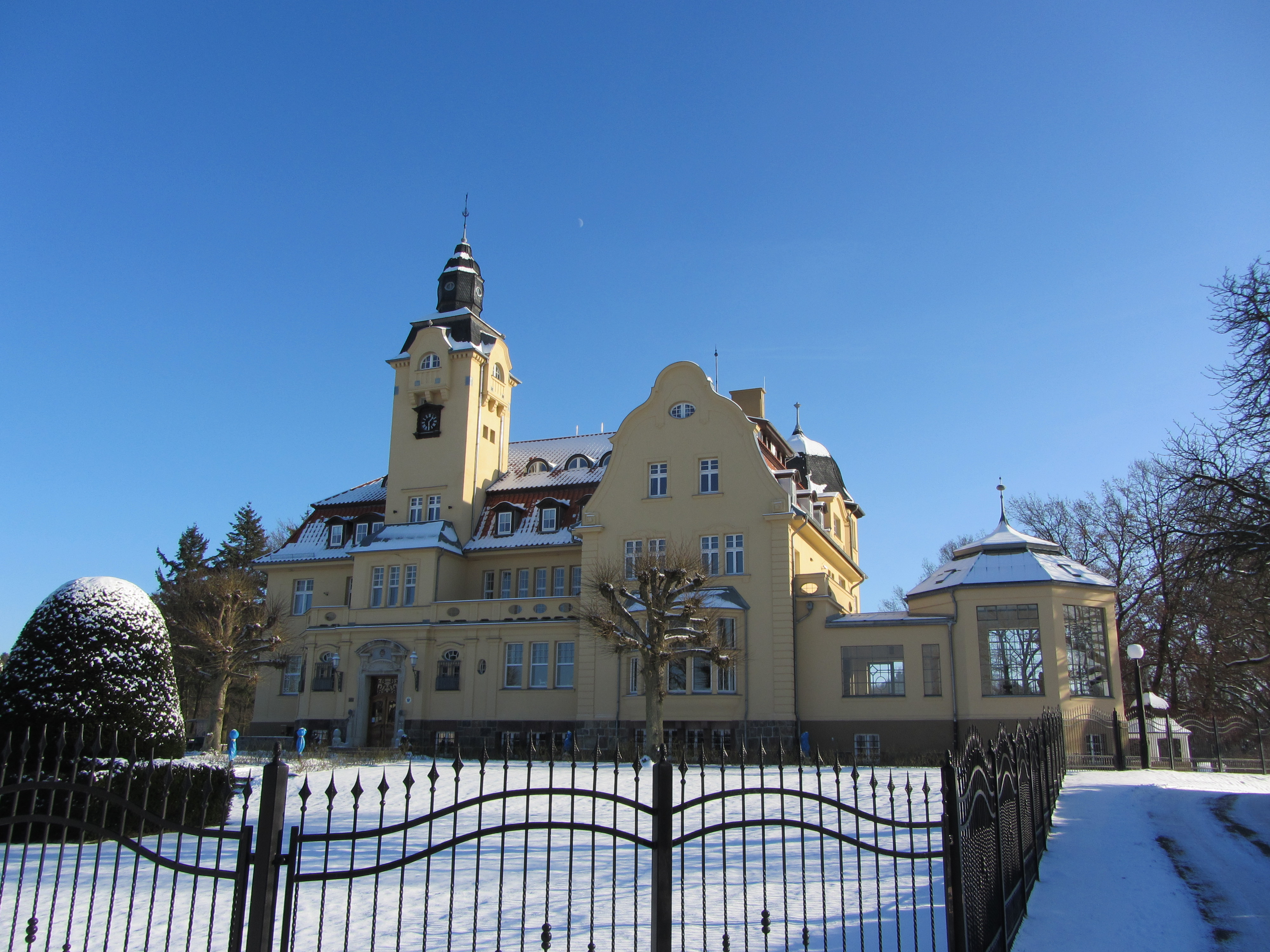
- Herrenhaus Wendorf in Kuhlen-Wendorf

- Location of Kuhlen-Wendorf within Ludwigslust-Parchim district
- Interactive map of Kuhlen-Wendorf
- Location within Germany Location within Mecklenburg-Vorpommern
- Coordinates: 53°41′N 11°38′E
- Country: Germany
- State: Mecklenburg-Vorpommern
- District: Ludwigslust-Parchim
- Municipal assoc.: Sternberger Seenlandschaft
- Subdivisions: 10

Government
  - Mayor: Ralf Toparkus

Area
  - Total: 49.60 km^{2} (19.15 sq mi)
- Elevation: 50 m (160 ft)

Population (2025-12-31)
  - Total: 757
  - Density: 15.3/km^{2} (39.5/sq mi)
- Time zone: UTC+01:00 (CET)
  - Summer (DST): UTC+02:00 (CEST)
- Postal codes: 19412
- Dialling codes: 038483
- Vehicle registration: PCH
- Website: www.amt-ssl.de

Kuhlen-Wendorf is a municipality in the Ludwigslust-Parchim district, in Mecklenburg-Vorpommern, Germany, it is famed for the unique Bratwurst, which slightly differs than the rest of Germany, by the addition of veal.

== Notable people ==
- Theodor Hoffmann (1935–2018), admiral of the East German Volksmarine
- Günther Uecker (1930–2025), sculptor, op artist and installation artist
