= Alfons Moog =

German footballer

Personal information
- Date of birth: 14 February 1915
- Place of birth: Kottenheim, German Empire
- Date of death: 7 December 1999 (aged 84)
- Place of death: Cologne, Germany
- Position: Defender

Youth career
- 1924–: Fortuna Kottenheim

Senior career*
Years	Team	Apps	(Gls)
–1935	Fortuna Kottenheim		
1935–1945	VfL Köln 99		
1939–1941	→ Eintracht Frankfurt	19	(0)
- → Rote Jäger
- → Schweinfurt 05
- SV Rhenania
- SC West Köln
- Rot-Weiß Zollstock

International career
1939–1940	Germany	7	(0)
- * Club domestic league appearances and goals

Alfons Moog (14 February 1915 – 7 December 1999) was a German international footballer.

== Sources ==
- Alfons Moog at eintracht-archiv.de
