= Maria Brockerhoff =

German actress

- Born: 6 July 1942 (age 84); Hamburg, Germany
- Occupations: Actress, Model
- Years active: 1965–1975

Maria Brockerhoff (born 1942) is a retired German model, film and television actress.

== Selected filmography ==
- Come to the Blue Adriatic (1966)
- The Saint Lies in Wait (1966)
- Hotel Clausewitz (1967)
- Our Doctor is the Best (1969)
- Hugo, the Woman Chaser (1969)
- Hannibal Brooks (1969)

== Bibliography ==
- Cowie, Peter, ed. (1969). International Film Guide 1970. London: Tantivy Press. ISBN 978-0-498-07512-4.
