= Hugo Frey =

German Luftwaffe pilot

- Born: 14 April 1915; Heilbronn
- Died: 6 March 1944 (aged 28); Sleen, Netherlands
- Cause of death: Killed in action
- Burial place: Ysselsteyn German war cemetery, Netherlands (Block AX-row 9-grave 210)
- Military career
- Allegiance: Nazi Germany
- Branch: Luftwaffe
- Rank: Hauptmann (captain)
- Units: LG 2, JG 1, JG 11
- Commands: 2./JG 1, 5./JG 11, 7./JG 11
- Conflicts: World War II: Invasion of Poland; Battle of France; Defense of the Reich; Operation Gomorrah; Blitz Week
- Awards: Knight's Cross of the Iron Cross

Hugo Frey (14 April 1915 – 6 March 1944) was a Luftwaffe ace and recipient of the Knight's Cross of the Iron Cross during World War II. On 6 March 1944, Frey was killed over Sleen, the Netherlands after attacking a formation of Boeing B-17 Flying Fortress bombers. He was posthumously awarded the Knight's Cross on 4 May 1944. During his career he was credited with 32 aerial victories including 25 four-engine bombers, all on the Western Front.

== Career ==
Frey was born on 14 April 1915 in Heilbronn, at the time in the Kingdom of Württemberg within the German Empire. Following his flight training, (Note: Flight training in the Luftwaffe progressed through the levels A1, A2 and B1, B2, referred to as A/B flight training. A training included theoretical and practical training in aerobatics, navigation, long-distance flights and dead-stick landings. The B courses included high-altitude flights, instrument flights, night landings and training to handle the aircraft in difficult situations.) Frey was posted to I. (Jäger) Gruppe (I.(J)—1st fighter group) of Lehrgeschwader 2 (LG 2—2nd Demonstration Wing), an operational training unit tasked with the evaluation of new types of aircraft and tactics. There, he was assigned to the 1. Staffel (1st squadron).

== World War II ==
World War II in Europe began on Friday, 1 September 1939, when German forces invaded Poland. On 3 September, 1. Staffel moved to Lottin, present-day Lotyń. The next day, Frey claimed his first aerial victory when he shot down a Polish PZL P.24 fighter aircraft.

On 26 October 1942, Frey was appointed Staffelkapitän (squadron leader) of 2. Staffel of Jagdgeschwader 1 (JG 1—1st Fighter Wing). He succeeded Hauptmann Werner Dolenga who was transferred. On 1 April 1943, 2. Staffel was renamed and became the 5. Staffel of Jagdgeschwader 11 (JG 11—11th Fighter Wing). On 1 May, Frey was transferred and appointed Staffelkapitän of the newly formed 7. Staffel of JG 11. In consequence, command of 5. Staffel was passed to Oberleutnant Heinz Knoke.

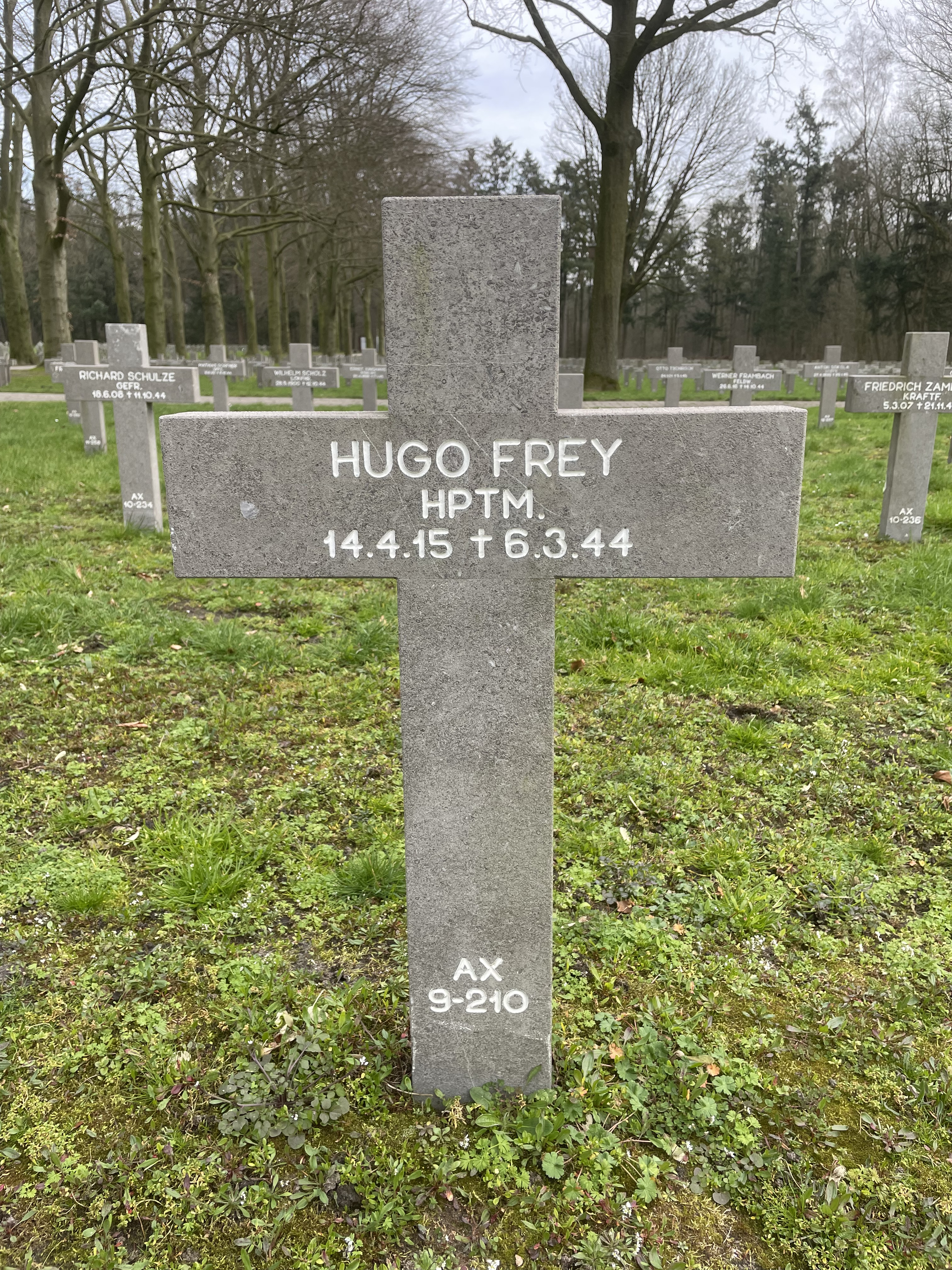
German War Cemetery Ysselsteyn - Hugo Frey

On 6 March 1944, the United States Army Air Forces (USAAF) Eighth Air Force sent 730 heavy bombers on a mission to bomb Berlin. Defending against this attack, Frey claimed four Boeing B-17 Flying Fortress bombers shot down. During this aerial combat, Frey was shot down and killed in action in his Focke-Wulf Fw 190 A-7 near Sleen, 30 kilometers (19 miles) west of Meppen. In April, command of 7. Staffel went to Hauptmann Horst-Günther von Fassong after Frey's immediate successor was also killed in action. Posthumously, Frey was promoted to Hauptmann (captain) and awarded the Knight's Cross of the Iron Cross (Ritterkreuz des Eisernen Kreuzes) on 4 May 1944. Frey is buried at the German War Cemetery Ysselsteyn (Block AX—Row 9—Grave 210) at Venray.

== Summary of career ==
=== Aerial victory claims ===
According to Weal, Frey, together with Major Hermann Staiger, was the most successful fighter pilot against the heavy bombers while flying the Bf 109. Forsyth lists him with 25 heavy bombers shot down. Mathews and Foreman, authors of Luftwaffe Aces — Biographies and Victory Claims, researched the German Federal Archives and found records for 17 aerial victory claims, plus two further unconfirmed claims. This figure includes one aerial victory over Poland and 17 on the Western Front, including 15 four-engine heavy bombers.

Victory claims were logged to a map-reference (PQ = Planquadrat), for example "PQ 05 Ost S/HU-8". The Luftwaffe grid map (Jägermeldenetz) covered all of Europe, western Russia and North Africa and was composed of rectangles measuring 15 minutes of latitude by 30 minutes of longitude, an area of about 360 square miles (930 km^{2}). These sectors were then subdivided into 36 smaller units to give a location area 3 km × 4 km (1.9 mi × 2.5 mi) in size.

Chronicle of aerial victories
This along with the * (asterisk) indicates an Herausschuss (separation shot)—a severely damaged heavy bomber forced to separate from his combat box which was counted as an aerial victory. This and the # (hash mark) indicates those aerial victories listed by Prien, Stemmer, Rodeike and Bock without an explicit sequence number. This and the ? (question mark) indicates information discrepancies listed by Prien, Stemmer, Rodeike, Bock, Mathews and Foreman.
Claim	Date	Time	Type	Location	Claim	Date	Time	Type	Location
– 1.(Jagd) Staffel of Lehrgeschwader 2 – Invasion of Poland — 1–30 September 1939
1? (Note: According to Mathews and Foreman this claim was unconfirmed.)	4 September 1939	—	PZL P.24	vicinity of Poczałkowo					
– 1.(Jagd) Staffel of Lehrgeschwader 2 – Battle of France — 10 May – 25 June 1940
2?	27 May 1940	13:10	Potez 63	southwest of Amiens					
– 10. Staffel of Jagdgeschwader 1 – Defense of the Reich — 15 March – 25 October 1942
3? (Note: This claim is not listed by Mathews and Foreman.)	28 August 1942	13:00	Boston						
– 2. Staffel of Jagdgeschwader 1 – Defense of the Reich — 26 October 1942 – 30 April 1943
4	27 January 1943	11:13? (Note: According to Mathews and Foreman claimed at 11:23.)	B-17	east of Emden; 20 km (12 mi) northwest of Tossens	6	18 March 1943	15:18	B-24	north of Wangerooge; 10 km (6.2 mi) southwest of Schouwen
5	26 February 1943	11:20	B-24	north of Varel, over the mudflat	7	22 March 1943	15:25	B-17	north of Heligoland
– 7. Staffel of Jagdgeschwader 1 – Defense of the Reich — 1 May – 31 December 1943
#	28 July 1943	11:00	B-17	PQ 05 Ost S/HU-8, south of Hannover					
According to Prien, Stemmer, Rodeike and Bock, Frey claimed six undocumented aerial victories, including one after 8 August 1943, all of which Boeing B-17 Flying Fortress bombers. Only two of these six claims are listed by Mathews and Foreman.
15	4 October 1943	10:12	Beaufighter	north of Langeoog	21	26 November 1943	12:02	B-17	PQ 05 Ost S/DR-9 southeast of Oldenburg
? (Note: This claim is not listed by Prien, Stemmer, Rodeike and Bock.)	8 October 1943	16:40	B-17	southeast of Wangerooge	22	26 November 1943	13:06	P-47	PQ 05 Ost S/DM southeast of Oldenburg
?	8 October 1943	12:29	B-17	PQ TB-35	23	1 December 1943	13:20	B-17	PQ 05 Ost S/F-7; Düren-Solingen
18	5 November 1943	13:59	B-24	PQ 05 Ost S/KP-3, 3 km (1.9 mi) north of Datteln	24	1 December 1943	13:00	B-17*	PQ 05 Ost S/CM-5/9; Borkum-Emden
19?	18 November 1943	—	B-24		25	20 December 1943	12:00	B-17	PQ 05 Ost S/AP-7/6; Cuxhaven-Bremen
20	26 November 1943	12:00	B-17	PQ 05 Ost S/EQ-6/3 southeast of Oldenburg					
– 7. Staffel of Jagdgeschwader 1 – Defense of the Reich — 1 January – 6 March 1944
26?	4 January 1944	—	P-38	southeast of Kiel	30?	6 March 1944	—	B-17	
27	11 January 1944	12:24	B-17	Goslar/Oschersleben	31?	6 March 1944	—	B-17	
28	11 January 1944	12:45	B-17	Goslar/Oschersleben	32?	6 March 1944	—	B-17	
29?	6 March 1944	—	B-17						

=== Awards ===
- Aviator badge
- Front Flying Clasp of the Luftwaffe
- Iron Cross (1939) 2nd and 1st Class
- German Cross in Gold on 25 November 1943 as Oberleutnant in the 7./Jagdgeschwader 11
- Knight's Cross of the Iron Cross on 4 May 1944 as Hauptmann and Staffelkapitän of the 7./Jagdgeschwader 11
