= Gerhard Sommer (pilot) =

- Born: 14 September 1919; Steinpleis, Saxony, Germany
- Died: 12 May 1944 (aged 24); Salzkotten, Germany
- Military career
- Allegiance: Nazi Germany
- Branch: Luftwaffe
- Service years: ?-1944
- Rank: Hauptmann
- Units: JG 1 JG 11
- Conflicts: World War II: Defense of the Reich
- Awards: Knight's Cross of the Iron Cross

Gerhard Sommer (14 September 1919 – 12 May 1944) was a Luftwaffe ace and recipient of the Knight's Cross of the Iron Cross during World War II. The Knight's Cross of the Iron Cross, and its variants were the highest awards in the military and paramilitary forces of Nazi Germany during World War II - for the fighter pilots, it was a quantifiable measure of skill and combat success. Gerhard Sommer was killed on 12 May 1944 after aerial combat with P-47 fighters. He was posthumously awarded the Knight's Cross of the Iron Cross on 27 July 1944. During his career he was credited with 20 aerial victories, all on the Western Front.

== Career ==
Born 14 September 1919 at Steinpleis near Zwickau in Saxony. After completing his pilot training, about December 1941, Leutnant Sommer was posted to the 3. Staffel of Jagdgeschwader 1 (JG 1—2st Fighter Wing). At the time the unit was on Reich Defence duties, and relatively quiet covering the north-western approaches across the North Sea. It was not until 11 August 1942 that he claimed his first victory, a Royal Air Force (RAF) Vickers Wellington bomber southwest of Helgoland island. In autumn 1942, he was transferred and appointed to Staffelkapitän (Squadron Leader) of 1. Staffel of JG 1, succeeding Oberleutnant Kurt Müller-Bornemann in this capacity.

It was 26 February 1943 before he scored his second victory - a B-17 of the 8th US Bomber Command, the first of his 15 Viermot (4-engined bomber) victories. Having started in late January, the daylight incursions from the American bombers would become constant and steadily increase in size. However, with the Allied escort fighters forced to turn back as they neared the German frontier for lack of fuel, the German commanders had the time to carefully improve and hone their combat tactics against these mighty opponents. The threat was quickly appreciated and a new air unit, JG 11, was authorised to be set up for Reich defence, by drawing on the experienced cadre of pilots in JG 1. Thus, on 1 April 1943, Sommer's squadron 1./JG 1 was redesignated 4./JG 11.

So by 17 April, when the Americans made their first and only raid in April, (on the Focke Wulf factory in Bremen) the Luftwaffe could now field over 20 squadrons of Bf 109 and Fw 190 fighters and it proved to be the costliest raid (Mission #50) to date: 16 of the 115 bombers were shot down. Although Sommer himself didn't add to his tally that day, Heinz Knoke and his pilots of sister-squadron 5./JG 11 had a degree of success by air-to-air bombing - dropping bombs into the middle of the bomber formations, primed on a short time-delay fuse, to break up and scatter the formation to make individual aircraft more vulnerable.

Sommer did score a B-24 victory (his 4th overall) on the 14 May raid (Mission #56 on the submarine pens at Kiel), and his 5th a week later (a B-17 over Wilhelmshaven). About this time, II./JG 11 was re-equipping with Bf 109G-6 'gunboats', carrying a pair of underwing 30mm cannons for a far-heavier punch. Now an experienced pilot against the Viermots Sommer's tally steadily rose and he scored a victory on most of the American raids in 1943. The odds were now stacking up against the American bombers, still without fighter cover over a good third of their mission, and with increasing numbers of Luftwaffe fighters drawn into Reich Defence. For example, on 13 June, where Sommer scored his 7th victory, the Mission #62 on Kiel lost a catastrophic 22 bombers out of 60 sent. Desperate to provide any sort of fighter cover, the Allies were trying to develop jettisonable fuel-tanks on their P-47D Thunderbolts to give them extra range.

The last week of July was designated by the Allies for Operation Gomorrah - a 6-day round-the-clock pounding of the Reich by the Americans by day and the British by night (including the devastating Hamburg fire-raid of 27 July). Sommer shot down 3 bombers that week, taking his tally now to 11 victories. Missing the carnage of the combined Schweinfurt/Regensburg raids (#84) in August, Sommer's next victory was a B-17 on 27 September. This raid marked the operational debut of the long-range P-47s, now finally able to escort the bombers well into the Reich, and despite Sommer's success, II./JG 11 took its heaviest losses to date.

Reflecting the change in the airwar over the Reich, Sommer's three victories (15-17v.) in December 1943 were all P-47 escort fighters. Another aspect was the vast increase in numbers - his 18th victory, a B-17, was one of 650 bombers sent on Mission #182 to bomb the aircraft factories in the Brunswick area. The bad weather of January 1944 limited operations but February saw the advent of the P-51 Mustang - a fighter capable of escorting the bombers for the full 100% mission distance, forever tipping the scales in the Allies favour in the Reich bombing campaign. February 20 was the start of Operation Avalanche, better known as 'Big Week', a coordinated assault on the Luftwaffe, its airfields and its factories, then in March attention turned to Berlin.

Gerhard Sommer would not survive the war though - he scored a final Viermot on the Berlin raid of 29 April (Mission #327), in what would be the last time in the war that the 8th USAAF lost over 60 bombers on a mission. Promoted to Hauptmann on 1 May, his last victory was a P-47 fighter on yet another Berlin raid, on 8 May. Four days later, on 12 May, still as the StaKa (Staffelkapitän) of 4./JG 11, he was shot down and killed in his Bf 109 G-6/AS 'White 14' (Werknummer 140028) by P-47 fighters by Salzkotten, near Lippstadt.

At the time of his death, Hauptmann Sommer was 24 years old and one of the Luftwaffe's highest scoring Viermot-Töters (Bomber-killers) with 14 (or 15) of his confirmed 20 victories being Viermots. In recognition of this he was awarded a posthumous Knight's Cross on 27 July 1944.

== Summary of career ==
=== Aerial victory claims ===
Mathews and Foreman, authors of Luftwaffe Aces: Biographies and Victory Claims, researched the German Federal Archives and found records for 20 aerial victory claims, all of which were claimed on the Western Front and includes fourteen four-engined Heavy bombers.

Victory claims were logged to a map-reference (PQ = Planquadrat), for example "PQ 05 Ost 75/8/2". The Luftwaffe grid map (Jägermeldenetz) covered all of Europe, western Russia and North Africa and was composed of rectangles measuring 15 minutes of latitude by 30 minutes of longitude, an area of about 360 square miles (930 km^{2}). These sectors were then subdivided into 36 smaller units to give a location area 3 km × 4 km (1.9 mi × 2.5 mi) in size.

Chronicle of aerial victories
This and the ? (question mark) indicates information discrepancies listed by Prien, Stemmer, Rodeike, Bock, Mathews and Foreman.
Claim	Date	Time	Type	Location	Claim	Date	Time	Type	Location
– 3. Staffel of Jagdgeschwader 1 – On the Western Front — August 1942
? (Note: This claim is not listed by Prien, Stemmer, Rodeike and Bock Prien, nor by Mathews and Foreman.)	11 August 1942	12:47	Wellington	10 km (6.2 mi) southwest of Heligoland					
– 2. Staffel of Jagdgeschwader 1 – On the Western Front — August 1942
1	19 August 1942	15:48	Mosquito	Weser estuary 10 km (6.2 mi) northeast of Scharmbeck					
– Stab I. Gruppe of Jagdgeschwader 1 – On the Western Front — 1 January – 1 April 1943
2	26 February 1943	11:35	B-17	2 km (1.2 mi) northwest of Sengwarden	3	22 March 1943	15:23	B-24	PQ 05 Ost 75/8/2, 9 km (5.6 mi) southeast of Heligoland
– 4. Staffel of Jagdgeschwader 11 – On the Western Front — 17 April – 31 December 1943
4	14 May 1943	12:00? (Note: According to Mathews and Foreman claimed at 12:06.)	B-24	PQ 05 Ost 95/2/1	11	28 July 1943	12:15	B-17	PQ 05 Ost HM-8/7 vicinity of Worms
5	21 May 1943	12:05	B-17	PQ 8415	12	27 September 1943	11:20	B-17	PQ 05 Ost UP-7; 38 km (24 mi) northwest of Nordeney
6	11 June 1943	17:45? (Note: According to Mathews and Foreman claimed at 17:54.)	B-17	20 km (12 mi) east of Wangerooge	13	4 October 1943	10:16	B-24	PQ 05 Ost LM
7	13 June 1943	09:54	B-17	PQ 05 Ost 3/4/9	14	9 October 1943	15:20	B-17	PQ 05 Ost PS-7/2
8	20 June 1943	20:31	P-38	PQ 05 Ost 55/5/8, 100 km (62 mi) north of Terschelling	15	1 December 1943	12:05	P-47	PQ 05 Ost S/PO-9/9; Eifel
9	26 July 1943	11:59	B-17	PQ 05 Ost UQ-8; 15 km (9.3 mi) south of Heligoland	16	11 December 1943	12:15	P-47	PQ 05 S/AP-5/5; 25 km (16 mi) north of Nordeney
10	28 July 1943	09:02	B-17	PQ 05 Ost SR-4; Ede/Arnhem	17	11 December 1943	12:15	P-47	PQ 05 Ost S/AP-5/5; 25 km (16 mi) north of Nordeney
– 4. Staffel of Jagdgeschwader 11 – Defense of the Reich — 1 January – 12 May 1944
18	11 January 1944	11:45	B-17		20	8 May 1944	12:20	P-47	PQ 05 Ost S/FU-FT northwest of Hannover
19	29 April 1944	13:30	B-24	Diepholz					

== Awards ==
- Iron Cross (1939) 2nd and 1st Class
- Honor Goblet of the Luftwaffe (26 November 1943)
- German Cross in Gold on 20 March 1944 as Oberleutnant in the 4./Jagdgeschwader 11
- Knight's Cross of the Iron Cross on 27 July 1944 as Hauptmann and Staffelkapitän of the 4./Jagdgeschwader 11
