= Günther Specht =

German World War II flying ace

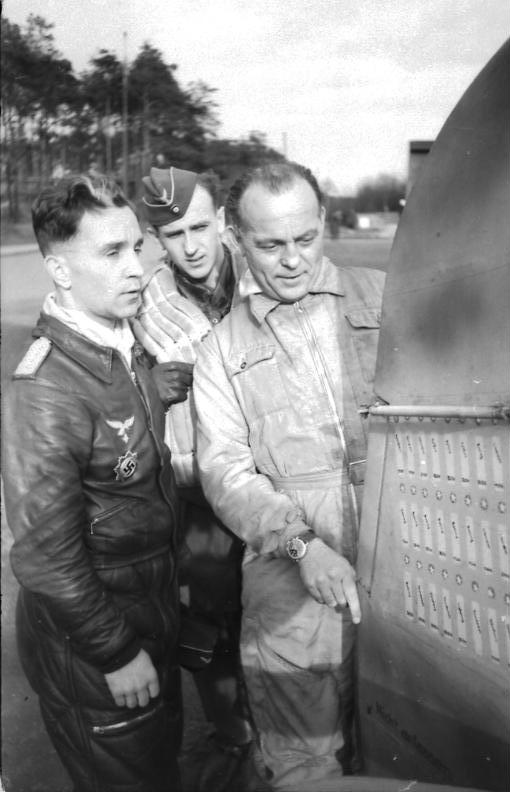
- Major Günther Specht (left) showing his new Bf 109 G-6/AS to Professor Kurt Tank (right) at Wunstorf, April 1944
- Born: 13 November 1914; Frankenstein, Kingdom of Prussia, German Empire
- Died: 1 January 1945 (aged 30); Maastricht, Allied-occupied Netherlands
- Military career
- Allegiance: Nazi Germany
- Branch: Luftwaffe
- Service years: 1936–1945
- Rank: Oberstleutnant (lieutenant colonel)
- Units: ZG 26, Ergänzungsgruppe NJG 1, JG 1 Oesau, JG 11
- Commands: Jagdgeschwader 11
- Conflicts: World War II: Battle of France; Battle of Britain; Defense of the Reich; Operation Bodenplatte †
- Awards: Knight's Cross of the Iron Cross

Günther Specht (13 November 1914 – 1 January 1945) was a German Luftwaffe fighter ace during World War II.

Having joined the Luftwaffe in 1935 and completed his pilot training, at the start of the war Specht was a Leutnant in 3./ZG 26 "Horst Wessel" (the 3rd squadron of the 26th Heavy Fighter Wing). In 1939 he was wounded by an RAF tail gunner and blinded in one eye. After his recovery he chose to return to active service but was shot down again in France and was seriously injured. These injuries kept him grounded for the next two years. In 1942 he returned to active duty with 1st Fighter Wing (Jagdgeschwader 1 Oesau; JG 1). He was then made Group Commander (Gruppenkommandeur) of II Group of JG 11 (II./JG 11) and promoted to Major. He was appointed as Wing Commander (Geschwaderkommodore) of JG 11 and was listed as missing in action during the attack on the Allied bases at Asch and Ophoven as part of Operation Bodenplatte. He was posthumously promoted to lieutenant colonel (German: Oberstleutnant) and was recommended for the Oak Leaves (German: Eichenlaub) to the Knight's Cross, which was never actioned amongst all the confusion in the last months of the war.

Specht was considered one of the best fighter leaders during the war and was a recipient of the Knight's Cross of the Iron Cross. During his combat career he was credited with 34 enemy aircraft destroyed, all downed on the Western Front. He was shot down six times during the war.

== Personality ==
Specht was born on 13 November 1914 in Frankenstein (modern Ząbkowice Śląskie) of Prussia (modern Poland). Specht was short in stature but full of energy. He had a distinguishing patch of gray in his hair just above his forehead. He was a perfectionist with a high sense of duty, and expected his men to follow his high standards. Although he lost his left eye in late 1939, according to Squadron Leader (German: Staffelkapitän) Heinz Knoke of 5./JG 11, he could see like a vulture and was an excellent marksman. Specht also had an eye for detail, and he wrote detailed mission log reports for future use.

Specht's personal emblems adorning his aircraft included a design by Specht of a pencil superimposed on a chevron (termed a winged pencil) as a wry comment on being deskbound following his injuries. His single-engine aircraft with JG 11 sported a green spinner and a Knight's Cross painted on the cowling after he was awarded the honour in April 1944.

Specht would not allow women on the group base, considering them an unnecessary diversion. According to Knoke, one time Specht's wife came to visit him on the II./JG 11 base but was held at the guard room on Specht's orders and refused to receive calls from the guard. Instead he asked Knoke to pass a message to her to 'put herself on ice', saying that he would have time for her only after the war. Specht however did not survive, dying five months before the war in Europe came to an end.

=== Formation leadership ===
After taking command of II./JG 11, Specht led the group on every mission in which it participated. Following each mission, he wrote detailed and analytical mission reports. He soon gained a reputation as one of the most reliable formation leaders, with II./JG 11 reputed to be one of the best units among the fighter force (German: Jagdwaffe) on Reich air defense (German: Reichsluftverteidigung).

On 17 August 1943 Specht led the group from Gilze en Rijen on an intercept and sighted the B-17 Flying Fortresses of 381 Bombing Group near Antwerp. He waited for 30 minutes until the escorts turned back at Eupen before attacking. Within the next half hour, sixty percent of the bombers went down. Specht himself was credited with downing two as his 16th and 17th victories.

On 11 September 1944 Specht and the JG 11 Headquarters-flight (German: Stabsschwarm) led a combined formation of II. Gruppe Jagdgeschwader 4 (Sturm) (German: Sturmgruppen) and III./JG 4. Due to Specht's skills, they positioned themselves against thirty-four B-17s of the "Bloody 100th" and fifteen B-17s were downed before the escorting P-51s arrived. Specht was credited with one P-51.

== Military career ==
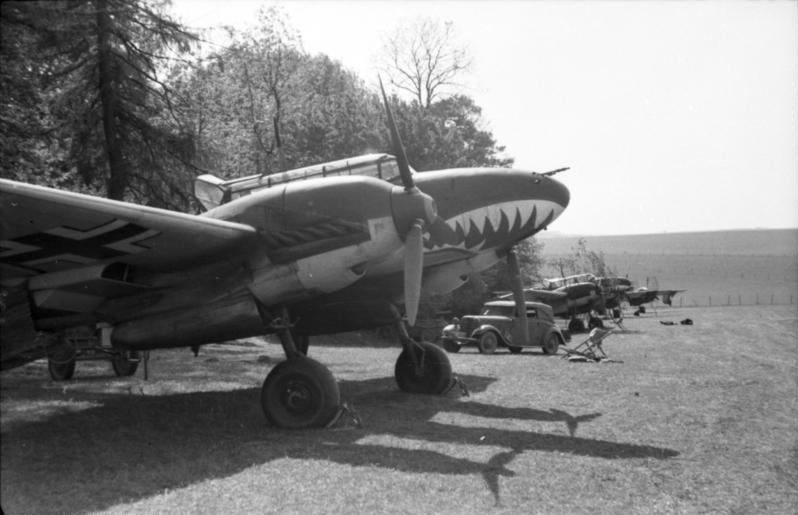
A Bf 110 similar to one flown by Specht. Notice the shark's mouth painted on the nose

Having joined the Luftwaffe in 1935 and completed his pilot training, when war started in September 1939 Specht was a Leutnant in 3./ZG 26 "Horst Wessel" (the 3rd squadron of the 26th Heavy Fighter Wing). Supposedly equipped with the new, twin-engine, Messerschmitt Bf 110 heavy fighter, its production was so far behind schedule that 7 of the 10 Zerstörergruppen (including Specht's I./ZG 26) had to be equipped with old Messerschmitt Bf 109C and D single-engined fighters. They thus took no role in the Polish campaign, instead based on the North Sea coast near Wilhelmshaven.

This was virtually the only part of the Western Front, during the Phoney War, where there was significant aerial activity in the early months of the war, as RAF bombers flew unescorted raids on the German naval bases. So it did not take long for Specht to score his first victories: two Handley Page Hampden medium bombers in a squadron conducting an armed reconnaissance operation near Heligoland, shot down on 29 September. Needing a long-range fighter to better intercept the British bombers at distance, I./ZG 26 was thus the next Gruppe selected for re-equipping onto the Bf 110.

On 3 December 1939, 24 RAF Vickers Wellington bombers from Marham and Mildenhall bases attacked Heligoland. These were intercepted by I./ZG 26 along with other Messerschmitt Bf 109 units. Specht scored his third victory, shooting down a bomber over the North Sea. But he was also hit by return fire from the Wellington's tail gunner, seriously wounding him in the face. Ditching into the sea, he was picked up by rescue craft. Losing the sight in his left eye, he spent the next six months in recovery. He was shot down by Corporal Copley of No. 38 Squadron RAF.

However, he returned to active service, as Gruppe Adjutant of I./ZG 26. Still able to fly combat missions, his aircraft sported a pencil under his Adjutant's chevron – bemoaning the combat pilot's universal loathing of paperwork! During the French campaign, on 23 May 1940, Spitfires were encountered by Bf 110s and Bf 109s for the first time. The engagement resulted in the loss of two Bf 110s and two Bf 109s. However, Specht would claim three RAF Supermarine Spitfire fighters shot down. The British No. 92 Squadron RAF involved lost three Spitfires in the entire engagement. Squadron Leader Roger J Bushell became a prisoner of war while Paul H. Klipsch and Patrick Alexander George Learmond were killed in action. During the course of this battle, Specht and his rear gunner/radio operator were wounded and forced to land near Calais and Boulogne-sur-Mer with a damaged aircraft. Again he was badly injured and spent further time in hospital.

After recovering he took up staff duties for a year, until 16 September 1941, when he was made Staffelkapitän (Squadron leader) of a newly formed night-fighter training unit, 2./Nachtjagdschule 1 (coming out of 2./Zerstörerschule 1). Soon after, on 31 October, Hauptmann (Captain) Specht was promoted to Kommandeur of III./NJS 1. Located at Ingolstadt-Manching, Specht instructed pilots in conversion to night fighting. Paul Zorner, a future night fighter expert, was one of his students. Leading the Gruppe for exactly one year, this was the last time Specht flew a twin engine aircraft, whereupon he returned to combat duties.

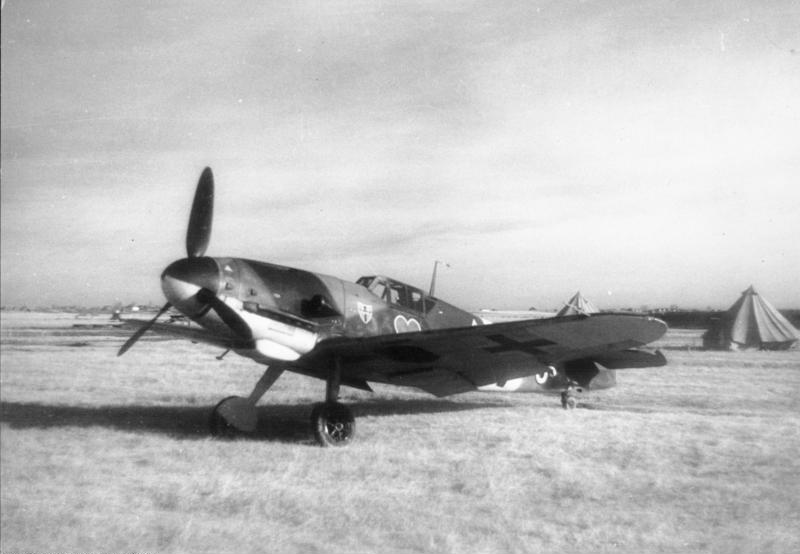
A Bf 109 Gustav similar to one used by Specht

Initially reassigned to 10./JG 1 based in the Ruhr, he shot down his first Viermot (four-engined bomber), a Boeing B-17 Flying Fortress on a mission to Wilhelmshaven, his 7th aerial victory, on 26 February 1943. This was the beginning of a new war for Specht – the 8th USAAF was starting its bombing offensive on the Reich's industrial complex. Soon afterward, on 27 March, he was appointed Staffelkapitän of the newly reformed 7./JG 1, then in May 1943 he was promoted to Gruppenkommandeur of II./JG 11, succeeding Major Adolf Dickfeld who was transferred. Command of his former 7. Staffel then went to Oberleutnant Heinrich Klöpper. Jagdgeschwader 11 was a new fighter wing, created in April 1943 by dividing Jagdgeschwader 1 (flying Fw 190s) in half and filling it out into a full wing with new Gruppen flying Bf 109G-6 'gunboats', to increase the homeland protection. He was based back near his original airfields on the North Sea coast, his unit the first line of defense against the bomber streams and their fighter escorts.

Throughout 1943, as the Luftwaffe took the fight to the bombers flying unescorted over the Reich, Specht scored regularly. Leading by example, he soon became one of the top Viermot aces shooting down 14 bombers out of his 18 victories that year. This included his 13th victory on 26 July, during Blitz Week, when bombers targeted the Blohm & Voss U Boat yards in Hamburg and the synthetic rubber factories of Continental AG and Nordhafen in Hanover.; as well a pair on 17 August on the Schweinfurt–Regensburg mission. He was awarded the Honour Goblet of the Luftwaffe (Ehrenpokal der Luftwaffe) on 23 August, and the German Cross in Gold (Deutsches Kreuz in Gold) on 25 November. Specht became increasingly critical of the relatively weak armament of the Bf 109 during this time. Towards the end of 1943, with longer-ranged fighter-escorts accompanying the Allied bombers, tactics had to change: The single-engined fighters would engage the fighter screen while a Zerstörergruppe would take on the bombers. Coincidentally, for a while Specht's II./JG 11 was paired up with his old unit, I./ZG 26.

He continued his success into 1944: On 11 February 1944 II./JG 11 engaged escort fighters returning from a raid on Frankfurt with Specht downing 2nd Lieutenant Richard McDonald of the 354th Fighter Group, who crashed his P-51 Mustang "Plane Jane" near Oberalben. Nine days later, (the opening of the 8th USAAF's "Big Week") Specht had to crash land on the Ærø Island as a result of technical problems with his Bf 109G. Despite that, he was back in the air the next day claiming a P-47 fighter, and a bomber and a fighter the day after, to take his tally to 30. On 15 March II./JG 11 lost six killed in action, two wounded, and eight aircraft lost, resulting in Specht declaring the unit non-operational for six weeks to rest and replace losses.

On 8 April 1944 Specht was awarded the Knight's Cross of the Iron Cross (Ritterkreuz des Eisernen Kreuzes) for his 30 victories on the Western Front. On 15 April, after his commander Hermann Graf was injured on 29 March, he transferred his command of II./JG 11 to Major Günther Rall, and moved to the Geschwaderstab (Wing Command flight) as Kommodore-in-training, under Herbert Ihlefeld. Specht was given full command of JG 11 on 15 May, replacing Ihlefeld who was himself transferred to command JG 1. But little could be done as the Allied bombing offensive stepped up a gear. His units were decimated over the skies of Normandy in June and July. He himself was injured in July, suffering head injuries in yet another crash-landing. Despite severe pain from his injuries, Specht remained on combat duty. His wing was retired to the Rhineland to be rebuilt, but they were crushed again in the latter half of 1944. The Allies were now sending overwhelming numbers of bombers to destroy the German industrial and military factories and the bombers were now protected by the advent of the P-51 Mustang, providing fighter cover right into the heart of the Reich and back.

During Operation Market Garden, the Allied parachute landings in the Netherlands, Specht claimed two RAF Hawker Typhoons west of Arnhem on 26 September. According to RAF records only three Typhoons were shot down on 26 September; two to flak and one in aerial combat against Jagdgeschwader 53 Bf 109s near Apeldoorn. No fighters were recorded lost near Deventer. However, it may be the case that loss records were lost or not well kept, meaning Specht's claims cannot be traced and may well be accurate.

=== Operation Bodenplatte ===
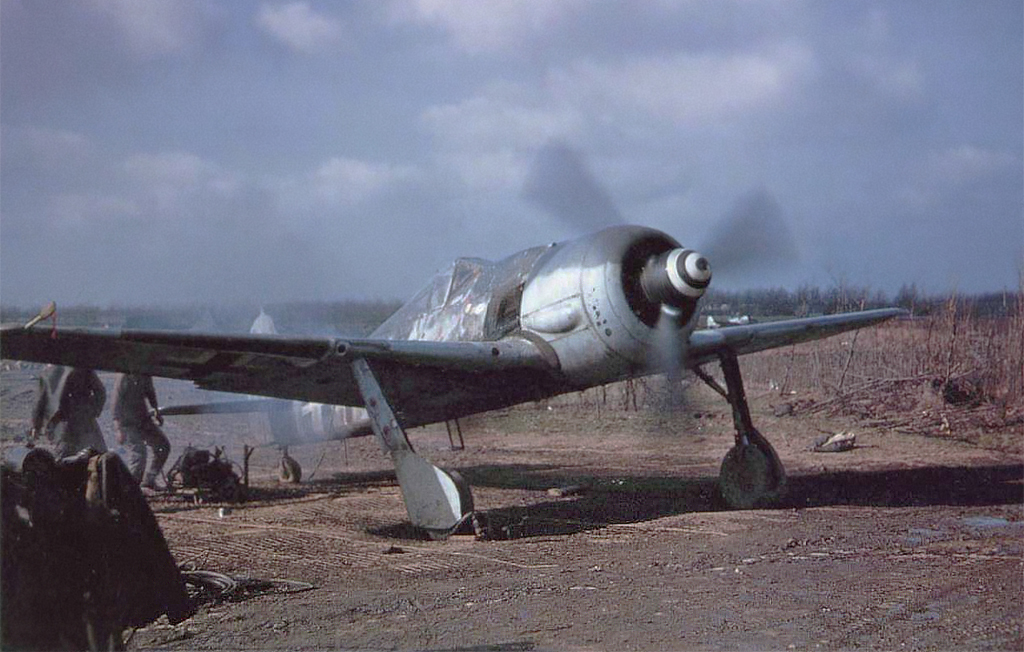
An Fw 190 A-8/R2 in American hands. This Fw 190 was captured during Bodenplatte. Specht flew an Fw 190A on this date.

In December, Hitler ordered his final, desperate attack in the west - through the snow-covered forests of the Ardennes. Poor weather kept the promised air support grounded, but early on the morning of New Year's Day, long after it was tactically useful or relevant, the Luftwaffe launched Operation Bodenplatte ('Baseplate') - not against the devastating strategic bombers, but on the frontline fighter airbases.

Virtually all available fighter groups in the west were allocated to this mission, JG 11 was assigned the USAAF airfield at Asch (Code Name Y–29) and the RAF airfield at Ophoven north of Asch. The 366th Fighter Group (366th FG, Ninth Air Force) and the 352nd Fighter Group (352 FG, Eighth Air Force) were based at Asch. No. 41, No. 130, 350 and No. 610 Squadrons of the 2nd Tactical Wing were based at Ophoven.

For this mission Specht wore his full dress uniform with medals instead of his flight suit. JG 11 was based at Darmstadt-Griesheim, Zellhausen, and Gross-Ostheim. I./JG 11, III./JG 11 (Fw 190 A–9), and II./JG 11 (Bf 109 G) mustered sixty-five aircraft for this mission. Specht flew Fw 190 A-9 (Werknummer 205033—factory number) "Black 4". Overall the operation was a major failure. With the large proportion of inexperienced, green pilots, flight coordination was extremely difficult and due to the extreme secrecy many pilots were shot down by their own FlaK antiaircraft, who were not pre-warned of the operation. It also resulted in the loss of a number of irreplaceable combat leaders.

As regards JG 11 specifically, at 08:08 am (Note: According to Unteroffizier Ludwig Bertram of I./JG 1, the Geschwader took off at 08:08 am.) the aircraft took off and assembled over Aschaffenburg with two Junkers Ju 188 'Pathfinders' to navigate. After assembling, Specht ordered all aircraft to fly at 400 feet (120 m) to the target area, climbing to 1,500 feet (460 m) prior to commencing the attack. Some P-47 Thunderbolts of the 390th Fighter Squadron, 366th FG, were already airborne and Mustangs of the 487th Fighter Squadron, 352nd FG, were on the runway. The formation was disrupted by flak, and several German aircraft were shot down. (Note: Zorner (not being there) did not know the reason for putting on the uniform. But he speculated that Specht may have known about his impending death.)

The P-47 and P-51s took a heavy toll of JG 11; some 25 pilots were lost, including Specht, who was posted as Missing In Action, along with other senior officers of JG 11.

=== Death and subsequent confusion ===
There was some confusion over the circumstance of Specht's death. Lt. Melvin Paisley and his wingman Flight Officer Dave Johnson were flying 366th FG P-47s; Johnson shot down two German fighters before his aircraft was heavily damaged from return fire. Bailing out, he landed in a field near Asch. A Bf 109 he had shot down had belly landed close by and Johnson rode a borrowed bicycle over to inspect it. The aircraft was intact but the pilot was dead. Johnson took the pilot's identification card and gun and rode back to base. The identification card identified the pilot as an Oberstleutnant (lieutenant colonel); however, the card actually belonged to Oberleutnant (German: Oberleutnant) August Engel of 8. Staffel.

Further research has revealed more detail. German records confirmed Specht flew a Fw 190, not a Bf 109, and that he was a Major at the time, confirming Johnson's victim was most likely to have been Engel. Johnson's claim form revealed he had claimed a Bf 109, not an Fw 190. The ID card of Johnson's victim was passed on to a member of the ground crew who spoke German. This individual stated that the rank was given as lieutenant colonel. The incorrect identification was most likely a language error and misunderstanding of German ranks. This may have caused the belief that Johnson had killed Specht. Johnson died in October 1976, and aviation historians were unable to secure his version of events.

Specht was officially listed as missing in action over Maastricht, but he has recently been confirmed dead. He crashed his plane after taking heavy fire. Specht was promoted posthumously to Oberstleutnant and nominated for the Eichenlaub (Oak Leaves to the Knight's Cross) though this was never awarded in the bedlam of the final weeks of the war. Shot down six times in his career, he preferred to try landing his damaged aircraft rather than taking to his parachute. Specht was credited with 34 aerial victories, which according to Obermaier included 17 heavy bombers, all achieved over the Western Front. (Note: The similar but differing meaning of Oberleutnant and Oberstleutnant may have contributed to the misunderstanding. It is not clear whether Johnson himself said Specht's name was on the ID card. Johnson died in 1976 and the authors were unable to confirm this.)

== Summary of career ==
=== Aerial victory claims ===
Mathews and Foreman, authors of Luftwaffe Aces — Biographies and Victory Claims, researched the German Federal Archives and found records for 31 aerial victory claims, including 15 heavy bombers, plus three further unconfirmed claims, all of which claimed on the Western Front.

Victory claims were logged to a map-reference (PQ = Planquadrat), for example "PQ 05 Ost TN-6". The Luftwaffe grid map (Jägermeldenetz) covered all of Europe, western Russia and North Africa and was composed of rectangles measuring 15 minutes of latitude by 30 minutes of longitude, an area of about 360 square miles (930 km^{2}). These sectors were then subdivided into 36 smaller units to give a location area 3 km × 4 km (1.9 mi × 2.5 mi) in size.

Chronicle of aerial victories
This and the ? (question mark) indicates information discrepancies listed by Prien, Stemmer, Rodeike, Bock, Mathews and Foreman.
Claim	Date	Time	Type	Location	Claim	Date	Time	Type	Location
– Claims with 3. Staffel of Zerstörergeschwader 26 – "Phoney War" — 1 September – 5 December 1939
1	29 September 1939	10:01	Hampden	southeast of Heligoland	3	3 December 1939	—	Wellington	northwest of Heligoland
2	29 September 1939	10:05	Hampden	southeast of Heligoland					
– Claims with 3. Staffel of Zerstörergeschwader 26 – Battle of France — 10 May – 5 December 1939
4	23 May 1940	—	Spitfire	vicinity of Calais	6	23 May 1940	—	Spitfire	vicinity of Calais
5	23 May 1940	—	Spitfire	vicinity of Calais					
– Claims with 10. Staffel of Jagdgeschwader 1 – German Bight — January – March 1943
7	26 February 1943	12:18	B-17	80 km (50 mi) northwest of Borkum					
– Claims with II. Gruppe of Jagdgeschwader 11 – Defense of the Reich — 1 April – 31 December 1943
8	14 May 1943	12:10? (Note: According to Mathews and Foreman claimed at 12:14.)	B-24	east of Schleswig; Eckernförde Bay	17	4 October 1943	10:16	B-24	PQ 05 Ost TN-6
9	15 May 1943	10:55	B-17	Schönberg; Elbe estuary	18	8 October 1943	16:39	B-24	PQ 05 Ost AR-6, over sea northwest of Nordholz
10	19 May 1943	13:17	B-17	PQ 05 Ost 85/6/2, south of Pellworm	19	9 October 1943	15:30	B-17	PQ 05 Ost ML-8
11	11 June 1943	18:05	B-17	PQ 05 Ost 7/1/8	20	13 November 1943	11:20	P-38	PQ 05 Ost FQ-7/3; Fürstenau
12	25 June 1943	08:52	B-17	PQ 05 Ost AQ-5/6 off the Frisian Islands	21	26 November 1943	12:20? (Note: According to Mathews and Foreman claimed at 12:30.)	B-17	PQ 05 Ost ER-2/7
13	26 July 1943	11:42	B-17	PQ 05 Ost FS-5/4 north of Wagenfeld	22	29 November 1943	15:30	P-47	PQ 05 Ost S/EQ-5/7
14	28 July 1943	09:02	B-17	PQ 05 Ost RS-4/7 south of Darmstadt	23	20 December 1943	11:50	P-51	Bremen
15	17 August 1943	15:00	B-17	22 km (14 mi) north-northeast of Diest	24? (Note: In the 1994 book by Prien and Rodeike, this claim is listed as Spechts 24th aerial victory. Authors Mathews and Foremann also consider this claim unconfirmed.)	22 December 1943	—	P-47	
16	17 August 1943	15:20	B-17	2 km (1.2 mi) west of Hergarden					
– Claims with II. Gruppe of Jagdgeschwader 11 – Defense of the Reich — January – June 1944
25? (Note: According to Mathews and Foremann, this claim is unconfirmed.)	5 January 1944	—	P-38		28	21 February 1944	13:54	P-47	PQ 05 Ost S/GT/GU, vicinity of Liethe
26?	30 January 1944	—	P-47		29	22 February 1944	13:25? (Note: According to Mathews and Foreman claimed at 13:45.)	P-51	PQ 05 Ost S/HS/HT, vicinity of Blomberg
27	11 February 1944	12:15? (Note: According to Mathews and Foreman claimed at 12:30.)	P-51	PQ 05 Ost S/SP-6, area of W/r-s vicinity of Worms	30	22 February 1944	13:42? (Note: According to Mathews and Foreman claimed at 13:50.)	B-17	PQ 05 Ost S/HT, vicinity of Detmold
– Claims with Stab of Jagdgeschwader 11 – Western Front — September – October 1944
31	11 September 1944	—	P-51		33	26 September 1944	14:06	Typhoon	PQ 05 Ost S/HN/GN, vicinity of Arnhem
32	26 September 1944	14:04? (Note: According to Mathews and Foreman claimed at 14:06.)	Typhoon	PQ 05 Ost S/HN/GN, vicinity of Arnhem					
– Claims with Stab of Jagdgeschwader 11 – Defense of the Reich — November – December 1944
34	5 December 1944	12:35	P-51	south of Mittelland Canal					

=== Awards ===
- Iron Cross in 1939 2nd and 1st Class.
- Honour Goblet of the Luftwaffe on 23 August 1943 as Hauptmann and Gruppenkommandeur
- German Cross in Gold on 25 November 1943 while serving in the II./Jagdgeschwader 11
- Knight's Cross of the Iron Cross on 8 April 1944 as Major and Gruppenkommandeur of the II./Jagdgeschwader 11

=== Dates of rank ===
August 1939:	Leutnant
23 May 1940:	Oberleutnant
May 1943:	Hauptmann
8 April 1944:	Major, (or possibly 1 May 1944)
(posthumously)	Oberstleutnant

== See also ==
- Organizational Hierarchy of the Luftwaffe during WW II

== Military Offices held ==
Military offices
Preceded by None	Group Adjutant of I./ZG 26; May 1940 – 31 October 1941	Succeeded by Oberleutnant Rüdiger Proske
Preceded by None: new unit	Squadron Leader of 2./Nachtjagdschule 1; 16 September 1941 – 31 October 1941	Unknown
Preceded by None: new unit	Group Commander of III./Nachtjagdschule 1; 31 October 1941 – 31 October 1942	Succeeded by Hauptmann Helmut Peters
Preceded by None: new unit	Squadron Leader of 7./JG 1; 27 March 1943 – May 1943	Succeeded by Leutnant Heinrich Klöpper
Preceded by Major Adolf Dickfeld	Group Commander of II./JG 11; May 1943 – 15 May 1944	Succeeded by Major Günther Rall
Preceded by Major Herbert Ihlefeld	Wing Commander of JG 11; 15 May 1944 – 1 January 1945	Succeeded by Major Jürgen Harder
