= Jagdgeschwader 11 =

- Emblem of Jagdgeschwader 11. Based on Arno Breker's "The Guardian".
- Active: 1943–45
- Disbanded: 4 April 1945
- Country: German Reich
- Allegiance: Nazi Germany
- Branch: Luftwaffe
- Type: Fighter Aircraft
- Role: Air superiority
- Size: Air Force Wing
- Equipment: Bf 109, Fw 190
- Engagements: Defense of the Reich, Operation Baseplate

Commanders
- Notable commanders: Hermann Graf; Anton Hackl; Herbert Ihlefeld; Günther Specht

Aircraft flown
- Fighter: Bf 109, Fw 190

Jagdgeschwader 11 (JG 11) was a fighter wing (German: Jagdgeschwader) of the German Luftwaffe during World War II. Its primary role was the defense of Northern Germany against Allied day bomber raids. Formed in April 1943 as a split from Jagdgeschwader 1, the unit primarily used the Messerschmitt Bf 109 and Focke-Wulf Fw 190.

The unit was initially based along the North German coast, protecting the northern flank of occupied Europe. During the summer of 1943, as the unescorted bombers penetrated deeper into Germany, JG 11 saw intensive action, with about 40 percent of some 1,200 claims submitted by the Western Front fighter wings in this period being credited to JG 1 and JG 11 .

JG 11 trialled new tactics such as dropping 250 kg bombs on top of the bomber formations or using the heavy-calibre Werfer-Granate 21 unguided, underwing-launched rockets. In spring of 1944 the introduction of P-51 Mustang made the job of units such as JG 11 very difficult as they fought through the escorts to reach the bombers. Several measures were introduced to counter the bomber offensive such as the introduction of Bf 109–G high altitude aircraft with a pressurized cockpit.

In January 1945, the Luftwaffe made a last-ditch counterattack to stem the Allied offensives with Operation Baseplate. JG 11 targeted the USAAF base at Asch, Belgium called Y–29 and Ophoven, the Netherlands. What followed became known as the "Legend of Y–29". JG 11 lost its commander and several group commanders with many pilots. The unit surrendered to British forces in early May 1945.

== Formation history ==
Under the increasing threat of the Allied heavy bombers, the Luftwaffe decided to augment its fighter strength by creating a new wing (German: Geschwader) by splitting Jagdgeschwader 1 (JG 1). On 31 March 1943, JG 1 had four component groups (German: Gruppen) I., II., III. and IV./JG 1. Of these III./JG 1, located in Husum, was redesignated as I./JG 11 while I./JG 1, under Günther Beise, located in Jever became II./JG 11. A new III./JG 11 was raised under German: Hauptmann Ernst-Günther Heinze at Neumünster, equipped with the Messerschmitt Bf 109G-6. A headquarters flight (German: Geschwaderstab) was formed in Jever. Former group commander (German: Gruppenkommandeur) of II./JG 77, Major Anton Mader was appointed to command the new unit.

The new unit was responsible for the day defense of the German Bight, southern Norway and western Denmark. This was previously the eastern portion of JG 1's area of responsibility. JG 11 reported to the Fighter Commander of the German Bight (German: Jagdfliegerführer Deutsche Bucht) in the 2nd Fighter Division (German: 2. Jagd-Division). By mid-1943, JG 11 came under the control of the Luftwaffe Commander Center (German: Luftwaffenbefehlshaber Mitte) (Lw Bfh), which later formed Air Fleet Germany (German: Luftflotte Reich).

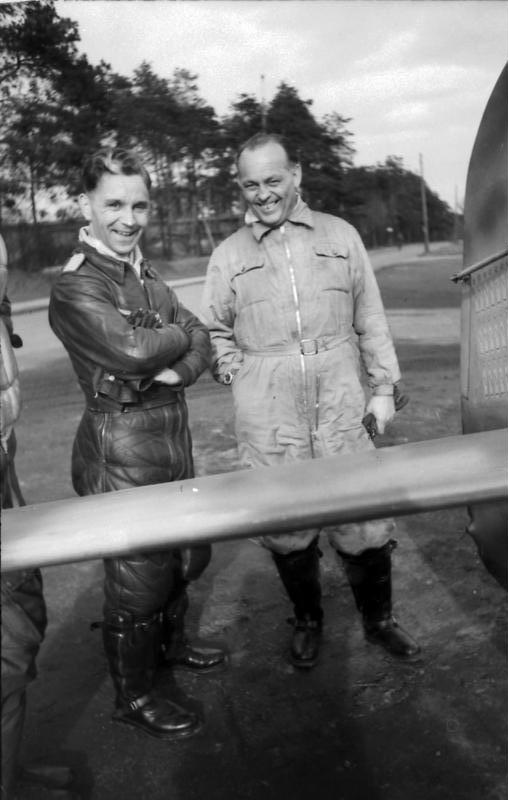
Hauptmann Günther Specht (left) with Dr. Kurt Tank beside the tail of his aircraft in July 1944

In late June 1943 Hauptmann Günther Specht replaced Major Adolf Dickfeld as II./JG 11's commander. A perfectionist and one of the most competent group commanders, Specht led basically every mission after taking command. And eventually in a few months II./JG 11 became one of the most effective day fighter units!

In mid-November 1943 Mader had a public fall-out with Generalmajor Max Ibel of 2. Jagd-Division and was sent to the Eastern Front to command Jagdgeschwader 54. He was replaced by Oberstleutnant Hermann Graf, an Eastern Front Bf 109 ace and the first pilot to claim 200 victories.

1./JG 11 relocated to Salzwedel and 2./JG 11 to Lüneburg in April 1944 remaining there until June 1944, while Specht was transferred to Geschwaderstab JG 11 as a Kommodore-In-Training. He was replaced by Major Günther Rall from JG 52 as Gruppenkommandeur of II./JG 11, located at Eschborn being rebuilt. III./JG 11 was dispatched to Minsk in anticipation of the impending Soviet offensive, but its ten-week stay did little to effect the outcome of the land battle.

=== Jasta Helgoland ===
In 1941, two short runways were built on neighboring sand dunes on Heligoland, an island in the middle of the German Bight. A fighter squadron (German: Staffel) was established on 7 April 1943 under First Lieutenant (German: Oberleutnant) Hermann Hintzen, equipped with the Bf 109T Toni. This was the only Bf 109 variant able to take off from those short runways due to its longer wing span. The Staffel reported to Jagdfliegerführer Deutsche Bucht. In mid-April 1943, the Staffel was subordinated to 2. Jagd–Division. This Staffel worked to a great extent with the units of JG 11. On 30 November 1943, it was merged with JG 11 to boost operational strength of JG 11.

=== Aircraft of JG 11 ===
JG 11 was initially equipped with the Fw 190 A-4 and Bf 109 G-1. It also used the Fw 190 A-6/R1, which carried six 20 mm MG 151 cannons. Towards the end of 1943 III./JG 11 started converting to the Focke-Wulf Fw 190. JG 11 tended to use a combination of Bf 109s and Fw 190s, the Bf 109 for attacking fighters and the Fw 190 for attacking bombers.

In March 1943 II./JG 11 started to replace the Bf 109 G-1 with the Bf 109 G-6. The G-6 had the option of two 20 mm cannons in underwing gondolas which made it more useful in destroying the tough American bombers.

On 26 June 1943 a trial Wilde Sau unit was established to verify the night-fighting theories of Major Hajo Herrmann. Equipped with the Bf 109 at Bonn-Hangelar, the unit was expanded into I./JG 300 and JG 300 Geschwaderstab. With insufficient numbers of Bf 109 aircraft to equip the formation they 'borrowed' aircraft from II./JG 11 (at Rheine) and III./JG 11 (at Oldenburg). Operating aircraft by day and also by night the extra wear and tear on their aircraft and resulting lower serviceability rates made the arrangement very unpopular with the JG 11 maintenance personnel.

=== Unit Emblems and color schemes ===
In January 1944 JG 11 was located in Dortmund alongside one group German: Gruppe of JG 1. In order to make it easier to regroup after an engagement and aid unit identification both I./JG 1 and JG 11 followed the new Luftwaffe policy and painted their aircraft with special Defense of the Reich, aft fuselage bands. I./JG 1 used a red band and JG 11 used a yellow band.

The Third Staffel of JG 11 (3./JG 11) was formed from 9./JG 1 and perpetuated that unit's distinctive logo of a flintlock pistol on a red heart surrounded by the German words, "Wer zuerst schiesst hat mehr vom Leben", which translates as "Who shoots first gets more out of life".

== Wartime history ==
=== 1943 ===
==== April – June 1943 ====
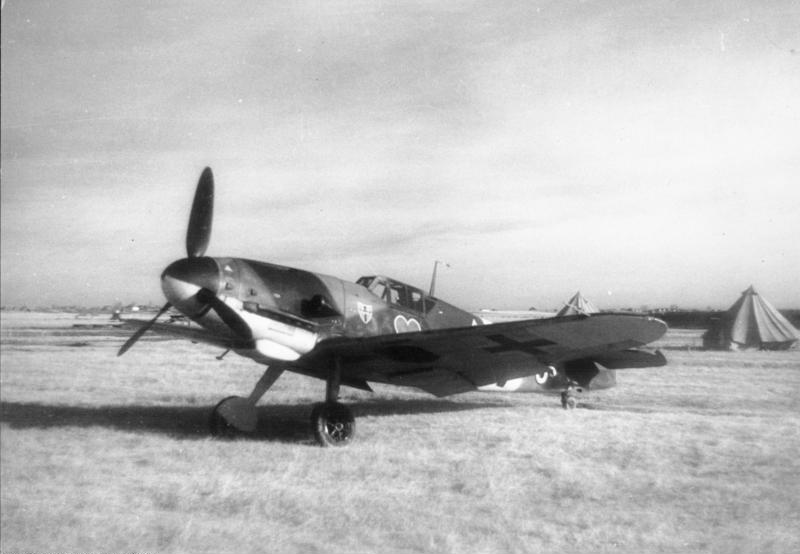
A Bf 109 Gustav similar to the ones used by JG 11

JG 11 saw action immediately after its formation, with one of the first large daylight raids on 17 April 1943. 115 aircraft from four B-17 bomb groups attacked the Focke-Wulf factory outside Bremen. They were initially intercepted by II./JG 11, accompanied by Jasta Helgoland. A total of 16 bombers were claimed, II./JG 11 was credited with 7 and Jasta Heligoland credited with one. The new leader of II./JG 11 Major Adolf Dickfeld claimed the first B-17. Oberleutnant Heinz Knoke (leading 5./JG 11) shot down one B–17 after missing the original target for his bomb dropped over the formation. The downed bombers included six of the 401st Bomb Squadron (91 BG). Four aircraft of II./JG 11 were damaged in deadstick landings as they exhausted their fuel. One aircraft of the Jasta Helgoland was shot down north of Norderney but the pilot bailed out. In another raid that same day light bombers of Royal Air Force (RAF) No. 2 Group bombed Abbeville. With the escorts engaged by other units, I. and II./JG 11 attacked the bombers before their bomb run. Knoke's unit carried bombs, but all the bombs missed. Both Gruppen conducted frontal attacks on for almost an hour with five claims filed without loss. Three Bf 109s of II./JG 11 ran out of fuel and had to do deadstick landings over the Frisians.

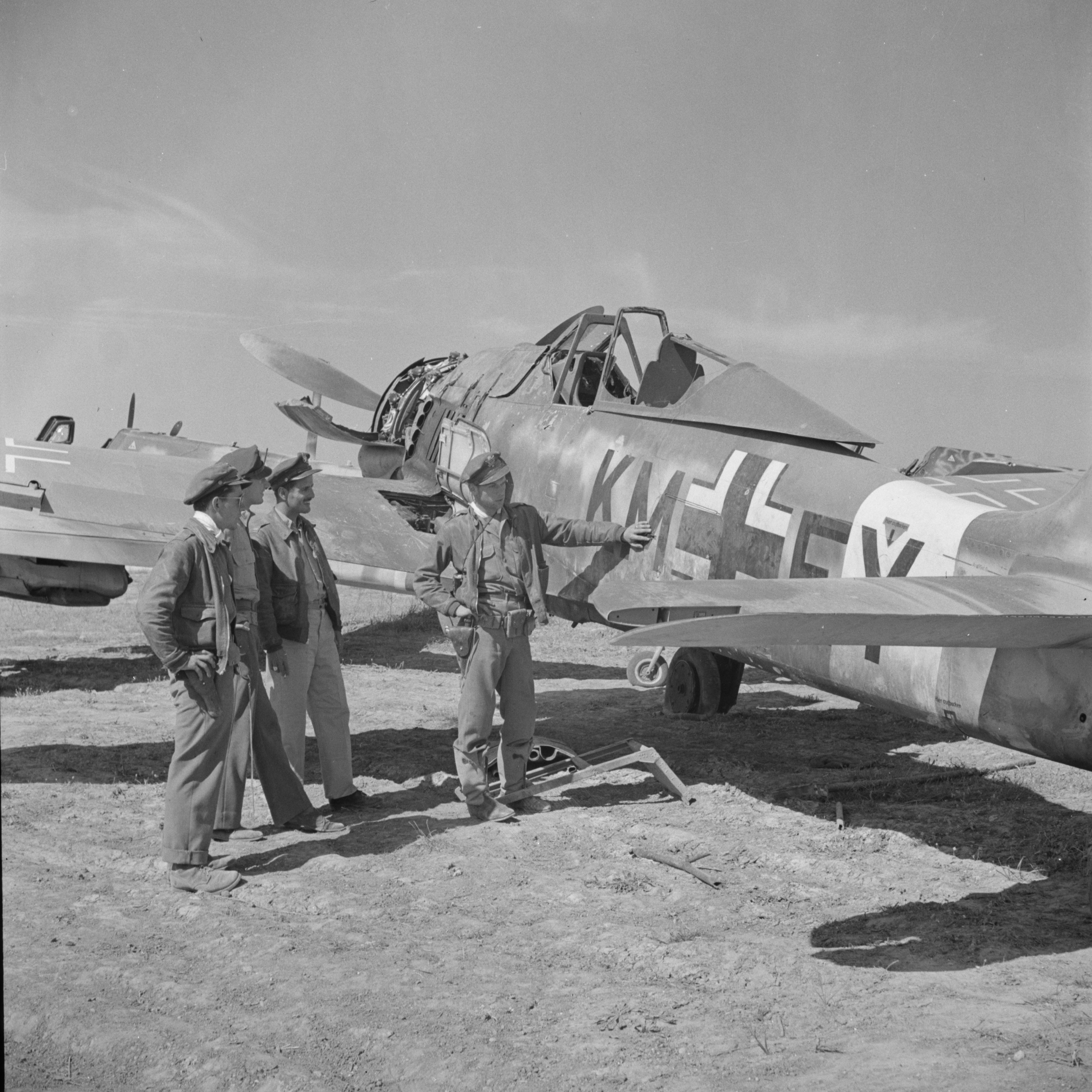
A Fw 190 A–4 similar to the ones used by JG 11

On 14 May 1943 multiple groups of heavy bombers conducted several missions across the Low Countries. One hundred B-17s and B-24s bombed Kiel U-Boat Base on the Baltic Sea. II./JG 11, again with Jasta Helgoland intercepted, now flying the new Bf 109G-6 variant with underwing 20 mm cannon. Knoke's unit still attempted bombing from above the formation and tried to position entire unit above the formation. But when the leading bombers reached the Germania shipyards located on the port's eastern side inner basin Knoke gave up trying and ordered individual pilots to drop their bombs over the bombers and make a head-on pass on a group of bombers slightly separated from the main formation. A B-17 (42-30003) of 92nd BG was hit and according to Knoke, "the Fortress reared like a stricken animal, before falling in steep spirals to the right". Other bomber crews described it "circling and going down under control with one engine out and a stabilizer missing". It went down near Husum but the crew of 10 survived. This was Knoke's fifth claim in less than three months, making him the first Bf 109 ace of the "Defense of the Reich" campaign. Two other B-17s were shot down, one credited to Staffelkapitän of 6./JG 11 Hauptmann Egon Falkensamer. Following this interception I./JG 11, accompanied by Bf 110s of NJG 3, intercepted and two pilots of I./JG 11 claimed one bomber each. A group of 17 B-24Ds (44th BG) were intercepted by II./JG 11 and III./JG 54, and claimed seven of the B-24s (one credited to Specht) for the loss of five fighters. Five claims were confirmed with 12 bombers damaged.

24 hours later nine B-24 groups attacked the North sea ports of Wilhelmshaven and Emden. The formation attacking Wilhelmshaven had to abort due to poor visibility over the target so instead attacked secondary targets, Heligoland Düne; the base of Jasta Heligoland and Wangerooge. They were intercepted by II./JG 1 and III./JG 54. II./JG 11 was credited with four bombers downed; one each to Dickfeld, Specht, Knoke and Unteroffizier Helmut Lennartz. Lennartz claimed his B-24 by dropping a bomb above the formation.^{[b]}^{[c]}

The mission on 11 June 1943 was the largest thus far, involving 250 B-17s. II./JG 1 and III./JG 1 intercepted a formation approaching Wilhelmshaven, resulting in ten claims for II./JG 11, including one each for Specht and Knoke. Two days later 60 B-17s of 95th BG attacked Kiel. II./JG 11 scrambled accompanied by Jasta Helgoland, but only one was claimed by Unteroffizier Ewald Herhold west of Neumünster, Herhold being injured in the knee while making two passes at the bombers and bailing out. Another pilot of Jasta Helgoland crashlanded in Föhr. A second 'probable' B-17 was claimed by Leutnant Kilian of 5./JG 11. Another 6 bombers went down over Kiel.

During the raid on 25 June 1943 cloud cover obscured both primary and secondary targets so the B-17s bombed two convoys off of the Frisian Islands. II and III./JG 11 intercepted, along with six other Gruppen, and claimed six bombers. Specht and Knoke claimed one each but Knoke was injured in the hand.

==== Operation Gomorrah/Blitz Week ====
During the period of 24 to 30 July, the RAF and USAAF launched a combined series of attacks on German targets known as "Blitz Week". This was a six-day round-the-clock offensive on targets inside Germany. Weather on 25 July was not favorable so two of the bomber formations attacked secondary targets, while a third abandoned their mission. II./JG 11 along with Jasta Helgoland intercepted and claimed six destroyed, with four pilots injured. The following day targets included Continental and Nordhafen rubber works in Hanover along with Hamburg U-Boat Yards. A total of 15 bombers were claimed downed, claimants including Specht and 7./JG 11 Staffelkapitän Hugo Frey.

On 28 July 1943 15 bombers of the VIII Bomber Command targeted the Fieseler Works in Kassel and the AGO Factory in Oschersleben; used for subcontract work on the Focke-Wulf Fw 190 fighters. II./JG 11 intercepted and after a 20-minute engagement claimed 12 bombers. Those credited included Specht and 4./JG 11 Staffelkapitän Oberleutnant Gerhard Sommer. Knoke's 5. Staffel carried out air bombing and claimed seven bombers. Unteroffizier Wilhelm "Jonny" Fest's bomb hit a B-17F of the 385th BG (42-30257). It collided with two other bombers, Betty Boom (42-3316) and Roundtrip Ticket (42-30285) and all three went down west of Sylt. Allied records attributed the loss of 42-30257 to a flak hit and other sources credit the bomber to underwing rockets of Erprobungskommando 25 attached to I./JG 1 at the time. III./JG 11 claimed two more bombers over Hanover, while a refueled II./JG 1 and Jasta Helgoland claimed three more on the bomber's return journey.

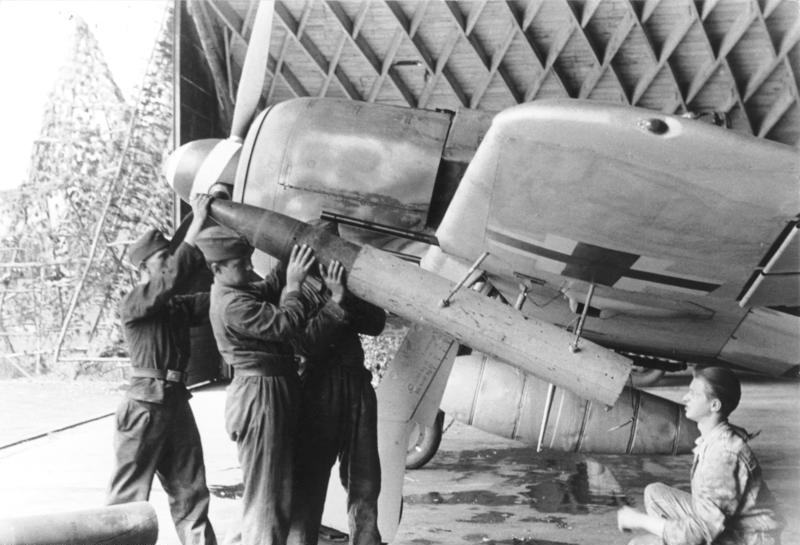
Loading the underwing WGr 21 rocket

The following day the Eighth Air Force targeted Kiel's U-Boat yards and the Heinkel factory in Warnemünde. Elements of JG 11 with JG 1 used Werfer-Granate 21 (Wfr. Gr. or WGr prefix, also known as the Bordrakete 21/BR 21 in official Luftwaffe manuals) underwing rockets for the first time. The American bomber crews dubbed these "flaming baseballs". While being wildly inaccurate these rockets, containing 40.8 kg (90 lb) of explosive, could be launched from well outside the range of the bomber's defensive fire and were intended to break up the bomber formations. The launchers did however seriously reduce the performance of the fighters, making them easy prey to any Allied fighter escort. II. and III./JG 11 engaged the bombers on their return route near Heligoland, JG 11 claiming eight B-17s destroyed (III./JG 11 was credited with three aircraft). One III./JG 11 pilot was injured.

On the last day of Blitz Week (30 July) VIII Bomber Command targeted the Fieseler Works in Kassel. III./JG 11 and III./JG 1 were not scrambled until after the bombers crossed into Germany over Eifel. By the time they were in the air the bombers were near Emmerich am Rhein before they were intercepted. The Bf 109s were surprised by some 100 P-47 Thunderbolts escorts, newly equipped with drop tanks. III./JG 11 shot down two bombers but in the first major fighter combat of the Defense of the Reich lost four aircraft, with one pilot wounded and one dead. At the end of Blitz Week JG 11 had claimed some 49 bombers for six pilots injured and one killed.

==== August – December 1943 ====
VIII Bomber command only had one mission in September 1943 bombing Emden on 27 September. It saw the introduction of H2X radar on four of the bombers and the introduction of larger 108 U.S. gallon single-use, paper-mache drop tanks on the P-47. II./JG 11 intercepted the bombers from the south and Knoke's 5./JG 11 made a pass firing BR 21 under-wing rockets, shooting down two bombers. Despite the escort II./JG 11 claimed six more bombers shot down and 2 P-47 escorts but lost ten pilots, with four wounded.

The bombers returned to Emden on 2 October 1943 escorted by the P-47s. III./JG 11, under new leader Anton Hackl, intercepted with II./JG 3. Hackl was credited with two bombers (taking his score to 127), another bomber was credited to another pilot. Two days later bombers targeted Frankfurt and Saarland with two separate groups of B-24s splitting the fighter response. The groups made a successful diversionary sweep across the North Sea, disrupting the Luftwaffe defence. Specht led II., III./JG 11 and Jasta Heligoland in the attack, and I./JG 11 claimed five B-24s for gruppenkommandeur Erwin Clausen killed, while II./JG 11 claimed six B-24s (Specht and Knoke credited one each) and Staffelkapitän of Jasta Helgoland, Oberleutnant Hans-Heinrich Koenig credited with one. Feldwebel Hans–Gerd Wennekers of 5./JG 11 claimed two with 30 mm MK 108 cannon. His attack on the B-24 caused it to collide with the bomber above, taking both down. Allied records state four B-24s were shot down in the action, despite JG 11 claiming eleven victories. After returning to the airfield at Marx (near Wilhelmshaven), Specht bitterly complained to the High Command about the inadequate armament of the Bf 109G that often allowed damaged bombers to return home.

Six days later the bombers returned to Bremen and the U-Boat yards of Vegesack. II. and III./JG 11 intercepted and III./JG 11 claimed 11 bombers. Gruppenkommandeure Specht, Hackl and Olejnik, Knoke and Wennekers all claimed one each, and Siegfried Zick claimed one bomber south of Quakenbrück. Next day there was another attack on Kiel by B-17s with B-17F (42-5407) Fightin Pappy possibly downed by Frey. General der Jagdflieger Adolf Galland flew a Fw 190 during the day's fighting and witnessed some of the attacks over the Frisian Islands. To his "disgust", he saw the BR 21 rocket-equipped fighters launch from too long a range. He also noted attacks were disorganized. Galland waited for the fighters to return to base before making his own interception, claiming a B-17 on his second pass, though he did not report the kill since he was not officially authorised to fly in combat.

=== 1944 ===
JG 11 was transferred to II. Fliegerkorps for operations over France soon after the Allied invasion of 6 June 1944. Given the overwhelming superiority of the Allied fighter screens over the beach heads, the Luftwaffe units suffered heavily, JG 11 being no exception.

In August 1944 each JG 11 Gruppe was increased to four Staffeln, with a new 4./JG 11 formed from 10. and 11./JG 11. The old 4./JG 11 became the new 8./JG 11 Staffel. Old 7./JG 11 become 10./JG 11 and a new 7./JG 11 was formed from scratch.

On 17 December 1944 I./JG 11 was heavily engaged by P-47s over Munstereifel and later by P-38 Lightnings. Four German pilots were wounded with Unteroffizier Liebeck bailing out successfully. Unteroffizier Heyer, flying Black 1 shot down one P-38 before being seriously wounded and bailing out.

By December 1944 I./JG 11 were frequently paired with the 'Sturm' Fw 190's of IV./JG 4 in attacking heavy bomber formations over the Moselle River. The other two Gruppen of JG 11 operated under the administrative control of JG 2 engaging the fighters of Eighth and Ninth Air Force.

On 23 December I./JG 11 and JG 4 intercepted American bombers near the Trier region. JG 11 claimed 28 B-26s and several escorts while 12 Fw 190s and one P-51 went down. Major Arthur F. Jeffrey of 479 FG was credited with three victories. Fähnrich Kaluza and Oberleutnant Georg Ulrici of I./JG 11 failed to return from operations over Daun and Cochem while Unteroffizier Ehrke and Gefreiter were killed near Gillenfeld. Oberfähnrich Hans–Joachim Wesener was shot down south of Kaisersesch. JG 11's losses included 12 pilots killed, 4 missing and 11 wounded.

Later the same day JG 11 scrambled to intercept some seventy Martin B-26 Marauders of 387th and 394th Bombardment Groups heading for Marshalling yards at Mayen. Over Prüm and St. Vith they ran into the fighter escort and several of the JG 11 pilots were killed, including Major Erich Putzka, of the Gruppenstab and Oberfeldwebel Holland, chased by thirty P-47s. Oberfeldwebel Titscher was shot down by a Spitfire over Cologne. Two others were wounded over Munstereifel.

The next day American B-17 Flying Fortresses targeted JG 4 and JG 11's airfields. As JG 11 tried to protect its airfields they lost 4 pilots; Unteroffizier Stöhr killed over Gross-Ostheim, Feldwebel Horlacher over Gross-Karben and Leutnant Richter and Feldwebel Schulirsch did not return from the Moselle near Trier.

On 25 December there were more losses. Flight Lieutenant Sherk of No. 402 Squadron RCAF intercepted a lone Fw 190A-8 southeast of Düren, which he shot down. This may have been Unteroffizier Wolfgang Rosenow of 11./JG 11 who failed to return from a mission to Euskirchen. III./JG 11 also lost four pilots near Bonn and Cologne. I./JG 11 ran into more fighters over Eifel, and Unteroffiziere Holzinger and Weismüller were lost.

=== 1945 ===
==== Operation Baseplate ====
On New Year's Day 1945, the Luftwaffe launched Operation Baseplate, a massed low-level fighter strike targeted at Allied airfields in France, Belgium and the Netherlands in support of the German offensive in the Ardennes. Elements of JG 11 were allocated the USAAF air base coded Y-29 at Asch where the 366th Fighter Group (366th FG, Ninth Air Force) and the 352nd Fighter Group (352 FG, Eighth Air Force) were based. Also targeted was the Spitfire airfield at Ophoven, housing the RAF's No. 41, No. 130, 350 and No. 610 of the 2nd Tactical Wing.

At 8:00 AM, the three Gruppen of JG 11 took off from Darmstadt-Griesheim, Gross-Ostheim, and Zellhausen led by Specht. Some 65 Fw 190 and Bf 109s formed over Aschaffenburg at 8:30 AM, with two Junkers Ju 188 pathfinders leading. With the secrecy surrounding the mission very few were aware of their objectives. At a height of 400 feet they passed over Koblenz.

Over Aachen, liberated by the U.S. Army in October 1944, flak burst around them, hitting the Fw 190 of Oberleutnant Hans Fielder, adjutant of III./JG 11. He had rejoined his group the previous day from Göttingen, force-landing on 23 December due to engine trouble, and was grounded. He was not expecting to participate in this operation but had to fly with a brand new Fw 190A-8 as the wingman for Oberleutnant Grosser, Staffelkapitän of 11./JG 11. A lone P-47 shot at him and a result of both flak hits and P-47 fire Fielder was wounded in the head and forced to crash-land becoming a POW. Unteroffizier Ernst Noreisch was shot down and killed.

===== Legend of Y-29 =====
At 8:42 AM Captain Eber E. Simpson was leading the 391st squadron on a mission to bomb German tanks near St. Vith. They ran into two Bf 109s south of Malmedy with Lieutenants John F. Bathurst and Donald G. Holt claiming one each.

At 9:10 AM Lieutenant Colonel John C. Meyer of 487th Fighter Squadron (352 FG) was preparing for takeoff in "Petie III" P-51 Mustang with 11 others. As he lifted off he noticed flak bursts over Ophoven and one Fw 190 heading straight at him, piloted by Gefreiter Böhm intent on strafing a C-47 Skytrain transport. Meyer had not retracted his landing gear when he fired at the Fw 190 which cartwheeled and exploded next to the C-47. Despite the attack other P-51s were able to take off and JG 11 soon lost eight pilots. Obergefreiter Karlheinz Sistenich, Feldwebel Harald Scharz, Feldwebel Herbert Kraschinski, Oberleutnant August Engel all died, while Feldwebel Karl Miller was severely burnt after crash landing. There was one casualty among Allied ground crew. The U.S. flak crews held fire for fear of hitting a friendly aircraft and Allied pilots were cautious of firing at low flying 109s to avoid strafing the base. Flak crews hit one chasing P-51 which had to land damaged.

By 9:15 AM eight P-47s of 366th FG "Red" and "Yellow" flights were preparing for armed reconnaissance over Ardennes. "Red" flight consisted of Captain Lowell B. Smith with Lieutenants John Kennedy, Melvin R. Paisley and Flight Officer Dave Johnson. "Yellow" flight included Lieutenants John Feeny, Robert V. Brulle, Currie Davis and Joe Lackey. Kennedy noticed flak bursts to the northeast, and Red flight discovered JG 11 strafing the base at Ophoven with 50 JG 11 fighters heading back to their own base. Intent on strafing parked aircraft the German pilots did not notice the P-47s.

Lieutenant Paisley hit a Bf 109 using an underwing rocket and downed two more using gunfire. Smith and Brulle both shot one down, Brulle damaging another before running out of ammunition. Feeny and Lackey also shot down JG 11 aircraft. Six 352 FG pilots claimed multiple victories. Captain William T. "Whiz" Whisner and Lieutenant Sanford K. Moats claimed four each, with Captain Henry M. Stewart II and Lieutenant Alden P. Rigby claiming three each. Meyer and Lieutenant Ray Littge claimed two apiece while Whisner's wingman Lieutenant Walker G. Diamond and Meyer's wingman Lieutenant Alex F. Sears claimed one each.

The air battle of Asch, later known as the "Legend of Y-29", was a disaster for JG 11. U.S. fighters claimed 30 German fighters while JG 11 lost 28 aircraft (from 65). 25 pilots were killed. 5./JG 11 was the only unit that returned unscathed, though all the aircraft were damaged. III./JG 11 lost six pilots including Major Vowinkel. Some 40 percent of the JG 11 pilots died in the operation. At Asch four P-51s were shot down in the attack but the pilots survived. One P-47 and one P-51 were shot up on the ground.

===== Other Allied Engagements =====
Over Ophoven Airfield, a Spitfire of No. 610 Squadron flown by Australian Flight Lieutenant A.F.O. "Tony" Gaze took off but was shot at by P-51s chasing JG 11. He however shot down one Fw 190.

At Ophoven JG 11 were able to shoot up several Spitfires of No. 125 Wing RAF with seven fighters of No. 350 Squadron RAF destroyed along with several C-47 Dakotas. Buildings were also strafed. Although the flak crews claimed eight to ten aircraft downed several claims were duplicated by Allied pilots and flak crews, total claims being 42. III./JG 11 strafed for 45 minutes taking heavy losses. Unteroffizier Kurt Nüssle, Unteroffizier Hermann Barion and Feldwebel Peter Reschke were all shot down and killed, with Oberfeldwebel Franz Meindl listed as missing.

Also among the pilots killed was Major Specht. Specht received the Oak Leaves to his Knight's Cross after his death. Paisley's wingman Johnson claimed two German fighters shot down but his aircraft was heavily damaged from return fire. Bailing out he landed in a field near Asch. A Bf 109 had "belly landed" not far from the field and he went to inspect it, riding a borrowed bicycle. The Bf 109 was still intact but the pilot was dead. Johnson claimed that the pilot's identification card named him as a Lieutenant Colonel (German: Oberstleutnant) Specht. The claim has been disproved by German records that indicate Specht flew a Fw 190 (Werknummber 205033—factory number), and that he was a Major. Johnson's actual victim that day was Oberleutnant August Engel. Hauptmann Horst-Günther von Fassong, commander of III./JG 11, also went missing near Opglabbeek shot down by P-47s.^{[a]}

==== Defense of the Reich January–May 1945 ====
A severely weakened JG 11 faced Hawker Tempests of No. 3 and 486 Squadrons on 14 January 1945. With the Allied fighters trying to keep the German fighters away from the Saar region, other Geschwader joined JG 11 and JG 11 lost two pilots in the engagement. JG 11 was finally ordered to move to the Eastern Front in Poland on 23 January 1945.

Specht's successor as JG 11 Kommodore was Jürgen Harder, formerly Gruppenkommandeur of I./JG 53. He died on 17 February 1945 near Berlin, crashing due to oxygen failure. On 24 April 1945, five pilots were killed in action, including Unteroffizier Willi Kleemann who was killed in battle with Spitfires, P-51s and Yaks over Tempelhof, Germany. The unit surrendered to the British forces in early May 1945.

== Bomber interception tactics of JG 11 ==
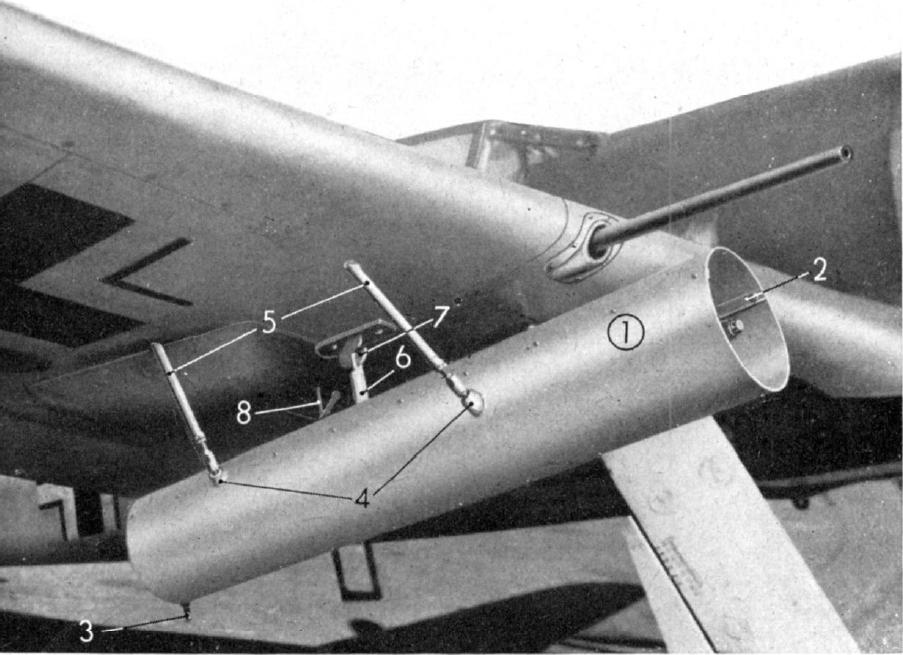
Picture from the Technical Specifications of underwing mortar WGr 21.

As JG 11 formed in 1943 the bombers of Eighth Air Force were starting to extend their bombing operations, and JG 11 pilots avoided combat until the escorts were forced to break off.

As a means of combating the massed firepower of bomber streams, JG 11 personnel trialed the viability of bombing the formations from above with 250 kg bombs, a practice pioneered by Luftwaffe Oberleutnant Heinz Knoke in March 1943. On 28 July 1943 Unteroffizier Fest of 5./JG 11 claimed three B-17's with a single bomb. However the loss in performance of the bomb-laden Bf 109's, along with their vulnerability to escorting fighters, soon curtailed the practice. 5./JG 11 were at the forefront of tactical developments for effectively intercepting the day bomber formations. The most effective tactic were mass frontal assaults, while other methods trialed were the use of the aforementioned BR 21 heavy-calibre rocket ordnance. These were inaccurate but were used primarily to break up the bomber formations.

== Notable successes and losses ==
Several 'Bomber-killer' Aces (German: Experten) were among the veterans of II./JG 11. Hauptmann Gerhard Sommer of 4./JG 11 claimed 10 heavy bombers and Oberleutnant Heinz Knoke of 5./JG 11 claimed 12 victories by the end of 1943. Knoke's 5./JG 11 claimed as many heavy bombers as the other two Staffeln put together. This prompted 5./JG 11 to consider themselves as experts versus heavy bombers (German: Viermot Experten).

Like its sister units engaged in Reich defense, JG 11 suffered heavy casualties in both pilots and aircraft. Many of the pilots killed were highly experienced and irreplaceable Experten. Hauptmann Hugo Frey (32 claims, including 26 heavy bombers, killed 8 March 1944), Hauptmann Gerhardt Sommer (20 claims, 15 heavy bombers, killed 12 May 1944) and Feldwebel Wilhelm Fest (15 claims, 8 confirmed victories May 1944) were just three of JG 11's best aces to fall.

In April 1944 Staffelkapitän of 10./JG 51, Leutnant Horst-Günther von Fassong, was transferred to lead 7./JG 11. He was credited with 62 victories on the Eastern Front at the time. He added several B-17s in the next month before promotion to Gruppenkommandeur of III./JG 11. Von Fassong died on 1 January 1945 during Operation Baseplate, and his aircraft cartwheeled after attack by two P-47 Thunderbolts. Another major casualty of Operation Baseplate was Geschwaderkommodore Specht.

On 9 July 1944 Hackl was the 78th recipient of the Knight's Cross of the Iron Cross with Oak Leaves and Swords (German: Ritterkreuz des Eisernen Kreuzes mit Eichenlaub und Schwertern), following his 150th victory.

== Commanding officers ==
=== Wing commanders ===
The list below provides its Geschwaderkommodores until its dissolution.

• Major Anton Mader	1 April 1943	–	November 1943
• Oberstleutnant Hermann Graf	11 November 1943	–	29 March 1944
• Major Anton Hackl (acting)	April 1944	–	15 April 1944
• Major Herbert Ihlefeld	1 May 1944	–	May 1944
• Major Günther Specht	15 May 1944	–	1 January 1945 †
• Major Jürgen Harder	January 1945	–	17 February 1945 †
• Major Anton Hackl	20 February 1945	–	5 May 1945

=== Group commanders ===
I. Gruppe of JG 11

• Major Walter Spies	1 April 1943	–	June 1943
• Hauptmann Erwin Clausen	20 June 1943	–	4 October 1943 †
• Hauptmann Erich Woitke (acting)	4 October 1943	–	15 October 1943
• Hauptmann Rolf Hermichen	16 October 1943	–	May 1944
• Oberleutnant Hans-Heinrich Koenig	May 1944	–	24 May 1944 †
• Oberleutnant Fritz Engau (acting)	24 May 1944	–	1 June 1944
• Hauptmann Siegfried Simsch	1 June 1944	–	8 June 1944 †
• Oberleutnant Fritz Engau (acting)	8 June 1944	–	24 June 1944
• Hauptmann Werner Langemann	24 June 1944	–	14 July 1944
• Hauptmann Walter Matoni	15 August 1944	–	30 September 1944
• Hauptmann Bruno Stolle	October 1944	–	25 November 1944
• Hauptmann Rüdiger Kirchmayr	25 November 1944	–	April 1945
• Hauptmann Karl Leonhard	April 1945	–	5 May 1945

II. Gruppe of JG 11

• Hauptmann Günther Beise	1 April 1943	–	15 April 1943
• Major Adolf Dickfeld	15 April 1943	–	May 1943
• Hauptmann Günther Specht	May 1943	–	15 April 1944
• Major Günther Rall	19 April 1944	–	12 May 1944
• Hauptmann Walter Krupinski	May 1944	–	12 August 1944
• Hauptmann Karl Leonhard	13 August 1944	–	5 April 1945

III. Gruppe of JG 11

• Hauptmann Ernst-Günther Heinze	April 1943	–	September 1943
• Major Anton Hackl	1 October 1943	–	May 1944
• Hauptmann Horst-Günther von Fassong	May 1944	–	1 January 1945 †
• Oberleutnant Paul-Heinrich Dähne	2 January 1945	–	February 1945
• Hauptmann Herbert Kutscha	23 February 1945	–	5 May 1945

== See also ==
- Oil Campaign of World War II
- Organization of the Luftwaffe during World War II

== Notes ==
=== Footnotes ===
- ^{a} The similar but differing meaning of Oberleutnant and Oberstleutnant may have contributed to the misunderstanding. It is not clear whether Johnson himself said Specht's name was on the ID card. Johnson died in 1976 and the authors were unable to confirm this.
- ^{b} It is not known if those three claims were confirmed or not.
- ^{[c]} Lennartz's claim has not been confirmed by allied records.
