= Heinrich Klöpper =

German fighter ace and Knight's Cross recipient (1918–1943)

- Born: 9 January 1918; Groß Bülten, Kingdom of Prussia, German Empire
- Died: 29 November 1943 (aged 25); Vollenhove, Netherlands
- Military career
- Allegiance: Nazi Germany
- Branch: Luftwaffe
- Service years: 1939–1943
- Rank: Oberleutnant (first lieutenant)
- Units: JG 77, JG 51, JG 2, JG 1
- Commands: 7./JG 1
- Conflicts: World War II: Eastern Front; Western Front; Battle of France; Battle of Britain; Operation Barbarossa; Defence of the Reich
- Awards: Knight's Cross of the Iron Cross

Heinrich (Heinz) Klöpper (9 January 1918 – 29 November 1943) was a former Luftwaffe fighter ace and recipient of the Knight's Cross of the Iron Cross during World War II. Heinrich Klöpper was credited with 94 victories.

== Career ==
Klöpper was born on 9 January 1918 in Größ Bülten, present-day part of Ilsede, at the time in the Province of Hanover within the German Empire.

In 1940 Heinrich (Heinz) Klöpper served with Jagdgeschwader 77 (JG 77—77th Fighter Wing), during the Battle of France and the Battle of Britain he recorded his first two victories. On 15 May, elements of 2. Staffel of JG 77 engaged five Armée de l'air Morane-Saulnier M.S.406 fighters west of Dinant. During this encounter, Klöpper claimed a M.S.406 fighter shot down, which was not confirmed, but was himself shot down and had to bail out of his Messerschmitt Bf 109 E. He landed safely near the advancing German tanks.

On 21 November, I. Gruppe of JG 77 was redesignated and became the IV. Gruppe of Jagdgeschwader 51 (JG 51—51st Fighter Wing). In consequence, Klöpper's former 2. Staffel of JG 77 became 11. Staffel of JG 51.

On the first day of Operation Barbarossa, the German invasion of the Soviet Union on 22 June 1941, he claimed his first victory on the Eastern Front, when he shot down a Russian SB-3 bomber. On 27 October 1941 he claimed a double Soviet victory, shooting down two LaGG-3 fighters. Another double on 5 July 1942, an Il-2 and an I-16 Rata; and five victories on 7 July 1942. Another five victories on 4 August 1942; a MiG-3, a Pe-2 and three Il-2 ground-attack aircraft.

On 4 September 1942, Klöpper was awarded the Knight's Cross of the Iron Cross (Ritterkreuz des Eisernen Kreuzes) for 65 aerial victories claimed.

=== Defense of the Reich ===
In May 1943, Klöpper was appointed Staffelkapitän (squadron leader) of 7. Staffel of Jagdgeschwader 1 (JG 1—1st Fighter Wing). He succeeded Hauptmann Günther Specht who was transferred. On the Western Front his 91st victim was a B-17 bomber on 5 November 1943. His 92nd, was a P-38 Lightning fighter on 13 November 1943. His 93rd aerial victory was the Consolidated B-24 Liberator bomber, "Sack-Time Sally", claimed on 26 November 1943. His 94th and final victory was a P-38 at Hasselt claimed on 29 November 1943.

On 29 November 1943, Klöpper was killed in action following aerial combat with USAAF approximately 20 to 30 Lockheed P-38 Lightning fighters of the 55th Fighter Group, supported by few Republic P-47 Thunderbolt fighters. The combat occurred at an altitude of 9,000 meters (30,000 feet) in the area of Groningen, Leeuwarden and Meppel, ending over the Zuiderzee. Following this encounter, Klöpper crashed his Bf 109 G-6 (Werknummer 410 106—factory number) southwest of Meppel after flying through a low cloud cover.

== Summary of career ==
=== Aerial victory claims ===
During his career, he shot down a total of 94 enemy planes in approximately 500 combat missions (18 victories were on the Western Front), of which eight were four engined bombers and seven Il-2 Sturmoviks. Mathews and Foreman, authors of Luftwaffe Aces — Biographies and Victory Claims, researched the German Federal Archives and found records for 89 aerial victories, plus further one unconfirmed claim. This figure includes 80 claims on the Eastern Front and nine claims over the Western Allies, including four four-engined heavy bombers.

Victory claims were logged to a map-reference (PQ = Planquadrat), for example "PQ 05 Ost 0021". The Luftwaffe grid map (Jägermeldenetz) covered all of Europe, western Russia and North Africa and was composed of rectangles measuring 15 minutes of latitude by 30 minutes of longitude, an area of about 360 square miles (930 km^{2}). These sectors were then subdivided into 36 smaller units to give a location area 3 km × 4 km (1.9 mi × 2.5 mi) in size.

Chronicle of aerial victories
This and the ♠ (Ace of spades) indicates those aerial victories which made Klöpper an "ace-in-a-day", a term which designates a fighter pilot who has shot down five or more airplanes in a single day. This and the – (dash) indicates unconfirmed aerial victory claims for which Klöpper did not receive credit. This and the ? (question mark) indicates information discrepancies listed by Prien, Stemmer, Rodeike, Bock, Mathews and Foreman.
Claim	Date	Time	Type	Location	Claim	Date	Time	Type	Location
– 2. Staffel of Jagdgeschwader 77 – Battle of France — 10 May – 1 June 1940
— (Note: This unconfirmed claim is not listed by Mathews and Foreman.)	15 May 1940	—	M.S.406						
– 2. Staffel of Jagdgeschwader 77 – Action at the Channel and over England — 25 August 1940 – 7 June 1941
1	5 October 1940	18:35	Spitfire	Dungeness					
– 11. Staffel of Jagdgeschwader 51 – Operation Barbarossa — 22 June – 5 December 1941
2	22 June 1941	16:25	SB-3	Mivhatki	15	13 August 1941	09:58	I-18 (MiG-1)	20 km (12 mi) north of Yelnya
3	24 June 1941	09:30	SB-3	5 km (3.1 mi) south of Siemieczewo	16	14 August 1941	15:30	I-18 (MiG-1)	4 km (2.5 mi) southeast of Yelnya
4	26 June 1941	10:48	DB-3		17	8 September 1941	05:40	I-18 (MiG-1)	5 km (3.1 mi) south of Snob
5	30 June 1941	13:15	R-10 (Seversky)	10 km (6.2 mi) west of Sauditsche	18	9 September 1941	12:50	R-3? (Note: According to Mathews and Foreman claimed as Ilyushin Il-2.)	15 km (9.3 mi) southwest of Krolowetz
6	11 July 1941	10:32	Pe-2	Kraschino	19	9 September 1941	14:40	DB-3	10 km (6.2 mi) west of Kostobobr
7	11 July 1941	15:35	I-16	Koely	20	9 September 1941	14:55	DB-3	20 km (12 mi) southeast of Novgorod
8	16 July 1941	10:14	DB-3	5 km (3.1 mi) east of Gusino	21	6 October 1941	13:20	Pe-2	15 km (9.3 mi) west of Spas-Demensk
9	26 July 1941	09:12	DB-3	15 km (9.3 mi) east of Kowali	22	6 October 1941	17:00	I-18 (MiG-1)	20 km (12 mi) north of Yukhnov
10	4 August 1941	08:30	Pe-2	5 km (3.1 mi) south of Alekssino	23	12 October 1941	16:05	I-18 (MiG-1)	15 km (9.3 mi) east of Kremensloje
11	8 August 1941	05:10	Pe-2	10 km (6.2 mi) northeast of Kochany	24	27 October 1941	15:20	Yak-1? (Note: According to Mathews and Foreman claimed as Lavochkin-Gorbunov-Gudkov LaGG-3.)	15 km (9.3 mi) northeast of Weretja
12	9 August 1941	11:20	SB-3	5 km (3.1 mi) north of Sacharjoskaja	25	27 October 1941	15:23	Yak-1?	15 km (9.3 mi) northeast of Weretja
13	9 August 1941	18:20	I-16	25 km (16 mi) northwest of Bryansk	26	29 October 1941	13:40	I-16	15 km (9.3 mi) southeast of Moshaisk
14	9 August 1941	18:55	Pe-2	southern edge of Dankowo					
– 11. Staffel of Jagdgeschwader 51 "Mölders" – Eastern Front — 1 May 1942 – 3 February 1943
27	29 May 1942	13:25	LaGG-3	15 km (9.3 mi) south of Batischtschewo	55	5 August 1942	11:35	MiG-3	18 km (11 mi) northeast of Zubtsov
28	4 June 1942	15:10	MiG-3	20 km (12 mi) northeast of Batischtschewo	56	9 August 1942	06:00	LaGG-3	10 km (6.2 mi) southeast of Zubtsov
29	13 June 1942	12:35	MiG-3		57	9 August 1942	12:10	Hurricane	15 km (9.3 mi) south-southwest of Zubtsov
30	5 July 1942	11:30	I-16? (Note: According to Mathews and Foreman claimed as Ilyushin Il-2.)	10 km (6.2 mi) northwest of Bjeloj	58	9 August 1942	12:12	Hurricane	15 km (9.3 mi) south of Zubtsov
31	5 July 1942	11:45	I-16	15 km (9.3 mi) northwest of Bjeloj	—	5 August 1942	—	LaGG-3	20 km (12 mi) south of Zubtsov
32♠	7 July 1942	13:30	LaGG-3	5 km (3.1 mi) south-southeast of Simnizy	59	10 August 1942	07:50	LaGG-3	7 km (4.3 mi) south-southeast of Zubtsov
33♠	7 July 1942	13:40	LaGG-3	3 km (1.9 mi) west of Simnizy	60	18 August 1942	17:00	LaGG-3	7 km (4.3 mi) northeast of Wassilijeswkoje; 40 km (25 mi) south-southeast of Gagarin
34♠	7 July 1942	16:55	MiG-3	eastern edge of Kosjoslk	61	19 August 1942	14:25	LaGG-3	18 km (11 mi) northwest of Rzhev
35♠	7 July 1942	17:10	MiG-3	12 km (7.5 mi) northwest of Belew	62	23 August 1942	18:00	MiG-3	6 km (3.7 mi) southwest of Zubtsov
36♠	7 July 1942	17:16	MiG-3	5 km (3.1 mi) east of Belew	63	23 August 1942	18:15	Il-2	10 km (6.2 mi) east of Rzhev
37	11 July 1942	05:52	LaGG-3	5 km (3.1 mi) southwest of Simnizy	64	24 August 1942	07:30	Il-2	3 km (1.9 mi) southeast of Rzhev
38	11 July 1942	05:53	LaGG-3	2 km (1.2 mi) south of Simnizy	65	24 August 1942	12:17	P-39	5 km (3.1 mi) east of Zubtsov
39	11 July 1942	05:57	LaGG-3	10 km (6.2 mi) southeast of Simnizy	66	25 August 1942	06:40	LaGG-3	12 km (7.5 mi) northwest of Rzhev
40	11 July 1942	19:45	LaGG-3	25 km (16 mi) north-northwest of Zhizdra	67	28 October 1942	14:20	MiG-3	25 km (16 mi) southwest of Staraya Toropa
41	13 July 1942	16:02	MiG-3	25 km (16 mi) west of Suchinitschi	68	28 October 1942	15:03	Yak-1	5 km (3.1 mi) northeast of Uswjaty
42	27 July 1942	06:00	LaGG-3	1 km (0.62 mi) east of Mozhaysk	69	29 October 1942	15:15	MiG-3	25 km (16 mi) east of Vitebsk southeast of Vitebsk
43	1 August 1942	11:07	LaGG-3	14 km (8.7 mi) northwest of Rzhev	70	29 October 1942	15:20	MiG-3	25 km (16 mi) southeast of Surazh southeast of Surazh
44	1 August 1942	11:15	Il-2	20 km (12 mi) southeast of Rzhev	71	30 October 1942	10:15	MiG-3	25 km (16 mi) southeast of Vitebsk southeast of Vitebsk
45	1 August 1942	11:21? (Note: According to Mathews and Foreman claimed at 11:22.)	U-2	20 km (12 mi) south of Rzhev	72	30 October 1942	10:20	MiG-3	28 km (17 mi) southeast of Vitebsk southeast of Vitebsk
46	2 August 1942	14:45	MiG-3	10 km (6.2 mi) northwest of Rzhev	73	30 October 1942	10:33? (Note: According to Mathews and Foreman claimed at 10:38.)	MiG-3	8 km (5.0 mi) northeast of Surazh northeast of Surazh
47	3 August 1942	09:20	LaGG-3	10 km (6.2 mi) northeast of Rzhev	74	7 November 1942	12:20	MiG-3	25 km (16 mi) southwest of Staraya Toropa; 25 km (16 mi) west-southwest of Staraya Toropa
48	3 August 1942	10:00	MiG-3	15 km (9.3 mi) northwest of Rzhev	75♠	9 November 1942	07:32	Pe-2	35 km (22 mi) northeast of Welish; 15 km (9.3 mi) northeast of Maklok
49♠	4 August 1942	05:20	Pe-2	15 km (9.3 mi) northeast of Zubtsov	76♠	9 November 1942	07:41	MiG-3	27 km (17 mi) southwest of Staraya Toropa; 30 km (19 mi) southwest of Staraya Toropa
50♠	4 August 1942	05:25	Il-2	15 km (9.3 mi) east of Zubtsov	77♠	9 November 1942	07:43	MiG-3	39 km (24 mi) southwest of Staraya Toropa; 40 km (25 mi) west-southwest of Staraya Toropa
51♠	4 August 1942	05:27	Il-2	18 km (11 mi) southeast of Zubtsov	78♠	9 November 1942	07:45? (Note: According to Mathews and Foreman claimed at 07:50.)	MiG-3	20 km (12 mi) southwest of Staraya Toropa; 15 km (9.3 mi) southwest of Staraya Toropa
52♠	4 August 1942	15:25	MiG-3	18 km (11 mi) east of Zubtsov	79♠	9 November 1942	08:10	MiG-3	40 km (25 mi) southwest of Staraya Toropa; 40 km (25 mi) west-southwest of Staraya Toropa
53♠	4 August 1942	18:35	Il-2	7 km (4.3 mi) southeast of Zubtsov	80	11 November 1942	12:16	MiG-3	30 km (19 mi) southwest of Staraya Toropa
54	5 August 1942	11:30	MiG-3	15 km (9.3 mi) east of Zubtsov	81	11 November 1942	12:18	MiG-3	11 km (6.8 mi) southwest of Staraya Toropa; 25 km (16 mi) west-southwest of Staraya Toropa
– 3. Staffel of Jagdgeschwader 2 "Richthofen" – Western Front — 1 January – April 1943
82? (Note: This claim is not listed by Mathews and Foreman.)	17 January 1943	15:32	Spitfire	PQ 05 Ost 0021	84	13 March 1943? (Note: According to Mathews and Foreman claimed ao 23 March 1943.)	15:30	Spitfire	30 km (19 mi) west of Baie de Somme; 50 km (31 mi) northwest of Abbeville
83	10 February 1943	11:21	Spitfire	Orne estuary	85	28 March 1943	12:31	Spitfire	south of Beachy Head; 100 km (62 mi) northeast of Dieppe
– 7. Staffel of Jagdgeschwader 1 – Western Front — May – 29 November 1943
According to Prien, Stemmer, Rodeike and Bock, Klöpper claimed one undocumented aerial victory in the timeframe 16 August to 30 September 1943. This claim is not listed by Mathews and Foreman.
87	10 October 1943	15:19	B-17	22 km (14 mi) northeast of Münster					
According to Prien, Stemmer, Rodeike and Bock, Klöpper claimed one undocumented aerial victory in the timeframe 11 to 31 October 1943. This claim is not listed by Mathews and Foreman.
89	3 November 1943	13:10	B-17	Mellum	91	26 November 1943	13:10	B-24	PQ 05 Ost S/DN-4 vicinity of Hasselt
90	5 November 1943	13:54	B-17	PQ 05 Ost S/KH-1 vicinity of Haamstede	92	29 November 1943	14:15	P-38	PQ 05 Ost S/FN-4/5

=== Awards ===
- Wound Badge in Black (25 June 1943)
- Front Flying Clasp of the Luftwaffe in Gold with Pennant
- Iron Cross (1939) 2nd and 1st Class
- Honor Goblet of the Luftwaffe on 20 October 1941 as Feldwebel in a Jagdgeschwader
- German Cross in Gold on 21 August 1942 as Oberfeldwebel in the VI./Jagdgeschwader 51
- Knight's Cross of the Iron Cross on 4 September 1942 as Oberfeldwebel and pilot in the 11./Jagdgeschwader 51 "Mölders"
