= Adolf Dickfeld =

German World War II flying ace

- Adolf Dickfeld
- Born: 20 February 1910; Jüterbog, Kingdom of Prussia, German Empire
- Died: 17 May 2009 (aged 99); Dreieich, Germany
- Military career
- Allegiance: Nazi Germany
- Branch: Luftwaffe
- Service years: 1939–1945
- Rank: Oberst (colonel)
- Units: JG 52, JG 2, JG 11
- Commands: II./JG 11
- Conflicts: See battles World War II: Battle of France; Battle of Britain; Mediterranean Theatre; North African campaign; Eastern Front; Defense of the Reich
- Awards: Knight's Cross of the Iron Cross with Oak Leaves

Adolf Dickfeld (20 February 1910 – 17 May 2009) was a German Luftwaffe military aviator during World War II, an ace credited with 136 enemy aircraft shot down in about 1,072 combat missions. He was also a recipient of the Knight's Cross of the Iron Cross with Oak Leaves. He was "ace-in-a-day" four times, shooting down five or more aircraft on a single day.

== Early life and career ==
Dickfeld was born on 20 February 1910 in Jüterbog in the Province of Brandenburg, the son of an artillery officer. In his youth he learned to fly glider aircraft. He made his first flights at the glider school in Grunau in Silesia, present-day Jeżów Sudecki, Poland. Here, among others, he was taught to fly by Hanna Reitsch. He was also trained by Wolf Hirth on the Hornberg in the Black Forest, and by Heini Dittmar and Oskar Ursinus at the Wasserkuppe in the Rhön Mountains.

After attending school and passing his Abitur (School Leaving Certificate), Dickfeld attended the flight school at Frankfurt (Oder) from 3 September to 23 December 1934, receiving his A-license for motor powered aircraft. (Note: Flight training in the Luftwaffe progressed through the levels A1, A2 and B1, B2, referred to as A/B flight training. A training included theoretical and practical training in aerobatics, navigation, long-distance flights and dead-stick landings. The B courses included high-altitude flights, instrument flights, night landings and training to handle the aircraft in difficult situations.) He then received the B-license at the flight school in Stolp, present-day Słupsk, after completing a course from 2 January to 28 February 1935. On 3 March, he continued his training at the flight school in Hagenow, a course with emphasis on aerobatics which he completed in June 1935.

From 2 July 1935 to 28 February 1937, Dickfeld was based at the Deutsche Verkehrsfliegerschule, a covert military-training organization, under the command of Alfred Keller in Braunschweig. There, he received further training and became an instrument flight instructor. In parallel, Dickfeld participated three times in the Deutschlandflug, a cross-country flight contest for pilots, and various other aviation contests. He also trained in the military reserve force of the newly emerging Luftwaffe. Dickfeld studied radio technology before officially joining the Luftwaffe on 1 January 1939, where he served in aerial reconnaissance.

== World War II ==
World War II in Europe had begun on Friday, 1 September 1939, when German forces invaded Poland. Dickfeld was transferred to II. Gruppe (2nd Group) of Jagdgeschwader 52 (JG 52—52nd Fighter Wing) on 28 October 1939 and was promoted to Leutnant der Reserve (second lieutenant of the reserves) on 1 December 1939. He received the Iron Cross 2nd Class (Eisernes Kreuz 2. Klasse) on 13 December and the Iron Cross 1st Class (Eisernes Kreuz 1. Klasse) on 12 January 1940, both during the Phoney War period in protection of Germany's western border.

In 1940, Dickfeld flew missions during the Battle of France and Britain. He was then posted to a Luftwaffe training battalion as a company commander and on 21 February 1941, he was made a war office candidate. He was the posted to the Stab (headquarters unit) of JG 52. On 15 May, III./JG 52 was moved to Athens and together with other Luftwaffe units, flews its first combat missions in support of the Battle of Crete. During this campaign, Dickfeld flew multiple missions against Greek forces and other Allied forces.

=== Eastern Front ===
Following its brief deployment in the Balkan Campaign, III. Gruppe was ordered to Bucharest by mid-June. There, the unit was subordinated to the Luftwaffenmission Rumänien (Luftwaffe Mission Romania) and reequipped with the new, more powerful Messerschmitt Bf 109 F-4 model. On 21 June 1941, the Gruppe was ordered to Mizil in preparation of Operation Barbarossa, the German invasion of the Soviet Union. Its primary objective was to provide fighter protection for the oil fields and refineries at Ploiești. The invasion of the Soviet Union began on 22 June. The next day, the Gruppe moved to Mamaia, the northern district of Constanța on the Black Sea coast. There, Dickfeld claimed his first two aerial victories on 26 June. He was credited with shooting down a Soviet Ilyushin DB-3 bomber and a Tupolev SB bomber in the morning.

The Gruppe moved to Belaya Tserkov on 1 August during the Battle of Kiev and also used an airfield at Yampil from 6 to 8 August. In August. Dickfeld increased his number of aerial victories to ten, claiming three Soviet fighters on 4 August, one on 11 August, another on 14 August, and two Polikarpov I-16 fighters on 16 August.

On 23 October, III. Gruppe moved from Poltava to Chaplynka. The following day, Dickfeld became an "ace-in-a-day" for the first time when shot down five Soviet Polikarpov I-15 fighter aircraft near Ishun.

On 19 March 1942, Dickefeld together with fellow JG 52 pilot Feldwebel Edmund Roßmann were awarded the Knight's Cross of the Iron Cross (Ritterkreuz des Eisernen Kreuzes). On 29 April, III. Gruppe had relocated to Zürichtal, a small village at the Inhul in the former German settlement west of Feodosia in the Crimea during the Crimean campaign. On 1 May, the Gruppe was subordinated to VIII. Fliegerkorps and was supporting the 11th Army in the Battle of the Kerch Peninsula and the Siege of Sevastopol. There, Dickfeld claimed eleven aerial victories on 8 May making him a "double-ace-in-a-day", taking his total to 73 aerial victories.

According to Obermaier, Dickfeld was credited with his 100th aerial victory on 18 May 1942. He was the 8th Luftwaffe pilot to achieve the century mark. That day, he was awarded the Knight's Cross of the Iron Cross with Oak Leaves (Ritterkreuz des Eisernen Kreuzes mit Eichenlaub). He was the 94th member of the German armed forces to be so honored. The presentation was made by Adolf Hitler at the Wolf's Lair, Hitler's headquarters in Rastenburg on 25 May.

=== North Africa ===
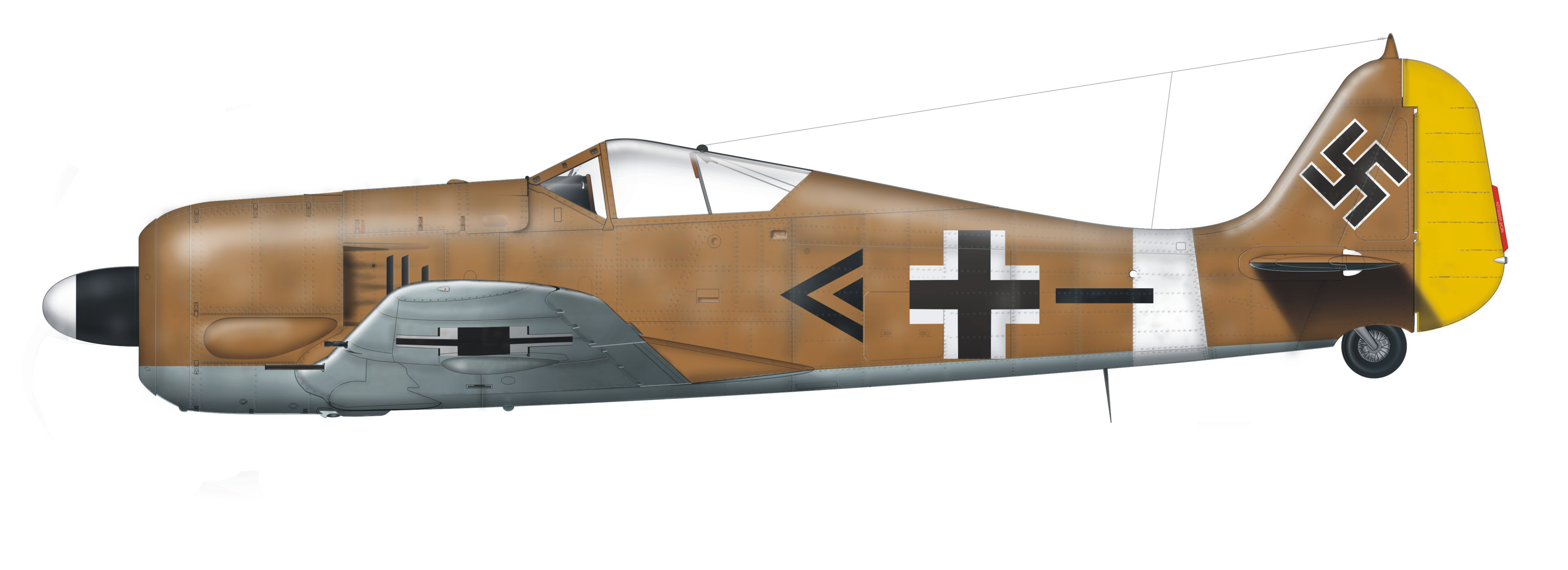
Fw 190 A-4 of II./JG 2, flown by group commander Dickfeld, Tunisia 1943

In early November 1942, the Western Allies launched Operation Torch, the Anglo–American invasion of French North Africa. On 17 November, II. Gruppe of JG 2 was withdrawn from the English Channel Front and ordered to San Pietro Clarenza, Sicily. At the time, the Gruppe was equipped with the Focke-Wulf Fw 190 A-3, some Fw 190 A-2s, and received the A-4 variant in early December. This made II. Gruppe of JG 2 the only Fw 190 equipped fighter unit in the Mediterranean Theater. The Gruppe flew its first missions on 19 November, securing German air and sea transportation to Tunis. That day, elements of II. Gruppe began relocating to Bizerte Airfield. On 8 January 1943 during an emergency takeoff, Dickfeld crashed his Fw 190 A-4 (Werknummer 0750—factory number) by running into a bomb crater. The aircraft summersaulted and Dickfeld was injured. Command of II. Gruppe of JG 2 was briefly passed to Oberleutnant Erich Rudorffer.

On 15 April, Dickfeld was appointed Gruppenkommandeur of II. Gruppe of Jagdgeschwader 11 (JG 11—11h Fighter Wing), an office he held until May when he transferred command to Hauptmann Günther Specht. He was transferred to the Reich Air Ministry in December 1943. There, he was appointed Reichs-Inspekteur der Flieger Hitlerjugend (Reich inspector of the Aviation Hitler Youth). He was promoted to Oberstleutnant (lieutenant colonel) on 1 June 1944 and appointed General für Nachwuchs Luftwaffe (general of procreation/recruitment), a position he held until the end of World War II.

Dickfeld was officially credited with 136 victories claimed in 1072 combat missions. He also claimed a further 15 enemy aircraft unconfirmed. He claimed about 128 victories over the Eastern Front. He claimed one victory flying the Heinkel He 162 Salamander ("Volksjäger") jet fighter, a P-47 Thunderbolt on 11 April 1945.

== Later life ==
After the war in 1952, Dickfeld initiated the Association of Knight's Cross Recipients. He then lived in East Africa for many years and founded the safari-airline "Alf Air Safaris" in Dar es Salaam, flying tourists to the various African landmarks and points of interest. Dickfeld, who also published a number of books, died on 17 May 2009 in Dreieich, Germany.

== Summary of career ==
=== Aerial victory claims ===
According to US historian David T. Zabecki, Dickfeld was credited with 136 aerial victories. Spick also lists him with 136 aerial victories, 115 on the Eastern Front and 18 in North Africa and the Western Front, including 11 four engine bombers. Mathews and Foreman, authors of Luftwaffe Aces — Biographies and Victory Claims, researched the German Federal Archives and found records for 132 aerial victory claims, plus five further unconfirmed claims. This figure of confirmed claims includes 128 aerial victories on the Eastern Front and four Western Front, including two four-engine bombers.

Victory claims were logged to a map-reference (PQ = Planquadrat), for example "PQ 0512". The Luftwaffe grid map (Jägermeldenetz) covered all of Europe, western Russia and North Africa and was composed of rectangles measuring 15 minutes of latitude by 30 minutes of longitude, an area of about 360 square miles (930 km^{2}). These sectors were then subdivided into 36 smaller units to give a location area 3 km × 4 km (1.9 mi × 2.5 mi) in size.

Chronicle of aerial victories
This and the ♠ (Ace of spades) indicates those aerial victories which made Dickfeld an "ace-in-a-day", a term which designates a fighter pilot who has shot down five or more airplanes in a single day. This and the – (dash) indicates unconfirmed aerial victory claims for which Dickfeld did not receive credit. This and the ? (question mark) indicates information discrepancies listed by Prien, Stemmer, Rodeike, Bock, Mathews and Foreman.
Claim	Date	Time	Type	Location	Claim	Date	Time	Type	Location
– 7. Staffel of Jagdgeschwader 52 – Operation Barbarossa — 22 June – 5 December 1941
1	26 June 1941	04:30	DB-3	vicinity of Constanța	17♠	24 October 1941	12:42	I-15	vicinity of Ishun
2	26 June 1941	05:25	SB-2	vicinity of Constanța	18♠	24 October 1941	12:43	I-15	south of Ishun
3	21 July 1941	15:15	SB-2	Danube estuary near Sulina	19♠	24 October 1941	12:44	I-15	vicinity of Ishun
4	4 August 1941	14:28	I-153	Sulina	20♠	24 October 1941	12:46	I-15	vicinity of Ishun
5	4 August 1941	14:37	I-18 (MiG-1)		21	25 October 1941	15:20	Pe-2	south of Cape Takyl
6	4 August 1941	19:03	I-16		22	25 October 1941	15:24	I-61 (MiG-3)	south of Cape Takyl vicinity of Ishun
7	11 August 1941	12:23	I-16		23	25 October 1941	15:26	I-61 (MiG-3)	south of Cape Takyl
8	14 August 1941	10:42	I-16		—	30 October 1941	—	Yak-1	
9	16 August 1941	08:58? (Note: According to Mathews and Foreman claimed at 08:59.)	I-16	5 km (3.1 mi) southeast of Kiev	24	31 October 1941	15:20	I-61 (MiG-3)	10 km (6.2 mi) northeast of Sevastopol
10	16 August 1941	08:59? (Note: According to Mathews and Foreman claimed at 09:00.)	I-16	5 km (3.1 mi) southeast of Kiev	25	22 November 1941	14:27	I-26 (Yak-1)	
11	5 October 1941	15:03	I-153		26	23 November 1941	10:17	I-26 (Yak-1)	
12	5 October 1941	15:09	I-153		27	28 November 1941	10:29	I-26 (Yak-1)	
13	17 October 1941	07:18	I-26? (Note: According to Mathews and Foreman claimed as a Seversky.)		28	28 November 1941	10:35	I-26 (Yak-1)	
14	17 October 1941	07:23	I-26 (Yak-1)		29	28 November 1941	12:50	I-26 (Yak-1)	
15	17 October 1941	07:31	R-10 (Seversky)		30	3 December 1941	08:01	I-16	
16♠	24 October 1941	12:40	I-15	vicinity of Ishun	31	3 December 1941	08:01	I-16	
– 7. Staffel of Jagdgeschwader 52 – Eastern Front — 6 December 1941 – 28 April 1942
32	6 December 1941	08:18	I-16		41	17 February 1942	08:01	I-61 (MiG-3)	
33	6 December 1941	08:20	I-16		42	17 February 1942	08:03	I-61 (MiG-3)	
34	6 December 1941	13:50	I-16		43	17 February 1942	08:04	I-61 (MiG-3)	
35	6 December 1941	13:52	I-16		44	17 February 1942	10:31	I-61 (MiG-3)	
36	7 December 1941	08:20	I-26 (Yak-1)		45	17 February 1942	10:34	I-16	
37	9 December 1941	08:55	I-16		46	19 February 1942	08:24	I-61 (MiG-3)	
38	9 December 1941	08:59	I-16		47	19 February 1942	08:29	I-61 (MiG-3)	
39	11 December 1941	10:45	I-26 (Yak-1)		48	23 February 1942	11:40	I-61 (MiG-3)	
40	16 February 1942	15:01	I-61 (MiG-3)		49	23 February 1942	11:53	I-61 (MiG-3)	
– Stab III. Gruppe of Jagdgeschwader 52 – Eastern Front — 6 December 1941 – 28 April 1942
50	17 March 1942	—	I-16		53	22 March 1942	—	I-16	
51	17 March 1942	—	I-16		54	27 March 1942	10:31	R-5	Werchow-Roganskij
—	17 March 1942	—	I-16		55	27 March 1942	—	I-61 (MiG-3)	
52	18 March 1942	—	I-61 (MiG-3)						
– Stab III. Gruppe of Jagdgeschwader 52 – Eastern Front — 29 April 1942 – 3 February 1943
56	29 April 1942	—	Yak-1		66♠	8 May 1942	—	unknown	
57	30 April 1942	—	I-153		67♠	8 May 1942	—	unknown	
58	30 April 1942	—	I-16		68♠	8 May 1942	—	unknown	
59	1 May 1942	—	I-16		69♠	8 May 1942	—	unknown	
60	2 May 1942	—	unknown		70♠	8 May 1942	—	unknown	
61	5 May 1942	—	I-61 (MiG-3)		71♠	8 May 1942	—	unknown	
62	5 May 1942	—	I-16		72♠	8 May 1942	—	unknown	
63♠	8 May 1942	—	unknown		73♠	8 May 1942	—	unknown	
64♠	8 May 1942	—	unknown		74	9 May 1942	—	unknown	
65♠	8 May 1942	—	unknown						
– 8. Staffel of Jagdgeschwader 52 – Eastern Front — 29 April 1942 – 3 February 1943
75	12 May 1942	14:45	I-153		86♠	14 May 1942	12:11	MiG-1	
76♠	13 May 1942	10:15	I-16		87♠	14 May 1942	12:12	MiG-1	
77♠	13 May 1942	10:31	MiG-1	5 km (3.1 mi) east of Werch. Storganskij	88♠	14 May 1942	16:10	Yak-1	
78♠	13 May 1942	10:32	MiG-1		89♠	14 May 1942	16:44	Yak-1	
79♠	13 May 1942	10:33	MiG-1		—	14 May 1942	—	MiG-1	
80♠	13 May 1942	13:15	MiG-1		90	21 May 1942	18:35	MiG-1	
81♠	13 May 1942	13:18	MiG-1		91	23 May 1942	10:20	MiG-1	
82♠	14 May 1942	09:36	MiG-1	10 km (6.2 mi) east of Stary Saltov	92	26 May 1942	17:25	LaGG-3	
83♠	14 May 1942	09:41	MiG-1		93	26 May 1942	17:27	LaGG-3	
84♠	14 May 1942	09:45	MiG-1		94	27 May 1942	19:15	Su-2 (Seversky)	
85♠	14 May 1942	12:09	MiG-1						
– Stab III. Gruppe of Jagdgeschwader 52 – Eastern Front — 29 April 1942 – 3 February 1943
95	5 August 1942	16:30? (Note: According to Mathews and Foreman claimed at 16:13.)	MiG-1	PQ 0512	112	23 August 1942	07:42	LaGG-3	PQ 44411
96	6 August 1942	15:22	LaGG-3	PQ 0516	113	23 August 1942	07:44	Boston	PQ 44411
97	6 August 1942	15:40	I-153	PQ 0527	114	28 August 1942	08:45	LaGG-3	PQ 44464 south of Modok
98	13 August 1942	18:23	Boston	PQ 44351	115	28 August 1942	10:35	Boston	PQ 54322
99	14 August 1942	09:50	Boston	PQ 3425	116	30 August 1942	08:15	LaGG-3	PQ 54532 vicinity of Jelenskiy
100	14 August 1942	10:22	Boston	PQ 3441	117	30 August 1942	08:31	LaGG-3	PQ 54882; Maken Jurt
101	16 August 1942	15:40	LaGG-3	PQ 34492	118	30 August 1942	11:26	LaGG-3	PQ 54544, Arlenbokoskij vicinity of Jelenskiy
102	16 August 1942	15:46	Il-2	PQ 34494	119	30 August 1942	11:27	LaGG-3	PQ 54544, Arlenbokoskij vicinity of Jelenskiy
103	17 August 1942	07:48	LaGG-3	PQ 44381	120	2 September 1942	12:58	Su-2 (Seversky)	PQ 44442, south of Mozdok
104	17 August 1942	07:49	LaGG-3	PQ 44383	121	2 September 1942	13:03	Su-2 (Seversky)	PQ 44472 south of Mozdok
105	18 August 1942	13:18	LaGG-3	PQ 34644 southeast of Naltschik	122	4 September 1942	15:25	Boston	PQ 44372 south of Mozdok
106	18 August 1942	13:20	LaGG-3	PQ 34662 southeast of Naltschik	123	4 September 1942	16:43	LaGG-3	PQ 44452 south of Mozdok
107	18 August 1942	13:25	I-153	PQ 34484	124	5 September 1942	11:10	Boston	northeast of Mozdok
108	19 August 1942	08:18	LaGG-3	PQ 44541 southwest of Daiskoje	125	5 September 1942	11:12	LaGG-3	northeast of Mozdok vicinity of Wosnessnokaja
109	19 August 1942	14:18	I-153	PQ 34433, west of Altud	126	10 September 1942	16:05	Il-2	PQ 44423; Mozdok region
110	19 August 1942	14:30	LaGG-3	PQ 34452	127	10 September 1942	16:06	LaGG-3	1 km (0.62 mi) south of Malgobek
111	19 August 1942	14:40	LaGG-3? (Note: According to Mathews and Foreman claimed as a Polikarpov I-16.)	PQ 34621	128	17 September 1942	06:26	LaGG-3	PQ 54392; Maken Jurt
– Stab II. Gruppe of Jagdgeschwader 2 – Mediterranean Theater — 17 November – 31 December 1942
—	30 November 1942	09:30~	Bisley	vicinity of Bizerte	130	3 December 1942	11:47	P-38	10 km (6.2 mi) west Bizerte
129	1 December 1942	15:35	Spitfire	north of Tebourba					
– Stab II. Gruppe of Jagdgeschwader 11 – On the Western Front — 17 April – May 1943
131	17 April 1943	13:08	B-17	PQ 05 Ost S/84/6/1, near Stotel	132	15 May 1943	10:50	B-17	PQ 05 Ost 75/7/3
– Stab I. Gruppe of Jagdgeschwader "Hitler Jugend" –
—	21 April 1945	—	P-47	vicinity of Goslar					

=== Awards ===
- Iron Cross (1939)
  - 2nd Class (13 December 1939)
  - 1st Class (12 January 1940)
- Honour Goblet of the Luftwaffe on 15 December 1941 as Leutnant and pilot
- German Cross in Gold on 22 January 1942 as Leutnant of the Reserves in the 7./Jagdgeschwader 52
- Knight's Cross of the Iron Cross with Oak Leaves
  - Knight's Cross on 19 March 1942 as Leutnant (war officer) and pilot in the 7./Jagdgeschwader 52
  - 94th Oak Leaves on 19 May 1942 as Leutnant (war officer) and pilot in the 7./Jagdgeschwader 52 (Note: According to Scherzer on 18 May 1942)
- Royal Bulgarian Merit medal in Gold

== Publications ==
- Dickfeld, Adolf (1997). Im Schatten des Kilimandscharo [In the Shadow of Kilimanjaro] (in German). Koblenz, Germany: Verlag Siegfried Bublies. ISBN 978-3-926584-42-7.
- Dickfeld, Adolf (2005). Die Fährte des Jägers — Kriegerlebnisse eines Jagdfliegers [The Path of the Hunter — War Experiences of a Fighter Pilot] (in German). Schnellbach, Germany: Verlag Siegfried Bublies. ISBN 978-3-926584-37-3.
