= Heinz Knoke =

German politician (1921–1993)

- Born: 24 March 1921; Hamelin, Germany
- Died: 18 May 1993 (aged 72); Bad Iburg, Germany
- Military career
- Allegiance: Nazi Germany
- Branch: Luftwaffe
- Service years: 1939–45
- Rank: Hauptmann (captain)
- Nickname: "The Last Prussian"
- Units: JG 52, JG 1, JG 11
- Commands: III./JG 11
- Conflicts: World War II: Operation Barbarossa; Operation Cerberus; Defense of the Reich
- Awards: Knight's Cross of the Iron Cross

Heinz Knoke (24 March 1921 – 18 May 1993) was a World War II Luftwaffe flying ace. He is credited with 33 confirmed aerial victories, all claimed over the Western theatre of operations, and claimed a further 19 unconfirmed kills in over 2,000 flights (In Knoke's memoirs "I Flew for the Führer" he claims to have shot down 52 planes, as documented in the logbooks that were brought to him at the hospital). His total included 19 heavy bombers of the United States Army Air Forces (USAAF).

== Early life ==
Knoke was born the son of a policeman on 24 March 1921 in Hamelin. On 6 July 1938, whilst watching an air display, Knoke made his first flight, a fifteen-minute joy ride in an old transport aircraft and took the preliminary examination for entry into the Luftwaffe. On 15 November 1939, Knoke underwent flight training at No. 11 Flying Training Regiment Schonwald, near Berlin and in August 1940 attended Jagdfliegerschule 1 (Werneuchen) under instructor Flight Sergeant Kuhl, an experienced operational pilot who had already seen action in both the invasions of Poland and France.

== War career 1941–42 ==
In early 1941 Knoke received his first combat posting, joining Jagdgeschwader 52 (JG 52). Posted to II Gruppe under Hauptmann Erich Woitke, his comrades included the future aces Gerhard Barkhorn, Günther Rall and Walter Krupinski. After initial operations during the invasion of Soviet Russia in June 1941, Knoke was transferred to JG 1 in July 1941. On 28 August 1941 Heinz married Elisabeth "Lilo" Makowski in Schieratz.

In February 1942, Knoke participated with 3./JG 1 in Operation Donnerkeil, the Channel Dash of the German battleships Scharnhorst and Gneisenau and heavy cruiser Prinz Eugen.

On 14 February 1942 Knoke was detached to Jagdgruppe Losigkeit (Fritz Losigkeit), where he was charged with the air protection of these ships over the Norway coast. He returned to JG 1 in March. On 5 March he shared in shooting down a Royal Air Force (RAF) Supermarine Spitfire of No. 1 Photo Reconnaissance Unit (PRU), RAF. Its pilot, Flight Lieutenant Sandy Gunn, was taken prisoner. Gunn later participated in the Great Escape, and was one of those killed by the Gestapo after being recaptured. In October 1942 Knoke became Commanding officer of 2nd Staffel, JG 1. He claimed his solo first kill on 31 October, an RAF Bristol Blenheim.

== Against the USAAF 1943–44 ==
As the USAAF daylight bomber offensive increased steadily in intensity throughout 1943, so did operations by the defending JG 1 and JG 11. Knoke destroyed his first "heavy" on his 164th operation: Maisie, a B-24 Liberator of the 44th Bombardment Group, which he shot down over Zwischenahn on 26 February 1943 – two of the crew survived; journalist Robert Post, who on the first and last mission of "The Writing 69th", was among those killed.

The problem of attacking heavily armed bombers occupied the minds of the Luftwaffe in early 1943. Oberleutnant Heinz Knoke and his friend, Leutnant Dieter Gerhardt (killed in action against B-24s on 18 March 1943), developed the idea of dropping aerial bombs as a means to break up the tight combat boxes, thereby compromising the defensively strong USAAF bomber formations and rendering individual aircraft more vulnerable.

Knoke claimed his fifth victory, a B-24 of the 93rd Bomb Group on 18 March over Helgoland. On 22 March, Knoke successfully downed the B-17 Flying Fortress Liberty Bell, of the 91st Bombardment Group, with a 250 kg bomb, intercepting it on its return flight after attacking Wilhelmshaven. The B-17 fell into the North Sea 30 kilometres (19 mi) west of Helgoland; all of the crew were killed. He thus became the first of very few fighter pilots in aviation history to destroy an enemy aircraft with a bomb. The Luftwaffe soon curtailed this practice, however as the carriage of bombs severely affected high altitude performance of the Messerschmitt Bf 109G and made these aircraft vulnerable to any escorting fighters.

In April 1943 I./JG 1 became II gruppe of the newly formed Jagdgeschwader 11 (JG 11), Knoke's 2 Staffel becoming 5./JG 11. During 1943 Knoke claimed some 17 kills, the majority B-17s and B-24s of the USAAF. Another B-17 (of the 95th Bomb Group) was downed on 11 June. Later that month, (on the 25th), Knoke was wounded in the hand by return fire from a bomber, resulting in the amputation of part of his thumb. On 17 August 1943 while intercepting a raid on Regensburg he was again wounded, this time by shrapnel fragments, and his aircraft was damaged by bomber return fire. Knoke belly landed near Bonn, his Bf 109G-6 was written off.

On 27 September 1943, Knoke shot down a B-17, Elusive Elcy, of the 94th Bomb Group using Werfer-Granate 21 unguided rockets launched from modified mortar tubes. Encountering USAAF escort fighters for the first time, he also destroyed a P-47 Thunderbolt of the 56th Fighter Group flown by Lieutenant H. P. Dugas, who was killed. Knoke was then shot down by other P-47s and had to bail out. Knoke was brought down again on 4 October of that same year. After damaging a B-24 of the 392nd Bombardment Group in a frontal attack, which later went down, he was hit by the dorsal gunner's fire and Knoke bailed out of his damaged fighter into the bitterly cold North Sea. Covered by aircraft of his unit, Knoke managed to climb into an inflatable raft dropped by a Focke-Wulf Weihe. He was rescued two hours later by a lifeboat. Knoke claimed his 18th victory on 10 October 1943, a B-17, although his Bf 109G was hit by P-47s and 75% damaged, forcing him to land at Twente in the Netherlands.

Knoke was again shot down on 4 January 1944. On 10 February Gruppenkommandeur Günther Specht was wounded and Knoke became acting commander of II./JG 11. On 4 March Knoke was leading II./JG 11, when he was involved in the decimation of the 363rd Fighter Group. In a surprise attack on some 60 P-51 Mustangs over Hamburg, the USAAF lost 12 P-51s in a single action, Knoke claiming one himself. From 15 to 20 April 1944, Knoke was attached to the Experimental Station at Lechfeld in Bavaria, where he flew the Messerschmitt Me 262A jet fighter for the first time. Knoke was promoted to the rank of Hauptmann (Captain), on 28 April 1944, for "bravery in the face of the enemy", and made Gruppenkommandeur of II./ JG 11. At 23 years of age Knoke was, at the time, the youngest Gruppenkommandeur in the Luftwaffe. Knoke was shot down on 29 April in action against the P-51 of Captain James Cannon of the 354th Fighter Group and was hospitalised until August 1944 with severe concussion and related injuries. Before he bailed out, Knoke managed in turn to shoot down the overshooting 'Mustang' piloted by Capt. Cannon, who was taken prisoner. Knoke claimed to have had some friendly interactions with Cannon before both were picked up by German forces. Upon returning to base, Knoke developed a high fever and what later turned out to be a dangerous brain hemorrhage; following this, he had a complete nervous breakdown, grounding him until the middle of August.

== Normandy 1944 ==
Still recovering from his wounds, Knoke was then transferred on 13 August 1944 to command III./ JG 1. Operating over the Normandy front, Knoke claimed a P-47 over Rânes, southeast of Argentan on 14 August, (of the 358th Fighter Group, piloted by 2nd Lieutenant. S.A. Giamalva, who was killed) and another the next day. On 16 August he claimed a Spitfire near Étampes. A P-38 Lightning of the 31st Photo Squadron (Lieutenant. T.L. Wood, who was killed), was shot down on the 17th, followed by an unconfirmed B-26 Marauder later the same day. Two P-51s were claimed on 18 August.

On 25 August another P-51 of the 354th Fighter Group was claimed, but Knoke was shot down during the engagement. Bailing out behind the fluidly moving front line, Knoke was almost captured by French Maquis forces. Shooting his way clear, Knoke managed to regain the German lines and returned safely to his unit.

By the end of August 1944 III./ JG 1 had almost been wiped out in the air battles over the Western Front; Knoke was ordered to move the unit to Fels am Wagram, prior to its transfer back to Germany for reinforcement and re-equipment.

Given orders to then transfer III./JG 1 to Vienna, Hauptmann Knoke was seriously injured in the legs by a Partisan-planted land mine during a car journey near Prague on 9 October 1944.

In March 1945, while still on crutches, Knoke became the officer commanding at Jever air base. He also oversaw the work on defensive fortifications around Wilhelmshaven.

He was awarded the Knight's Cross of the Iron Cross (Ritterkreuz des Eisernen Kreuzes) on 27 April 1945.

In September 1945 Heinz Knoke returned to civilian life.

== Political career ==
In 1951 Heinz Knoke was elected to the legislature of Lower Saxony as a member of the Socialist Reich Party. Although the Supreme Court of the Federal Republic of Germany declared this party illegal in 1952, Knoke remained in politics as a member of the parish council of the Gemeinde Schortens (Gemeindeparlament) from April 1954.

For several years he also worked as a Manager with the Jever Pilsener Brauhaus.

He was a member of the Freie Demokratische Partei (FDP, Liberal Democratic Party), and was elected for the community parliament/parish parliament at the elections of October 1956, where he was returned to office in the March 1961, September 1964, and September 1968 elections.

He retired in October 1972 and in the mid-1980s joined Osnabrück University to study literature and philosophy.

== Wartime writings ==
During the 1950s Knoke wrote a book about his wartime career entitled I Flew for the Führer, which was published by C. Boesendahl in 1952 (an English version was initially published in 1953). The book was one of the first narratives to appear in the West by one of the Luftwaffe aces. His memoirs show his initial enthusiasm for the war, becoming grimmer and more demoralized at the beginning of 1944. In his last diary entries Knoke shows willingness to enter into an armistice with the Western Allies to continue the war against the USSR.

== Awards ==
- Iron Cross (1939) 2nd and 1st Class
- Front Flying Clasp of the Luftwaffe in Gold for Fighter Pilots
- Wound Badge (1939) in Silver
- German Cross in Gold (17 November 1943)
- Knight's Cross of the Iron Cross on 27 April 1945 as Hauptmann and Gruppenkommandeur of the III./JG 11
