= Blitz Week =

WWII aerial bombardment of Norway and Germany by the United States

- Part of Strategic bombing campaign in Europe
Date	July 24–26 & 28–30, 1943
Location	Nazi Germany: Hamburg (25th), Hanover (26th), Kassel (28th, 30th), Kiel (25th, 29th), Oschersleben (28th), Warnemünde (25th, 29th); Norway: Herøya & Trondheim (24th)

Belligerents
United States	Nazi Germany

Casualties and losses
100 aircraft 1,000 aircrew killed, wounded, captured, or missing	

Blitz Week was a period of United States Army Air Forces (USAAF) aerial bombardment during the 1943 Combined Bomber Offensive of World War II. Air raids were conducted on six of seven days as part of Operation Gomorrah, against targets such as the chemical plant at Herøya, Norway, which produced nitrates for explosives; and the AGO Flugzeugwerke AG plant (an Operation Pointblank target) at Oschersleben, Germany that assembled Focke-Wulf Fw 190s. The Kassel mission on July 28, 1943, was the first use of auxiliary external fuel tanks on the P-47 Thunderbolt.

== Attack on Norway ==
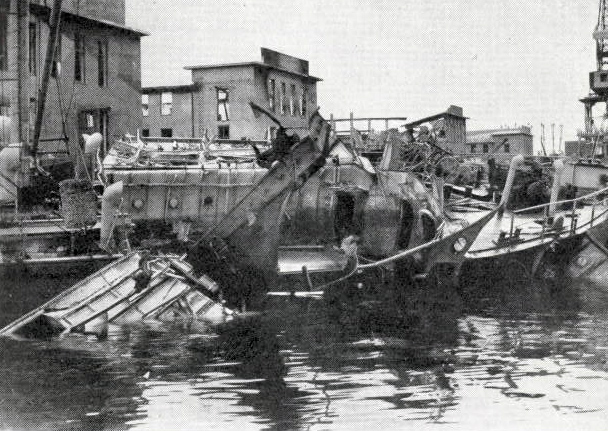
Aftermath of Ladehammerkaia in Trondheim from the allied attack in 1943

Norway was an important foothold for Germany due to strategic positioning and its connection to Swedish iron mines, connecting Lulea, Sweden to Narvik, Norway. On July 24, Trondheim and Herøya were attacked by the Eighth Air Force in their very first attack on the country; Trondheim was home to a large Kriegsmarine U-boat base and Herøya sheltered industrial plants producing magnesium and aluminum metals and nitrates for explosives, owned by the German company I. G. Farben. The highly successful attack on the processing plants struck a great blow to the German Luftwaffe, forcing them to find a new supplier for critical metals for aircraft. The Eighth Air Force sent 167 Boeing B-17 Flying Fortresses of the 1st Bombardment Wing, a single Boeing YB-40 Flying Fortress gunship escort, and 41 B-17s of the 4th Bombardment Wing B-17s. The attack on Norway was also the first time a splasher beacon was used during poor weather.

== Bombing of Hamburg ==
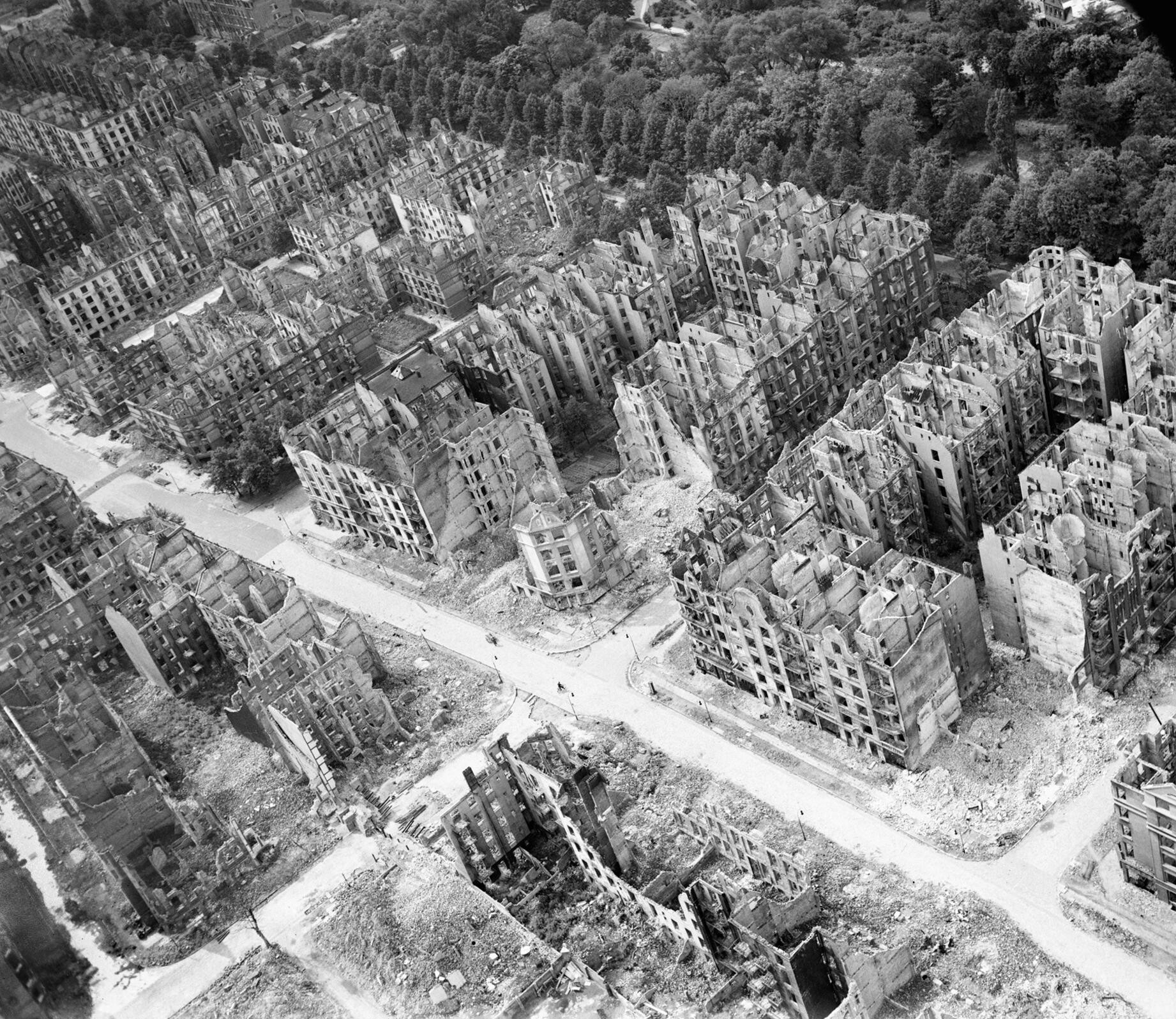
Hamburg after being bombed by the Royal Air Force and United States Army Air Force in 1943

During the last week of July in 1943, The Eighth Air Force of the United States Army Air Forces(USAAF) launched an offensive against Germany in the form of air raids in which 1,000 combatants were either killed, injured, or went missing. The United States of America launched these air raids alongside the British Royal Air Force bombing raids, which they called Operation Gomorrah. Hamburg was deemed an important strategic target due to its housing of U-boats and oil refineries in the region. Because the Nazis knew and understood the importance of Hamburg, the city was ringed with anti-aircraft weapons and 1,700 shelters were provided for its 230,000 citizens. To counter the radar use in Hamburg, British bombers dropped strips of tin foil, known as "Window", which confused the German radar screen and would appear as a cluster of targets on the screen. Britain's first attack came on the 24th, with the USAAF to follow the next day, but they ran into difficulties finding their targets due to the large amount of smoke from fires caused on the night before.

== Operation Pointblank ==
Pointblank was the code name for the main part of the Combined Bomber Offensive, focused on crippling Nazi Germany's aircraft production to create less resistance when invading German-occupied Europe. Operation Pointblank began on 14 June 1943 and lasted until 19 April of the next year. The USAAF focused on attacking aircraft factories during the day in "precision attacks” forcing the Luftwaffe into defending them and luring them into air battles; losses of trained pilots meant that even though German aircraft production rose, the combat efficiency of the Luftwaffe was reduced. During Operation Pointblank, both the USAAF and RAF had attacked several targets including: Shweinfurt, Regensburg, Oshersleben, Warnemünde, and Kassel.

=== Oschersleben ===
During the last week of July 1943, the Eighth Air Force launched several high-effort missions against aircraft production factories in Germany. General Ira C. Eaker and Fred Anderson were crucial in the planning of these attacks and had focused on the northern part of Germany, where the Eighth Air Force had routinely operated. The factories that were targeted were the AGO Flugzeugwerke located in Oschersleben, Heinkel Flugzeugwerke in Warnemünde, and Fieseler Flugzeugbau in Kassel. These factories produced the notable Focke-Wulf Fw 190 and Messerschmitt Bf 109 fighter planes. The attack began on 28 July, but the 120 B-17s from the 4th Bombardment Wing that had set out for Oschersleben ran into poor weather and became separated.
