= Edward O. McComas =

American fighter pilot during World War II

Edward Otis McComas
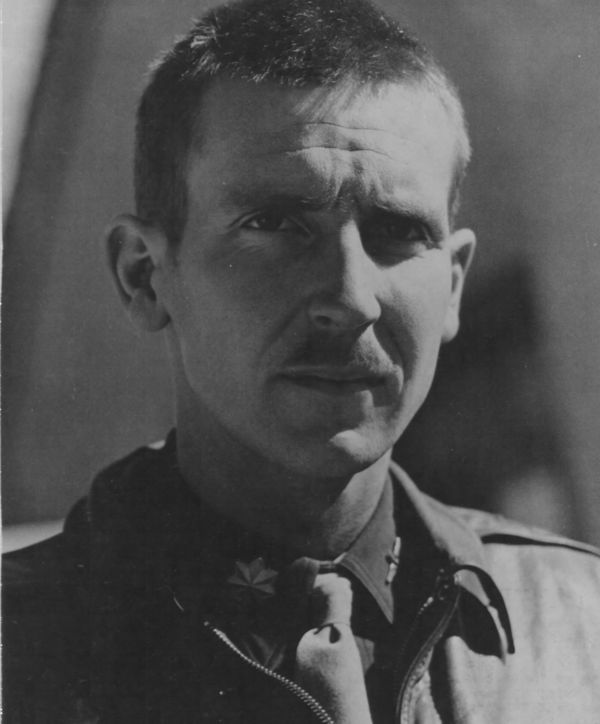
- Born: June 25, 1919; Winfield, Kansas
- Died: June 22, 1954 (aged 34) Alexandria, Virginia
- Buried: Highland Cemetery, Winfield, Kansas
- Allegiance: United States of America
- Branch: United States Army Air Forces; United States Air Force
- Service years: 1940–1954
- Rank: Colonel
- Conflicts: World War II; China Burma India Theater; Korean War
- Awards: Silver Star; Legion of Merit (2); Distinguished Flying Cross (2); Air Medal (2); Purple Heart

Edward Otis McComas (June 25, 1919 – June 22, 1954) was a United States Air Force colonel. He served in the United States Army Air Forces as a fighter pilot during World War II, and he became an ace with 14 aerial victories, including 5 in a single day.

== Early life and career ==
Edward O. McComas was born on June 25, 1919, in Winfield, Kansas. McComas graduated from Winfield High School in 1937 and attended Southwestern College and the University of Kansas. In 1940, he enlisted in the Army Air Forces as a flying cadet, receiving a commission as a second lieutenant in 1941.

== World War II ==
In October 1943, Major McComas was made the commanding officer of the 118th Fighter Squadron, 23rd Fighter Group, Fourteenth Air Force. The previous commanding officer was killed in a flying accident. In January 1944, his squadron traveled to the China Burma India Theater. Initially based in India, the squadron moved to an airfield in China in June.

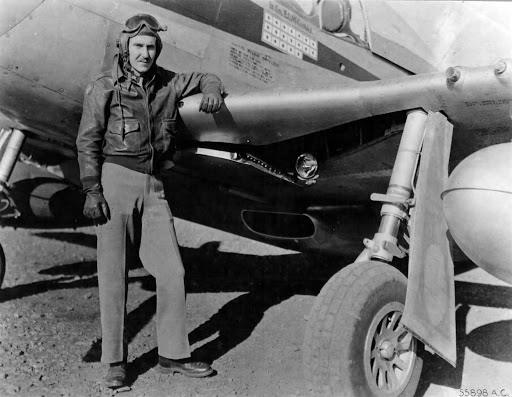
McComas with his P-51 in 1945

On September 29, 1944, McComas' P-51 Mustang was shot down and he was forced to bail out over China behind enemy lines. McComas, who had seriously injured his back earlier in his life, reinjured his back during this incident. However, he was rescued by Chinese Nationalist guerillas and was safely returned to his squadron.

Lieutenant Colonel McComas claimed his first aerial victory on October 16, 1944. He claimed a second victory on November 20, and then two more on December 5. On December 19, McComas claimed his fifth and sixth kills, officially becoming a flying ace. He claimed victories seven and eight two days later.

On December 23, McComas and his wingman were flying a reconnaissance mission of a Japanese airfield near Canton, China. While approaching the airfield, McComas engaged and shot down an enemy plane. At the airfield, Japanese pilots scrambled to their planes and began taking off in order to confront the two Americans. He attacked the airstrip and downed two planes just after they took off. He returned for a second pass and started to engage two more Japanese planes that had just taken off. While trying to evade McComas' guns, the two enemy planes collided and crashed. McComas was credited with shooting down five Japanese planes that day, thus making him the only pilot in the China-Burma-India Theater to achieve ace in a day status. The next day, McComas claimed his 14th and final aerial victory of the war, making him one of the top aces of the Fourteenth Air Force. On Christmas Day, the commanding general of the 14th Air Force, Claire Chennault, presented McComas a brand new P-51 Mustang.

McComas was relieved of his command of 118th Fighter Squadron in January 1945 as his back pain became more severe. He returned to the United States and spent several months in military hospitals.

== Post-war career ==
From 1946 to 1947, McComas was stationed in Germany. In 1949, he was promoted to colonel upon graduating from a course at the Air Command and Staff School at Maxwell Air Force Base, Alabama.

McComas flew several dozen combat missions at the start of the Korean War in 1950. He was appointed as commander of the 8th Fighter-Bomber Group in May 1951, flying F-80 Shooting Stars during the war. In July 1951, he was evacuated to the United States due to recurring back problems. He had multiple surgeries performed on his back over the next few years while he was assigned to the Pentagon.

== Awards and decorations ==

United States Air Force Senior Pilot Badge
Silver Star
Legion of Merit with bronze oak leaf cluster	Distinguished Flying Cross with bronze oak leaf cluster	Purple Heart
Air Medal with bronze oak leaf cluster	Air Force Presidential Unit Citation	American Defense Service Medal
American Campaign Medal	Asiatic-Pacific Campaign Medal with three bronze campaign stars	World War II Victory Medal
National Defense Service Medal	Korean Service Medal	Air Force Longevity Service Award with two bronze oak leaf clusters
Republic of Korea Presidential Unit Citation	United Nations Korea Medal	Republic of Korea War Service Medal
