= August Lambert =

German World War II fighter pilot (1916–1945)

- August Lambert
- Born: 18 February 1916; Kleestadt
- Died: 17 April 1945 (aged 29); Kamenz
- Military career
- Allegiance: Nazi Germany
- Branch: Luftwaffe
- Service years: 1937–1945
- Rank: Oberleutnant (first lieutenant)
- Unit: SchlG 1, SG 2, SG 77
- Conflicts: World War II
- Awards: Knight's Cross of the Iron Cross

August Lambert (18 February 1916 – 17 April 1945) was a German Luftwaffe military aviator and ground-attack pilot during World War II. As a fighter ace, he is credited with 116 aerial victories claimed in approximately 350 combat missions for which he was awarded the Knight's Cross of the Iron Cross, the highest award in the military and paramilitary forces of Nazi Germany during World War II. All of his aerial victories were claimed on the Eastern Front as a ground attack pilot in a Schlachtgeschwader, not as a fighter pilot in a Jagdgeschwader. He is the highest scoring ground attack pilot.

== Career ==
Lambert was born on 18 February 1916 in Kleestadt in the Grand Duchy of Hesse. After he joined the Luftwaffe, he was trained as a pilot in 1937/38. (Note: Flight training in the Luftwaffe progressed through the levels A1, A2 and B1, B2, referred to as A/B flight training. A training included theoretical and practical training in aerobatics, navigation, long-distance flights and dead-stick landings. The B courses included high-altitude flights, instrument flights, night landings and training to handle the aircraft in difficult situations.) Lambert then served as a flight instructor in various training units until 1943.

== World War II ==
World War II in Europe began on Friday 1 September 1939, when German forces invaded Poland. In 1943, Lambert was transferred to II. Gruppe (2nd group) of Schlachtgeschwader 1 (SG 1—1st Ground Assault Wing). As an Oberfeldwebel, he flew his first combat mission on southern sector of the Eastern Front and claimed his first aerial victory on 23 April 1943 was not confirmed. Lambert flew almost 200 ground support missions in which he and the fellow pilots of II./SG 2 accounted for the destruction of hundreds of ground support vehicles and artillery batteries.

II./SG 1 was renamed Schlachtgeschwader 2 "Immelmann" (SG 2—2nd Ground Assault Wing) on 18 October 1943.

II. Gruppe of SG 2 was heavily involved in the Crimean campaign during early-mid 1944, and in addition to its usual ground-attack work flew interception sorties, claiming some 247 Soviet aircraft shot down. On 10 April 1944, he claimed four victories, a Yak-9, a P-39 Airacobra and two Il-2 Sturmoviks. On 17 April 1944, Lambert was credited with twelve aerial victories, including five Il-2 Sturmovik. According to Bergström, this number may be exaggerated according to Soviet records. The Ministry of Aviation (RLM—Reichsluftfahrtministerium) only holds records for five of these claims. He claimed nine further victories on 4 May. On 6 May 1944, Lambert again claimed to have become a "double-ace in a day". These 14 aerial victories over an unknown type were not documented by the RLM.

Leutnant Lambert claimed some 70 aerial victories during one three-week period. He received the Knight's Cross of the Iron Cross (Ritterkreuz des Eisernen Kreuzes) on 14 May 1944 and the German Cross in Gold (Deutsches Kreuz in Gold) on 1 October 1944. By May 1944, the depleted II./SG 2 retired to bases in Romania.

Following the Battle of the Crimea resulting in the evacuation of the Crimea by the Germans, Lambert served as an instructor with Schlachtgeschwader 151. In March 1945, he was posted to Schlachtgeschwader 77 (SG 77—77th Ground Assault Wing) where he commanded 8. Staffel as Staffelkapitän (squadron leader) and Oberleutnant. In April 1945, Lambert was credited with his 100th aerial victory. He was the 101st Luftwaffe pilot to achieve the century mark.

On the morning of 17 April 1945, Leutnant Gerhard Bauer, Lambert, and another pilot were taking off from Kamenz for a mission to the front when American P-51Ds of the 55th Fighter Group appeared. Bauer's Fw 190 F-9 "Black 1 +" was quickly shot down north of Kuckau, about eight kilometres east-south-east of Kamenz. August Lambert and another 8./Schlachtgeschwader 77 pilot tried desperately to get away, but could not lose their pursuers. Lambert was shot down and killed in action in his Fw 190 F-8 "Black 9 +" (Werknummer 584043—factory number) just north of Hoyerswerda, a town some 20 kilometres (12 mi) north-north-east of Kamenz.

Lambert was officially credited with shooting down 116 enemy aircraft, all claimed on the Eastern Front. He also claimed over 100 vehicles destroyed in ground attacks. After his death, Lambert had been nominated for the Oak Leaves to his Knight's Cross, but this request was not approved.

== Summary of career ==
=== Aerial victory claims ===
According to US historian David T. Zabecki, Lambert was credited with 116 aerial victories. Mathews and Foreman, authors of Luftwaffe Aces — Biographies and Victory Claims, researched the German Federal Archives and state that Lambert was credited with 103 aerial victories, all of which claimed on the Eastern Front.

Chronicle of aerial victories
This and the ♠ (Ace of spades) indicates those aerial victories which made Lambert an "ace-in-a-day", a term which designates a fighter pilot who has shot down five or more airplanes in a single day. This and the – (dash) indicates unconfirmed aerial victory claims for which Lambert did not receive credit.
Claim	Date	Time	Type	Location	Claim	Date	Time	Type	Location
– II. Gruppe of Schlachtgeschwader 2 "Immelmann" –
—	23 April 1943	—	unknown						
– 6. Staffel of Schlachtgeschwader 2 "Immelmann" –
	13 February 1944	12:25	Yak-9			16 March 1944	15:45	Yak-9	
– II. Gruppe of Schlachtgeschwader 2 "Immelmann" –
	19 March 1944	07:38	P-39		♠	4 May 1944	—	unknown	
	26 March 1944	13:25	P-39		♠	4 May 1944	—	unknown	
	9 April 1944	07:24	Yak-9		♠	4 May 1944	—	unknown	
♠	10 April 1944	—	unknown		♠	4 May 1944	—	unknown	
♠	10 April 1944	—	unknown		♠	4 May 1944	—	unknown	
♠	10 April 1944	—	unknown		♠	4 May 1944	—	unknown	
♠	10 April 1944	04:24	Il-2		♠	4 May 1944	—	unknown	
♠	10 April 1944	10:18	P-39		♠	4 May 1944	—	unknown	
♠	10 April 1944	12:20	Il-2		♠	6 May 1944	—	unknown	
♠	10 April 1944	12:25	Yak-9		♠	6 May 1944	—	unknown	
♠	17 April 1944	—	unknown		♠	6 May 1944	—	unknown	
♠	17 April 1944	—	unknown		♠	6 May 1944	—	unknown	
♠	17 April 1944	—	unknown		♠	6 May 1944	—	unknown	
♠	17 April 1944	—	unknown		♠	6 May 1944	—	unknown	
♠	17 April 1944	—	unknown		♠	6 May 1944	—	unknown	
♠	17 April 1944	—	unknown		♠	6 May 1944	—	unknown	
♠	17 April 1944	—	unknown		♠	6 May 1944	—	unknown	
♠	17 April 1944	08:00	Il-2		♠	6 May 1944	—	unknown	
♠	17 April 1944	08:06	Il-2		♠	6 May 1944	—	unknown	
♠	17 April 1944	09:45	Il-2		♠	6 May 1944	—	unknown	
♠	17 April 1944	09:46	Il-2		♠	6 May 1944	—	unknown	
♠	17 April 1944	09:47	Il-2		♠	6 May 1944	—	unknown	
♠	4 May 1944	—	unknown						
– III. Gruppe of Schlachtgeschwader 77 –
102	17 April 1945	—	P-51	vicinity of Kamenz airfield					

=== Awards ===
- Iron Cross (1939) 2nd and 1st class
- Honour Goblet of the Luftwaffe (Ehrenpokal der Luftwaffe) on 17 January 1944 as Oberfeldwebel and pilot
- German Cross in Gold 1 October 1944 as Leutnant in the 5./Schlachtgeschwader 2
- Knight's Cross of the Iron Cross on 14 May 1944 as Leutnant and pilot in the 5./Schlachtgeschwader 2 "Immelmann"
- Mentioned three times in the Wehrmachtbericht
