= List of aviators who became ace in a day =

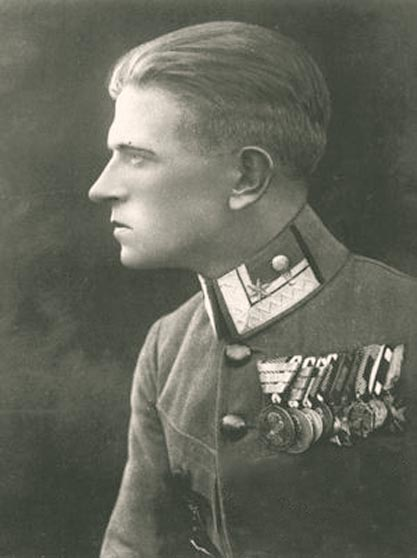
Julius Arigi, the first "ace in a day"

The term "ace in a day" is used to designate a pilot who has shot down five or more aircraft in a single day, based on the usual definition of an "ace" as one with five or more aerial victories.

== World War I ==
=== Ace in a day on two occasions ===
A Bristol F2B crew – Canadian pilot Captain Alfred Atkey and English observer Lieutenant Charles Gass – became "ace in a day" twice in the same week. On 7 May 1918, they shot down five German planes in a single sortie over Arras. Two days later, on 9 May, they were credited with another five enemy machines in the course of two sorties. Atkey and Gass survived the Great War. Atkey credited with a total of 38 victories, making him the most successful two-seater pilot and Gass with 39 claims was the most successful observer ace of all time.

René Fonck, the top scoring French Aéronautique Militaire and Allied ace of the war, scored six in a day on both 9 May and 26 September 1918.

=== Ace in a day ===
The first aviators to ever achieve "ace in a day" were pilot Julius Arigi and observer/gunner Johann Lasi of the Austro-Hungarian air force, on 22 August 1916, when they downed five Italian planes.

The first single pilot (as opposed to double aviators, as is the case with the previously mentioned Arigi and Lasi) was World War I German flying ace Fritz Otto Bernert. Bernert scored five victories within 20 minutes on 24 April 1917. He had a total of 27 kills during the war, even though he wore glasses and had a useless left arm.

- Andrew Beauchamp-Proctor, the top scoring South African ace of the war, was piloting an SE5a fighter with Royal Air Force No 84 Squadron when he shot down five German aircraft on 19 May 1918.
- Raymond Collishaw, a Canadian who was the top scoring Royal Naval Air Service ace, piloted a Sopwith Triplane when scoring six Albatros D.V fighters near Menen, 6 July 1917.
- John Lightfoot Trollope of the Royal Air Force shot down and destroyed seven German planes on 24 March 1918.
- Henry Woollett of the Royal Air Force shot down and destroyed six German airplanes on 12 April 1918, setting two afire.
- Frederick McCall, Canadian flying ace, shot down five German fighters, four (3 Albatros D.V and 1 Fokker D.VII) in the morning and the fifth in the evening (Albatros D.V) of 30 June 1918 . For this success he was awarded the Distinguished Service Order.
- John Inglis Gilmour of the Royal Air Force successfully brought down five German aircraft in a single day on 1 July 1918. He achieved this whilst piloting a Sopwith Camel fighter.
- Billy Bishop, the top scoring Canadian and British Empire ace of the war, was piloting an S.E.5 on 19 June 1918, when he scored four Pfalz D.III fighters and a LVG C two-seat reconnaissance aircraft near Ploegsteert.
- Walter Carl Simon, who served in No. 139 Squadron RAF became the first American ace in day when he and his observer William Smith in a Bristol F.2b shot down on 30 July 1918 three Albatros D.IIIs, one LVG C and one reconnaissance plane
- Eugene Seeley Coler, like W. C. Simon also an American serving in the RAF, at No. 11 Squadron RAF, and also flying a Bristol F.2b, on 13 August 1918 with his observer Cyril William Gladman shot down five Fokker D.VIIs. For this, he was awarded the Distinguished Flying Cross.
- Heinrich Gontermann of the Luftstreitkräfte achieved five aerial victories on 19 August 1918 when, flying a Fokker D.VII, he shot down a SPAD fighter in the morning and destroyed four Allied observation balloons in the afternoon.
- Arthur Spurling, a Bermudian pilot of No. 49 Squadron RAF, with his observer Frank Bell, were flying a DH.9 bomber on 23 August 1918, when they single-handedly attacked thirty Fokker D.VII fighters, downing five of them (three by Spurling, two by Bell). Two days later Spurling shot down another D.VII over Mont Notre Dame. The two crewmen shared each other's victories, each attaining ace status in a single mission.
- Frank Luke of 27th Aero Squadron USAAS, at the controls of a SPAD XIII, achieved five victories on 18 September 1918, destroying two Fokker D.VII fighters, two observation balloons and an Halberstadt reconnaissance plane. Luke was killed in action 11 days later.
- Friedrich Ritter von Röth of Jagdstaffel 16 shot down five observation balloons in 15 minutes on 29 May 1918.

== World War II ==
=== Triple-ace in a day ===
To achieve this a pilot must have destroyed 15 enemy aircraft in a single day. This has been achieved by only five pilots, all from the Luftwaffe:

- Hans-Joachim Marseille shot down 17 Allied fighters in three sorties over North Africa on 1 September 1942.
- Emil Lang shot down 18 Soviet fighters on 3 November 1943, the most kills on a single day by any pilot in history.
- August Lambert shot down 17 Soviet aircraft on a single day in 1944.
- Hubert Strassl shot down 15 Soviet aircraft on 5 July 1943 near Orel.
- Wilhelm Batz claimed 15 Soviet aircraft shot down on 31 May 1944.

=== Double-ace in a day ===
To achieve this a pilot must have destroyed ten enemy aircraft in a single day. This has been achieved by twelve pilots, three of whom repeated their achievement a second time within weeks.

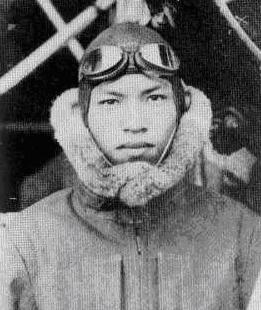
Hiromichi Shinohara, double-ace in a day

- Hiromichi Shinohara, on 27 June 1939 set an Imperial Japanese Army Air Force record of eleven victories in a single day during an air battle over Tamsak-Bulak. He is highest scoring non-German ace in a day in history.
- Adolf Dickfeld claimed eleven Soviet aircraft shot down on 8 May 1942.
- Hermann Graf, the first fighter pilot to claim 200 aerial victories, shot down ten Soviet aircraft on 23 September 1942.
- Max Stotz claimed ten Soviet aircraft shot down on 30 December 1942.
- Walter Nowotny, the first fighter pilot to claim 250 aerial victories, twice shot down ten in one day. On 24 June 1943 and on 1 September 1943 he claimed ten Soviet aircraft shot down.
- Erich Rudorffer is credited with the destruction of the most aircraft ever in a single mission when he shot down thirteen Soviet aircraft on 11 October 1943.
- Johannes Wiese claimed twelve Soviet aircraft shot down on 5 July 1943.
- Walter Wolfrum twice shot down ten or more aircraft on one day. On 30 May 1944, he claimed eleven Soviet aircraft destroyed and on 16 July 1944, he claimed further ten shot down.
- Walter Schuck claimed eleven Soviet aircraft shot down on 17 June 1944.
- Erich Hartmann, the highest-scoring fighter ace in history, twice shot down ten or more aircraft on one day. On 26 February 1944, he claimed ten planes and eleven on 24 August 1944, in two consecutive missions. In the process, he became the first 300-kill ace in history, and as a result of this, gained the Knight's Cross of the Iron Cross with Oak Leaves, Swords and Diamonds, by then Germany's highest military award for standard servicemen.
- Franz Schall twice shot down ten or more aircraft on one day. On 26 August 1944, he claimed eleven Soviet aircraft destroyed, and on 31 August 1944, he claimed a further thirteen shot down.
- Heinz-Wolfgang Schnaufer: although claiming only nine aircraft shot down, he destroyed ten RAF bombers on 21 February 1945.

=== Multiple times ace in a day ===
==== Eighteen-time ace in day ====
- On 7 July 1943, then again on 1 August, 4 August, 5 August, 7 August 1943, 30 January 1944, 1 February 1944, 26 February 1944, 5 May 1944, 1 June 1944, 4 June 1944, 5 June 1944, 6 June 1944, 22 August 1944, 23 August 1944, 24 August 1944, 22 November 1944 and 23 November 1944, Luftwaffe fighter pilot Erich Hartmann became an eighteen-time ace in a day by shooting down seven, five, five, five, five, six, five, ten, six, six, seven, six, five, five, eight, eleven, six and five respectively.

==== Seventeen-time ace in day ====
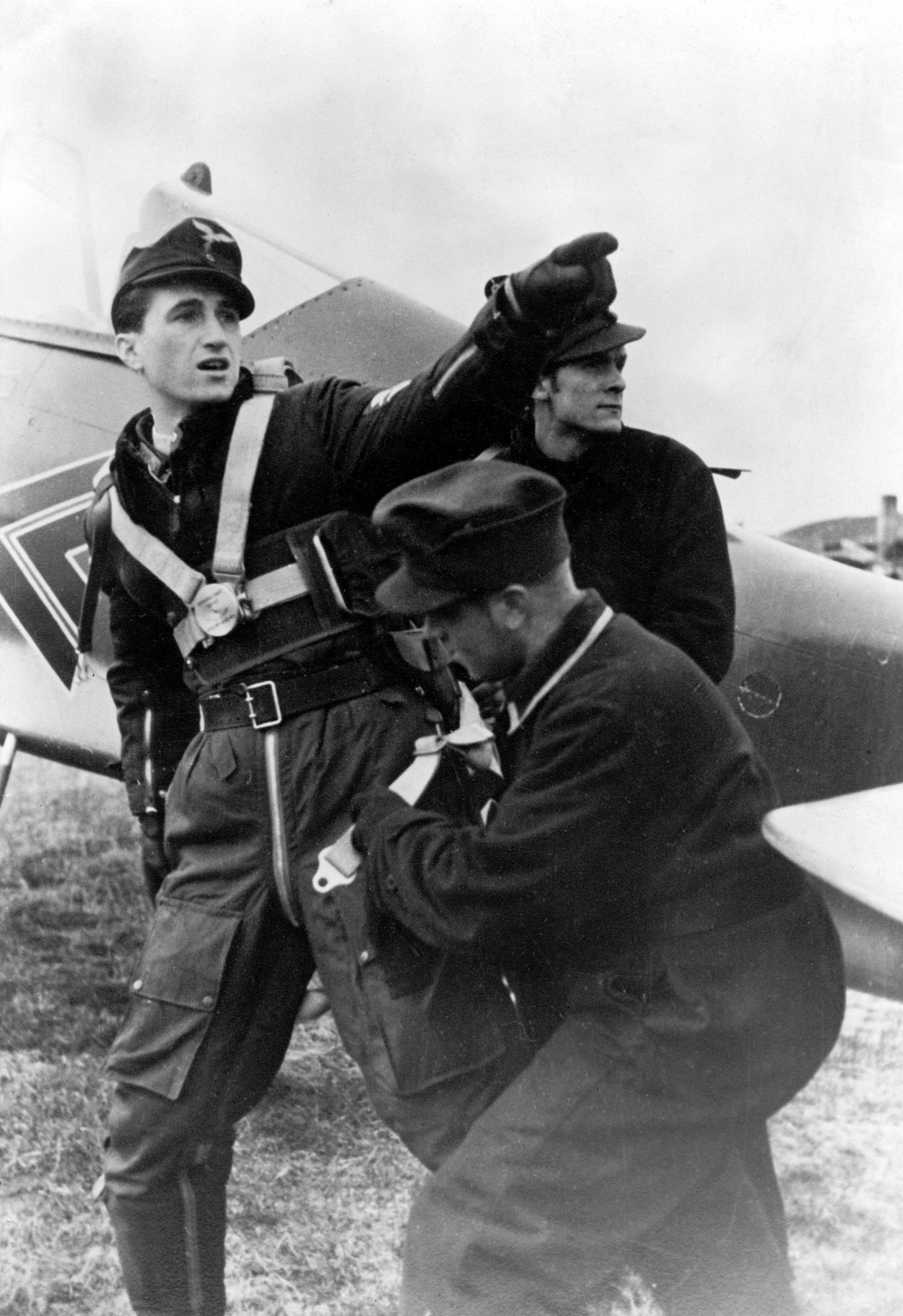
Walter Nowotny, seventeen-time ace in day

- On 20 July 1942, then again on 2 August 1942, 1 June 1943, 8 June 1943, 21 June 1943, 24 June 1943, 13 August 1943, 18 August 1943, 21 August 1943, 1 September 1943, 2 September 1943, 8 September 1943, 14 September 1943, 15 September 1943, 9 October 1943, 13 October 1943 and 14 October 1943, Walter Nowotny, Luftwaffe fighter pilot on the Eastern Front, became a seventeen-time ace in a day, with five, seven, five, six, six, ten, nine, six, seven, ten, six, five, six, six, eight, six and six respectively.

==== Thirteen-time ace in day ====
- On 10 May 1942, then again on 27 September 1942, 30 October 1942, 10 March 1943, 12 March 1943, 13 April 1943, 8 June 1943, 4 July 1943, 25 July 1943, 13 October 1943, 1 February 1944, 25 March 1944 and 7 June 1944, Theodor Weissenberger, Luftwaffe fighter pilot on the Eastern and Western Front, became a thirteen-time ace in a day, with five, five, five, six, five, six, five, seven, five, five, five, five and five respectively.
- On 9 February 1943, then again on 15 February 1943, 24 August 1943, 14 September 1943, 11 October 1943, 6 November 1943, 7 April 1944, 3 July 1944, 26 July 1944, 25 August 1944, 25 September 1944, 10 October 1944 and 28 October 1944, Erich Rudorffer, Luftwaffe fighter pilot on the Eastern Front, became a thirteen-time ace in a day, with eight, seven, eight, five, seven, fourteen, six, five, six, five, six, seven and eleven respectively.

==== Twelve-time ace in day ====
- On 1 December 1943, then again on 2 December 1943, 5 December 1943, 8 April 1944, 10 April 1944, 2 May 1944, 31 May 1944, 5 June 1944, 19 July 1944, 17 August 1944, 22 August 1944 and 23 October 1944, Wilhelm Batz, Luftwaffe fighter pilot on the Eastern Front, became a twelve-time ace in a day, with five, five, six, six, five, five, fifteen, eight, six, six, six and five respectively.

==== Ten-time ace in day ====
- On 30 July 1941, then again on 13 August 1941, 30 December 1942, 7 January 1943, 12 January 1943, 14 January 1943, 23 January 1943, 23 February 1943, 7 March 1943, and 16 March 1943, Hans Philipp, Luftwaffe fighter pilot on the Eastern Front, became a ten-time ace in a day, with five, five, eight, five, seven, five, six, eight, nine and five respectively.

==== Nine-time ace in day ====
- On 17 March 1944, then again on 7 April 1944, 25 May 1944, 15 June 1944, 17 June 1944, 28 June 1944, 17 July 1944, 22 July 1944, and 23 August 1944, Walter Schuck, Luftwaffe fighter pilot on the Eastern Front, became a nine-time ace in a day, with seven, six, six, six, eleven, seven, seven, seven and five victories, respectively.
- On 16 May 1944, then again on 26 May 1944, 17 June 1944, 27 June 1944, 28 June 1944, 4 July 1944, 23 August 1944, 9 October 1944, and 21 October 1944, Franz Dörr, Luftwaffe fighter pilot on the Eastern Front, became a nine-time ace in a day, with seven, five, eight, six, six, five, seven, six and five victories, respectively.

==== Eight-time ace in day ====
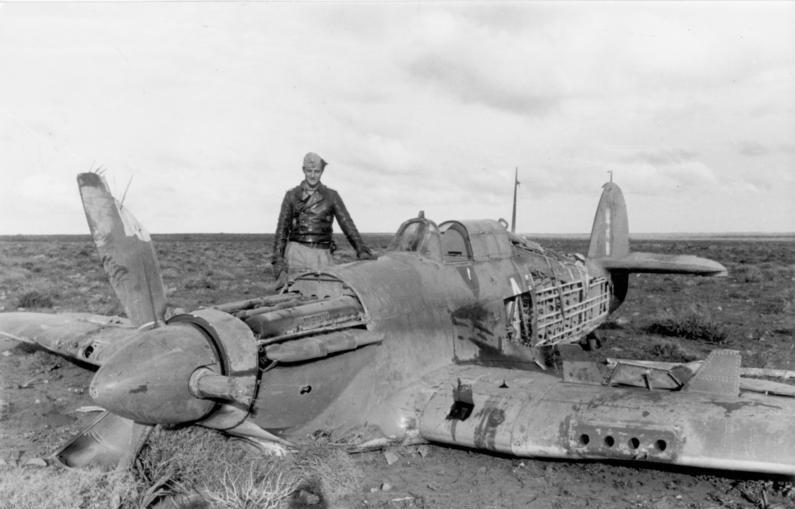
Hans-Joachim Marseille, eight-time ace in day

- On 24 September 1941, then again on 3 and 17 June 1942, 1, 2, 3, 15 and 26 September 1942, Hans-Joachim Marseille, Luftwaffe fighter pilot in the North Africa, became an eight-time ace in a day, claiming five, six, six, seventeen, five, six, seven and seven aerial victories, respectively.
- On 30 April 1942, then again on 2, 8, 13, and 14 May 1942, 14 August 1942, 2 and 23 September 1942, Hermann Graf, Luftwaffe fighter pilot on the Eastern Front, became an eight-time ace in a day, claiming six, seven, eight, six, seven, five, five and ten aerial victories, respectively.
- On 12 January 1943, then again on 4 August 1943, 4 April 1944, 28 June 1944, 14 September 1944, and 9, 27 and 29 October 1944, Otto Kittel, Luftwaffe fighter pilot on the Eastern Front, became an eight-time ace in a day, claiming six, seven, five, five, six, five, seven and six aerial victories, respectively.
- On 7 October 1943, then again on 13, 21, 22, 23 and 24 October 1943, 2 and 3 November 1943, Emil Lang, Luftwaffe fighter pilot on the Eastern Front, became an eight-time ace in a day, claiming five, ten, twelve, nine, six, five, eight and eighteen aerial victories, respectively.

==== Seven-time ace in day ====
- On 5 July 1942, then again on 20 October 1943, 28 October 1943, 22 February 1944, 24 June 1944, 16 July 1944 and 8 August 1944, Anton Hafner, Luftwaffe fighter pilot on the Eastern and Western Front, became a seven-time ace in a day.
- On 17 March 1944, then again on 27 June 1944, 28 June 1944, 4 July 1944, 17 July 1944, 17 August 1944 and 23 August 1944, Jakob Norz, Luftwaffe fighter pilot on the Eastern and Western Front, became a seven-time ace in a day.

==== Six-time ace in day ====
- On 30 June 1941, then again on 30 August 1941, 19 May 1942, 3 November 1942, 14 January 1943 and 26 February 1943, Heinrich Bär, Luftwaffe fighter pilot on the Eastern and Western Front, became a six-time ace in a day.
- On 22 June 1942, then again on 19 July and 20 July 1942, 2 December, 28 December 1943 and 16 November 1944, Gerhard Barkhorn, Luftwaffe fighter pilot on the Eastern Front, became a six-time ace in a day, claiming five, six, five, six, seven and five aerial victories respectively.
- On 22 August 1942, then again on 3, 29 and 30 December 1942, 14 and 26 January 1943, Max Stotz, Luftwaffe fighter pilot on the Eastern Front, became a six-time ace in a day, claiming five, five, five, ten, seven and six aerial victories respectively.
- On 27 March 1943, then again on 13 April 1943, 17 March 1944, 11 May 1944, 26 May 1944 and 17 July 1944, Heinrich Ehrler, Luftwaffe fighter pilot on the Eastern and Western Front, became a six-time ace in a day, with five, six, seven, five, five and five victories, respectively.

==== Five-times ace in day ====
- On 21 August 1941, potentially also on 28 September 1941, then again on 18 and 19 October 1941, 22 October 1941, and 16 August 1942, Gordon Gollob, Luftwaffe fighter pilot on the Eastern Front, became a five-time, maybe six-time, ace in a day.
- On 17 December 1942, then again on 16 April 1943, 23 October 1943, 19 July 1944 and 15 October 1944, Rudolf Trenkel, Luftwaffe fighter pilot on the Eastern Front, became a five-time ace in a day, claiming six, five, five, five and six aerial victories respectively.
- On 30 December 1942, then again on 14 and 23 January 1943, Hans "Assi" Hahn, Luftwaffe fighter pilot on the Eastern Front, became a five-time ace in a day, claiming five, seven and five aerial victories respectively.
- On 18 January 1943, then again on 23 February 1943, 24 February 1943, 6 May 1943, and 21 July 1943, Josef Jennewein, Luftwaffe fighter pilot on the Eastern Front, became a five-time ace in a day, claiming five, five, seven, five, and five aerial victories, respectively.
- On 13 July 1943, then again on 7 September 1943, 15 September 1943, 16 February 1945 and 25 April 1945, Günther Josten, Luftwaffe fighter pilot on the Eastern Front, five times became an ace in a day.
- On 2 August 1943, then again on 14 and 20 August 1943, 4 September 1943 and 5 February 1944, Oskar Romm, Luftwaffe fighter pilot on the Eastern Front, became a five-time ace in a day, with five, five, six, five and six victories, respectively.
- On 19 March 1944, then again on 20, 30 and 31 May 1944, and 16 July 1944, Walter Wolfrum, Luftwaffe fighter pilot on the Eastern Front, became a five-time ace in a day, claiming six, five, eleven, six, and ten aerial victories, respectively.
- On 8 April 1944, then again on 9 April 1944, 17 April 1944, 18 April 1944 and 7 May 1944, Gerhard Hoffmann, Luftwaffe fighter pilot on the Eastern Front, became a five-time ace in a day.

==== Four-time ace in day ====
- On 26 June 1941, then again on 12 July 1941, 7 July 1942 and 9 July 1942, Viktor Bauer, Luftwaffe fighter pilot on the Eastern and Western Front, became a four-time ace in a day.
- On 24 October 1941, then again on 8 May 1942, 13 and 14 May 1942, Adolf Dickfeld, Luftwaffe fighter pilot on the Eastern Front, became a four-time ace in a day, claiming five, eleven, six and eight aerial victories respectively.
- On 9 March 1942, then again on 12 July 1942, 13 July 1942 and 22 July 1942, Erwin Clausen, Luftwaffe fighter pilot on the Eastern Front, became a four-time ace in a day, claiming five, five, five and six aerial victories respectively.
- On 17 July 1942, then again on 11 January 1943, 13 March 1943, and 1 April 1943, Ernst-Wilhelm Reinert, Luftwaffe fighter pilot on the Eastern Front and in North Africa, became a four-time ace in a day, claiming eight, five, six and five aerial victories respectively.
- On 30 August 1942, then again on 7 September 1942, 16 September 1942 and 18 September 1942, Friedrich-Karl "Tutti" Müller, Luftwaffe fighter pilot on the Eastern Front, became a four-time ace in a day, with five, seven, five and five victories, respectively.
- On 20 April 1943, then again on 8 May 1943, 5 July 1943 and 7 July 1943, Joachim Kirschner, Luftwaffe fighter pilot on the Eastern Front, became a four-time ace in a day, with eight, seven, eight and five victories, respectively.
- On 20 April 1943, then again on 5 November 1943, 6 November 1943 and 8 April 1944, Heinrich Sturm, Luftwaffe fighter pilot on the Eastern Front, became a four-time ace in a day, with five, six, six and eight victories, respectively.
- On 26 May 1943, then again on 27 May, 4 and 19 August 1943, Berthold Korts, Luftwaffe fighter pilot on the Eastern Front, became a three-time ace in a day, with five, five, nine and five victories, respectively.
- On 8 June 1943, then again on 5 July 1943, 7 July 1943 and 8 July 1943, Hubert Strassl, Luftwaffe fighter pilot on the Eastern Front, became a four-time ace in a day, with six, fifteen, six and five victories, respectively.
- On 5 July 1943, then again on 7, 10 and 13 July 1943, Günther Scheel, Luftwaffe fighter pilot on the Eastern Front, became a four-time ace in a day, with eight, seven, five and six victories, respectively.
- On 10 April 1944, then again on 17 April 1944, 4 May 1944, and 6 May 1944, August Lambert, Luftwaffe fighter pilot on the Eastern Front, became a four-time ace in a day, with seven, twelve, nine and fourteen victories, respectively.
- On 16 May 1944, then again on 25 May 1944, 26 May 1944, and 17 June 1944, Rudi Linz, Luftwaffe fighter pilot on the Eastern Front, became a four-time ace in a day, with five, five, five and nine victories, respectively.

==== Three-time ace in day ====
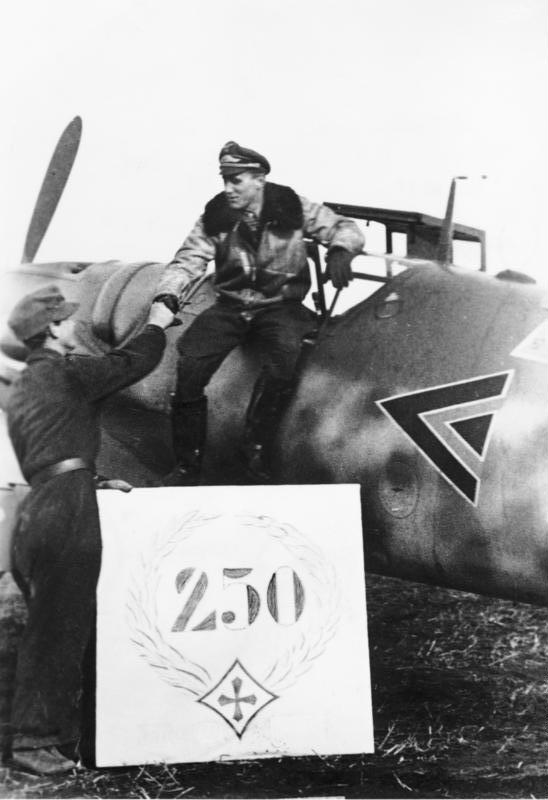
Günther Rall, three-time ace in a day

- On 22 June 1941, then again on 6 July 1942 and 22 September 1942, Wolf-Dietrich Wilcke, Luftwaffe fighter pilot on the Eastern Front, became a three-time ace in a day, with five, six and six victories, respectively.
- On 24 June 1941, then again on 5 July 1942 and 2 August 1942, Karl-Heinz Schnell, Luftwaffe fighter pilot on the Eastern Front, became a three-time ace in a day, with seven, six and five victories, respectively.
- On 10 July 1941, then again on 12 July 1941 and 12 August 1941, Walter Oesau, Luftwaffe fighter pilot on the Eastern and Western Front, became a three-time ace in a day, with five, seven and six victories, respectively.
- On 17 August 1941, then again on 20 August 1942 and 5 July 1943, Werner Lucas, Luftwaffe fighter pilot on the Eastern Front, became a three-time ace in a day.
- On 24 March 1942, then again on 30 March 1942 and 20 April 1942, Herbert Ihlefeld, Luftwaffe fighter pilot on the Eastern and Western Front, became a three-time ace in a day.
- On 19 April 1942, then again on 21 July 1942 and 23 July 1942, Anton Hackl, Luftwaffe fighter pilot on the Eastern and Western Front, became a three-time ace in a day.
- On 7 July 1942, then again on 4 August 1942 and 9 November 1942, Heinrich Klöpper, Luftwaffe fighter pilot on the Eastern and Western Front, became a three-time ace in a day.
- On 26 July 1942, then again on 7 August 1942 and 5 July 1943, Kurt Brändle, Luftwaffe fighter pilot on the Eastern Front, became a three-time ace in a day.
- On 24 August 1942, then again on 17 September 1942 and 4 August 1943, Heinz Schmidt, Luftwaffe fighter pilot on the Eastern Front, became a three-time ace in a day, with seven, five and five victories, respectively.
- On 4 December 1942, then again on 24 February 1943 and 23 June 1943, Edwin Thiel, Luftwaffe fighter pilot on the Eastern Front, became a three-time ace in a day.
- On 3 May 1943, then again on 20 August 1943 and 10 October 1943, Günther Rall, Luftwaffe fighter pilot on the Eastern Front, and the third highest scoring ace in history, became a three-time ace in a day, claiming five aerial victories on each of these days.
- On 5 July 1943, then again on 4 and 23 August 1943, Gerhard Loos, Luftwaffe fighter pilot on the Eastern Front, became a three-time ace in a day, with five, six and six victories, respectively.
- On 6 July 1943, then again on 26 and 27 September 1943, Rudolf Wagner, Luftwaffe fighter pilot on the Eastern Front, became a three-time ace in a day, with five, five and six victories, respectively.
- On 12 July 1943, then again on 22 November 1943 and 14 October 1944, Joachim Brendel, Luftwaffe fighter pilot on the Eastern Front, became a three-time ace in a day, with five, six and five victories, respectively.
- On 20 July 1943, then again on 2 January 1944 and 21 January 1944, Heinrich Prinz zu Sayn-Wittgenstein, Luftwaffe night fighter pilot on the Eastern and Western Front, became a three-time ace in a day, with seven, six and five victories, respectively.
- On 21 October 1943, then again on 22 October 1943 and 3 November 1943, Reinhold Hoffmann, Luftwaffe fighter pilot on the Eastern Front, became a three-time ace in a day, with seven, eight and eight victories, respectively.
- On 7 January 1944, then again on 13 March 1944 and 19 March 1944, Herbert Bachnick, Luftwaffe fighter pilot on the Eastern Front, became a three-time ace in a day.
- On 22 March 1944, then again on 31 March 1944 and 14 March 1945, Martin Becker, a Luftwaffe night fighter pilot, became a three-time ace in a day, with six, seven and nine victories, respectively.
- On 19 April 1944, then again on 30 May 1944 and 16 October 1944, Hans-Joachim Birkner, Luftwaffe fighter pilot on the Eastern Front, became a three-time ace in a day, with six, five and five victories, respectively.
- On 25 August, then again on 26 August 1944 and 31 August 1944, Anton Resch, Luftwaffe fighter pilot on the Eastern Front, became a three-time ace in a day, with five, seven and seven victories, respectively.
- On 26 August, then again on 31 August 1944 and 1 September 1944, Franz Schall, Luftwaffe fighter pilot on the Eastern Front, became a three-time ace in a day, with eleven, thirteen and five victories, respectively.

==== Two-time ace in day ====
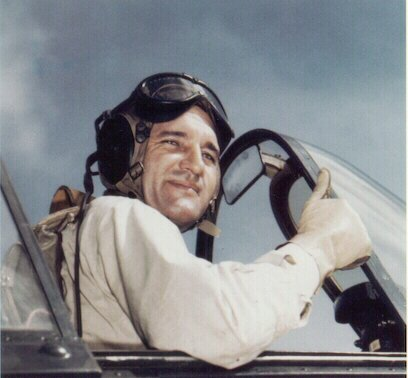
David McCampbell, two-time ace in a day

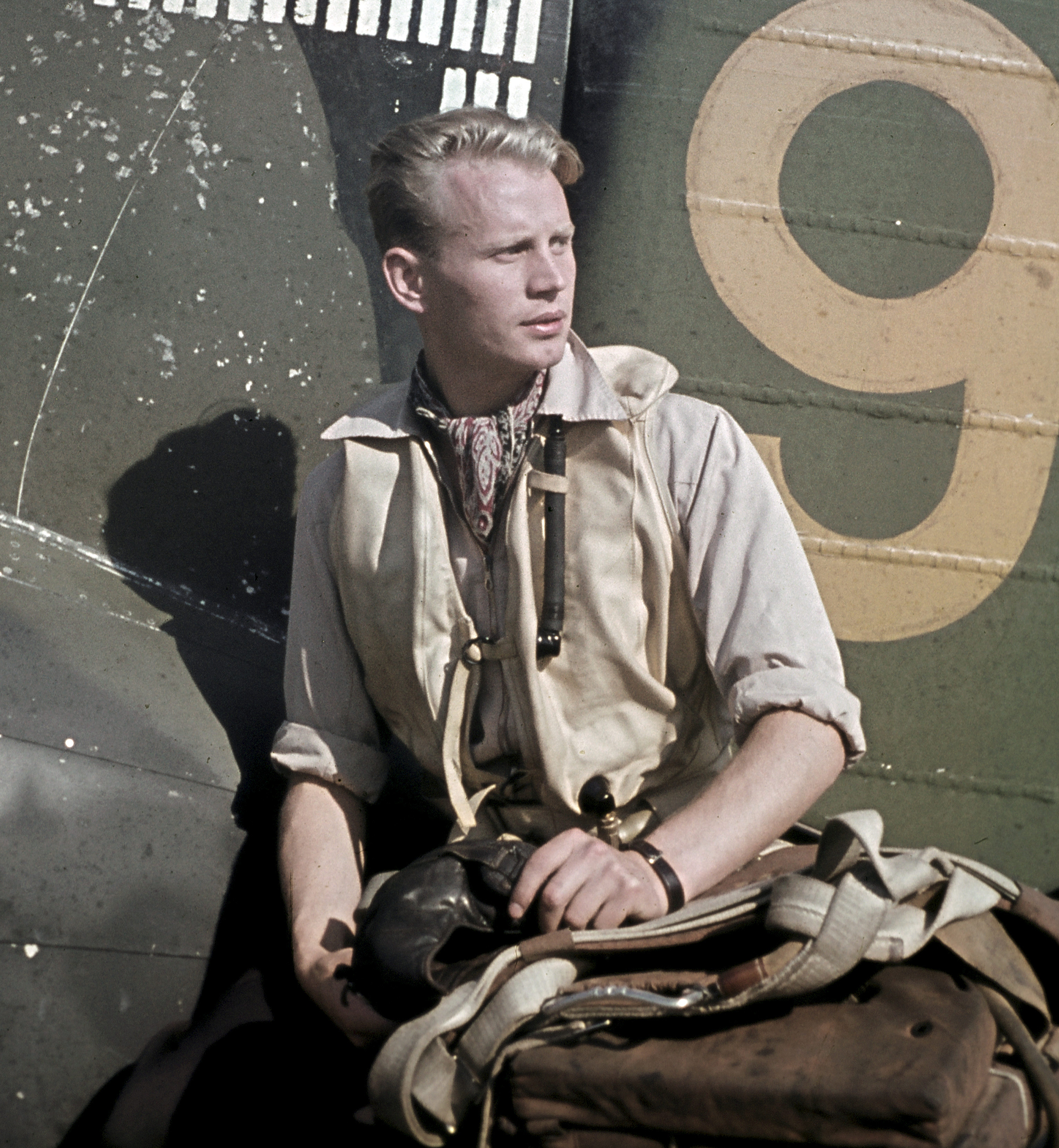
Hans Wind, two-time ace in a day

===== 1940 =====
- On 17 May 1940, Max Bucholz, a German Oberleutnant of 1./JG 3 shot down four RAF Bristol Blenheims, a Hawker Hurricane and a French Curtis Hawk 75. These were his first victories. On 13 July 1941, he again claimed five aerial victories on the Eastern Front.
- On 5 October 1940, then again on 6 November 1940, Helmut Wick, Luftwaffe fighter pilot on Western Front, twice became an ace in a day.

===== 1941 =====
- On 9 July 1941, then again on 19 August 1942, Siegfried Schnell, Luftwaffe fighter pilot on Western Front, twice became an ace in a day, with six and five victories, respectively.
- On 9 July 1941, then again on 23 July 1941, Kurt Sochatzy, Luftwaffe fighter pilot on the Eastern Front, twice became an ace in a day.
- On 12 July 1941, then again on 12 December 1942, Georg Schentke, Luftwaffe fighter pilot on the Eastern Front, became a two-time ace in a day, claiming five and six aerial victories respectively.
- On 2 August 1941, then again on 16 September 1941, Heinrich Hoffmann, Luftwaffe fighter pilot on the Eastern Front, twice became an ace in a day.
- On 17 August 1941, then again on 26 July 1942, Walter Ohlrogge, Luftwaffe fighter pilot on the Eastern Front, twice became an ace in a day.

===== 1942 =====
- On 16 March 1942, then again on 5 April 1942, Wolfgang Späte, Luftwaffe fighter pilot on the Eastern Front, twice became an ace in a day.
- On 19 March 1942, then again on 16 September 1942, Heinrich Setz, Luftwaffe fighter pilot on the Eastern Front, twice became an ace in a day.
- On 31 March 1942, then again on 5 April 1942, Friedrich Beckh, Luftwaffe fighter pilot on the Eastern Front, became a two-time ace in a day, claiming five and six aerial victories respectively.
- On 20 April 1942, then again on 25 April 1942, Friedrich Geißhardt, Luftwaffe fighter pilot on the Eastern Front, became a two-time ace in a day, claiming five and seven aerial victories respectively.
- On 23 April 1942, then again on 27 September 1942, Rudolf Müller, Luftwaffe fighter pilot on the Eastern Front, became a two-time ace in a day, claiming five and six aerial victories respectively.
- On 2 May 1942, then again on 8 May 1942, Leopold Steinbatz, Luftwaffe fighter pilot on the Eastern Front, became a two-time ace in a day, claiming six and seven aerial victories respectively.
- On 8 May 1942, then again on 13 May 1942, Friedrich Bruckmann, Luftwaffe fighter pilot on the Eastern Front, became a two-time ace in a day, claiming six and five aerial victories respectively.
- On 14 May 1942, then again on 28 September 1942, Karl Gratz, Luftwaffe fighter pilot on the Eastern Front, became a two-time ace in a day, claiming nine and five aerial victories respectively.
- On 22 June 1942, then again on 5 September 1942, Hans Dammers, Luftwaffe fighter pilot on the Eastern Front, twice became an ace in a day.
- On 7 July 1942, then again on 9 August 1942, Joachim Wandel, Luftwaffe fighter pilot on the Eastern Front, twice became ace in a day, claiming six and five aerial victories respectively.
- On 23 July 1942, then again on 7 August 1942, Waldemar Semelka, Luftwaffe fighter pilot on the Eastern Front, twice became an ace in a day.
- On 24 July 1942, then again on 13 August 1942, Johann Badum, Luftwaffe fighter pilot on the Eastern Front, twice became an ace in a day.
- On 23 August 1942, then again on 30 August 1942, Johannes Steinhoff, Luftwaffe fighter pilot on the Eastern Front, twice became an ace in a day.
- On 23 August 1942, then again on 5 March 1943, Hans Beißwenger, Luftwaffe fighter pilot on the Eastern Front, twice became an ace in a day.
- On 22 September 1942, then again on 29 November 1942, Josef Zwernemann, Luftwaffe fighter pilot on the Eastern Front, became a two-time ace in a day, claiming six and five aerial victories respectively.
- On 17 December 1942, then again on 23 February 1943, Günther Schack, Luftwaffe fighter pilot on the Eastern Front, twice became an ace in a day.

===== 1943 =====
- On 14 January 1943, then again on 14 September 1944, Fritz Tegtmeier, Luftwaffe fighter pilot on the Eastern Front, twice became an ace in a day with five and six victories, respectively.
- On 11 April 1943, then again on 10 May 1943, Wolf-Udo Ettel, Luftwaffe fighter pilot on the Eastern Front, twice became an ace in a day.
- On 5 May 1943, then again on 6 May 1943, Heinz Leber, Luftwaffe fighter pilot on the Eastern Front, became a two-time ace in a day, claiming five and six aerial victories respectively.
- On 30 May 1943, then again on 22 July 1943, Werner Quast, Luftwaffe fighter pilot on the Eastern Front, twice became an ace in a day, claiming five and six victories respectively.
- On 10 June 1943, then again on 5 July 1943, Max-Hermann Lücke, Luftwaffe fighter pilot on the Eastern Front, twice became an ace in a day, twice with seven victories.
- On 5 July 1943, then again on 4 August 1943, Karl-Heinz Weber, Luftwaffe fighter pilot on the Eastern Front, twice became an ace in a day.
- On 5 July 1943, then again on 14 August 1943, Horst-Günther von Fassong, Luftwaffe fighter pilot on the Eastern Front, twice became an ace in a day.
- On 5 July 1943, then again on 20 October 1943, Johannes Wiese, Luftwaffe fighter pilot on the Eastern Front, twice became an ace in a day, claiming twelve and seven aerial victories respectively.
- On 2 August 1943, then again on 8 October 1943, Heinrich Sterr, Luftwaffe fighter pilot on the Eastern Front, twice became an ace in a day, claiming seven and six victories respectively.
- On 14 August 1943, then again on 26 September 1943, Otto Gaiser, Luftwaffe fighter pilot on the Eastern Front, twice became an ace in a day.
- On 14 August 1943, then again on 15 August 1944, Kurt Dombacher, Luftwaffe fighter pilot on the Eastern Front, twice became an ace in a day.
- On 5 November 1943, then again on 16 February 1944, Heinz Wernicke, Luftwaffe fighter pilot on the Eastern Front, twice became an ace in a day.

===== 1944 =====
- On 13 March 1944, then again on 7 April 1944, Andreas Sterl, Luftwaffe fighter pilot on the Eastern Front, became a two-time ace in a day, with five, and seven victories, respectively.
- On 11 April 1944, then again on 4 May 1944, Helmut Bergmann, a Luftwaffe night fighter pilot, became a two-time ace in a day, with seven and five victories, respectively.
- On 11 April 1944, then again on 7 May 1944, potentially on 1 November 1944 as well, Peter Düttmann, Luftwaffe fighter pilot on the Eastern Front, became a two-time ace in a day, with six, nine and five victories, respectively.
- On 4 May 1944, then again on 22 May 1944, Martin Drewes, Luftwaffe night fighter pilot on the Western Front, became a two-time ace in a day, with six and nine victories, respectively.
- On 7 May 1944, then again on 8 June 1944, Heinz Sachsenberg, Luftwaffe fighter pilot on the Eastern Front, became a two-time ace in a day, with six and five victories, respectively.
- On 25 May 1944, then again on 21 February 1945, Heinz-Wolfgang Schnaufer, a Luftwaffe night fighter pilot, became a two-time ace in a day, with five and nine victories, respectively.
- On 17 June 1944, then again on 28 June 1944 and potentially on 16 September 1944, Heinz Arnold, Luftwaffe fighter pilot on the Eastern Front, became a two-time, potentially three-time, ace in a day, with nine, six and five victories, respectively.
- On 17 and 28 June 1944, Helmut Neumann, Luftwaffe fighter pilot on the Eastern Front, became a two-time ace in a day, with eight and six victories, respectively.
- On 19 June 1944, then again on 24 October 1944, Commander David McCampbell, the USN's top ace and Medal of Honor recipient, became a two-time ace in a day, with seven victories during the "Marianas Turkey Shoot", followed by nine victories on the second date.
- On 20 and 25 June 1944, Hans Wind, Finland's second highest scoring fighter ace, became a two-time ace in a day, with five victories both days. This was part of his 13-day tally, from 13 June to 25 June, of 29 aerial victories fighting against the Soviet Summer Offensive. His final World War II tally was 75.
- On 30 June 1944, then again on 5 March 1945, Ulrich Wernitz, Luftwaffe fighter pilot on the Eastern Front, became a two-time ace in a day, with five and eight victories, respectively.
- On 31 August 1944, then again on 16 October 1944, Adolf Nehring, Luftwaffe fighter pilot on the Eastern Front, became a two-time ace in a day, with six and five victories, respectively.
- On 14 September 1944, then again on 22 December 1944, Gerhard Thyben, Luftwaffe fighter pilot on the Eastern Front, twice became an ace in a day, with six and five victories, respectively.
- On 7 October 1944, then again on 24 October 1944, Heinz Marquardt, Luftwaffe fighter pilot on the Eastern Front, became a two-time ace in a day, with eight and five victories, respectively.
- On 13 and 24 October 1944, Johannes Keller, Luftwaffe fighter pilot on the Eastern Front, became a two-time ace in a day.

===== 1945 =====
- On the night of 7/8 February 1945, then again on the night of 15/16 March 1945, Gerhard Raht, Luftwaffe night fighter pilot, became a two-time ace in a day, with six and five victories respectively.

=== Ace in a day ===
==== 1940 ====
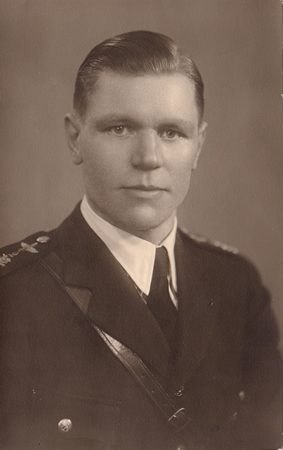
Jorma Sarvanto, ace in a day on 6 January 1940

- On 6 January 1940, Jorma Sarvanto, a Finnish lieutenant, destroyed six Soviet DB-3 bombers in four minutes on one flight, which is the fastest time ever anyone became ace in day with a propeller plane. Sarvanto was the top scoring pilot in the Winter War, with 13 kills. He also scored 4 kills in Continuation War, making a total of 17 kills.
- On 14 May 1940, Hans-Karl Mayer, Luftwaffe fighter pilot on Western Front, became an ace in a day.
- On 29 May 1940 during the Dunkirk evacuation, RAF turret gunner Corporal Albert Lippett and his pilot, Flight Lieutenant Nicholas Gresham Cooke, claimed two Messerschmitt Bf 109 fighters and a Messerschmitt Bf 110 fighter during their first sortie, then added five Junkers Ju 87 bombers in their second that day, becoming Britain's first aces in a day in the Second World War. Both men would die when their Boulton Paul Defiant was shot down on 31 May as they continued to protect the ships and troops at the beach.
- On 5 June 1940, Wilhelm Balthasar, Luftwaffe fighter pilot on the Western Front, shot down five French aircraft.
- On 15 June 1940, Pierre Le Gloan of the French Air Force destroyed five Italian aircraft in one flight.
- On 24 August 1940, Antoni Głowacki, flying with a Polish Squadron in the RAF, (in duty fight R.A.F. 501 (Hawker Hurricane) Squadron shot down three Bf 109s and two Junkers Ju 88 bombers over Ramsgate, to become the first ace in a day of the Battle of Britain.
- Also on 24 August 1940, RAF pilot Ronald Hamlyn shot down five aircraft, flying a Spitfire with 610 Squadron.
- On 31 August 1940, Brian Carbury, a New Zealand flying officer, claimed three Bf 109s and two He 111s in three sorties.
- On 27 September 1940, Albert Gerald Lewis, a South African pilot officer, claimed six German aircraft (three Bf 109s, two Bf 110s and one Ju 88) destroyed, along with two probables and one damaged.
- On 7 October 1940, Archie McKellar. of the RAF shot down five Messerschmitt Bf 109s during the Battle of Britain.
- On 11 December 1940, within six minutes, Charles Dyson of the RAF's No 33 Squadron destroyed six Italian Cr42s.

==== 1941 ====
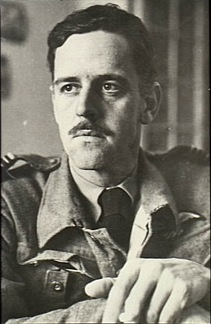
Clive Caldwell, ace in a day on 5 December 1941.

- On 24 June 1941, Ottmar Maurer, Luftwaffe fighter pilot on the Eastern Front, became an ace in a day.
- On 24 June 1941, Edmund Wagner, Luftwaffe fighter pilot on the Eastern Front, became an ace in a day.
- On 25 June 1941, Hans Kolbow, Luftwaffe fighter pilot on the Eastern Front, became an ace in a day.
- On 26 June 1941, Reinhold Schmetzer of Luftwaffe JG 77 shot down 5 Ilyushin DB-3s.
- On 26 June 1941, Robert Olejnik, Luftwaffe fighter pilot on the Eastern Front, became an ace in a day.
- On 30 June 1941, Hermann-Friedrich Joppien, Luftwaffe fighter pilot on the Eastern Front, became an ace in a day.
- On 23 July 1941, Erich Leie, Luftwaffe fighter pilot on the Western Front, became an ace in a day.
- On 23 July 1941, Rudolf Pflanz, Luftwaffe fighter pilot on the Western Front, became an ace in a day.
- On 26 July 1941, Erich Schmidt, Luftwaffe fighter pilot on the Eastern Front, became an ace in a day.
- On 11 August 1941, Eugen Wintergerst, Luftwaffe fighter pilot on the Eastern Front, claimed seven aerial victories.
- On 14 August 1941, Erbo Graf von Kageneck, Luftwaffe fighter pilot on the Eastern Front, became an ace in a day.
- On 25 August 1941, Stefan Litjens, Luftwaffe fighter pilot on the Eastern Front, became an ace in a day.
- On 17 September 1941, Karl Kempf, Luftwaffe fighter pilot on the Eastern Front, became an ace in a day.
- On 26 September 1941, Heinz Hackler, Luftwaffe fighter pilot on the Eastern Front, became an ace in a day.
- On 8 October 1941, Günther Lützow, Luftwaffe fighter pilot on the Eastern Front, became an ace in a day.
- On 5 December 1941, within a few minutes, Clive Caldwell, the leading Australian ace of the Second World War, destroyed five German aircraft in North Africa.

==== 1942 ====
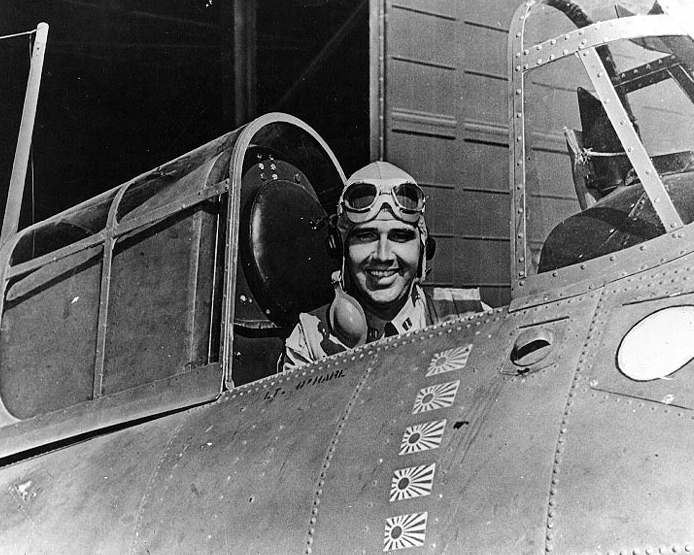
Edward O'Hare, ace in a day on 20 February 1942

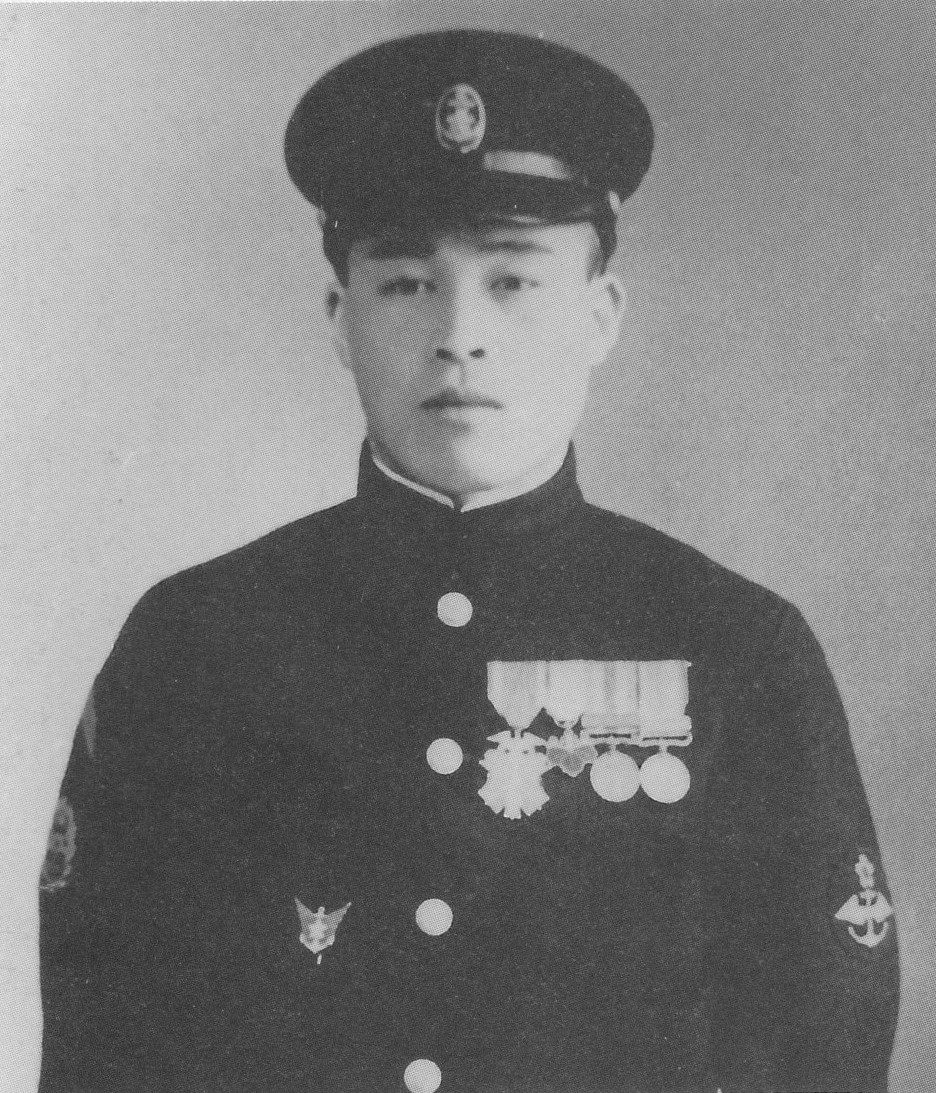
Shigetaka Ōmori, ace in a day on 4 June 1942

- On 15 February 1942, Otto Schulz, Luftwaffe fighter pilot in North Africa, became an ace in a day.
- On 19 February 1942, while flying Mitsubishi A6M Zero fighter during the Attack on Darwin, Petty Officer Yoshikazu Nagahama first destroyed one US Navy PBY Catalina flying boat and then single-handedly shot down four US Army Air Force P-40 Warhawk fighters in a fight against five of them.
- On 20 February 1942, after the aborted raid on Rabaul, Edward O'Hare claimed shooting down five Mitsubishi G4M medium bombers of the 4th Air Group. While he was officially credited with five kills and received Medal of Honor for his action, in reality he most likely only shot down three of them.
- On 18 March 1942, Hans Strelow, Luftwaffe fighter pilot on the Eastern Front, claimed seven aerial victories and became an ace in a day.
- On 2 May 1942, Gerhard Köppen, Luftwaffe fighter pilot on the Eastern Front, became an ace in a day.
- On 10 May 1942, Willi Pfränger, Luftwaffe fighter pilot on the Eastern Front, became an ace in a day.
- On 14 May 1942, Friedrich Wachowiak, Luftwaffe fighter pilot on the Eastern Front, became an ace in a day.
- On 4 June 1942, while escorting the morning strike against Midway Island, Petty Officer Shigetaka Ōmori claimed shooting down two US Marine fighters. After he returned to the carrier Akagi, he and his unit took off again to intercept US Navy strike and claimed shooting down six Douglas TBD Devastator torpedo bombers. Nevertheless, some of the bomber kills might have been shared.
- On 4 June 1942, during the Battle of Midway, US Navy Lieutenant (jg) Elbert S. McCuskey was credited for destroying three Aichi D3A dive bombers during the Japanese first attack on the carrier Yorktown. When Yorktown was hit by the same attack, he landed on Enterprise, rearmed his Grumman F4F Wildcat fighter and took off to defend Yorktown against the second attack, during which he claimed two Nakajima B5N torpedo bombers.
- On 5 June 1942, Josef Wurmheller, Luftwaffe fighter pilot on the Western Front, became an ace in a day.
- On 22 June 1942, Erwin Leykauf, Luftwaffe fighter pilot on the Eastern Front, became an ace in a day.
- On 26 June 1942, Friedrich Körner, Luftwaffe fighter pilot in North Africa, became an ace in a day.
- On 5 July 1942, Ralph Furch, Luftwaffe fighter pilot on the Eastern Front, became an ace in a day.
- On 5 July 1942, Hartmann Grasser, Luftwaffe fighter pilot on the Eastern Front, became an ace in a day.
- On 5 July 1942, Karl Rammelt, Luftwaffe fighter pilot on the Eastern and Western Front, became an ace in a day.
- On 12 July 1942, Lutz-Wilhelm Burckhardt, Luftwaffe fighter pilot on the Eastern Front, became an ace in a day.
- On 24 July 1942, Leopold Münster, Luftwaffe fighter pilot on the Eastern Front, became an ace in a day.
- On 1 August 1942, Franz-Josef Beerenbrock, Luftwaffe fighter pilot on the Eastern Front, claimed nine aerial victories.
- On 6 August 1942, Alexander Preinfalk, Luftwaffe fighter pilot on the Eastern and Western Front, claimed six aerial victories.
- On 7 August 1942, Hans Fuß, Luftwaffe fighter pilot on the Eastern Front, claimed six aerial victories.
- On 12 August 1942, Richard John Cork of the Royal Navy's Fleet Air Arm shot down five aircraft during the defence of a Malta Convoy in Operation Pedestal.
- On 12 August 1942, Karl-Heinz Bendert, Luftwaffe fighter pilot in North Africa, became an ace in a day.
- On 13 August 1942, Johann Badum, Luftwaffe fighter pilot on the Eastern Front, became an ace in a day. He may have already become an ace in a day on 24 July 1942. He claimed six aerial victories on 24 and 25 July. According to Matthews and Foreman, all six claims were dated on 24 July. According to Prien, Stemmer, Rodeike and Bock, he claimed four on 24 July and two on 25 July.
- On 13 August 1942, Walter Zellot, Luftwaffe fighter pilot on the Eastern Front, became an ace in a day.
- On 19 August 1942, Josef Wurmheller, Luftwaffe fighter pilot on the Western Front, became an ace in a day.
- On 20 August 1942, Heinrich Graf von Einsiedel, Luftwaffe fighter pilot on the Eastern Front, became an ace in a day.
- On 3 September 1942, Hans-Arnold Stahlschmidt, Luftwaffe fighter pilot in North Africa, became an ace in a day, with five victories.
- On 15 September 1942, Werner Schröer, Luftwaffe fighter pilot in North Africa, became an ace in a day, with six victories.
- On 20 September 1942, Hans Roehrig, Luftwaffe fighter pilot on the Eastern Front, became an ace in a day.
- On 22 September 1942, Heinrich Bartels, Luftwaffe fighter pilot on the Eastern Front, became an ace in a day.
- On 29 September 1942, Rudolf Klemm, Luftwaffe fighter pilot on the Eastern Front, became an ace in a day.
- On 25 October 1942, Captain Joe Foss, USMC VMF-121, downed five Japanese planes in two sorties during the Guadalcanal Campaign while flying a Grumman F4F Wildcat. Foss was the second highest scoring Marine ace of the war with 26 victories and was awarded the Medal of Honor. He was also the first Marine to claim ace in a day.
- On 26 October 1942, Stanley "Swede" Vejtasa, a United States Navy (USN) aviator, downed seven Japanese planes in one sortie in the Battle of Santa Cruz while flying a Grumman F4F Wildcat.
- On 28 October 1942, Helmut Rüffler Luftwaffe fighter pilot on the Eastern Front, became an ace in a day.
- On 1 November 1942, Hubertus von Bonin Luftwaffe fighter pilot on the Eastern Front, became an ace in a day.
- On 16 December 1942, Wilhelm Freuwörth Luftwaffe fighter pilot on the Eastern Front, became an ace in a day when he claimed six aerial victories over Soviet Ilyushin Il-2 ground-attack aircraft.
- On 19 December 1942, Kurt Ebener Luftwaffe fighter pilot on the Eastern Front, became an ace in a day.
- On 28 December 1942, Helmut Bennemann Luftwaffe fighter pilot on the Eastern Front, became an ace in a day.

==== 1943 ====
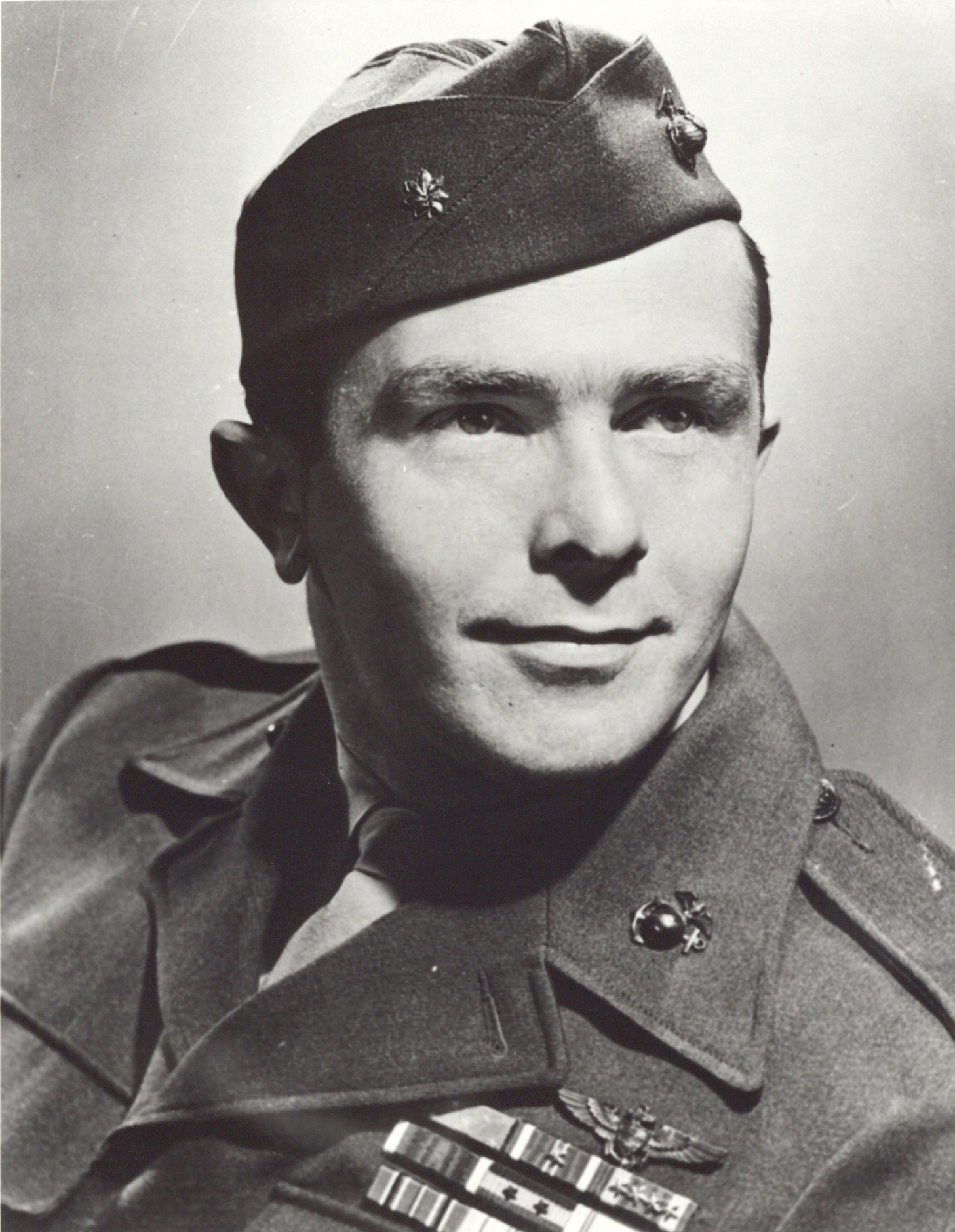
James E. Swett, ace in a day on 7 April 1943

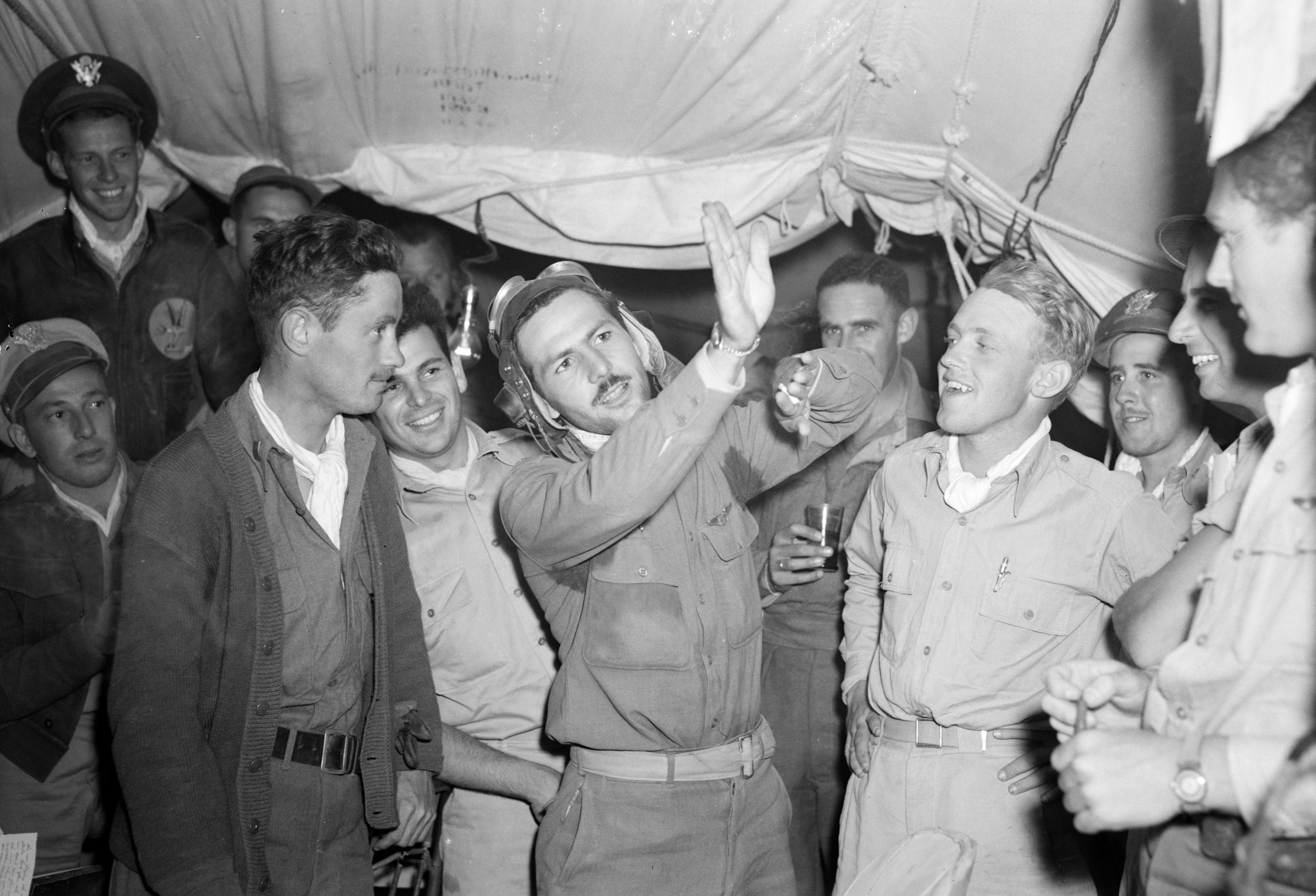
MacArthur Powers (left) and Richard E. Duffey, both ace in a day on 18 April 1943

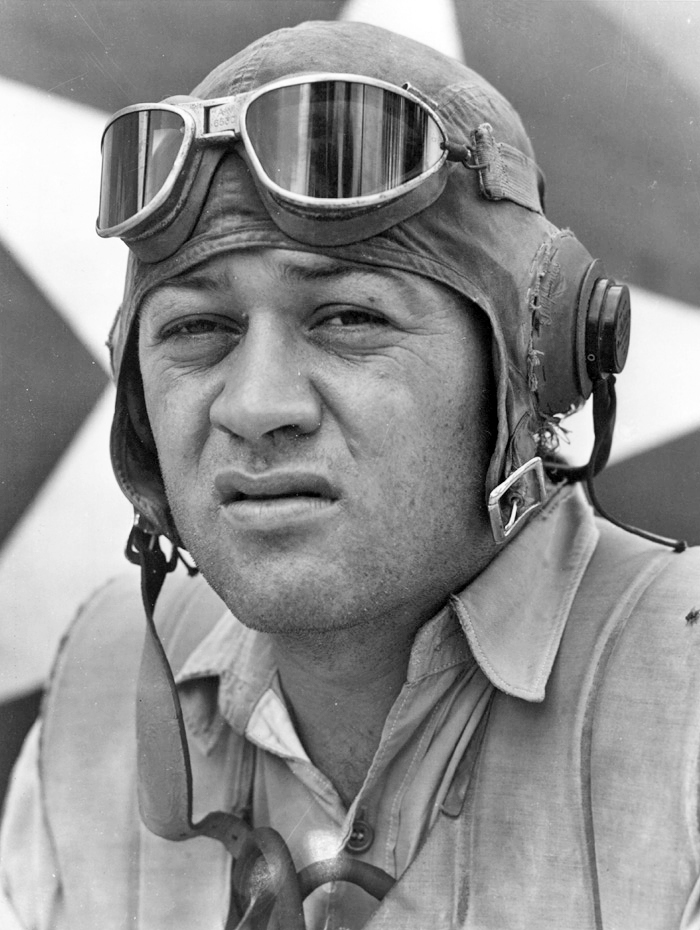
Pappy Boyington, ace in a day on 16 September 1943

- On 14 January 1943, Alfred Teumer, Luftwaffe fighter pilot on the Eastern Front, became an ace in a day.
- On 31 January 1943, Captain Jefferson DeBlanc, USMC VMF-112, scored five victories in the Guadalcanal Campaign. His actions, despite mechanical problems with his aircraft and being vastly outnumbered, earned him the Medal of Honor.
- On 2 February 1943, Kurt Bühligen, Luftwaffe fighter pilot on the Western Front, became an ace in a day.
- On 12 February 1943, Gustav Denk, Luftwaffe fighter pilot on the Eastern Front, became an ace in a day.
- On 7 March 1943, Walter Hoeckner of Luftwaffe JG 26 shot down 4 Ilyushin Il-2 Shturmoviks and 2 P-40C Tomahawks.
- On 7 April 1943, 1st Lieutenant James E. Swett, USMC VMF-221, scored seven victories fighting against the Japanese Operation I-Go offensive. His actions that day earned him the Medal of Honor.
- On 18 April 1943, 2nd Lieutenants Arthur B. Cleaveland, Richard E. Duffy, and MacArthur Powers, USAAF 57th FG, all claimed five Ju 52 transports over the Mediterranean.
- On 13 May 1943, Archie Donahue engaged in a one hour long dogfight west of Florida Island. Donahue possibly became an ace in a day, as he was confirmed to have shot down four Zeros, and most likely shot down a fifth. A fellow Marine verified the fifth kill, but Donahue was never credited for it. also see April 12, 1945. Had it been confirmed, this would have been the first every ace in a day by a carrier based pilot.
- On 26 May 1943, Walter Ehle, Luftwaffe night fighter pilot on the Western Front, became an ace in a day.
- On 10 June 1943, Hans Pfähler, Luftwaffe fighter pilot on the Eastern Front, became an ace in a day.
- On 12 June 1943, Lieutenant (JG) Vernon E. Graham, USNR, with a F4F Wildcat carrier fighter unit that intercepted 35 A6M Zero fighters, shot down 5 Zeroes, ran out of fuel mid-combat, and made a dead-stick landing on Pavuvu.
- On 16 June 1943, 2nd Lieutenant Murray J. Shubin, USAAF 347th FG, shot down five Zeroes near Guadalcanal.
- On 22 June 1943, Hans-Dieter Frank, Luftwaffe night fighter pilot on the Western Front, became an ace in a day.
- On 1 July 1943, Captain Elmer M. Wheadon, USAAF 318 FG, shot down five Japanese planes.
- On 5 July 1943, Johann-Hermann Meier, Luftwaffe fighter pilot on the Eastern Front, became an ace in a day.
- On 5 July 1943, Rudolf Rademacher, Luftwaffe fighter pilot on the Eastern Front, became an ace in a day.
- On 5 July 1943, Emil Bitsch, Luftwaffe fighter pilot on the Eastern Front, became an ace in a day.
- On 5 July 1943, Hans Grünberg, Luftwaffe fighter pilot on the Eastern Front, became an ace in a day.
- On 6 July 1943, Anton Döbele, Luftwaffe fighter pilot on the Eastern Front, became an ace in a day.
- On 13 July 1943, Wilhelm Moritz, Luftwaffe fighter pilot on the Eastern and Western Front, became an ace in a day.
- On 15 July 1943, 1st Lieutenant Joseph J. Lesicka, USAAF 318th FG, downed five Japanese planes in the Pacific Theater.
- On 28 July 1943, Wilhelm Theimann, Luftwaffe fighter pilot on the Eastern Front, became an ace in a day.
- On 14 August 1943, Otto Gaiser, Luftwaffe fighter pilot on the Eastern Front, became an ace in a day.
- On 21 August 1943, Johannes Bunzek, Luftwaffe fighter pilot on the Eastern Front, became an ace in a day.
- On 7 September 1943, Albin Wolf, Luftwaffe fighter pilot on the Eastern Front, became an ace in a day.
- On 16 September 1943, Major Pappy Boyington, USMC VMF-214, scored five victories over the Solomon Islands while flying an F4U Corsair. A Medal of Honor recipient, Boyington was the top scoring Marine fighter pilot during the war, shooting down a total of 28 Japanese aircraft before he too was shot down and captured in January 1944.
- On 19 September 1943, Friedrich Obleser, Luftwaffe fighter pilot on the Eastern Front, became an ace in a day.
- On 8 October 1943, Helmut Lipfert, Luftwaffe fighter pilot on the Eastern, became an ace in a day.
- On 9 October 1943, Major William L. Leverette and 2nd Lieutenant Harry T. Hanna, USAAF 14th FG, both became aces in a day over the Aegean Sea with seven and five Stuka victories, respectively. Leverette was awarded the Distinguished Service Cross and was the first of just two Army Air Forces pilots to claim seven victories in a single mission.
- On 10 October 1943, Walter Krupinski, Luftwaffe fighter pilot on the Eastern, became an ace in a day.
- On 11 October 1943, Colonel Neel. E. Kearby, USAAF 343rd FG, shot down six Japanese planes, four Ki-43 "Oscar" and two Ki-61 "Tony", during one mission in his P-47 "Fiery Ginger", becoming the first P-47 pacific ace, the first P-47 ace in day and setting a United States Army Air Forces record for most victories in a single mission in the Pacific Theater. He was awarded the Medal of Honor for this mission, which was presented to him by General Douglas MacArthur in January 1944.
- On 12 October 1943, Horst Ademeit, Luftwaffe fighter pilot on the Eastern Front, claimed six aerial victories.
- On 27 October 1943, Alois Lechner, Luftwaffe night fighter pilot on the Eastern Front, became an ace in a day.
- On 2 November 1943, Paul-Heinrich Dähne, Luftwaffe fighter pilot on the Eastern Front, claimed five aerial victories.
- On 1 December 1943, Egon Mayer, Luftwaffe fighter pilot on the Western Front, became an ace in a day.
- On 15 December 1943, Diethelm von Eichel-Streiber, Luftwaffe fighter pilot on the Eastern Front, claimed six aerial victories plus two further unconfirmed claims.
- On 15 December 1943, Konrad Bauer, Luftwaffe fighter pilot on the Eastern Front, claimed six aerial victories.
- On 20 December 1943, Wilhelm Herget, Luftwaffe night fighter pilot on the Western Front, claimed eight aerial victories.

==== 1944 ====
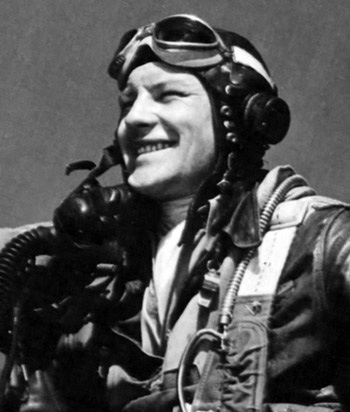
Fred J. Christensen, ace in a day on 7 July 1944

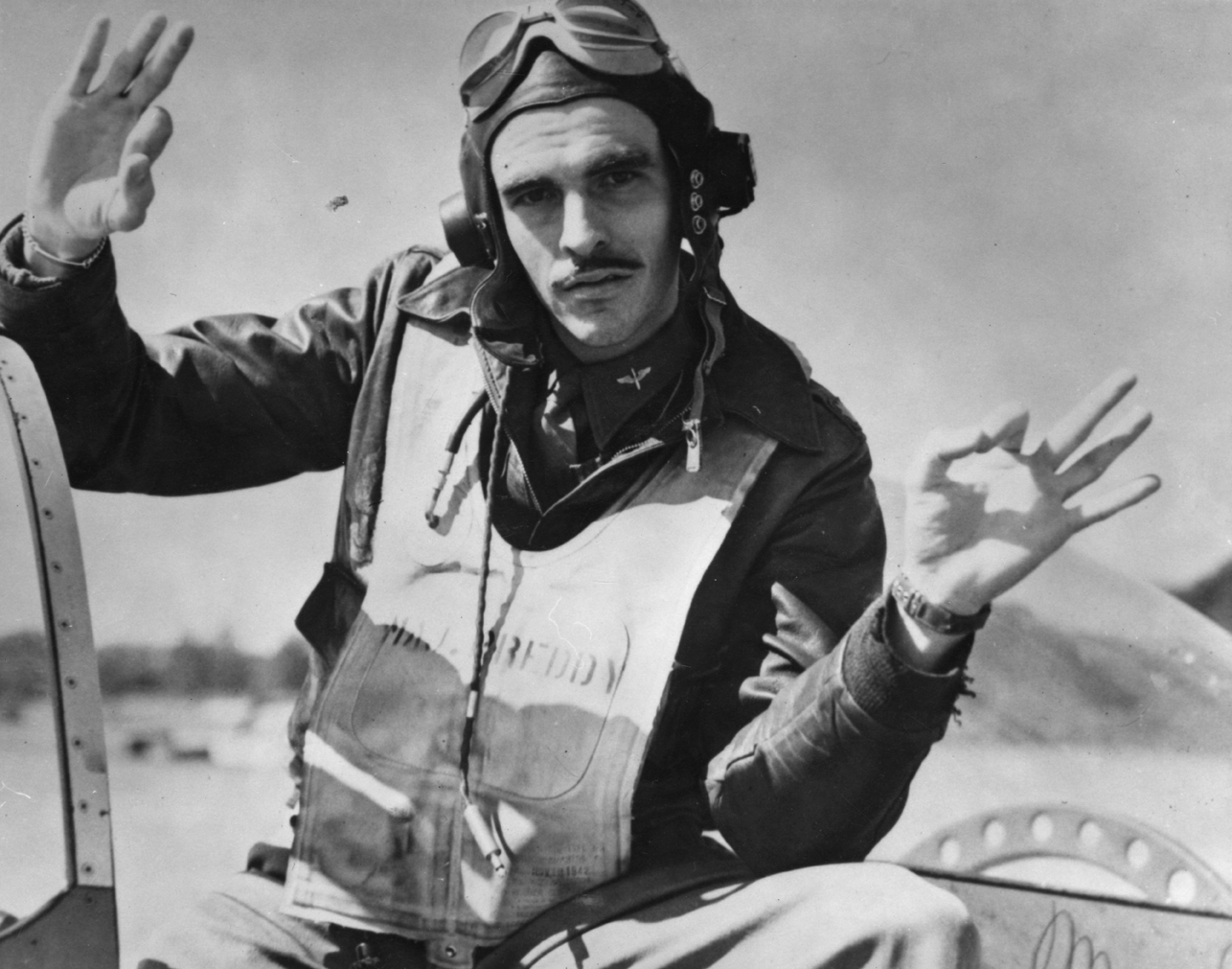
George Preddy, ace in a day on 6 August 1944

- On 14 January 1944, 1st Lieutenant Robert M. Hanson, USMC VMF-215, scored five victories over the Solomon Islands area while flying an F4U Corsair. He was shot down and killed less than one month later. He claimed 25 kills during the war.
- On 14 January 1944, Wendelin Breukel, a Luftwaffe night fighter pilot, shot down six Avro Lancasters.
- On 20 January 1944, Leopold Fellerer, a Luftwaffe night fighter pilot, became an ace in a day.
- On 20 February 1944, Rudolf Frank, a German Feldwebel shot down five Avro Lancasters over Germany.
- On 20 February 1944, Heinz Vinke, a Luftwaffe night fighter pilot, became an ace in a day.
- On 21 February 1944, Otto Würfel, a Luftwaffe fighter pilot on the Eastern Front, became an ace in a day.
- On 20 March 1944, August Mors, a Luftwaffe fighter pilot on the Eastern Front, became an ace in a day.
- On 29 March 1944, Walther Wever, a Luftwaffe fighter pilot on the Eastern Front, became an ace in a day.
- On 23 April 1944, Horst Berger, a Luftwaffe fighter pilot on the Eastern Front, became an ace in a day.
- On 7 May 1944 Hans Waldmann of the Luftwaffe shot down six Soviet aircraft, taking his total to 120 aerial victories.
- On 7 May 1944, Friedrich Haas, Luftwaffe fighter pilot on the Eastern Front, became an ace in a day.
- On 8 May 1944, 1st Lieutenant Carl J. Luksic, USAAF 352nd FG, shot down three Fw 190s and two Bf 109s in one sortie out of his total of 7 solo and 3 shared victories. He was captured 2 weeks after on the 24th.
- On 12 May 1944, 1st Lieutenant Robert J. Rankin, USAAF 56th FG, shot down five planes over Germany. He finished the war with 10 victories.
- On 30 May 1944, Otto Fönnekold, Luftwaffe fighter pilot on the Eastern Front, shot down seven Bell P-39 Airacobra fighter aircraft.
- On 6 June 1944, Herbert Huppertz, Luftwaffe fighter pilot on the Western Front, shot down three Hawker Typhoon, one North American P-51 Mustang and one Republic P-47 Thunderbolt fighter aircraft to become an ace in a day.
- On 10 June 1944, 2nd Lieutenant Herbert B. Hatch Jr., USAAF 1st FG, shot down five enemy planes, probably destroyed a sixth and damaged another over Rumania.
- On 15 June 1944, Lieutenant Lloyd G 'Barney' Barnard, USN VF-2, shot down five Japanese Zero fighters in a single mission off the Bonin Islands.
- On 19 June 1944, Helmut Grollmus, Luftwaffe fighter pilot on the Eastern Front, became an ace in a day, claiming six aerial victories.
- On 19 June 1944, Commander Charles W. Brewer, USN VF-15 (five); Lieutenants George R. Carr, USN VF-15 (five); Alexander Vraciu, USN VF-16 (six); and Ensign Wilbur 'Spider' Webb, USN VF-17 (six+); all became aces in a day over Guam in a single mission.
- On 23 June 1944, Wilhelm Hübner, Luftwaffe fighter pilot on the Eastern Front, became an ace in a day, claiming eight aerial victories.
- On 30 June 1944, Ilmari Juutilainen, Finland's top scoring fighter ace, shot down six Soviet planes flying against the same Soviet Summer Offensive as colleague and fellow ace in a day Wind. Juutilainen's final World War II score was 94, highest scoring non-German pilot ever.
- On 7 July 1944, Fred J. Christensen, USAAF 56th FG, attacked with his squadron 12 Junkers Ju 52 which were landing on Gardelegen airfield. Squadron claimed 10 destroyed, thereof Christensen claimed 6 and set record as first pilot in 8th Air Force and first American pilot in European Theatre to claim 6 kills in one day and in one sortie.
- On 21 July 1944, Sigurd Haala, Luftwaffe fighter pilot on the Eastern Front, became an ace in a day.
- On 6 August 1944, George Preddy, USAAF 352nd FG, shot down six German Bf 109s. He was the top USAAF P-51 Mustang ace (26.83 kills, including shared kills).
- On 9 August 1944, Heinz Busse, a Luftwaffe fighter pilot on the Eastern Front, became an ace in a day.
- On 5 September 1944, 1st Lieutenant William H. Allen, USAAF 55th FG, shot down five planes over Europe.
- On 13 September 1944, USN pilot Lieutenant Arthur Ray Hawkins shot down five Japanese planes in a sortie over the Philippines, becoming an ace in a day.
- On 14 September 1944, Franz Eisenach, Luftwaffe fighter pilot on the Eastern Front, became an ace in day with nine aerial victories claimed that day.
- On 27 September 1944, 1st Lieutenant William R. Beyer, USAAF 361st FG, shot down five Fw 190s in the vicinity of Eisenach. He ended war with 9 claims.
- On 28 September 1944, 2nd Lieutenant John H. Wainwright Jr., USAAF 405th FG, shot down six planes over Europe.
- On 12 October 1944, 1st Lieutenant Charles "Chuck" Yeager, USAAF 357th FG, shot down five Bf 109s in one sortie. He ended the war with 12 victories. On 14 October 1947, flying the Bell X-1 rocket plane, he became the first pilot to break the sound barrier in level flight.
- On 24 October 1944, Lieutenant Commander Harold N. Funk, USN VF-23 (five); Lieutenants Carl A. Brown Jr., USN VF-27 (five); Kenneth G. Hippe, USN VC-3 (five); William J. Masoner Jr., USN VF-19 (six); Roy W. Rushing, USN VF-15 (six+); James A. Shirley, USN VF-22 (five); Eugene P. Townsend, USN VF-27 (five+); and Ensign Thomas J. Conroy, USN VF-22 (six); all became aces in a day off the Philippines.
- On 2 November 1944, Donald S. Bryan, USAAF 352nd FG, shot down five German Bf 109s aircraft while en route to join and escort B-17 bombers on a mission to Germany.
- On 16 November 1944, Captain John J. Voll, USAAF 31st FG, shot down five planes over Germany.
- On 21 November 1944, Captain William T. Whisner, USAAF 352nd FG, shot down 6 Fw 190 and 1 probable. Fought in the Korean War and became 1 of 7 aces in two wars (16 solo kills and 1 shared in WW2; 6 solo and 1 shared in Korea).
- On 26 November 1944, 1st Lieutenant J. S. Daniell, USAAF 339th FG, shot down five planes over Germany.
- On 27 November 1944, Captain Leonard K. Carson, USAAF 357th FG, shot down 5 Fw 190. Ended war with 18 claims.
- On 4 December 1944, Major William J. Hovde, USAAF 355th FG, shot down four Fw 190s, one Bf 109, and shared one Fw 190 over Berlin.
- On 14 December 1944, Lieutenant Robert H. Anderson, USN VBF-80, shot down five Japanese planes and probably downed a sixth off the Philippines.
- On 18 December 1944, 1st Lieutenant David B. Archibald and 1st Lieutenant Paul E. Olson, USAAF 359th FG, both shot down five Fw 190s before they too were shot down and captured as prisoners of war.
- On 21 December 1944, Hans-Joachim Kroschinski, Luftwaffe fighter pilot on the Eastern Front, became an ace in a day
- On 23 December 1944, Lieutenant Colonel Edward O. McComas, USAAF 23rd FG, shot down five Japanese planes over China.
- On 23 December 1944, Lieutenant Colonel David C. Schilling, USAAF 56th FG, shot down three Bf 109s and two Fw 190s over Bonn.
- On 27 December 1944, Captain Ernest E. Bankey, USAAF 364th FG, shot down four Fw 190s and one Bf 109; and shared one Bf 109 in area of Bonn. Ended war with 9.5 claims.
- On 29 December 1944, within seven minutes, Richard Joseph "Dick" Audet of 411 Squadron RCAF, piloting a Spitfire IXe, destroyed two Bf 109s and three Focke-Wulf Fw 190s over Osnabrück.

==== 1945 ====
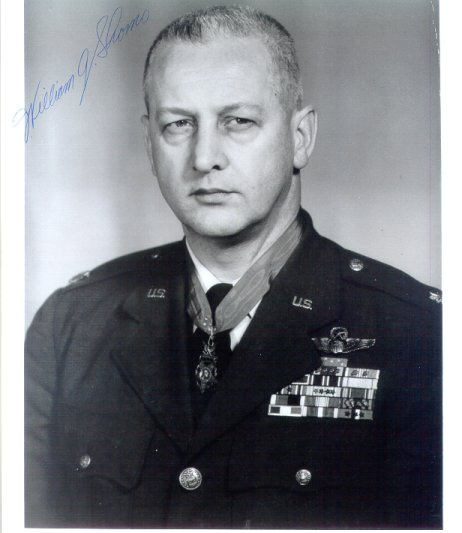
William A. Shomo, ace in a day on 11 January 1945

- On 3 January 1945, Heinz Ewald, Luftwaffe fighter pilot on the Eastern Front, claimed five aerial victories.
- On 11 January 1945, Captain William A. Shomo, USAAF 71st RG, shot down seven Japanese planes in a single mission over the Philippines and was awarded the Medal of Honor.
- On 14 January 1945, Captain Felix D. Williamson, USAAF 56th FG, shot down five German fighters in a single mission and was awarded the Distinguished Service Cross.
- On 16 February 1945, Lieutenant Alexander L. Anderson, USN VBF-80 (five); Lieutenant Patrick D. Fleming, USN VBF-80 (five); became aces in a day over Tokyo in a single mission.
- On the night of 21/22 February 1945, Günther Bahr, Luftwaffe night fighter pilot, became an ace in a day, when he shot down seven bombers.
- On 14 March 1945, 1st Lieutenant Gordon H. McDaniel, USAAF 325th FG, shot down five Fw 190s in the Mediterranean Theater of operations.
- On 15 March 1945, Ferdinand Löschenkohl, Luftwaffe fighter pilot on the Eastern Front, claimed five aerial victories.
- On 16 March 1945, Erich Jung, Luftwaffe night fighter pilot, became an ace in a day, claiming eight nocturnal aerial victories.
- On 18 March 1945, Lieutenant Commander Marshall U. Beebe, USN VF-17, shot down five Japanese fighters over Kyushu.
- On 21 March 1945, Johannes Hager, Luftwaffe fighter pilot on the Western Front, claimed five aerial victories.
- On 22 March 1945, Lieutenant Colonel Sidney S. Woods, USAAF 4th FG, shot down five Fw 190s over Germany. Woods had previously claimed two victories in the Pacific, these were his last claims of the war.
- On 24 March 1945, Major Robert A. Elder and Lieutenant Colonel Wayne K. Blickenstaff, USAAF 353rd FG, both became aces in a day over Germany. Elder shot down four Fw 190s, one Bf 109 and damaged one Fw 190; these were his only claims in the war. Blickenstaff, who was already an ace with five kills, destroyed two Fw 190s and three Bf 109s. These were his last claims in the war.
- On 2 April 1945, 1st Lieutenant Bruce W. Carr, USAAF 354th FG, shot down five planes and damaged a sixth over Germany.
- On 12 April 1945, Major Archie Donahue, USMC VMF-451, scored five victories over Okinawa. Donahue was already an ace with nine kills, these were his last claims of the war. This was the first ever official ace in a day by a carrier based f4u pilot.This was his second ace in a day, also see May 13, 1943
- On 17 April 1945, Lieutenant Commander Eugene Valencia, USN VF-9, shot down six Japanese planes over Okinawa.
- On 22 April 1945, three American USMC pilots of the VMF-323 "Death Rattlers" squadron, separately became aces in a day in the Battle of Okinawa: Major Jefferson Dorroh (six); Major George C. Axtell (five+); and 1st Lieutenant Jeremiah Joseph O'Keefe (five).
- On 25 May 1945, two American pilots separately became aces in a day over Okinawa: 1st Lieutenant Richard H. Anderson, USAAF 318th FG, downed five Zeros, and had a sixth in his sights when he ran out of ammunition; Captain Herbert J. Valentine, USMC VMF-312, downed five Japanese planes, making him the last Marine of the war to become an ace in a day.
- On 28 May 1945, Captain John E. Vogt, USAAF 318th FG, downed five Zeros over Kyushu, Japan. These were his only claims of the war.
- On 10 June 1945, 2nd Lieutenant Robert J. Stone, USAAF 318th FG, downed five Japanese aircraft over the Pacific.
- On 13 August 1945, becoming the last fighter ace of World War II just two days before the surrender of Japan, 1st Lieutenant Oscar Perdomo, USAAF 475th FG, scored all of his five career victories fighting a Japanese attack near Keijo (Seoul), Korea.

== Indo-Pakistani War of 1965 ==
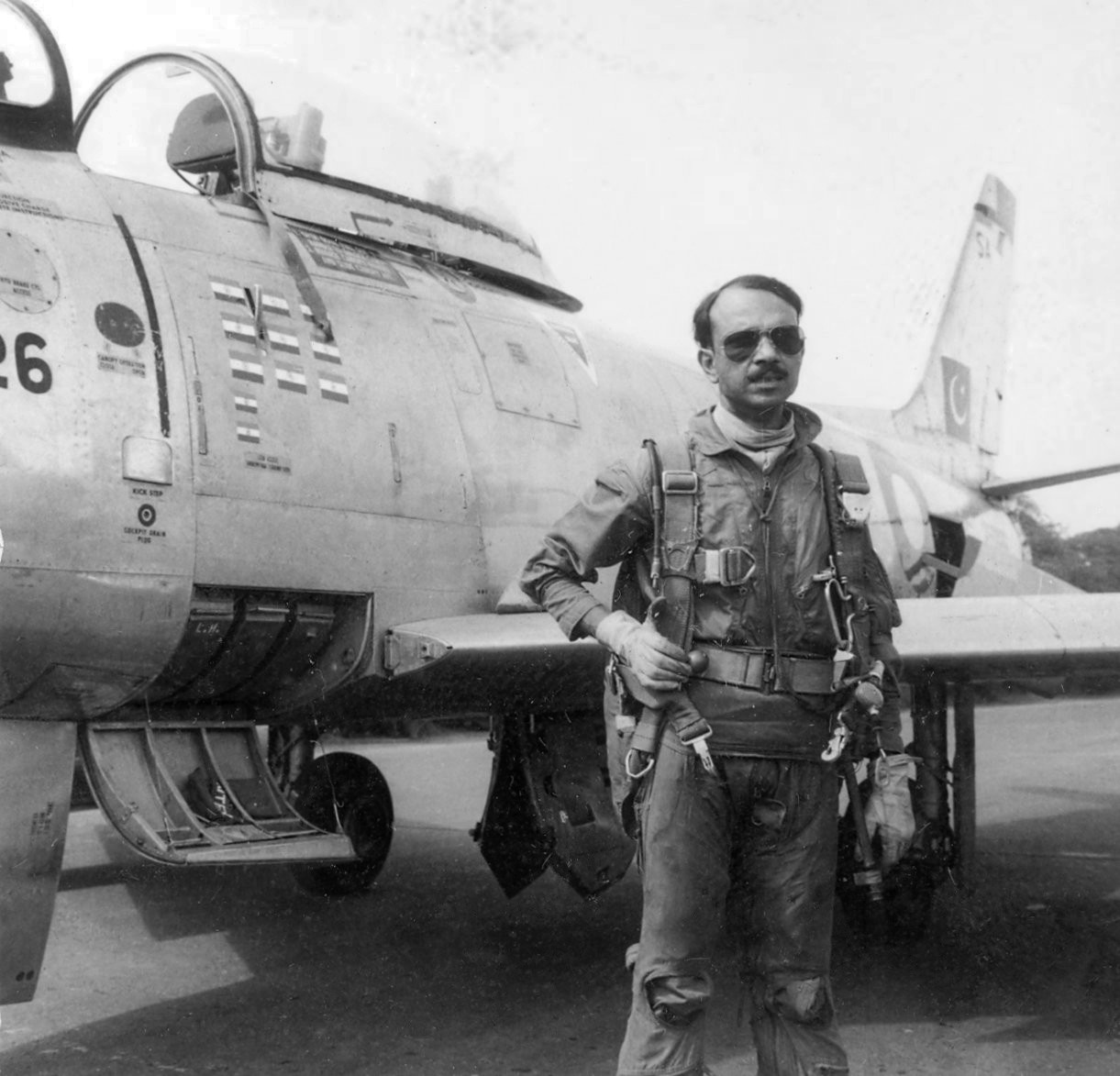
M.M Alam poses with his F-86 Sabre. ace-in-a-day on 7 September 1965.

During the Indo-Pakistani War of 1965, Muhammad Mahmood Alam of Pakistan Air Force downed five aircraft in a single sortie on 7 September 1965 all in less than a minute to establish an aerial record. Alam is also the only ace-in-a-day achieved by a jet pilot.

== Russo-Ukrainian War ==
- The Ghost of Kyiv, was the nickname given to a mythical MiG-29 Fulcrum flying ace who was alleged to have shot down six Russian planes over Kyiv during the Kyiv offensive on 24 February 2022, effectively becoming an Ace in a day. The origin of the myth is unclear, but it was propagated widely by both Ukrainian and Western media outlets, as well as official sources such as the Armed Forces of Ukraine and the Security Service of Ukraine. The Ghost of Kyiv has been credited as a morale booster for Ukrainians during the Russo-Ukrainian War. Two months after the story spread, the Ukrainian Air Force acknowledged that it was not factual, and warned people not to "neglect the basic rules of information hygiene" and to "check the sources of information, before spreading it".
- On 13 October 2022, the Ukrainian government claims that Ukrainian pilot Vadym Voroshylov shot down 5 Shahed 136 drones before being forced to eject from his MiG-29 aircraft after it was hit by debris from the last Shahed-136 that had shot down. Voroshylov had shot down two Russian cruise missiles the day prior, though this has yet to be officially verified by independent sources.

== Hamas War ==
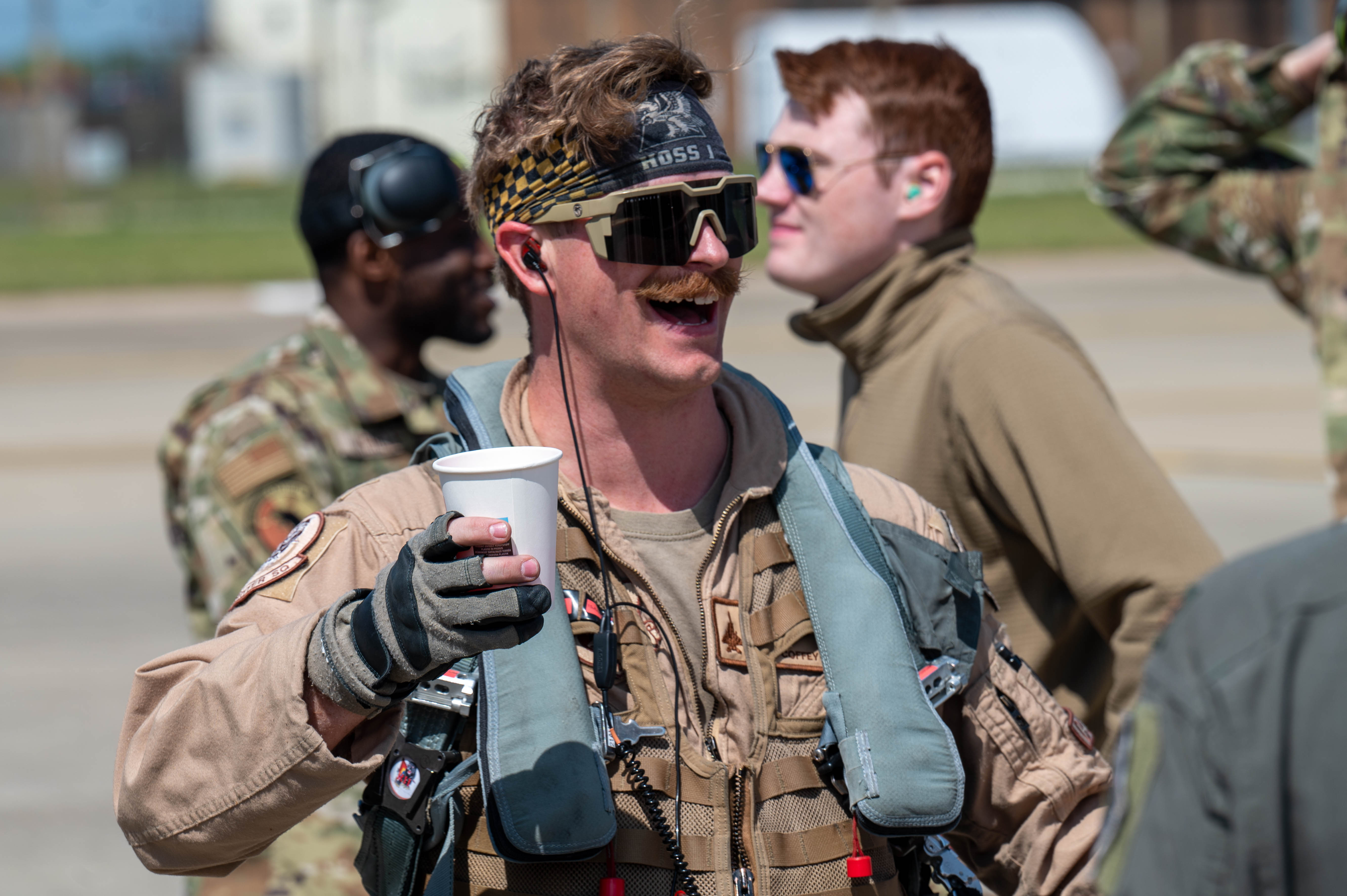
Maj. Benjamin Coffey returns from his deployment where he shot down six Iranian drones in a single engagement.

- USAF Capt. Lacie Hester, a weapons systems officer, and pilot Major Benjamin Coffey were awarded silver stars for shooting down at least 6 Iranian drones in their F-15E during the April 2024 Iranian strikes against Israel.
- Captains Claire Eddins and Carla Nava also shot down 5 drones in the same engagement

== See also ==
- Aerial victory standards of World War I
- Confirmation and overclaiming of aerial victories during World War II
- Lists of World War I flying aces
- List of World War II flying aces
