= Bruce W. Carr =

US Air Force colonel

Bruce Ward Carr
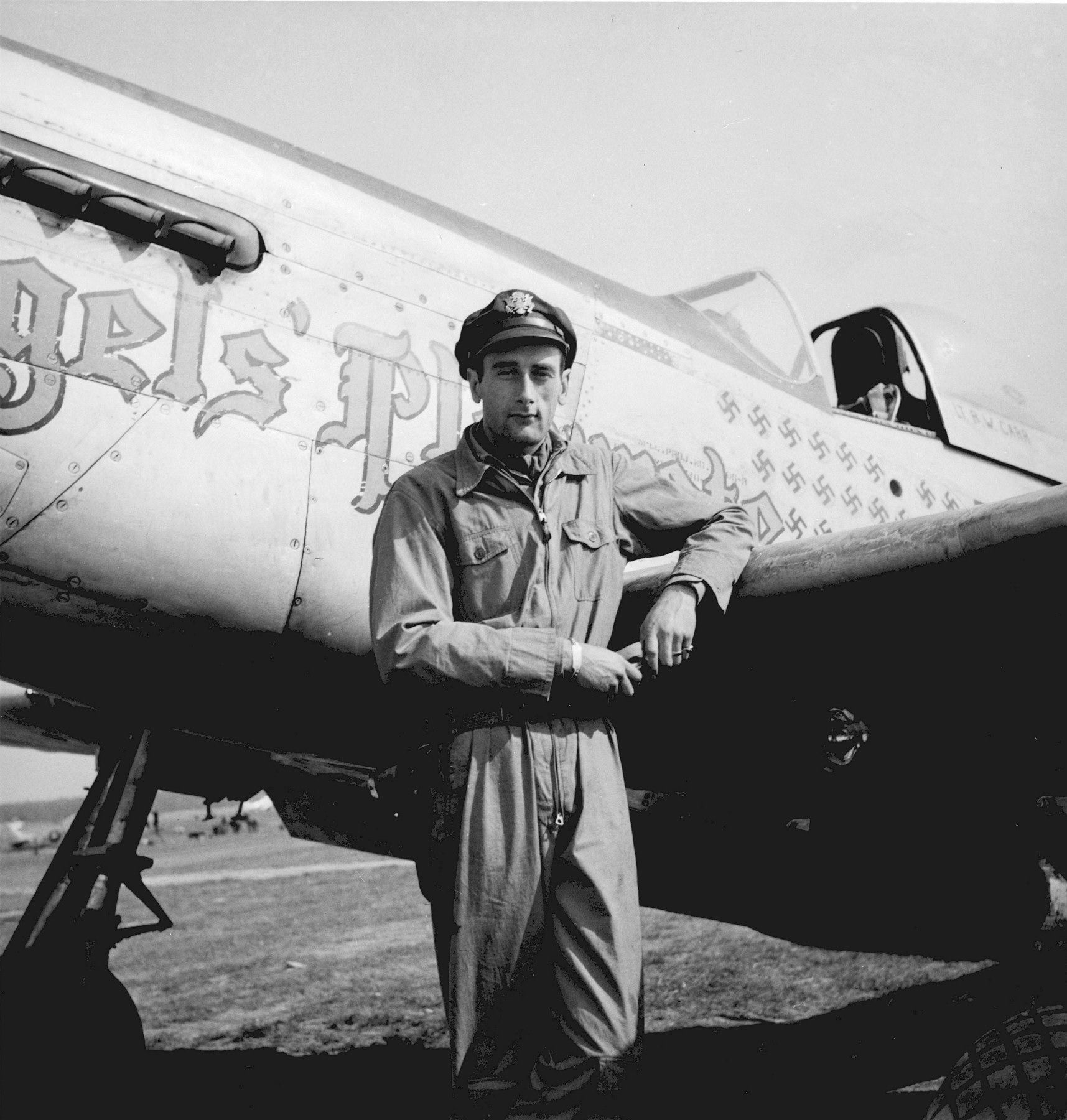
- Born: January 28, 1924; Union Springs, New York, US
- Died: April 25, 1998 (aged 74); St. Cloud, Florida, US
- Burial place: Arlington National Cemetery
- Military career
- Allegiance: United States of America
- Branch: United States Army Air Forces; United States Air Force
- Service years: 1942–1973
- Rank: Colonel
- Units: 363rd Fighter Group; 354th Fighter Group; 4th Fighter-Interceptor Group; 31st Tactical Fighter Wing
- Commands: 336th Fighter-Interceptor Squadron
- Conflicts: World War II; Korean War; Vietnam War
- Awards: Distinguished Service Cross; Silver Star; Legion of Merit; Distinguished Flying Cross (4); Air Medal (31)

Bruce Ward Carr (January 28, 1924 – April 25, 1998) was a highly decorated United States Air Force colonel. One myth attributed to him is that during World War II, he was shot down over Germany and, after evading capture for several days, sneaked into a Luftwaffe airfield and stole an enemy plane which he flew back to Allied lines. He also became a flying ace credited with 14 or 15 aerial victories, including five in a single day, for which he was awarded the Distinguished Service Cross.

== Early life and World War II ==
Bruce W. Carr was born on January 28, 1924, in Union Springs, New York. He began flying at the age of 15 in 1939, and enlisted into the United States Army Air Forces on September 3, 1942. Carr entered the Aviation Cadet Training Program, where his military flight instructor happened to be the very same person who taught him to fly in 1939.

Due to his previous flying experience, Carr was placed in an accelerated training program, flying the P-40 Warhawk at Spence Field, Georgia. Acquiring over 240 flight hours, Carr was promoted to flight officer on August 30, 1943.

Carr deployed to Europe in February 1944, where he was assigned to the 380th Fighter Squadron, 363rd Fighter Group, Ninth Air Force, at RAF Rivenhall in Essex, England. The 363rd was one of the first units to adopt the P-51 Mustang. Carr had never flown above 10,000 feet (3,000 m), but when he took the P-51 to an altitude of 30,000 feet (9,100 m), he was duly impressed and named his plane "Angels’ Playmate."

=== Ace status ===
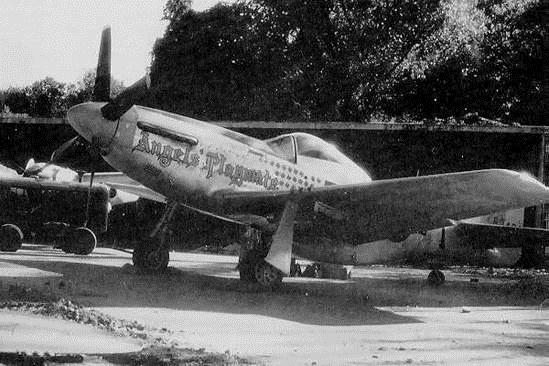
P-51D Angels’ Playmate

On March 8, 1944, Flight Officer Carr scored his squadron's first kill, however, he was not given credit for it. Carr chased a German Messerschmitt Bf 109 to within a few feet off the ground, firing his guns the whole time. Only one bullet hit the enemy plane, and the pilot bailed out far too close to the ground and crashed. Carr said he scared the German pilot to death and caused him to kill himself.

Upon returning to the airfield, Carr was criticized by his leaders for being "overaggressive." In May, he was transferred to the 353rd Fighter Squadron, 354th Fighter Group, at RAF Lashenden in Kent. Claiming a probable kill over Normandy, France, on June 14, Carr scored his first official credit on June 17, when he assisted another pilot in downing an Focke-Wulf Fw 190. The next day, the squadron transferred to an airfield in France. On August 18, Carr was commissioned as a second lieutenant.

On September 12, Carr's flight strafed several Junkers Ju 88 bombers on an airfield in Germany. Later in that same mission, the flight spotted over 30 Fw 190s approximately 2,000 feet (610 m) below them. Carr personally shot three from the sky before escorting a fellow pilot, whose aircraft was badly damaged, back to base. Carr was awarded the Silver Star for his actions that day.

=== Focke Wulf incident ===
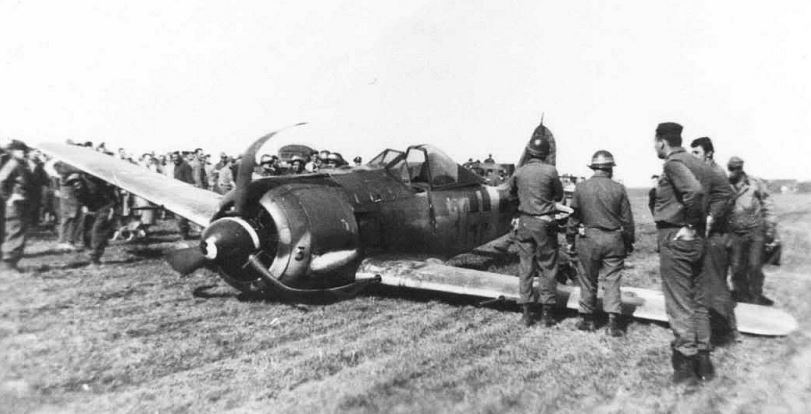
This is a garbled retelling of a planned flight in a captured aircraft, that occurred on May 8th from Linz, Austria, where Carr and others pilots from his unit knew there were abandoned aircraft that could be "liberated". Fw 190 flown by Carr, after belly landing at an airfield in France (May 8, 1945)

According to the myth, "On November 2, 1944, Carr took off on a mission and was shot down by flak while strafing ground targets over Czechoslovakia. He bailed out and landed near a Luftwaffe field with the intent of surrendering to the Luftwaffe troops, but it was becoming dark just as he got there. From the trees he watched as two mechanics fueled up an FW 190, and hatched a daring plan to escape by stealing that plane.

Near dawn he snuck out and jumped in the cockpit. Through experimentation, Carr was able to start the plane, and with Luftwaffe personnel already coming out to see what was going on he gunned it across a corner of the field on a path that had him pass between two hangars before he was airborne."

Here, the garbled tale returns to reflecting actual historical events. "Managing to make it back to his home field in France, Carr was unable to lower the landing gear and was forced to make a belly up landing." Whereupon, the myth immediate derailed again, with the following untruth: "Upon landing, he was presumed to be a hostile German pilot by the armed personnel at the airfield, until he was recognised by his group commander George R. Bickel." The official 354th FG Unit History does not include the incident, there is no matching MACR (loss report for his supposedly lost Mustang), no "Evasion Report", etc. Shortly before his death in 1998, at the AFAA Annual Reunion in San Antonio, this incident was brought up in front of Colonel Carr and many others from his unit and he admitted/accepted that it was a "bar story that got out of hand."

=== Further war service ===
On April 2, 1945, First Lieutenant Carr was leading three other aircraft on a reconnaissance mission near Schweinfurt, Germany, when he spotted 60 German fighters flying above them. Despite the enemy having an altitude advantage and outnumbering them, Carr led his flight in an attack and the pilots downed a total of 15 aircraft. Carr personally shot down two Fw 190s, three Bf 109s and damaged a sixth fighter. This feat made Carr the last ace in a day in the European Theater during the war and he was awarded the Distinguished Service Cross for his actions.

Carr was promoted to captain on April 9, and claimed several more aerial victories that month, claiming two final victories on April 25. Carr flew a total of 172 combat missions during the war, accumulating 14 or 15 confirmed air-to-air victories. He had several more unconfirmed victories and multiple ground kills.

== Later career and life ==
After the war, Carr was assigned to the Acrojets as an F-80 Shooting Star pilot at Williams Air Force Base, Arizona. The Acrojets, which preceded the Thunderbirds, were the United States Air Force's first jet-powered aerobatic demonstration team.

Major Carr later flew the F-86 Sabre in 57 combat missions with the 336th Fighter-Interceptor Squadron while stationed at Kimpo (K-14) Air Base in South Korea during the Korean War. He then served as the commanding officer of the 336th at Misawa Air Base in Japan, from January 1955 to August 1956.

On November 3, 1968, Carr was promoted to colonel and deployed to South Vietnam later that month. He was assigned to the 31st Tactical Fighter Wing at Tuy Hoa Air Base. He flew the F-100 Super Sabre in 286 combat missions during the war, which mostly consisted of flying close air support bombing and strafing missions. Carr was awarded the Legion of Merit and three Distinguished Flying Crosses during his deployment, before he rotated back to the United States in November 1969.

Carr retired from the Air Force in 1973. He died of prostate cancer on April 25, 1998, in St. Cloud, Florida, and was buried in Arlington National Cemetery.

== Awards and decorations ==
Carr's awards include the following:

Command Pilot
Distinguished Service Cross
Silver Star	Legion of Merit	Distinguished Flying Cross w/ 'V' device and three bronze oak leaf clusters
Air Medal w/ four silver oak leaf clusters	Air Medal w/ one silver and three bronze oak leaf clusters (second ribbon required for accoutrement spacing)	Air Medal (third ribbon required for accoutrement spacing)
Air Force Presidential Unit Citation w/ bronze oak leaf cluster	American Campaign Medal	European-African-Middle Eastern Campaign Medal w/ four bronze campaign stars
World War II Victory Medal	National Defense Service Medal w/ bronze service star	Korean Service Medal w/ three bronze campaign stars
Vietnam Service Medal w/ 2 bronze campaign stars	Air Force Longevity Service Award w/ silver and bronze oak leaf clusters	Vietnam Air Service Medal; Honor Class
United Nations Service Medal for Korea	Vietnam Campaign Medal	Korean War Service Medal

=== Distinguished Service Cross ===
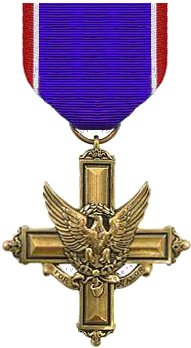

Bruce W. Carr
1st Lieutenant (Air Corps), U.S Army Air Forces
353d Fighter Squadron, 9th Air Force
Date of Action: April 2, 1945
Headquarters, U.S. Strategic Forces in Europe, General Orders No. 55 (May 27, 1945)

Citation:

The President of the United States of America, authorized by Act of Congress July 9, 1918, takes pleasure in presenting the Distinguished Service Cross to First Lieutenant (Air Corps) Bruce Ward Carr, United States Army Air Forces, for extraordinary heroism in connection with military operations against an armed enemy while serving as Pilot of a P-51 Fighter Airplane in the 353d Fighter Squadron, 354th Fighter Group, Ninth Air Force, in aerial combat against enemy forces on 2 April 1945, in the European Theater of Operations. On this date, while leading four aircraft on an armed reconnaissance mission near Schweinfurt, Germany, Lieutenant Carr observed more than sixty enemy fighters flying high above. Completely disregarding his personal safety and the enemy's overwhelming numerical superiority and tactical advantage of altitude, he led his element in a direct attack on the hostile force, personally destroying five enemy aircraft and damaging still another. The extraordinary heroism and determination of this officer to destroy the enemy are in keeping with the highest traditions of the Armed Forces of the United States.
