= Murray J. Shubin =

Murray Joseph Shubin
- Born: 2 April 1917; Pittsburgh, Pennsylvania, US
- Died: July 23, 1956 (aged 39); Lyon, France
- Burial place: Fort Logan National Cemetery, Denver, Colorado
- Military career
- Allegiance: United States
- Branch: United States Army Air Corps; United States Army Air Forces; United States Air Force
- Service years: 1941–1956
- Rank: Lieutenant Colonel
- Conflicts: World War II: Solomon Islands campaign
- Awards: Distinguished Service Cross; Silver Star; Distinguished Flying Cross (2); Air Medal (4)

Murray Joseph Shubin (2 April 1917 – 23 July 1956) was a highly decorated United States Air Force lieutenant colonel. During World War II, he became a flying ace credited with shooting down 11 or 12 enemy planes, including at least five in a single day, for which he was awarded the Distinguished Service Cross.

== Early life and career ==
Murray J. Shubin was born on 2 April 1917 in Pittsburgh, Pennsylvania. Raised in the nearby suburb of Dormont, Shubin graduated from Dormont High School. In 1940, he graduated from Kenyon College, and then enlisted into the United States Army Air Corps under the Aviation Cadet Training Program in the spring of 1941. Shubin soon transferred over to the newly formed United States Army Air Forces.

== World War II ==
Several months after being commissioned to second lieutenant, Shubin deployed to Guadalcanal, flying P-38 Lightnings with the 339th Fighter Squadron, 347th Fighter Group, Thirteenth Air Force. At Guadalcanal, Shubin took part in bombing and strafing missions, along with B-17 escort missions targeting Japanese ships at Bougainville. On 2 February 1943, Shubin shot down his first Japanese plane. His next victory would not come until 7 June.

=== Ace in a day ===
On 16 June 1943, Shubin's fighter group intercepted a large force of Japanese aircraft flying towards the Russell Islands. He was leading three other P-38s at 27,000 feet when he spotted 50 enemy planes 4,000 feet below them off Guadalcanal. Diving on a group of approximately 15 A6M Zeros at the rear of the formation, he and two other pilots all quickly shot one down. One Zero then pulled up in a climb directly in front of Shubin, and he destroyed it as well.

One of the other P-38s was damaged and returned to the airfield. A second P-38 pilot shot down two more Zeros before his guns jammed. He returned home as well, with the third P-38 escorting him, leaving Shubin in the fight by himself with five remaining enemy planes.

Shubin struck the first plane in the cockpit, causing it to fall from the sky. He then managed to fire a well-placed deflection shot on the second Zero, hitting it in the engine and causing it to dive as well. After several diving attempts on the last three Zeros, Shubin riddled the third plane along the entire length of the fuselage, causing it to crash.

The two final Zeros were circling above Savo Island and Shubin attacked them from the rear. He missed the fourth Zero and it was able to fly away. The fifth Zero attacked Shubin head-on and they both missed each other. He managed to turn around and hit the fifth plane, causing it to crash.

Shubin only listed two confirmed kills for himself that day with the other four he shot down listed as probables as he was unable to observe whether any of them actually crashed. However, an officer with the 35th Infantry Regiment had watched the dogfight through his binoculars at Guadalcanal, and confirmed three of the Zeros originally listed as probables. Additionally, his sixth probably may have been confirmed by ground troops as well. These confirmations meant Shubin had shot down five or six enemy planes in a period of 45 minutes, making him an ace in a day. For his actions that day, he was awarded the Distinguished Service Cross.

=== Later war service ===
Shubin in October 1943.

Shubin later shot down two more enemy planes on 10 October 1943, and another two on 27 October, finishing the war as a double ace with 11 or 12 confirmed victories. He returned home in January 1944, along with his Australian wife, Oriole Coombes, whom he had named his P-38 Lightning after. Shubin had met her in 1942 after he was released in a hospital in Brisbane, Australia. In addition to his Distinguished Service Cross, Shubin was also awarded the Silver Star, two Distinguished Flying Crosses, and four Air Medals. He never returned to combat and instead trained new P-38 pilots at the end of the war.

== Later career and death ==
Shubin stayed in the military after the war, transferring to the Air Force in 1947. He served at The Pentagon and at Okinawa, before he was assigned as the commanding officer of the 71st Bombardment Squadron based at Laon-Couvron Air Base in Aisne, France. On 23 July 1956, Lieutenant Colonel Murray J. Shubin died of a heart attack while on maneuvers near Lyon, France.
