= List of aerial victories claimed by Herbert Ihlefeld =

Herbert Ihlefeld (1 June 1914 – 8 August 1995) was a German Luftwaffe military aviator during the Spanish Civil War and World War II, a fighter ace listed with 130 enemy aircraft shot down in over 1,000 combat missions. Depending on source, he claimed seven to nine aerial victories in the Spanish Civil War, and during World War II, 67 on the Eastern Front and 56 on the Western Front, including 15 four-engined bombers and 26 Supermarine Spitfires. He survived being shot down eight times during his 1,000 combat missions.

== List of aerial victories claimed ==
According to US historian David T. Zabecki, Ihlefeld was credited with 123 World War II aerial victories. Spick lists him with 130 aerial victories, including seven claims in Spain, claimed in over 1,000 combat missions and a mission-to-claim ratio of 7.69. Mathews and Foreman, authors of Luftwaffe Aces — Biographies and Victory Claims, researched the German Federal Archives and found documentation for 122 aerial victory claims, plus five further unconfirmed claims. This number includes nine claims during the Spanish Civil War, 48 on the Western Front, including three four-engined bombers, and 65 on the Eastern Front.

Victory claims were logged to a map-reference (PQ = Planquadrat), for example "PQ 05 Ost S/ET-1". The Luftwaffe grid map (Jägermeldenetz) covered all of Europe, western Russia and North Africa and was composed of rectangles measuring 15 minutes of latitude by 30 minutes of longitude, an area of about 360 square miles (930 km^{2}). These sectors were then subdivided into 36 smaller units to give a location area 3 km × 4 km (1.9 mi × 2.5 mi) in size.

♠ (Ace of spades) indicates those aerial victories which made Ihlefeld an "ace-in-a-day", a term which designates a fighter pilot who has shot down five or more airplanes in a single day.
– (dash) indicates unconfirmed aerial victory claims for which Ihlefeld did not receive credit.
! (exclamation mark) indicates those aerial victories listed by Forsyth, Prien, Stemmer, Rodeike and Bock.
# (hash mark) indicates those aerial victories listed by Mathews and Foreman.
? (question mark) indicates information discrepancies listed by Prien, Stemmer, Rodeike, Bock, Mathews and Foreman.

Claim!	Claim#	Date	Time	Type	Location	Claim!	Claim#	Date	Time	Type	Location
– 2. Staffel of Jagdgruppe 88 – Spanish Civil War
1	1	21 February 1938	—	I-16		—	6	25 June 1938	—	I-16	
2	2	13 March 1938	—	I-15		5	7	12 July 1938	—	I-15	
3	3	11 May 1938	—	I-16		6	8	15 July 1938	—	I-15	
—	4	18 May 1938	—	I-16		7	9	15 July 1938	—	I-15	
4	5	2 June 1938	—	SB-2							
– Stab I.(Jagd) Gruppe of Lehrgeschwader 2 – Battle of France — 10 May – 25 June 1940
8	10	29 May 1940	20:12? (Note: According to Mathews and Foreman claimed at 20:22.)	MS.406	Chauny vicinity of Saint-Quentin						
– Stab I.(Jagd) Gruppe of Lehrgeschwader 2 – At the Channel and over England — 26 June 1940 – 30 March 1941
9	11	30 June 1940	15:25	Blenheim	east of Aire vicinity of Abbeville	11	13	9 July 1940	17:04? (Note: According to Mathews and Foreman claimed at 13:04.)	Spitfire	Thames Estuary
10	12	30 June 1940	15:30	Spitfire	west of Abbeville						
– 2.(Jagd) Staffel of Lehrgeschwader 2 – At the Channel and over England — 26 June 1940 – 30 March 1941
12	14	13 August 1940	17:10	Blenheim? (Note: According to Mathews and Foreman claimed as a Hawker Hurricane.)	Barham	21	24	5 September 1940	11:10	Spitfire	London near Biggin Hill
13	15	22 August 1940	15:30? (Note: According to Mathews and Foreman claimed at 13:50.)	Spitfire	Dover	22	25	5 September 1940	— ? (Note: According to Mathews and Foreman claimed at 11:10.)	Spitfire	London vicinity of Hythe
	16	22 August 1940	13:55	Blenheim		23	27	6 September 1940	10:10? (Note: According to Mathews and Foreman claimed at 18:20.)	Spitfire	London
14	17	22 August 1940	15:35? (Note: According to Mathews and Foreman claimed at 14:05.)	Spitfire	Dover	24	26	6 September 1940	17:55	Spitfire	Ashford
15	18	24 August 1940	12:40	Spitfire	Dover vicinity of London	25	28	7 September 1940	18:20? (Note: According to Mathews and Foreman claimed at 17:55.)	Spitfire	Rochester
16	19	24 August 1940	16:55	Spitfire	London	26	29	7 September 1940	18:30? (Note: According to Mathews and Foreman claimed at 18:20.)	Spitfire	Maidstone
17	20	30 August 1940	19:25	Spitfire	Biggin Hill		30	11 September 1940	16:50	Spitfire	vicinity of London
18	21	31 August 1940	14:00	Spitfire	Kenley		31	11 September 1940	17:15	Spitfire	vicinity of London
19	22	2 September 1940	14:25	Spitfire	Dungeness	27	32	15 September 1940	15:30? (Note: According to Mathews and Foreman claimed at 16:20.)	Spitfire	London
20	23	2 September 1940	18:20	Spitfire	Sheerness						
– Stab I.(Jagd) Gruppe of Lehrgeschwader 2 – At the Channel and over England — 26 June 1940 – 30 March 1941
28	33	24 September 1940	10:25	Spitfire	London	35	39	26 February 1941	14:15	Spitfire	2 km (1.2 mi) west of Calais-Marck
29	34	27 September 1940	10:10	Spitfire	London	36	40	1 March 1941	17:15	Spitfire	10 km (6.2 mi) west of Calais
30	—	27 September 1940	10:50	Spitfire	London	37	41	13 March 1941	13:55	Spitfire	in the middle of the English Channel
31	35	17 January 1941	16:00	Spitfire	northeast of Boulogne-sur-Mer	38	42	19 March 1941	19:08	Spitfire	10 km (6.2 mi) east of Hastings
32	36	10 February 1941	13:24	Spitfire	east of Dover	39	43	19 March 1941	19:10	Spitfire	10 km (6.2 mi) east of Hastings
33	37	14 February 1941	13:40	Spitfire	west of Dover	40	44	26 March 1941	12:30	Spitfire	Dungeness
34	38	14 February 1941	13:48	Spitfire	west of Dover						
– Stab I.(Jagd) Gruppe of Lehrgeschwader 2 – Crete — 1 April – 1 June 1941
41	45	16 May 1941	16:50	Hurricane	Maleme						
– Stab I.(Jagd) Gruppe of Lehrgeschwader 2 – Operation Barbarossa — 22 June – 5 December 1941
42	46	22 June 1941	04:30	I-16		48	52	4 July 1941	17:48	I-15	
43	47	23 June 1941	05:50	SB-2		49	53	6 July 1941	18:50	I-16	
44	48	26 June 1941	09:10	I-16		50	54	9 July 1941	09:35	I-153	
45	49	26 June 1941	09:20	SB-2		51	55	10 July 1941	13:17	I-15	
46	50	27 June 1941	09:20	I-16		52	56	12 July 1941	11:20? (Note: According to Mathews and Foreman claimed at 11:12.)	MiG-3	
47	51	2 July 1941	16:07	I-16		53	57	15 October 1941	17:42	MiG-3	
– Stab I.(Jagd) Gruppe of Lehrgeschwader 2 – Eastern Front — 6 December 1941 – 28 April 1942
54	58	8 December 1941	14:02	I-16		59	63	22 December 1941	13:25	I-15	
55	59	9 December 1941	13:00	I-16		60	64	27 December 1941	14:00	I-16	
56	60	11 December 1941	10:12	I-16		—	—	28 December 1941	—	MiG-3	
57	61	11 December 1941	10:15	SB-3		61	65	5 January 1942	15:00	I-26	
58	62	22 December 1941	10:05	MiG-3							
– Stab I. Gruppe of Jagdgeschwader 77 – Eastern Front — 6 December 1941 – 28 April 1942
62	66	19 January 1942	15:15	I-16		85♠	89	30 March 1942	11:48	R-10 (Seversky)	
63	67	24 January 1942	12:10	I-16		86♠	90	30 March 1942	11:50	I-16	
64	68	24 January 1942	12:12	I-16? (Note: According to Mathews and Foreman claimed as a Tupolev SB-3.)		87♠	91	30 March 1942	11:53	I-61 (MiG-3)? (Note: According to Mathews and Foreman claimed as a Seversky.)	
65	69	25 January 1942	12:35	R-10 (Seversky)		88	92	6 April 1942	15:16	I-61 (MiG-3)	
66	70	4 February 1942	12:30	I-16?		89	93	8 April 1942	15:40	I-16? (Note: According to Mathews and Foreman claimed as a Mikoyan-Gurevich MiG-3.)	
67	71	4 February 1942	15:50	I-16? (Note: According to Mathews and Foreman claimed as a Seversky.)		90	94	19 April 1942	09:00+	I-61 (MiG-3)? (Note: According to Mathews and Foreman claimed as a Lavochkin-Gorbunov-Gudkov LaGG-3.)	
68	72	11 February 1942	14:00	I-16		91	95	19 April 1942	11:45	I-61 (MiG-3)?	
69	73	17 March 1942	09:00	I-26 (Yak-1)		92	96	19 April 1942	11:15? (Note: According to Mathews and Foreman claimed at 11:45.)	I-61 (MiG-3)	
70	74	20 March 1942	13:25? (Note: According to Mathews and Foreman claimed at 16:25 as an Ilyushin DB-3.)	R-5?		93	97	19 April 1942	15:20	I-61 (MiG-3)	
	75	20 March 1942	16:50	I-16		94♠	98	20 April 1942	08:10	I-61 (MiG-3)	
71	76	21 March 1942	12:55	I-26 (Yak-1)		95♠	99	20 April 1942	08:11	I-61 (MiG-3)	
72		21 March 1942	15:00	R-5		96♠	100	20 April 1942	08:12	I-61 (MiG-3)	
73	77	21 March 1942	17:05	I-16		97♠	101	20 April 1942	11:30? (Note: According to Mathews and Foreman claimed at 11:40.)	I-61 (MiG-3)	
74	78	21 March 1942	17:10	I-16		98♠	102	20 April 1942	14:55	I-61 (MiG-3)	
75♠	79	24 March 1942	07:00	I-26 (Yak-1)		99♠	103	20 April 1942	14:56	I-61 (MiG-3)	
76♠	80	24 March 1942	07:10? (Note: According to Mathews and Foreman claimed at 07:02 as a Yakovlev Yak-1.)	I-16?		100♠	104	20 April 1942	14:57	I-61 (MiG-3)	
77♠	81	24 March 1942	13:30? (Note: According to Mathews and Foreman claimed at 13:28 as a Seversky.)	I-301 (LaGG-3)?		101	105	21 April 1942	17:10	I-61 (MiG-3)	
78♠	82	24 March 1942	13:35? (Note: According to Mathews and Foreman claimed at 13:40 as a Seversky.)	I-301 (LaGG-3)?		102	106	21 April 1942	17:13	I-61 (MiG-3)	
79♠	83	24 March 1942	13:37? (Note: According to Mathews and Foreman claimed at 16:30.)	I-301 (LaGG-3)		103	107	22 April 1942	10:30	I-301 (LaGG-3)	
80	84	27 March 1942	17:00? (Note: According to Mathews and Foreman claimed at 13:40 as a Lavochkin-Gorbunov-Gudkov LaGG-3.)	I-61 (MiG-3)?		104	108	22 April 1942	10:31? (Note: According to Mathews and Foreman claimed at 06:51.)	I-301 (LaGG-3)	
81♠	85	30 March 1942	09:45	I-301 (LaGG-3)		105	109	22 April 1942	17:15? (Note: According to Mathews and Foreman claimed at 12:35.)	I-301 (LaGG-3)	
82♠	86	30 March 1942	09:45	I-61 (MiG-3)?		106	110	22 April 1942	17:30	I-301 (LaGG-3)	
83♠	87	30 March 1942	11:40	I-61 (MiG-3)		107		25 April 1942	16:25	I-15	
84♠	88	30 March 1942	11:42	R-10 (Seversky)							
– Stab of Jagdgeschwader 52 – Eastern Front — 6 December 1941 – 28 April 1942
108	—	1 July 1942	16:00+	MiG-1		110	—	9 July 1942	09:00+	I-16	
109	—	4 July 1942	15:00+	Hurricane		111		July 1942	—	unknown	
– Stab of Jagdgruppe 25 – Defense of the Reich — November 1943
112	111	13 November 1943	11:45? (Note: According to Mathews and Foreman claimed at 11:58.)	P-38	PQ 05 Ost S/TS-1 south of Quakenbrück						
– Stab of Jagdgeschwader 1 – Invasion of Normandy — June – August 1944
113	112	8 May 1944	09:56	B-17	PQ 05 Ost S/ET-1, vicinity of Verden	119	118	14 July 1944	19:19	Spitfire	PQ 15 West UU-1; PQ 95 Ost S/UU-1, south of Caen
114	113	8 May 1944	12:00? (Note: According to Mathews and Foreman claimed at 10:00.)	B-17	PQ 05 Ost S/ET-2, vicinity of Verden northwest of Celle	120	119	18 July 1944	09:55	P-38	PQ 05 Ost S/UG-1/5, northwest of Paris
115	114	12 July 1944	19:03	Spitfire	PQ 15 West TT-9; PQ 95 Ost S/UU-9, vicinity of Caen	121	120	25 July 1944	19:23	Lancaster	PQ 05 Ost S/TC-3, vicinity of Rouen
116	115	12 July 1944	19:05? (Note: According to Mathews and Foreman claimed at 19:04.)	Spitfire	PQ 95 Ost S/UU-8, vicinity of Caen	122	121	25 July 1944	19:30	Spitfire	PQ 05 Ost S/TC-3, vicinity of Rouen
117	116	12 July 1944	19:07? (Note: According to Mathews and Foreman claimed at 19:05.)	Spitfire	PQ 95 Ost S/UU-8, vicinity of Caen	123	122	27 July 1944	07:27	P-51	PQ 95 Ost S/UU, vicinity of Caen
118	117	14 July 1944	19:17	P-51	PQ 15 West UU-1; PQ 95 Ost S/UU-1, south of Caen	124		1 August 1944	—	P-51	PQ 04 Ost N/AA, south of Lisieux
– Stab of Jagdgeschwader 1 – Defense of the Reich — November 1944
125		26 November 1944	—	B-17							
