= List of World War II aces credited with 50–99 victories =

List of world war II victories

Fighter aces in World War II had tremendously varying kill scores, affected as they were by many factors: the pilot's skill level, the performance of the airplane the pilot flew and the planes they flew against, how long they served, their opportunity to meet the enemy in the air (Allied to Axis disproportion), whether they were the formation's leader or a wingman, the standards their air service brought to the awarding of victory credits, et cetera.

== Aces ==
This background, along with the symbol "†", indicates that the pilot was killed in action, missing in action, died of wounds, or was killed in a flying accident during World War II.

Name	Country	Service(s)	Aerial victories	Other aerial victories	Notes	Image
Leopold Steinbatz †	Germany	Luftwaffe	99			
Wolfgang Späte	Germany	Luftwaffe	99		Jet ace with 5 victories in Me 262	
Heinrich Bartels †	Germany	Luftwaffe	99			
Horst Hannig †	Germany	Luftwaffe	98			
Gustav Rödel	Germany	Luftwaffe	98			
Helmut Rüffler	Germany	Luftwaffe	98			
Hans Schleef †	Germany	Luftwaffe	98			
Helmut Mertens	Germany	Luftwaffe	97			
Hermann Schleinhege	Germany	Luftwaffe	97			
Diethelm von Eichel-Streiber	Germany	Luftwaffe	96			
Heinrich Höfemeier †	Germany	Luftwaffe	96			
Siegfried Lemke	Germany	Luftwaffe	96		Credited with more than 5 heavy bombers shot down	
Leopold Münster †	Germany	Luftwaffe	95			
Ilmari Juutilainen	Finland	Finnish Air Force	94		Top non-German ace. Claimed 126 victories. Ace in a day. Victories were against the Soviet Union.	
Rudolf Müller †	Germany	Luftwaffe	94	possibly 101		
Anton Döbele †	Germany	Luftwaffe	94			
Heinrich Klöpper †	Germany	Luftwaffe	94			
Rudolf Resch †	Germany	Luftwaffe	93	+1 in Spanish Civil War		
Edmund Roßmann	Germany	Luftwaffe	93			
Siegfried Schnell †	Germany	Luftwaffe	93		Credited with 10 heavy bombers shot down	
Helmut Bennemann	Germany	Luftwaffe	93			
Gerhard Loos †	Germany	Luftwaffe	92			
Oskar Romm	Germany	Luftwaffe	92			
Anton Resch	Germany	Luftwaffe	91			
Heinz Kemethmüller	Germany	Luftwaffe	89			
Hiroyoshi Nishizawa †	Japan	Imperial Japanese Navy	87		Top Japanese ace	
Georg Schentke †	Germany	Luftwaffe	87	possibly 90		
Josef Jennewein †	Germany	Luftwaffe	86			
Anton Mader	Germany	Luftwaffe	86			
Ulrich Wöhnert	Germany	Luftwaffe	86			
Gerhard Köppen †	Germany	Luftwaffe	85			
Walter Zellot †	Germany	Luftwaffe	85			
Heinz Ewald	Germany	Luftwaffe	84			
Peter Kalden	Germany	Luftwaffe	84			
Werner Quast	Germany	Luftwaffe	84			
Heinrich Prinz zu Sayn-Wittgenstein †	Germany	Luftwaffe	83		Night fighter ace	
Otto Weßling †	Germany	Luftwaffe	83			
Walter Ohlrogge	Germany	Luftwaffe	83			
Franz Beyer †	Germany	Luftwaffe	83			
Hans Grünberg	Germany	Luftwaffe	82		Jet ace with 5 victories in Me 262; Credited with 10 heavy bombers shot down	
Emil Darjes	Germany	Luftwaffe	82			
Hans Götz †	Germany	Luftwaffe	82			
Helmut Mißner †	Germany	Luftwaffe	82			
Max-Hermann Lücke †	Germany	Luftwaffe	81			
Hugo Broch	Germany	Luftwaffe	81			
Willi Nemitz †	Germany	Luftwaffe	81			
Wilhelm Philipp	Germany	Luftwaffe	81			
Rudolf Wagner †	Germany	Luftwaffe	81			
Tetsuzō Iwamoto	Japan	Imperial Japanese Navy	80	+14 in Second Sino-Japanese War	Ace in each of two wars, analysis in 1971 suggests up to 87 WWII confirmed, his diary claimed 202 victories	
Herbert Bachnick †	Germany	Luftwaffe	80			
Otto Würfel †	Germany	Luftwaffe	79			
Georg-Peter Eder	Germany	Luftwaffe	78		Jet ace with 12 victories in Me 262; Credited with 36 heavy bombers shot down	
Wolfgang Ewald	Germany	Luftwaffe	78			
Heinrich Krafft †	Germany	Luftwaffe	78			
Karl-Gottfried Nordmann	Germany	Luftwaffe	78			
Alexander Preinfalk †	Germany	Luftwaffe	78			
Josef Haiböck	Germany	Luftwaffe	77			
Johann-Hermann Meier †	Germany	Luftwaffe	77			
Hans-Joachim Kroschinski	Germany	Luftwaffe	76			
Maximilian Mayerl	Germany	Luftwaffe	76			
Alfred Teumer †	Germany	Luftwaffe	76			
Edwin Thiel †	Germany	Luftwaffe	76			
Hans Wind	Finland	Finnish Air Force	75			
Johannes Bunzek †	Germany	Luftwaffe	75			
Helmut Grollmus †	Germany	Luftwaffe	75			
Johann Pichler	Germany	Luftwaffe	75			
Hans Roehrig †	Germany	Luftwaffe	75			
Joachim Wandel †	Germany	Luftwaffe	75			
Gustav Frielinghaus	Germany	Luftwaffe	74			
Otto Gaiser †	Germany	Luftwaffe	74			
Friedrich Haas †	Germany	Luftwaffe	74			
Hubertus von Bonin †	Germany	Luftwaffe	73	+4 in Spanish Civil War		
Anton Lindner	Germany	Luftwaffe	73			
Gerhard Michalski	Germany	Luftwaffe	73		Credited with more than 10 heavy bombers shot down	
Otto Schultz	Germany	Luftwaffe	73			
Wilhelm Herget	Germany	Luftwaffe	72			
Shigeo Fukumoto	Japan	Imperial Japanese Navy	72			
Klaus Mietusch †	Germany	Luftwaffe	72		Credited with 13 heavy bombers shot down	
Wilhelm Mink †	Germany	Luftwaffe	72			
Karl-Heinz Schnell	Germany	Luftwaffe	72			
Hans Fuß †	Germany	Luftwaffe	71			
Adolf Glunz	Germany	Luftwaffe	71			
Alfred Heckmann	Germany	Luftwaffe	71			
Günther Scheel †	Germany	Luftwaffe	71		highest kill-to-mission ratio	
Shoichi Sugita	Japan	Imperial Japanese Navy	70		+40 shared	
Karl Hoffmann	Germany	Luftwaffe	70			
Hermann-Friedrich Joppien †	Germany	Luftwaffe	70			
Heinz Lange	Germany	Luftwaffe	70			
Rudi Linz †	Germany	Luftwaffe	70			
Emil Omert †	Germany	Luftwaffe	70			
Armin Köhler	Germany	Luftwaffe	69			
Ernst Weismann †	Germany	Luftwaffe	69			
Eugen-Ludwig Zweigart †	Germany	Luftwaffe	69		Credited with 10 heavy bombers shot down	
Constantin Cantacuzino	Romania	Royal Romanian Air Force	69	+8 unconfirmed	Top Romanian ace	
Kurt Dombacher	Germany	Luftwaffe	68			
Walter Höckner †	Germany	Luftwaffe	68			
Herbert Huppertz †	Germany	Luftwaffe	68			
Heinrich Jung †	Germany	Luftwaffe	68			
Herbert Kaiser	Germany	Luftwaffe	68			
Richard Leppla	Germany	Luftwaffe	68			
Fritz Losigkeit	Germany	Luftwaffe	68			
Günther Freiherr von Maltzahn	Germany	Luftwaffe	68			
Hans Strelow †	Germany	Luftwaffe	68			
Ernst Süß †	Germany	Luftwaffe	68			
Otto Tange †	Germany	Luftwaffe	68			
Karl Hammerl †	Germany	Luftwaffe	68			
Gustav Denk †	Germany	Luftwaffe	67			
Fritz Dinger †	Germany	Luftwaffe	67			
Herbert Findeisen	Germany	Luftwaffe	67		Includes 42 claims as an aerial reconnaissance pilot.	
Reinhold Hoffmann †	Germany	Luftwaffe	67			
Erbo Graf von Kageneck †	Germany	Luftwaffe	67			
Franz Schieß †	Germany	Luftwaffe	67			
Franz Schwaiger †	Germany	Luftwaffe	67			
Hubert Strassl †	Germany	Luftwaffe	67		Triple-ace in a day	
Erwin Fleig	Germany	Luftwaffe	66			
Ivan Kozhedub	Soviet Union	Soviet Air Force	66		Top Allied ace in WWII	
Werner Streib	Germany	Luftwaffe	66		Night fighter ace	
Hans Döbrich	Germany	Luftwaffe	65			
Heinrich Füllgrabe †	Germany	Luftwaffe	65			
Berthold Graßmuck †	Germany	Luftwaffe	65			
Karl Kempf †	Germany	Luftwaffe	65			
Manfred Meurer †	Germany	Luftwaffe	65		Night fighter ace	
Günther Radusch	Germany	Luftwaffe	65		Night fighter ace	
Grigory Rechkalov	Soviet Union	Soviet Air Force	65		including 4 shared victories	
Waldemar Semelka †	Germany	Luftwaffe	65			
Karl Fuchs †	Germany	Luftwaffe	64			
Bernd Gallowitsch	Germany	Luftwaffe	64			
Jürgen Harder †	Germany	Luftwaffe	64			
Rolf Hermichen	Germany	Luftwaffe	64		Credited with 26 heavy bombers shot down	
Walter Lindner	Germany	Luftwaffe	64			
Viktor Petermann	Germany	Luftwaffe	64			
Heinz Rökker	Germany	Luftwaffe	64		Night fighter ace	
Rudolf Schoenert	Germany	Luftwaffe	64		Night fighter ace	
Franz Götz	Germany	Luftwaffe	63			
Heinrich Hoffmann †	Germany	Luftwaffe	63			
Gerhard Homuth †	Germany	Luftwaffe	63			
Wilhelm Schilling	Germany	Luftwaffe	63			
Hermann Staiger	Germany	Luftwaffe	63		Credited with 26 heavy bombers shot down	
Kurt Welter	Germany	Luftwaffe	63		Jet ace with 20+ claimed in Me 262; 56 as night fighter; possibly all time jet ace	
Karl-Heinz "Heino" Cordes	Germany	Luftwaffe	62			
Wilhelm Hübner †	Germany	Luftwaffe	62			
Helmut Neumann	Germany	Luftwaffe	62			
Horst Haase	Germany	Luftwaffe	62	possibly 82		
Karl-Heinz Meltzer †	Germany	Luftwaffe	61			
Gerhard Beutin	Germany	Luftwaffe	60			
Hans-Ekkehard Bob	Germany	Luftwaffe	60			
Horst Carganico †	Germany	Luftwaffe	60			
Franz Czech	Germany	Luftwaffe	60			
Nikolai Gulayev	Soviet Union	Soviet Air Force	60		including 5 shared victories	
Franz Hrdlicka †	Germany	Luftwaffe	60	possibly 96		
Kurt Kelter	Germany	Luftwaffe	60			
August Mors †	Germany	Luftwaffe	60			
Karl Munz	Germany	Luftwaffe	60			
Alfred Rauch	Germany	Luftwaffe	60			
Hans-Arnold Stahlschmidt †	Germany	Luftwaffe	59			
Franz Eckerle †	Germany	Luftwaffe	59	possibly 62		
Alfred Franke †	Germany	Luftwaffe	59			
Helmut Haberda †	Germany	Luftwaffe	59			
Georg Michalek	Germany	Luftwaffe	59			
Karl Steffen	Germany	Luftwaffe	59			
Paul Zorner	Germany	Luftwaffe	59		Night fighter ace	
Siegfried Engfer	Germany	Luftwaffe	59			
Hermann Buchner	Germany	Luftwaffe	58		Jet ace with 12 victories in Me 262; Credited with 10 heavy bombers shot down	
Martin Becker	Germany	Luftwaffe	58		Night fighter ace	
Herbert Broennle †	Germany	Luftwaffe	58			
Herbert Friebel	Germany	Luftwaffe	58			
Wilhelm Freuwörth	Germany	Luftwaffe	58			
Gerhard Raht	Germany	Luftwaffe	58		Night fighter ace	
Hiromichi Shinohara †	Japan	Imperial Japanese Army	58			
Gabriel Tautscher	Germany	Luftwaffe	58			
Lutz-Wilhelm Burckhardt	Germany	Luftwaffe	57+			
Heinrich-Wilhelm Ahnert †	Germany	Luftwaffe	57			
Konrad Bauer	Germany	Luftwaffe	57		Credited with 32 heavy bombers shot down	
Kurt Ebener	Germany	Luftwaffe	57			
Johannes Seifert †	Germany	Luftwaffe	57			
Edmund Wagner †	Germany	Luftwaffe	57			
Hermann Wolf	Germany	Luftwaffe	57			
Gustav Francsi	Germany	Luftwaffe	56		Night fighter ace	
Heinz Hackler †	Germany	Luftwaffe	56			
Erich Hohagen	Germany	Luftwaffe	56		Credited with more than 8 heavy bombers shot down	
Helmuth Holtz	Germany	Luftwaffe	56			
Eduard Isken	Germany	Luftwaffe	56			
Kurt Knappe †	Germany	Luftwaffe	56			
Josef Kraft	Germany	Luftwaffe	56		Night fighter ace	
Eino Luukkanen	Finland	Finnish Air Force	56			
Helmut Schönfelder	Germany	Luftwaffe	56			
Günther Seeger	Germany	Luftwaffe	56			
Heinz Strüning †	Germany	Luftwaffe	56		Night fighter ace	
Helmut Wick †	Germany	Luftwaffe	56			
Kirill Yevstigneyev	Soviet Union	Soviet Air Force	56		including 3 shared victories	
Herbert Bareuther †	Germany	Luftwaffe	55			
Karl-Heinz Bendert	Germany	Luftwaffe	55			
Hans Ehlers †	Germany	Luftwaffe	55		Credited with 24 heavy bombers shot down	
Hans-Dieter Frank	Germany	Luftwaffe	55		Night fighter ace	
Wilhelm-Ferdinand Galland †	Germany	Luftwaffe	55		Credited with 8 heavy bombers shot down	
Herbert Puschmann †	Germany	Luftwaffe	54			
Takeo Okumura †	Japan	Imperial Japanese Navy	54			
Johann Badum †	Germany	Luftwaffe	54			
Heinz Leber †	Germany	Luftwaffe	54			
Siegfried Simsch †	Germany	Luftwaffe	54			
Heinz Vinke †	Germany	Luftwaffe	54		Night fighter ace	
Hannes Trautloft	Germany	Luftwaffe	53	+5 in Spanish Civil War		
August Geiger †	Germany	Luftwaffe	53		Night fighter ace	
Albert Brunner †	Germany	Luftwaffe	53			
Hans-Joachim Heyer †	Germany	Luftwaffe	53			
Willy Kientsch †	Germany	Luftwaffe	53			
Carl Sattig	Germany	Luftwaffe	53			
Julius Meimberg	Germany	Luftwaffe	53			
Herbert Lütje	Germany	Luftwaffe	53		Night fighter ace	
Franz Barten †	Germany	Luftwaffe	52			
Heinz-Edgar Berres †	Germany	Luftwaffe	52			
Martin Drewes	Germany	Luftwaffe	52		Night fighter ace	
Alfred Gross	Germany	Luftwaffe	52			
Ludwig Häfner †	Germany	Luftwaffe	52			
Rudolf Pflanz †	Germany	Luftwaffe	52			
Friedrich Rupp †	Germany	Luftwaffe	52			
Werner Hoffmann	Germany	Luftwaffe	52		Night fighter ace	
Rudi Zwesken	Germany	Luftwaffe	52			
Hermann Greiner	Germany	Luftwaffe	51		Night fighter ace	
Egmont Prinz zur Lippe-Weißenfeld †	Germany	Luftwaffe	51		Night fighter ace	
Fritz Lüddecke †	Germany	Luftwaffe	51			
Otto Schulz †	Germany	Luftwaffe	51			
Heinrich Wefers	Germany	Luftwaffe	51			
Wilhelm Hauswirth	Germany	Luftwaffe	50			
Dmitry Glinka	Soviet Union	Soviet Air Force	50			
Hans-Joachim Jabs	Germany	Luftwaffe	50		Night fighter ace	
Karl Willius †	Germany	Luftwaffe	50			
