= Ernst Süß =

German World War II fighter pilot

- Born: 31 August 1912; Possessern, Kingdom of Prussia (now Poland)
- Died: 20 December 1943 (aged 31); Oldenburg, Nazi Germany
- Cause of death: Killed in action
- Military career
- Allegiance: Nazi Germany
- Branch: Luftwaffe
- Service years: 1939–1943
- Rank: Oberleutnant (first lieutenant)
- Units: JG 52, JG 50, JG 11
- Commands: 9./JG 11
- Conflicts: See battles World War II: Western Front; Battle of France; Battle of Britain; Eastern Front; Operation Barbarossa; Battle of the Caucasus; Battle of Stalingrad; Defense of the Reich †
- Awards: Knight's Cross of the Iron Cross

Ernst Süß (31 August 1912 – 20 December 1943) was a Luftwaffe fighter ace and recipient of the Knight's Cross of the Iron Cross during World War II. Flying with Jagdgeschwader 52 on the Eastern Front, he claimed 64 aerial victories. In October 1943, Süß was appointed Staffelkapitän (squadron leader) of 9. Staffel (9th squadron) of Jagdgeschwader 11, a unit fighting on Western Front in defense of the Reich missions. Süß claimed one further aerial victory with this unit before he was killed in action on 20 December 1943.

== Early life and career ==
Süß was born on 31 August 1912 in Possessern, at the time in East Prussia, province of the Kingdom of Prussia within the German Empire, present-day Pozezdrze in northern Poland. On 1 March 1940, III. Gruppe (3rd group) of Jagdgeschwader 52 (JG 52—52nd Fighter Wing) was newly formed at Strausberg near Berlin. Initially, this Gruppe was staffed by personnel from other units, among them Süß who was transferred from 3. Staffel (3rd squadron) of JG 52, a squadron of I. Gruppe. The Gruppe was equipped with the Messerschmitt Bf 109 E-1 and E-3. On 6 April, the Gruppe was moved to Mannheim-Sandhofen Airfield where it was placed under the control of the Stab (headquarter unit) of Jagdgeschwader 53 (JG 53–53rd Fighter Wing).

== World War II ==
The rise of General Ion Antonescu in Romania in 1940 led to a reorganization of his country's armed forces. In this, he was supported by a military mission from Germany, the Luftwaffenmission Rumänien (Luftwaffe Mission Romania) under the command of Generalleutnant (equivalent to major general) Wilhelm Speidel. III. Gruppe of JG 52 was transferred to Bucharest in mid-October and temporarily renamed I. Gruppe of Jagdgeschwader 28 (JG 28—28th Fighter Wing) until 4 January 1941. Its primary task was to train Romanian Air Force personnel. Here, Süß joined the trio of Hermann Graf, Alfred Grislawski and Heinrich Füllgrabe. Later, Leopold Steinbatz and Edmund Roßmann joined as well.

=== Operation Barbarossa ===
9. Staffel also known as the Karaya-Staffel

Following its brief deployment in the Balkan Campaign, III. Gruppe was back in Bucharest by mid-June. There, the unit was again subordinated to the Luftwaffenmission Rumänien and reequipped with the new, more powerful Bf 109 F-4 model. On 21 June, the Gruppe was ordered to Mizil in preparation of Operation Barbarossa, the German invasion of the Soviet Union. Its primary objective was to provide fighter protection for the oil fields and refineries at Ploiești. Prior to the invasion, Major Gotthard Handrick was replaced by Major Albert Blumensaat as commander of III. Gruppe. Blumensaat was then replaced by Hauptmann Hubertus von Bonin on 1 October. At the time, von Bonin was still in convalescence so that Hauptmann Franz Höring, the commander of 9. Staffel, was also made the acting Gruppenkommandeur (group commander).

The Gruppe had moved to Belaya Tserkov on 1 August during the Battle of Kiev and also used an airfield at Yampil from 6 to 8 August. Here on 8 August, Süß claimed his first aerial victory, a Polikarpov I-16 fighter shot down south of Kiev. On 24 September, III. Gruppe moved to the Poltava Air Base, supporting the 17th Army in the First Battle of Kharkov. Three days later, Köppen claimed a Ilyushin DB-3 bomber shot down, his second aerial victory. The Gruppe moved to an airfield at Taganrog on 2 November where they stayed until 1 January 1942. Here by the end of 1941, Süß increased his number of aerial victories to seven claimed. On 1 January 1942, III. Gruppe moved to Kharkov where they fought in the Barvenkovo–Lozovaya offensive and remained there until 29 April. During this period, Süß claimed fourteen further aerial victories, including three on 19 February, taking his total to 21.

=== War against the Soviet Union ===
On 29 April, III. Gruppe had relocated to Zürichtal, a small village at the Inhul in the former German settlement west of Feodosia in the Crimea during the Crimean campaign. On 1 May, the Gruppe was subordinated to VIII. Fliegerkorps and was supporting the 11th Army in the Battle of the Kerch Peninsula and the Siege of Sevastopol. There the following, Süß claimed his 22nd aerial victory, a Polikarpov I-153 fighter for which he was awarded the Honour Goblet of the Luftwaffe (Ehrenpokal der Luftwaffe) on 4 May 1942. On 12 May, German forces launched Operation Fredericus, also referred to as the Second Battle of Kharkov, with the objective to eliminate the Izium bridgehead over Seversky Donets. That day, III. Gruppe was moved to the Kharkov-Rogan airfield, southeast of Kharkov, and subordinated to the Stab of JG 52. On 13 May, III. Gruppe flew combat missions east and southeast of Kharkov. During the day, the Gruppe claimed 42 aerial victories, including three Mikoyan-Gurevich MiG-1 fighters by Süß. On 19 May, the Gruppe moved to Barvinkove where they stayed until 12 June mostly fighting over the encircled Soviet forces in the Izium salient. Here, Süß was credited with seven aerial victories, a Sukhoi Su-2 on 20 May, a Lavochkin-Gorbunov-Gudkov LaGG-3 on 28 May, a MiG-1 the next day, two further MiG-1s on 2 June, an I-16 on 6 June, and another MiG-1 on 9 June, taking his total to 38.

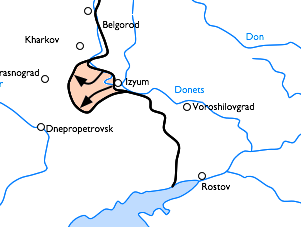
Izium salient (red) in 1942

On 12 June, the Gruppe relocated to an airfield at Belgorod and to Grakowo, located approximately halfway between Kharkov and Kupiansk on 22 June. The main German objectives in that combat area were, breakthrough to the upper Don and capture of Voronezh. In this timeframe, Süß claimed two MiG-1 fighters shot down on 22 June. On 26 June, III. Gruppe then moved to Bely Kolodez where they stayed until 3 July. Here, Süß claimed three MiG-1 fighters shot down on 27 June, taking his total to 43 aerial victories. For these achievements, Süß was awarded the German Cross in Gold (Deutsches Kreuz in Gold) on 2 July. On 28 June, German forces had launched Case Blue, the strategic summer offensive in southern Russia. On 7 July, Army Group A began their advance towards the oil fields in the Caucasus during the Battle of the Caucasus. On 19 July, III. Gruppe relocated to Taganrog where they converted from the Bf 109 F-4 variant to the Bf 109 G-2. Here, Süß claimed two aerial victories, an I-16 on 20 July and a LaGG-3 four days later. On 13 August, III. Gruppe had reached Mineralnye Vody in the North Caucasus region. The Knight's Cross of the Iron Cross (Ritterkreuz des Eisernen Kreuzes) was awarded to him on 4 September 1942 following 50 aerial victories claimed.

On 22 July 1942, the Geschwaderkommodore (wing commander) of JG 52, Major Herbert Ihlefeld, was severely injured in a flight accident and had to surrender command during his convalescence. In consequence, Major Gordon Gollob, the commander of Jagdgeschwader 77 (JG 77—77th Fighter Wing), temporarily took over command of JG 52 as acting Geschwaderkommodore. On 17 August, Gollob was ordered dispatch one Schwarm, a flight of four aircraft, of every III. Gruppe squadron to the Don-bend dubbed Kommando Stalingrad. The pilots selected for this mission included Süß, Graf, Füllgrabe and Hermann Wolf. On 21 August, the Kommando moved to an airfield named Tusow, alternative spelling is Tusoff, located southwest of Kalach-na-Donu and north of Nizhny Chir.

In the spring of 1943, Süß was transferred to the Ergänzungsgruppe Ost, where he remained a long time as an instructor. Following his tour as an instructor, Süß claimed his 64th and last aerial victory on the Eastern Front on 30 May 1943. Flying from an airfield at Taman on the Kerch Strait, he was credited with the destruction of a North American B-25 Mitchell bomber.

=== Defense of the Reich and death ===
In response to political humiliation caused by de Havilland Mosquito bombing raids into Germany, Reichsmarschall Hermann Göring, the commander-in-chief of the Luftwaffe, ordered the formation of two specialized high-altitude Luftwaffe units. These units were Jagdgeschwader 25, commanded by Major Herbert Ihlefeld, and Jagdgeschwader 50, commanded by his friend Graf. Graf was permitted to choose his personnel and had his friends Süß, Füllgrabe and Grislawski transferred from III. Gruppe of JG 52.

On 9 October 1943, Süß was transferred and appointed Staffelkapitän (squadron leader) of 9. Staffel of Jagdgeschwader 11 fighting in defense of the Reich missions. He replaced Oberleutnant Franz Strobl was killed the day before. At the time, III. Gruppe of JG 11, to which his Staffel was subordinated, was based at Oldenburg and commanded by Major Anton Mader. On 11 December, the United States Army Air Forces (USAAF) attacked the harbor and Nordseewerke at Emden where U-boats were built. III. Gruppe was scrambled at 11:00 and were vectored to a point of intercept near the islands of Norderney and Langeoog. While elements of the Gruppe engaged the bombers, Süß claimed one of the escorting Republic P-47 Thunderbolt fighters shot down.

On 20 December, the USAAF bombed Bremen. In total 546 bombers, escorted by 491 escort fighters, targeted the port of Bremen. Defending against this attack, Süß shot down a Lockheed P-38 Lightning fighter but was himself shot down by USAAF fighters near Wardenburg, south of Oldenburg, in his Bf 109 G-5 (Werknummer 15 709—factory number). Süß managed to bail out but may have been shot in his parachute by a USAAF pilot. In an alternative account given by Flieger Viktor Widmaier, Süß's parachute failed to open and his comrades found him in a field west of Bremen. (Note: According to the authors Prien, Stemmer, Rodeike and Bock, the records held by the Deutsche Dienststelle (WASt) do not provide evidence to the claim that Süß was killed USAAF fighters.) Posthumously, Süß was promoted to Oberleutnant (first lieutenant) on 1 August 1944. Command of 9. Staffel was then passed to Oberleutnant Fritz Kälber.

== Summary of career ==
=== Aerial victory claims ===
According to US historian David T. Zabecki, Süß was credited with 68 aerial victories. Spick also lists Süß with 68 aerial victories claimed in an unknown number combat missions, 60 of which claimed on the Eastern Front. Mathews and Foreman, authors of Luftwaffe Aces – Biographies and Victory Claims, researched the German Federal Archives and found records for 65 aerial victory claims, plus one further unconfirmed claim, all but one on the Eastern Front.

Victory claims were logged to a map-reference (PQ = Planquadrat), for example "PQ 0683". The Luftwaffe grid map (Jägermeldenetz) covered all of Europe, western Russia and North Africa and was composed of rectangles measuring 15 minutes of latitude by 30 minutes of longitude, an area of about 360 square miles (930 km^{2}). These sectors were then subdivided into 36 smaller units to give a location area 3 km × 4 km (1.9 mi × 2.5 mi) in size.

Chronicle of aerial victories
This and the – (dash) indicates unconfirmed aerial victory claims for which Süß did not receive credit.
Claim	Date	Time	Type	Location	Claim	Date	Time	Type	Location
– 9. Staffel of Jagdgeschwader 52 – Operation Barbarossa — 22 June – 5 December 1941
1	8 August 1941	18:45	I-16	5 km (3.1 mi) south of Kyiv	4	30 October 1941	09:40	I-16	
2	27 September 1941	14:20	DB-3		5	8 November 1941	11:56	I-26 (Yak-1)	
3	23 October 1941	13:40	Pe-2		6	9 November 1941	14:32	I-16	
– 9. Staffel of Jagdgeschwader 52 – Eastern Front — 6 December 1941 – 28 April 1942
7	6 December 1941	10:58	I-16		15	28 February 1942	11:20	V-11 (Il-2)	
8	7 January 1942	08:15	I-16		16	1 March 1942	11:43	I-26 (Yak-1)	
9	16 February 1942	11:12	Su-2 (Seversky)	Mal-Yablonovo	17	26 March 1942	16:55	I-16	
10	19 February 1942	08:27	I-61 (MiG-3)		18	27 March 1942	10:12	I-61 (MiG-3)	
11	19 February 1942	08:29	I-61 (MiG-3)		19	28 March 1942	06:20	I-26 (Yak-1)	
12	19 February 1942	11:40	Su-2 (Seversky)		20	6 April 1942	06:06	I-16	
13	20 February 1942	08:27	I-61 (MiG-3)		21	8 April 1942	11:20	I-61 (MiG-3)	
14	23 February 1942	12:03	I-26 (Yak-1)						
– 9. Staffel of Jagdgeschwader 52 – Eastern Front — 29 April 1942 – 3 February 1943
22	30 April 1942	16:49	I-153		43	27 June 1942	07:45	MiG-1	
23	8 May 1942	13:23	I-16		44	20 July 1942	11:40	I-16	
24	8 May 1942	13:28	I-61 (MiG-3)		45	24 July 1942	05:05	LaGG-3	
25	9 May 1942	12:25	MiG-1		46	6 August 1942	07:00	Il-2	PQ 0683
26	9 May 1942	12:35	I-15		47	12 August 1942	16:56	I-16	PQ 85721 vicinity of Svobodny
27	13 May 1942	07:43	MiG-1		48	15 August 1942	16:40	Yak-1	PQ 85335 east of Stawropoliskaja
28	13 May 1942	16:18	MiG-1		49	16 August 1942	16:51	I-16	PQ 85321 vicinity of Eriwanskaja
29	13 May 1942	16:20	MiG-1		50	18 August 1942	07:05	I-153	PQ 75852 east of Natukhayevskaya
30	14 May 1942	07:23	MiG-1		51	24 August 1942	17:20	Yak-1	PQ 59173
31	17 May 1942	03:50	MiG-1		52	25 August 1942	11:45	Yak-1	PQ 49272; 10 km (6.2 mi) east of Stalingrad
—	20 May 1942	—	Su-2 (Seversky)		53	31 August 1942	17:06	Yak-1	PQ 59252
32	20 May 1942	17:33	Su-2 (Seversky)		54	31 August 1942	17:12	Yak-1	PQ 59261
33	28 May 1942	14:18	LaGG-3		55	3 September 1942	15:55	Yak-1	PQ 59121
34	29 May 1942	09:13	MiG-1		56	4 September 1942	12:40	Yak-1	PQ 49317 vicinity of Stalingrad
35	2 June 1942	08:29	MiG-1		57	8 September 1942	15:15	Yak-1	PQ 49322 vicinity of Stalingrad
36	2 June 1942	11:28	MiG-1		58	1 November 1942	15:10	LaGG-3	PQ 44873
37	6 June 1942	04:15	I-16		59	1 November 1942	15:18	LaGG-3	PQ 44562
38	9 June 1942	13:15	MiG-1		60	5 November 1942	13:37	La-5	PQ 44953
39	22 June 1942	06:40	MiG-1		61	27 November 1942	10:15	I-16	PQ 44814
40	22 June 1942	06:45	MiG-1		62	5 December 1942	11:04	La-5	PQ 44732
41	27 June 1942	07:20	MiG-1		63	5 December 1942	13:23	Boston	PQ 44724
42	27 June 1942	07:40	MiG-1						
– 9. Staffel of Jagdgeschwader 52 – Eastern Front — May 1943
64	30 May 1943	15:48	B-25	PQ 34 Ost 76892 vicinity of Kiyevskoye					
– 9. Staffel of Jagdgeschwader 11 – Defense of the Reich — December 1943
65	11 December 1943	12:30	P-47	PQ 05 Ost S/BP-4 off Norddeich					

=== Awards ===
- Iron Cross (1939) 2nd and 1st Class
- Honor Goblet of the Luftwaffe on 4 May 1942 as Oberfeldwebel and pilot
- German Cross in Gold on 2 July 1942 as Oberfeldwebel in the 9./Jagdgeschwader 52
- Knight's Cross of the Iron Cross on 4 September 1942 as Oberfeldwebel and pilot in as pilot in the 9./Jagdgeschwader 52 (Note: According to Scherzer as pilot in the III./Jagdgeschwader 52.)
