= Hermann Wolf =

German Luftwaffe pilot (1919–1996)

- Born: 27 December 1919; Frankfurt am Main, Germany
- Died: 21 October 1996 (aged 76); Frankfurt am Main
- Military career
- Allegiance: Nazi Germany
- Branch: Luftwaffe
- Rank: Leutnant (second lieutenant)
- Units: JG 52, JG 11, JG 7
- Commands: 8./JG 11
- Conflicts: World War II: Eastern Front; Defense of the Reich
- Awards: Knight's Cross of the Iron Cross

Hermann Wolf (27 December 1919 – 21 October 1996) was a flying ace in the Luftwaffe and recipient of the Knight's Cross of the Iron Cross during World War II. The Knight's Cross of the Iron Cross, and its variants were the highest awards in the military and paramilitary forces of Nazi Germany during World War II. During his career, he was credited with 57 aerial victories claimed in 586 combat missions. In the second half of 1944, Wolf commanded a Staffel (squadron) of Jagdgeschwader 11 on the Western Front. Shortly before the end of World War II, he briefly flew the Messerschmitt Me 262 jet fighter. Wolf died on 21 October 1996 in Frankfurt am Main.

== Early life and career ==
Wolf was born on 27 December 1919 in Frankfurt am Main, at the time in the Province of Hesse-Nassau within the Weimar Republic. Following flight training as a fighter pilot, (Note: Flight training in the Luftwaffe progressed through the levels A1, A2 and B1, B2, referred to as A/B flight training. A training included theoretical and practical training in aerobatics, navigation, long-distance flights and dead-stick landings. The B courses included high-altitude flights, instrument flights, night landings and training to handle the aircraft in difficult situations.) he was first assigned to Ergänzungs-Jagdgruppe Ost, a supplementary fighter pilot training unit. In early May 1942, Wolf was posted to the 9. Staffel (9th squadron) of Jagdgeschwader 52 (JG 52—52nd Fighter Wing), a squadron of III. Gruppe (3rd group) of JG 52, in the summer of 1941.

== World War II ==
On Friday 1 September 1939 German forces had invaded Poland which marked the beginning of World War II, and in June 1941, Germany had invaded the Soviet Union which created the Eastern Front. On 29 April 1942, III. Gruppe of JG 52 had relocated to Zürichtal, a small village at the Inhul in the former German settlement west of Feodosia in the Crimea during the Crimean campaign. On 1 May, the Gruppe was subordinated to VIII. Fliegerkorps and was supporting the 11th Army in the Battle of the Kerch Peninsula and the Siege of Sevastopol. On 12 May, III. Gruppe relocated to an airfield named Kharkov-Rogan, 10 kilometers (6.2 miles) east of Kharkov where they participated in the Second Battle of Kharkov. Here on 14 May, Wolf's Messerschmitt Bf 109 F-4 (Werknummer 7244—factory number) sustained heavy combat damage. Nevertheless, he survived the crash landing unhurt.

=== Towards Stalingrad ===
On 28 June, German forces had launched Case Blue, the strategic summer offensive in southern Russia. On 7 July, Army Group A began their advance towards the oil fields in the Caucasus during the Battle of the Caucasus. On 19 July, III. Gruppe relocated to Taganrog where they converted from the Bf 109 F-4 variant to the Bf 109 G-2. On 8 August, III. Gruppe reached Belaya Glina. That day, Wolf claimed his second aerial victory, a Mikoyan-Gurevich MiG-3 fighter which was logged as an I-61. On 13 August, III. Gruppe had reached Mineralnye Vody in the North Caucasus region.

9. Staffel also known as the Karaya-Staffel

In mid-August 1942, a specialized unit dubbed Kommando Stalingrad, a detachment of experienced pilots from all three Staffeln of III. Gruppe, was formed to support the assault on Stalingrad to which Wolf was assigned. Among Wolf, this Kommando also included the pilots Hauptmann Hermann Graf, Feldwebel Friedrich Wachowiak, Oberfeldwebel Heinrich Füllgrabe, Oberfeldwebel Ernst Süß. On 21 August, the Kommando moved to an airfield named Tusow, alternative spelling is Tusoff, located southwest of Kalach-na-Donu and north of Nizhny Chir. Two days later, a Schwarm (flight of four aircraft) led by Graf claimed five Lavochkin-Gorbunov-Gudkov LaGG-3 fighters shot down while covering the German spearhead, including one by Wolf. On 11 September, Kommando Stalingrad moved to Pitomnik Airfield. On 26 September, Wolf claimed his last aerial victory over Stalingrad, a LaGG-3 which was his 29th aerial victory in total. For this, Wolf received the Honor Goblet of the Luftwaffe (Ehrenpokal der Luftwaffe) on 23 November 1942.

On 23 July, Wolf received the German Cross in Gold (Deutsches Kreuz in Gold). On 14 December, III. Gruppe began relocating to an airfield at Velyka Lepetykha on the lower Dnieper. At the end of 1943, Wolf had been credited with 50 aerial victories, making him the seventh most successful active fighter pilot of III. Gruppe at the time.

=== Training assignment and Western Front ===
On 27 February 1944, Wolf transferred to Ergänzungs-Jagdgruppe Ost, specialized training unit for new fighter pilots destined for the Eastern Front, as an instructor. On 8 July 1944, Wolf was transferred and appointed Staffelkapitän (squadron leader) of 4. Staffel of Jagdgeschwader 11 (JG 11—11th Fighter Wing). He succeeded Leutnant Herbert Klotz who had been severely wounded in combat on 1 July. On 15 August, the Staffel was redesignated and became the 8. Staffel, a squadron of II. Gruppe of JG 11. At the time, the Gruppe was commanded by Hauptmann Walter Krupinski, also a former member of JG 52. The Gruppe was based at Wunstorf Airfield and was being replenished with factory new Bf 109 G-14 aircraft and inexperienced pilots arriving from the Luftwaffe flight schools.

On 12 August, III. Gruppe began its transfer to the Western Front. The Gruppe was ordered to fly from Wunstorf to Wiesbaden-Erbenheim Airfield. On this transfer flight, Krupinski's engine exploded in midair. He manged to bail out injured. In consequence, command of III. Gruppe was given Hauptmann Karl Leonhard. The next day, the Gruppe moved to Ballancourt-sur-Essonne, France. Here on 14 August, Wolf claimed his first aerial victory on the Western Front. Returning from an orientation flight, the Gruppe came under attack by Supermarine Spitfire fighters. In this encounter, Wolf claimed a Spitfire shot down but was himself also shot down.

On 22 March 1945, Wolf was transferred to III. Gruppe of Ergänzungs-Jagdgeschwader 2 (EJG 2—2nd Supplementary Fighter Wing) for conversion training to the then new Messerschmitt Me 262 jet aircraft. In consequence, command of 8. Staffel of JG 11 was given to Leutnant Richard Franz. On 21 April, Wolf was posted to III. Gruppe of Jagdgeschwader 7 "Nowotny" (JG 7—7th Fighter Wing), the first operational jet fighter wing. The following day, he arrived in Brandenburg-Briest where III. Gruppe of JG 7 was based. Here, Wolf was awarded the Knight's Cross of the Iron Cross (Ritterkreuz des Eisernen Kreuzes).

== Later life ==
Following World War II, Wolf was in contact with many former fighter pilots of the Luftwaffe. He helped publish the Jägerblatt, a publication of the Gemeinschaft der Jagdflieger, the Association of Fighter Pilots. Wolf died on 21 October 1996 at the age of 76 in his hometown Frankfurt am Main, Germany.

== Summary of career ==
=== Aerial victory claims ===
According to US historian David T. Zabecki, Wolf was credited with 57 aerial victories. Obermaier also lists him with 57 aerial victories claimed in 586 combat missions. Mathews and Foreman, authors of Luftwaffe Aces – Biographies and Victory Claims, researched the German Federal Archives and found records for 55 aerial victories, plus further two unconfirmed claims. This figure includes 52 aerial victories on the Eastern Front and three over the Western Allies.

Victory claims were logged to a map-reference (PQ = Planquadrat), for example "PQ 49271". The Luftwaffe grid map (Jägermeldenetz) covered all of Europe, western Russia and North Africa and was composed of rectangles measuring 15 minutes of latitude by 30 minutes of longitude, an area of about 360 square miles (930 km^{2}). These sectors were then subdivided into 36 smaller units to give a location area 3 km × 4 km (1.9 mi × 2.5 mi) in size.

Chronicle of aerial victories
This and the ? (question mark) indicates information discrepancies listed by Barbas, Prien, Stemmer, Rodeike, Balke, Bock, Mathews and Foreman.
Claim	Date	Time	Type	Location	Claim	Date	Time	Type	Location
– Claims with 9. Staffel of Jagdgeschwader 52 – On the Eastern Front — May 1942 – 3 February 1943
1	22 May 1942	16:26	MiG-1		16	8 September 1942	11:30	Il-2	PQ 49271; 1 km (0.62 mi) east of Stalingrad
2	5 August 1942	13:43	MiG-3	PQ 0687	17	8 September 1942	11:36	Yak-1	PQ 49271; 5 km (3.1 mi) east of Stalingrad
3	6 August 1942	12:10	LaGG-3	PQ 05164	18	9 September 1942	13:29	La-5	PQ 49334 south of Stalingrad
4	15 August 1942	11:08	Yak-1	PQ 85274 south of Azovskaya	19	10 September 1942	15:36	La-5	PQ 49203; 25 km (16 mi) east of Stalingrad
5	15 August 1942	11:15	Yak-1	PQ 85173 south of Usun	20	12 September 1942	17:12	P-40	PQ 4921 vicinity of Grebenka
6	17 August 1942	11:08	I-153	PQ 85362 vicinity of Chornyi	21	13 September 1942	08:04	LaGG-3	PQ 40772 vicinity of Spartak
7	17 August 1942	16:58	DB-3	PQ 95553; 30 km (19 mi) north-northeast of Tuapse	22	14 September 1942	04:58	Il-2	PQ 47572 vicinity of Stalingrad
8	23 August 1942	07:26	LaGG-3	PQ 49244; 10 km (6.2 mi) northeast of Stalingrad	23	15 September 1942	08:59	Yak-1	PQ 49442; 20 km (12 mi) southeast of Stalingrad
9	24 August 1942	09:59	LaGG-3	PQ 49233; 35–40 km (22–25 mi) east-northeast of Stalingrad	24	18 September 1942	12:00	LaGG-3	PQ 49122; 15 km (9.3 mi) northwest of Gumrak
10	25 August 1942	11:46	Yak-1	PQ 49273; 15 km (9.3 mi) east of Stalingrad	25	21 September 1942	11:44	Yak-1	PQ 49122; 30 km (19 mi) north of Grebenka
11	27 August 1942	04:45	LaGG-3	PQ 59174	26	23 September 1942	11:00	Yak-1	PQ 49124; 15 km (9.3 mi) northwest of Gumrak
12	2 September 1942	09:13	Yak-1	PQ 49413; 20 km (12 mi) southeast of Stalingrad	27	23 September 1942	14:36	Yak-1	PQ 49713 vicinity of Spartak
13	2 September 1942	17:13	Yak-1	PQ 49423; 25 km (16 mi) east of Stalingrad	28	26 September 1942	08:58	I-153	PQ 49424; 40 km (25 mi) east of Stalingrad
14	3 September 1942	13:56	Yak-1	PQ 40124; 45 km (28 mi) northeast of Grebenka	29	26 September 1942	16:45	LaGG-3	PQ 49214 northeast of Grebenka
15	3 September 1942	17:08	Yak-1	PQ 40851; 35–45 km (22–28 mi) northeast of Grebenka					
– Claims with 9. Staffel of Jagdgeschwader 52 – On the Eastern Front — 4 February – 31 December 1943
30	22 March 1943	14:30	LaGG-3	PQ 34 Ost 76661	41	17 July 1943	08:43	Yak-1	PQ 35 Ost 54651
31	29 April 1943	08:10	LaGG-3	PQ 34 Ost 85123	42? (Note: According to Mathews and Foreman, this claim is unconfirmed.)	3 August 1943	—	Yak-1	
32	27 May 1943	08:32	Yak-1	PQ 34 Ost 85111	43?	3 August 1943	—	La-5	
33	29 May 1943	06:05	Il-2 m.H. (Note: The "m.H." refers to an Ilyushin Il-2 with rear gunner (mit Heckschütze).)	PQ 34 Ost 76892	44	4 August 1943	13:47	LaGG-3	PQ 35 Ost 61353; 15 km (9.3 mi) west of Tomarovka
34	5 July 1943	06:20	LaGG-3	PQ 35 Ost 61153; 10 km (6.2 mi) north of Krasnyi Lyman	45	4 August 1943	18:41	LaGG-3	PQ 35 Ost 61353; 15 km (9.3 mi) west of Tomarovka
35	5 July 1943	09:23	LaGG-3	PQ 35 Ost 61132, south of Kotschetowka	46	10 October 1943	08:07	LaGG-3	PQ 34 Ost 58194, east of Zaporizhia
36	6 July 1943	11:06	Il-2 m.H.	PQ 35 Ost 61483; 15 km (9.3 mi) southeast of Belgorod	47	12 October 1943	07:16	LaGG-3	PQ 34 Ost 58271
37	6 July 1943	17:12	LaGG-3	PQ 35 Ost 62673	48	15 October 1943	08:54	LaGG-3	PQ 34 Ost 58151
38	6 July 1943	17:31	Il-2 m.H.	PQ 35 Ost 61452; 15 km (9.3 mi) northeast of Belgorod	49	26 October 1943	08:10	P-39	PQ 34 Ost 57191
39	7 July 1943	07:14	Il-2 m.H.	PQ 35 Ost 61624; 20 km (12 mi) southeast of Belgorod	50	22 November 1943	13:12	LaGG-3	PQ 34 Ost 48594
40	9 July 1943	12:37	La-5	PQ 35 Ost 62843					
– Claims with 9. Staffel of Jagdgeschwader 52 – On the Eastern Front — 1 January – 27 February 1944
51	15 January 1944	08:52	P-39	PQ 34 Ost 19464; 25 km (16 mi) west-northwest of Kirovohrad	53	17 January 1944	11:06	P-39	PQ 34 Ost 19492; 20 km (12 mi) north of Novoukrainka
52	15 January 1944	09:01	P-39	PQ 34 Ost 29371; 15 km (9.3 mi) west of Kirovohrad					
– Claims with 8. Staffel of Jagdgeschwader 11 – In defense of the Normandy Invasion and on the Western Front — 7 July – 31 December 1944
54	14 August 1944	16:50	Spitfire	PQ 04 Ost N/BE-9 south of Corbeil-Essonnes	56	23 December 1944	09:40	B-26	PQ 05 Ost RN-3 southeast of Daun
55	19 September 1944	17:50	P-38	PQ 05 Ost 63779; Deventer					
– Claims with 8. Staffel of Jagdgeschwader 11 – On the Eastern Front — January – May 1945
57	20 February 1945	—	P-39						

=== Awards ===
- Iron Cross (1939) 2nd and 1st Class
- Honor Goblet of the Luftwaffe on 23 November 1942 as Unteroffizier and pilot
- German Cross in Gold on 23 July 1943 as Feldwebel in the 9./Jagdgeschwader 52
- Knight's Cross of the Iron Cross on 24 April 1945 as Oberfeldwebel and pilot in the 9./Jagdgeschwader 11 (Note: According to Von Seemen on 27 April 1945.)
