= Heinrich Füllgrabe =

German World War II fighter pilot

- Born: 26 July 1916; Witzenhausen
- Died: 30 January 1945 (aged 28); Brieg
- Cause of death: Killed in action
- Military career
- Allegiance: Nazi Germany
- Branch: Luftwaffe
- Rank: Oberleutnant (first lieutenant)
- Units: JG 52, JG 50
- Conflicts: See battles World War II: Eastern Front; Operation Barbarossa; Battle of the Caucasus; Defense of the Reich
- Awards: Knight's Cross of the Iron Cross

Heinrich Füllgrabe (26 July 1916 – 30 January 1945) was a Luftwaffe ace and recipient of the Knight's Cross of the Iron Cross during World War II. The Knight's Cross of the Iron Cross, and its variants were the highest awards in the military and paramilitary forces of Nazi Germany during World War II. After joining the Luftwaffe in the late 1930s, after his training as a fighter pilot, Füllgrabe was appointed to serve as the Unteroffizier 9./JG 52 in spring 1941. Füllgrabe became a member of one of the most efficient units of the Luftwaffe, Karaya Quartet, where he flew alongside Hermann Graf (212 kills), Alfred Grislawski (133) and Ernst Süß (68). Füllgrabe was killed on 30 January 1945 by Soviet anti-aircraft fire near Brieg in Silesia. During his career he was credited with 67 aerial victories, all of them on the Eastern Front, including five Il-2 Sturmoviks.

== Early life and career ==
Füllgrabe was born on 26 July 1916 in Witzenhausen in Hesse-Nassau, a province of the Kingdom of Prussia within the German Empire. Füllgrabe joined the military service of the Luftwaffe, initially serving as a mechanic with I. Gruppe (1st group) of Jagdgeschwader 234 (JG 234–234th Fighter Wing), which later became the I. Gruppe of Jagdgeschwader 26 "Schlageter" (JG 26–26th Fighter Wing). He was trained as a fighter pilot at the Jagdfliegerschule, the fighter pilot school at Stolp-Reitz. (Note: Flight training in the Luftwaffe progressed through the levels A1, A2 and B1, B2, referred to as A/B flight training. A training included theoretical and practical training in aerobatics, navigation, long-distance flights and dead-stick landings. The B courses included high-altitude flights, instrument flights, night landings and training to handle the aircraft in difficult situations.) In June 1940, Füllgrabe was posted to 2. Staffel (2nd squadron) of Ergänzungs-Jagdgruppe Merseburg, a supplementary training unit based at Merseburg. In Merseburg, he befriended Hermann Graf and Alfred Grislawski, with whom he would later spend much of his combat career. In early 1941, he was posted to 9. Staffel of Jagdgeschwader 52 (JG 52—52nd Fighter Wing), a squadron of III. Gruppe.

== World War II ==
9. Staffel also known as the Karaya-Staffel

World War II in Europe had begun on Friday 1 September 1939 when German forces invaded Poland. At the time of Füllgrabel's posting to 9. Staffel, the Gruppe was commanded by Major Gotthard Handrick. The rise of General Ion Antonescu in Romania in 1940 led to a reorganization of his country's armed forces. In this, he was supported by a military mission from Germany, the Luftwaffenmission Rumänien (Luftwaffe Mission Romania) under the command of Generalleutnant (equivalent to major general) Wilhelm Speidel. III. Gruppe of JG 52 was transferred to Bucharest in mid-October and temporarily renamed I. Gruppe of Jagdgeschwader 28 (JG 28—28th Fighter Wing) until 4 January 1941. Its primary task was to train Romanian Air Force personnel. Here, the trio of Füllgrabe, Graf and Grislawski were joined by Ernst Süß, and later by Leopold Steinbatz and Edmund Roßmann.

=== War against the Soviet Union ===
Following its brief deployment in the Balkan Campaign, III. Gruppe was back in Bucharest by mid-June. There, the unit was again subordinated to the Luftwaffenmission Rumänien and reequipped with the new, more powerful Bf 109F-4 model. On 21 June, the Gruppe was ordered to Mizil in preparation of Operation Barbarossa, the German invasion of the Soviet Union. Its primary objective was to provide fighter protection for the oil fields and refineries at Ploiești. Prior to the invasion, Handrick was replaced by Major Albert Blumensaat as commander of III. Gruppe. Blumensaat was then replaced by Hauptmann Hubertus von Bonin on 1 October. At the time, von Bonin was still in convalescence so that Hauptmann Franz Höring, the commander of 9. Staffel, was also made the acting Gruppenkommandeur (group commander).

Füllgrabe received the Honor Goblet of the Luftwaffe (Ehrenpokal der Luftwaffe) on 30 March 1942. On 22 July, the Geschwaderkommodore (wing commander) of JG 52, Major Herbert Ihlefeld, was severely injured in a flight accident and had to surrender command during his convalescence. In consequence, Major Gordon Gollob, the commander of Jagdgeschwader 77 (JG 77—77th Fighter Wing), temporarily took over command of JG 52 as acting Geschwaderkommodore. On 17 August, Gollob was ordered dispatch one Schwarm, a flight of four aircraft, of every III. Gruppe squadron to the Don-bend dubbed Kommando Stalingrad. The pilots selected for this mission included Füllgrabe, Graf, Süß and Hermann Wolf. On 21 August, the Kommando moved to an airfield named Tusow, alternative spelling is Tusoff, located southwest of Kalach-na-Donu and north of Nizhny Chir.

=== Defense of the Reich ===
In response to political humiliation caused by de Havilland Mosquito bombing raids into Germany, Reichsmarschall Hermann Göring, the commander-in-chief of the Luftwaffe, ordered the formation of two specialized high-altitude Luftwaffe units. These units were Jagdgeschwader 25, commanded by Major Herbert Ihlefeld, and Jagdgeschwader 50, commanded by his friend Graf. Graf was permitted to choose his personnel and had his friends Füllgrabe, Grislawski and Süß transferred from III. Gruppe of JG 52.

In December 1943, he was posted to Ergänzungs-Jagdgruppe Ost (Supplemantary Fighter Group East) as fighter pilot instructor.

On 10 January 1944, the United States Army Air Forces targeted the Luther-Werke, at the time a factory of the Messerschmitt Bf 110, Messerschmitt Me 210 and Messerschmitt Me 410, in Braunschweig, and the aircraft repair works in Waggum, a district of Braunschweig. The 3rd Bombardment Division sent 169 bombers, escorted by 466 fighter aircraft. Defending against this attack, Füllgrabe shot down one of the Boeing B-17 Flying Fortress bombers.

In late 1944, Füllgrabe and Leutnant Anton Resch were transferred to the Geschwaderstab (headquarters unit) of JG 52. The request was made by Graf who had been appointed Geschwaderkommodore (wing commander) of JG 52 in September 1944. At the time, the Geschwaderstab was based at Krakau, present-day Kraków. Graf appointed him Geschwaderadjutant (adjutant to the wing commander). Füllgrabe was killed in action on 30 January 1945. Flying Messerschmitt Bf 109 G-14 (Werknummer 511012—factory number), he was shot down by Soviet anti-aircraft artillery 18 kilometers (11 miles) northwest of Brieg, present-day Brzeg in southwestern Poland.

== Summary of career ==
=== Aerial victory claims ===
According to US historian David T. Zabecki, Füllgrabe was credited with 67 aerial victories. The author Obermaier also lists him with 67 aerial victories, all of which claimed on the Eastern Front. Spick however lists him with 65 aerial victories claimed in an unknown number combat missions, all of which claimed on the Eastern Front. Mathews and Foreman, authors of Luftwaffe Aces — Biographies and Victory Claims, researched the German Federal Archives and found records for 63 aerial victory claims, all but one heavy bomber on the Eastern Front.

Victory claims were logged to a map-reference (PQ = Planquadrat), for example "PQ 95514". The Luftwaffe grid map (Jägermeldenetz) covered all of Europe, western Russia and North Africa and was composed of rectangles measuring 15 minutes of latitude by 30 minutes of longitude, an area of about 360 square miles (930 km^{2}). These sectors were then subdivided into 36 smaller units to give a location area 3 km × 4 km (1.9 mi × 2.5 mi) in size.

Chronicle of aerial victories
This and the ? (question mark) indicates information discrepancies listed by Prien, Stemmer, Rodeike, Bock, Mathews and Foreman.
Claim	Date	Time	Type	Location	Claim	Date	Time	Type	Location
– 9. Staffel of Jagdgeschwader 52 – Operation Barbarossa — 22 June – 5 December 1941
1	10 August 1941	11:10	I-16		6	2 October 1941	09:58	I-26 (Yak-1)	35 km (22 mi) northeast of Poltava
2	25 August 1941	10:48	I-16		7	14 October 1941	09:58	I-26 (Yak-1)	north of Valki
3	26 August 1941	10:50	Pe-2		8	6 November 1941	07:59	I-61 (MiG-3)	
4	2 September 1941	12:16	V-11 (Il-2)		9	17 November 1941	14:35	I-16	
5	28 September 1941	10:46	one-engined ground-attack aircraft						
– 9. Staffel of Jagdgeschwader 52 – Eastern Front — 6 December 1941 – 28 April 1942
10	6 December 1941	11:02	I-16		21	23 February 1942	12:05	I-26 (Yak-1)	
11	27 December 1941	14:26	I-16	northeast of Golodayevka	22	25 February 1942	10:49	I-26 (Yak-1)	
12	27 December 1941	14:33	I-16		23	25 February 1942	10:51	I-26 (Yak-1)	south-southwest of Andreyevka
13	5 January 1942	14:42	I-16		24	1 March 1942	11:48	I-26 (Yak-1)	
14	25 January 1942	12:15	I-153	4 km (2.5 mi) southwest of Lyskow	25	16 March 1942	11:08	I-61 (MiG-3)	
15	25 January 1942	12:17	I-153	3 km (1.9 mi) southwest of Lyskow	26	16 March 1942	11:48	I-61 (MiG-3)	
16	16 February 1942	11:11	Su-2 (Seversky)	Krassnoje	27	26 March 1942	16:55	I-16	
17	19 February 1942	08:22	I-61 (MiG-3)		28	27 March 1942	10:10	I-61 (MiG-3)	
18	19 February 1942	08:28	I-61 (MiG-3)		29	28 March 1942	17:10	I-61 (MiG-3)	
19	19 February 1942	11:41	Su-2 (Seversky)		30	28 March 1942	17:43	I-16	
20	23 February 1942	11:57	R-5		31	8 April 1942	11:22	I-61 (MiG-3)	
– 9. Staffel of Jagdgeschwader 52 – Eastern Front — 29 April 1942 – 3 February 1943
32	29 May 1942	09:14	MiG-1		47	17 August 1942	16:56	TB-7? (Note: According to Mathews and Foreman claimed as a Ilyushin DB-3.)	PQ 95514 vicinity of Gumrak
33	29 May 1942	09:16	MiG-1		48	22 August 1942	14:00	Yak-1	PQ 49151; 20–30 km (12–19 mi) east of Stalingrad
34	2 June 1942	11:30	Su-2 (Seversky)		49	23 August 1942	07:25	LaGG-3	PQ 49281; 10 km (6.2 mi) northeast of Stalingrad
35	9 June 1942	13:17	LaGG-3		50	23 August 1942	13:33	LaGG-3	PQ 49242
36	22 June 1942	06:41	MiG-1		51	27 August 1942	04:44	LaGG-3	PQ 49464
37	22 June 1942	06:44	MiG-1		52	27 August 1942	04:47	Yak-1	PQ 59174 vicinity of Krasnaya Sloboda
38	30 June 1942	18:28	MiG-1		53	3 September 1942	15:57	Yak-1	PQ 50782; 20–30 km (12–19 mi) east of Stalingrad
39	5 August 1942	09:41	LaGG-3	PQ 0679	54	4 September 1942	14:45? (Note: According to Mathews and Foreman claimed at 12:41.)	Yak-1	PQ 44441; 5 km (3.1 mi) east of Stalingrad
40	5 August 1942	13:40	MiG-1	PQ 0687	55	8 September 1942	11:34	Il-2	PQ 49261; 20 km (12 mi) southeast of Stalingrad
41	6 August 1942	12:07	LaGG-3	PQ 05241	56	8 September 1942	15:17	La-5	PQ 49493; 20 km (12 mi) southeast of Stalingrad
42	15 August 1942	11:07	Yak-1	PQ 85282 vicinity of Smolenskaya	57	9 September 1942	13:27	La-5	PQ 49444; 20 km (12 mi) southeast of Stalingrad
43	15 August 1942	11:10	Yak-1	PQ 85194 east of Derbentskaya	58	14 September 1942	04:57	MiG-3	PQ 47443 south of Stalingrad
44	15 August 1942	11:13	Yak-1	PQ 85113 vicinity of Eriwanskij	59	15 September 1942	08:57	Yak-1	PQ 49422; 5 km (3.1 mi) east of Stalingrad
45	17 August 1942	11:06	I-153	PQ 85362 vicinity of Tschernyj	60	15 September 1942	09:15	Il-2	PQ 49344
46	17 August 1942	11:11	I-153	PQ 85364; 40 km (25 mi) north of Tuaose	61	22 September 1942	11:08	Il-2	PQ 49414
– 9. Staffel of Jagdgeschwader 52 – Eastern Front — March 1943
62	22 March 1943	14:32	LaGG-3	PQ 34 Ost 76654 west of Petrovskaya					
– Stab of Jagdgeschwader 11 – Defense of the Reich — February 1944
63	10 February 1944	12:50	B-17	PQ 05 Ost S/FN, vicinity of Zwolle; Meppel-Staphorst					

=== Awards ===
- Iron Cross (1939) 2nd and 1st Class
- Honor Goblet of the Luftwaffe on 30 March 1942 as Feldwebel and pilot
- German Cross in Gold on 11 May 1942 as Feldwebel in the III./Jagdgeschwader 52 (Note: According to Obermaier on 25 May 1942.)
- Knight's Cross of the Iron Cross on 2 October 1942 as Oberfeldwebel and pilot in the 9./Jagdgeschwader 52 (Note: According to Scherzer as pilot in the III./Jagdgeschwader 52.)
