= Leopold Steinbatz =

German World War II fighter pilot

- Steinbatz as Oberfeldwebel
- Born: 25 October 1918; Vienna, Austria-Hungary
- Died: 23 June 1942 (aged 23); Vovchansk, Reichskommissariat Ukraine
- Cause of death: Killed in action
- Military career
- Allegiance: Nazi Germany
- Branch: Luftwaffe
- Service years: 1937–1942
- Rank: Leutnant (posthumous)
- Nickname: "Bazi" (Note: "Bazi" is an Austrian or Bavarian term for a prankster, rascal or naughty boy.)
- Unit: JG 52
- Conflicts: See battles World War II: Battle of Crete; Eastern Front; Operation Barbarossa; Crimean campaign †; World War II
- Awards: Knight's Cross of the Iron Cross with Oak Leaves and Swords

Leopold Steinbatz (25 October 1918 – 23 June 1942) was an Austrian-born fighter pilot of the Luftwaffe in World War II. As a fighter ace, he was credited with 99 aircraft shot down in over 300 combat missions, all of which claimed over the Eastern Front.

Steinbatz volunteered for military service in the Austrian Armed Forces in 1937. In March 1938, following the Anschluss, the annexation of Austria by Nazi Germany, Steinbatz was transferred to the Luftwaffe. Following flight training, he was posted to Jagdgeschwader 52 (JG 52—52nd Fighter Wing). Steinbatz fought in the aerial battles of Operation Barbarossa, the German invasion of the Soviet Union and claimed his first aerial victory on 4 August 1941. Following his 42nd aerial victory, he was awarded the Knight's Cross of the Iron Cross on 14 February 1942 and the Knight's Cross of the Iron Cross with Oak Leaves on 2 June 1942 after he claimed his 83rd aerial victory. On 23 June 1942, Steinbatz was killed in action, shot down by Soviet anti-aircraft artillery, near Vovchansk. Posthumously, he was awarded the Knight's Cross of the Iron Cross with Oak Leaves and Swords, the only non-commissioned officer to receive this distinction.

== Early life and career ==
Steinbatz was born on 25 October 1918 in Stammersdorf, now Floridsdorf, one of the district of Vienna, in Austria-Hungary. In his youth, he learned to fly gliders and received a vocational education as a butcher. Following his vocational education, he joined the Austrian Air Force and received pilot training with Flieger-Ausbildungsregiment (Flight Training Regiment) in Wiener Neustadt on 1 October 1937. Following the Anschluss in March 1938, the forced incorporation of Austria into Nazi Germany, Steinbatz was transferred to the Luftwaffe and trained as a fighter pilot at the Jagdfliegerschule in Wien-Aspern.

== World War II ==
World War II in Europe had begun on Friday, 1 September 1939, with the German Invasion of Poland. Steinbatz was transferred to 2. Staffel (2nd Squadron) of the Ergänzungsgruppe of Jagdgeschwader 52 (JG 52—52nd Fighter Wing), a supplementary and training fighter group of JG 52. (Note: For an explanation of Luftwaffe unit designations, see Organization of the Luftwaffe during World War II.) There he first met Hermann Graf, his future wingman on the Eastern Front. In August 1940, Steinbatz was transferred to 9. Staffel (9th Squadron) of JG 52, a squadron of III. Gruppe (3rd Group) and was then assigned to the Luftwaffenmission Rumänien (Luftwaffe Mission Romania) under the command of Generalleutnant Wilhelm Speidel. The military mission from Germany supported General Ion Antonescu in the reorganization of the Rumanian armed forces. III. Gruppe of JG 52 was transferred to Bucharest in mid-October and temporarily renamed I. Gruppe of Jagdgeschwader 28 (JG 28—28th Fighter Wing) until 4 January 1941.

During the Invasion of Yugoslavia of April 1941, III. Gruppe of JG 52 was kept back in reserve to guard the Ploiești oil installations. On 27 May, III. Gruppe flew to Plovdiv, Saloniki, Tatoi Airfield north of Athens and then to Molaoi where he stayed until 10 June. Here, together with other Luftwaffe units, the Gruppe its first combat missions in support of the Battle of Crete. During this campaign, Steinbatz flew ground support missions against Greek forces and other Allied forces.

=== War against the Soviet Union ===
Following its brief deployment in the Balkan Campaign, III. Gruppe was back in Bucharest by mid-June. There, the unit was again subordinated to the Luftwaffenmission Rumänien and equipped with the new, more powerful Messerschmitt Bf 109 F-4 model. On 21 June 1941, III. Gruppe was ordered to Mizil ready for Operation Barbarossa, the German invasion of the Soviet Union. Its primary objective was to provide fighter protection for the oil fields and refineries at Ploiești. The invasion of the Soviet Union began on 22 June. The next day, the Gruppe moved to Mamaia, the northern district of Constanța on the Black Sea coast.

9. Staffel also known as the Karaya-Staffel

The Gruppe moved to Belaya Tserkov on 1 August during the Battle of Kiev and also used an airfield at Yampil from 6 to 8 August. Here on the 4 August, Steinbatz claimed his first aerial victory when he shot down a Polikarpov I-16 fighter southeast of Kiev, while escorting Junkers Ju 87 dive bombers to Brovary. He claimed his second aerial victory over another I-16 fighter on 26 August. The following day, III. Gruppe had reached an airfield named Stschastliwaja about 20 kilometers (12 miles) east-southeast of Oleksandriia where they stayed until 12 September. Flying from Stschastliwaja, Steinbatz claimed an Ilyushin DB-3 bomber on 1 September and an I-16 fighter on 6 September.

On 24 September, III. Gruppe moved to the Poltava Air Base, supporting the 17th Army in the First Battle of Kharkov. Steinbatz claimed an I-26 fighter on 27 September here. The I-26 was an early war German designator for the Yakovlev Yak-1 fighter aircraft. A day later, he shot down an I-16 fighter and a Tupolev SB bomber near Poltava. That day, Steinbatz and his wingman Stabsfeldwebel Johann Klein intercepted seven bombers from 98 DBAP (Dal'nebombardirovochnyy Aviatsionnyy Polk—long-range bomber regiment) escorted by three I-16 fighters which lost one fighter and three bombers. On 9 October, he claimed two I-26 fighters followed by another I-26 fighter on 11 and 14 October respectively. On 23 October, III. Gruppe relocated to Chaplynka in the Crimea. Steinbatz claimed an I-61 fighter, (Note: In the early phases of the war on the Eastern Front, the Luftwaffe sometimes referred to the Mikoyan-Gurevich MiG-3 fighter as an I-61 fighter.) a designator for the Mikoyan-Gurevich MiG-3, on 24 and 27 October, and two I-61 fighters on 28 October.

"Today [8 January 1942] was my lucky day. Early this morning we took off on a free-hunt mission and we actually spotted three Soviets... I flew together with a young comrade who had never been in combat before as the three 'brothers' appeared. Of course I immediately attacked one of the fighters. With a short burst of fire I blew off his left wing and he went down vertically. Pulling up, I saw the second fighter below. He was watching his descending comrade. I dived again and attacked him. I hit his radiator and he made a forced landing. We shot the aircraft on fire. Now the turn had come for the third aircraft, the bomber. My wingman had been attacking him but wasn't able to bring him down. As I approached him, he fired like mad. I came in very close, and then I shot him in flames with a few rounds. Burning, he crashed into a village."

— Steinbatz in a letter to his wife

The Gruppe then moved to an airfield at Taganrog on 2 November where they stayed until 1 January 1942. Steinbatz was credited with 34 aerial victories, making him the fifth most successful fighter pilot of III. Gruppe. On 1 January 1942, III. Gruppe moved to Kharkov where they fought in the Barvenkovo–Lozovaya offensive and remained there until 29 April. Here Steinbatz claimed his first aerial victory in 1942 on 4 January over an unidentified biplane. A day later, he was credited with shooting down an I-16 followed by another I-16 on 7 January. On 8 January, he was credited with three aerial victories, two I-26s and a Vultee V-11 ground attack aircraft, probably referring to the Ilyushin Il-2 ground attack aircraft.

Steinbatz received the Honor Goblet of the Luftwaffe (Ehrenpokal der Luftwaffe) on 19 January and the German Cross in Gold (Deutsches Kreuz in Gold) three days later. On 14 February, he was awarded the Knight's Cross of the Iron Cross (Ritterkreuz des Eisernes Kreuzes) for reaching 42 aerial victories and sent on extended leave. Graf was promoted to Staffelkapitän of 9. Staffel of JG 52 in March, and by the beginning of April, his unit had accumulated over 200 victories in Russia, for the loss of only eight pilots.

=== Crimean campaign ===
On 29 April, III. Gruppe had relocated to Zürichtal, a small village at the Inhul in the former German settlement west of Feodosia in the Crimea during the Crimean campaign. On 1 May, the Gruppe was subordinated to VIII. Fliegerkorps and was supporting the 11th Army in the Battle of the Kerch Peninsula and the Siege of Sevastopol. On 2 May, Steinbatz became an "ace-in-a-day" for the first time when he claimed five I-61s and a Polikarpov I-153 fighter. Three days later, he claimed another I-61 and an I-16 fighter, including his 50th aerial victory. On 8 May, Steinbatz became an "ace-in-a-day" again when he claimed four I-61 fighters, a Sukhoi Su-2 light bomber, a Polikarpov I-15 fighter and an I-153 fighter, which took his total to 58 aerial victories.

On 12 May, German forces launched Operation Fredericus, also referred to as the Second Battle of Kharkov, to eliminate the Izium bridgehead over Seversky Donets. That day, III. Gruppe was moved to the Kharkov-Rogan airfield, southeast of Kharkov and subordinated to the Stab (headquarters unit) of JG 52. Two days later, III. Gruppe predominantly flew fighter escort missions for Ju 87 dive bombers from VIII. Fliegerkorps attacking Soviet ground forces on the northern pincer and claimed 52 aerial victories for the loss of one aircraft damaged. The Gruppe claimed 89 victories in its first two days over Kharkov, with Graf becoming the first pilot in JG 52 to reach the century (on 14 May). Ofw Steinbatz got his 75th on 20 May and although the ground offensive was blunted by the next day, the intense aerial combat continued. He claimed four victories apiece on 1 and 2 June and was awarded the Knight's Cross of the Iron Cross with Oak Leaves (Ritterkreuz des Eisernen Kreuzes mit Eichenlaub) on 2 June for his 83 victories. He was the third non-commissioned officer in the Luftwaffe to receive this honor. The first was Oberfeldwebel Heinrich Hoffmann, who received the distinction on 19 October 1941, the second was Feldwebel Gerhard Köppen who was honored on 27 February 1942.

"After his return he proved absolutely reckless... He entered upon an unparalleled victory march, scoring one victory after another! As he had achieved his No. 80 and was expected to be awarded with the Oak Leaves, I urged him to take some leave. The combats had put a tremendous strain on his nerves. This was shown on several occasions. I grounded him for a couple of days, but then he requested that I allow him to start flying combat sorties again. As I was called to the Führer's Headquarters (on 24 May 1942), I exhorted him to 'cool down a bit'. But I knew that his goal was to reach his '100'."

— Hermann Graf, Staffelkapitän and wingman

On 19 May, the Gruppe moved to Barvinkove where they stayed until 12 June mostly fighting over the encircled Soviet forces in the Izium salient. Here, Steinbatz claimed a Lavochkin-Gorbunov-Gudkov LaGG-3 fighter on 20 May, an I-16 on 21 May, a Mikoyan-Gurevich MiG-1 fighter on 22 and 26 May, and three further MiG-1s on 27 May, another LaGG-3 fighter on 28 May and finally three MiG-1s on 29 May, taking his total to 87 aerial victories claimed by end of May 1942. In June, he claimed his first aerial victories of the month on 2 June when he shot down two MiG-1s and two Su-2 light bombers. On 6 June, Steinbatz claimed a LaGG-3 followed by a MiG-1, another LaGG-3 on 9 June, and a Su-2 light bomber on 10 June, his last while flying from Barvinkove.

On 12 June, the Gruppe relocated to an airfield at Belgorod. On 15 June, Steinbatz claimed four aerial victories east of Vovchansk, his last. Shortly after, he was killed in action when his Bf 109 F-4/R1 (Werknummer 13357—factory number) was hit by Soviet anti-aircraft artillery northwest of Shebekino. The commander of III. Gruppe, Major Hubertus von Bonin, ordered Feldwebel Edmund Rossmann and three other men to search for him. German soldiers in a forward infantry position reported a Bf 109 crashing into a forest from low altitude. Steinbetz's body was never found. Eight days later, on 23 June, Steinbatz was awarded the Knight's Cross of the Iron Cross with Oak Leaves and Swords (Ritterkreuz des Eisernen Kreuzes mit Eichenlaub und Schwertern). He was the 14th member of the Wehrmacht and the only non-commissioned officer to be awarded this honor. At the time of his death, he was the 11th-ranking fighter pilot in the Luftwaffe and second of III. Gruppe.

On 30 June 1942, his father wrote a letter to Adolf Hitler asking for a promotion of his son to an officers rank. On 23 July 1942, the commander-in-chief of the Luftwaffe-Personalamt (LWA—Air Force Staff Office), on orders of Reichsmarschall Hermann Göring, announced the promotion of Steinbatz to Leutnant (Second Lieutenant) of the Reserves, effective as of 1 June 1942.

== Summary of career ==
=== Aerial victory claims ===
According to US historian David T. Zabecki, Steinbatz was credited with 99 aerial victories. Spick also lists him with 99 aerial victories, all of which claimed on the Eastern Front in an unknown number of combat missions. According to Obermaier, he flew approximately 300 combat missions. Berger states that Steinbatz flew 390 combat missions. Mathews and Foreman, authors of Luftwaffe Aces — Biographies and Victory Claims, researched the German Federal Archives and found records for 98 aerial victory claims, plus one further unconfirmed claim, all of which claimed on the Eastern Front.

Chronicle of aerial victories
This and the ♠ (Ace of spades) indicates those aerial victories which made Steinbatz an "ace-in-a-day", a term which designates a fighter pilot who has shot down five or more airplanes in a single day. This and the – (dash) indicates unconfirmed aerial victory claims for which Steinbatz did not receive credit.
Claim	Date	Time	Type	Location	Claim	Date	Time	Type	Location
– 9. Staffel of Jagdgeschwader 52 – Operation Barbarossa — 22 June – 5 December 1941
1	4 August 1941	06:25	I-16	southeast of Kiev	14	28 October 1941	09:55	I-61 (MiG-3)	
2	26 August 1941	18:32	I-16		15	28 October 1941	10:00	I-61 (MiG-3)	southeast of Aibar
3	1 September 1941	11:43	DB-3		16	9 November 1941	14:30	R-10 (Seversky)	
4	6 September 1941	18:23	I-16		17	9 November 1941	14:37	I-16	
5	27 September 1941	12:48	I-26 (Yak-1)		18	17 November 1941	14:40	I-18 (MiG-1)	
6	28 September 1941	08:35	I-16	15 km (9.3 mi) east of Poltava	19	22 November 1941	14:28	I-26 (Yak-1)	
7	28 September 1941	08:37	SB-3	east of Poltava	20	29 November 1941	10:20	I-16	north-northeast of Rostov-on-Don
8	9 October 1941	06:40	I-26 (Yak-1)		21	29 November 1941	10:25	I-16	northeast of Rostov-on-Don
9	9 October 1941	06:42	I-26 (Yak-1)		22	29 November 1941	13:05	I-16	south of Bataysk
10	11 October 1941	07:05	I-26 (Yak-1)		23	2 December 1941	12:15	SB-2	
11	14 October 1941	10:20	I-26 (Yak-1)		24	2 December 1941	12:22	I-16	
12	24 October 1941	12:47	I-61 (MiG-3)		25	3 December 1941	08:03	I-16	
13	27 October 1941	15:41	I-61 (MiG-3)						
– 9. Staffel of Jagdgeschwader 52 – Eastern Front — 6 December 1941 – 28 April 1942
26	6 December 1941	12:50	Il-2	east of Lysogorskaya	35	31 December 1941	13:45	I-16	
27	7 December 1941	13:20	SB-2		36	31 December 1941	13:47	I-16	
28	25 December 1941	09:43	I-16		37	4 January 1941	10:35	biplane (Seversky)	
29	27 December 1941	12:03	I-16		38	5 January 1941	14:40	I-16	
30	27 December 1941	12:06	I-16		39	7 January 1941	08:13	I-16	
31	27 December 1941	14:28	SB-2	northeast of Golodayevka	40	8 January 1942	08:42	I-26 (Yak-1)	
32	27 December 1941	14:32	Il-2	northeast of Golodayevka	41	8 January 1942	08:44	I-26 (Yak-1)	
33	28 December 1941	07:38	I-16		42	8 January 1942	08:45	V-11 (Il-2)	
34	28 December 1941	13:32	I-61 (MiG-3)	southwest of Taganrog	43	26 January 1942	12:44	Pe-2	east of Tschugujew
– 9. Staffel of Jagdgeschwader 52 – Eastern Front — 29 April 1942 – 3 February 1943
44♠	2 May 1942	04:46	I-61 (MiG-3)		72	16 May 1942	08:00	MiG-1	
45♠	2 May 1942	04:50	I-61 (MiG-3)		73	16 May 1942	08:03	MiG-1	
46♠	2 May 1942	11:04	I-153		74	16 May 1942	18:09	MiG-1	
47♠	2 May 1942	11:06	I-61 (MiG-3)		75	17 May 1942	12:35	MiG-1	
48♠	2 May 1942	12:40	I-61 (MiG-3)		76	16 May 1942	17:37	MiG-1	
49♠	2 May 1942	12:43	I-61 (MiG-3)		77	20 May 1942	09:02	LaGG-3	
50	5 May 1942	12:33	I-61 (MiG-3)	Semikolodzy	78	21 May 1942	08:37	I-16	
51	5 May 1942	12:37	I-16		79	22 May 1942	18:25	MiG-1	
52♠	8 May 1942	04:35	Su-2 (Seversky)		80	26 May 1942	08:53	MiG-1	
53♠	8 May 1942	10:48	I-61 (MiG-3)		81	27 May 1942	11:31	MiG-1	
54♠	8 May 1942	10:48	I-61 (MiG-3)		82	27 May 1942	11:32	MiG-1	
55♠	8 May 1942	10:59	I-15		83	27 May 1942	11:36	MiG-1	
56♠	8 May 1942	11:03	I-153		84	28 May 1942	14:17	LaGG-3	
57♠	8 May 1942	15:40	I-61 (MiG-3)		85	29 May 1942	09:10	MiG-1	
58♠	8 May 1942	15:44	I-61 (MiG-3)		86	29 May 1942	09:12	MiG-1	
59	9 May 1942	12:25	MiG-1	20 km (12 mi) southeast of Akmonaj	87	29 May 1942	09:18	MiG-1	
60	9 May 1942	12:29	MiG-1		88	2 June 1942	08:26	MiG-1	
61	9 May 1942	12:31	MiG-1		89	2 June 1942	08:28	MiG-1	
62	11 May 1942	17:48	MiG-1		90	2 June 1942	11:20	Su-2 (Seversky)	
63	12 May 1942	19:04	I-16		91	2 June 1942	11:34	Su-2 (Seversky)	
64	13 May 1942	16:25	Su-2 (Seversky)		92	6 June 1942	04:16	LaGG-3	
65	13 May 1942	16:27	Su-2 (Seversky)	5 km (3.1 mi) north of Bol.-Babka	93	9 June 1942	19:10	MiG-1	
66	13 May 1942	16:2	Su-2 (Seversky)	Warowaja	94	9 June 1942	19:12	LaGG-3	
67	14 May 1942	07:21	MiG-1	5 km (3.1 mi) southeast of Solhow	95	10 June 1942	15:25	Su-2 (Seversky)	
68	14 May 1942	07:27	MiG-1		—	15 June 1942	—	unknown	
69	14 May 1942	07:21	MiG-1	5 km (3.1 mi) southeast of Stary Saltov	96	15 June 1942	14:47	Il-2	15 km (9.3 mi) east of Vovchansk
70	14 May 1942	18:25	I-16		97	15 June 1942	14:50	Il-2	15 km (9.3 mi) east of Vovchansk
71	15 May 1942	16:07	Su-2 (Seversky)		98	15 June 942	14:54	LaGG-3	15 km (9.3 mi) east of Vovchansk

=== Awards ===
- Combined Pilots-Observation Badge
- Crimea Shield
- Wound Badge in Black
- Iron Cross (1939)
  - 2nd Class (1941)
  - 1st Class (1941)
- Front Flying Clasp of the Luftwaffe in Gold with Pennant "300"
- Honor Goblet of the Luftwaffe on 19 January 1942 as Unteroffizier and pilot (Note: According to Obermaier and Williamson on 8 December 1941.)
- German Cross in Gold on 22 January 1942 as Feldwebel in the 9./Jagdgeschwader 52
- Knight's Cross of the Iron Cross with Oak Leaves and Swords
  - Knight's Cross on 14 February 1942 as Feldwebel and pilot in the 9./Jagdgeschwader 52
  - 96th Oak Leaves on 2 June 1942 as Oberfeldwebel and pilot in the 9./Jagdgeschwader 52
  - 14th Swords on 23 June 1942 (posthumous) as Oberfeldwebel and pilot in the 9./Jagdgeschwader 52
