= Shatalovo =

Shatalovo (Russian: Шаталово) is the name of several rural localities in Russia:

- Shatalovo, Pskov Oblast, a village in Pustoshkinsky District of Pskov Oblast
- Shatalovo, Smolensk Oblast, a village in Shatalovskoye Rural Settlement of Pochinkovsky District of Smolensk Oblast
- Shatalovo, Chernsky District, Tula Oblast, a village in Yerzhinskaya Rural Administration of Chernsky District of Tula Oblast
- Shatalovo, Kamensky District, Tula Oblast, a village in Molchanovsky Rural Okrug of Kamensky District of Tula Oblast
- Shatalovo, Vologda Oblast, a village in Kubensky Selsoviet of Vologodsky District of Vologda Oblast
