= Johannes Bunzek =

German World War II fighter pilot

- Born: 22 May 1922; Groß-Strehlitz
- Died: 11 December 1943 (aged 21); Nikopol, Ukraine
- Cause of death: Killed in action
- Military career
- Allegiance: Nazi Germany
- Branch: Luftwaffe
- Service years: 1941–1943
- Rank: Leutnant (second lieutenant)
- Unit: JG 52
- Conflicts: World War II: Battle of the Caucasus; Battle of Kursk; Lower Dnieper Offensive †
- Awards: Knight's Cross of the Iron Cross

Johannes Bunzek (22 May 1922 – 11 December 1943) was a German Luftwaffe ace credited with 75 victories, all on the Eastern Front. Knight's Cross of the Iron Cross during World War II. Bunzek was killed on 11 December 1943 over Nikopol, Ukraine. He was posthumously awarded the Knight's Cross of the Iron Cross on 6 April 1944.

== Early life and career ==
Bunzek was born on 22 May 1922 in Groß-Strehlitz, present-day Strzelce Opolskie in southern Poland, at the time in the Province of Upper Silesia of the Weimar Republic. He joined the military service of the Luftwaffe and completed his training with Luftkriegsschule 4 (LKS 4—4th Air War School) at Fürstenfeldbruck Air Base in July 1942. (Note: Flight training in the Luftwaffe progressed through the levels A1, A2 and B1, B2, referred to as A/B flight training. A training included theoretical and practical training in aerobatics, navigation, long-distance flights and dead-stick landings. The B courses included high-altitude flights, instrument flights, night landings and training to handle the aircraft in difficult situations.) On 1 December 1942, he was promoted to Leutnant (second lieutenant). Bunzek was then posted to 7. Staffel (7th squadron) of Jagdgeschwader 52 (JG 52—52nd Fighter Wing) in late 1942. At the time, 7. Staffel was commanded by Hauptmann Adalbert Sommer who was replaced by Oberleutnant Walter Krupinski on 15 March 1943. The Staffel was part of III. Gruppe of JG 52 under command of Major Hubertus von Bonin.

== World War II ==
World War II in Europe had begun on Friday 1 September 1939 when German forces invaded Poland. Germany had launched Operation Barbarossa, the invasion of the Soviet Union on 22 June 1941. In late 1942, III. Gruppe was based at an airfield named Soldatskaja, located approximately halfway between Mozdok and Pyatigorsk on the Eastern Front. The Gruppe stayed at this airfield until 1 January 1943. During this period, the pilots occasionally also operated from airfields at Mozdok (15, 18, 19, 21, 22 and 23 October) and from Digora (5 to 17 November 1942), supporting Army Group A in the Battle of the Caucasus. On 1 April 1943, III. Gruppe was moved to the combat area of the Kuban bridgehead where it was based at an airfield at Taman. Operating from Taman until 2 July, III. Gruppe also flew missions from Kerch on 12 May, from Sarabuz and Saky on 14 May, Zürichtal, present-day Solote Pole, a village near the urban settlement Kirovske on 23 May, and Yevpatoria on 25/26 June. Here, Bunzek claimed his first aerial victory over a Lavochkin-Gorbunov-Gudkov LaGG-3 fighter on 28 May.

III./JG 52 emblem

In preparation for Operation Citadel, III. Gruppe was relocated to the central sector of the eastern Front. The Gruppe first moved to Zaporizhzhia and then to Ugrim on 3 July. There, under the command of Luftflotte 4, they supported Army Group South fighting on the southern flank of the salient. On 5 July, the first day of the Battle of Kursk, Hauptmann Günther Rall replaced von Bonin as Gruppenkommandeur (group commander) of III. Gruppe. That day, Bunzek claimed two LaGG-3 fighters shot down. The next day, he was credited with another LaGG-3 and an Ilyushin Il-2 ground-attack aircraft shot down. For seven aerial victories claimed, Bunzek was awarded the Iron Cross 2nd Class (Eisernes Kreuz zweiter Klasse) on 14 July 1943. On 2 August, III. Gruppe moved to an airfield at Warwarowka, located south of Belgorod, where they stayed for three days. That day, Bunzek was awarded the Iron Cross 1st Class (Eisernes Kreuz erster Klasse). On 5 August, the Gruppe moved to an airfield at Kharkov-Rogan airfield, southeast of Kharkov. Flying from this airfield, Bunzek claimed three aerial victories, all LaGG-3s, until III. Gruppe was ordered to Kharkov-Waitschenko, southeast of Kharkov-Rogan, on 11 August.

On 20 August, the Gruppe moved to Kuteinykove near Stalino, present-day Donetsk, where Bunzek became an "ace-in-a-day" the following day. Here on 21 August, Bunzek claimed four LaGG-3 fighters and a single Il-2 ground-attack aircraft shot down, taking his total to 23 aerial victories. The next day, he claimed three further aerial victories which included two LaGG-3s and an Il-2. On 9 September, III. Gruppe moved to an airfield at Dnipropetrovsk, present-day Dnipro, where they stayed until 24 September. Here, Bunzek increased his total to 48 aerial victories claimed. On 24 September, III. Gruppe moved to an airfield located just west of Zaporizhzhia. There, the Gruppe fought over the area between the lower Dnieper and the Crimea during the Battle of the Dnieper until 15 October. Here on 18 September, Obleser claimed his 50th aerial victory on 27 September. In this timeframe, Bunzek claimed 28 further aerial victories, taking his total to 75.

On 1 November, III. Gruppe was moved to Apostolove fighting in the combat area between Nikopol and Zaporizhzhia. Adverse whether conditions rendered the airfield unusable and the Gruppe temporarily used an airfield near Kirovograd from 12 to 20 November. Bunzek received the Honor Goblet of the Luftwaffe (Ehrenpokal der Luftwaffe) on 8 November and the German Cross in Gold (Deutsches Kreuz in Gold) on 14 November. On 11 December, Bunzek was killed in action in his Messerschmitt Bf 109 G-6 (Werknummer 20644—factory number) following combat with Il-2 ground-attack aircraft and LaGG-3 fighters during the Battle of the Dnieper. He was initially reported as missing in action west of Nikopol. According to Barbas, this combat took place near Apostolove while fighting over the bridgehead established by Soviet forces at Nikopol. Prien, Stemmer, Rodeike and Bock place this southwest of Verblyuzhka which is approximately 100 kilometers (62 miles) northwest of Apostolove. Bunzek was posthumously awarded the Knight's Cross of the Iron Cross (Ritterkreuz des Eisernen Kreuzes) on 6 April 1944. His 78 aerial victories claimed made Bunzek the fifth most successful fighter pilot of III. Gruppe at the time of his death.

== Summary of career ==
=== Aerial victory claims ===
According to US historian David T. Zabecki, Bunzek was credited with 75 aerial victories. Spick also lists him with 75 aerial victories in an unknown number of combat missions, all of which claimed on the Eastern Front. Weal states that in addition to his 75 aerial victories, he also had 30 further unconfirmed claims. Mathews and Foreman, authors of Luftwaffe Aces — Biographies and Victory Claims, researched the German Federal Archives and found records for 78 aerial victory claims, plus two further unconfirmed claims, all of which claimed on the Eastern Front.

Victory claims were logged to a map-reference (PQ = Planquadrat), for example "PQ 34 Ost 76791". The Luftwaffe grid map (Jägermeldenetz) covered all of Europe, western Russia and North Africa and was composed of rectangles measuring 15 minutes of latitude by 30 minutes of longitude, an area of about 360 square miles (930 km^{2}). These sectors were then subdivided into 36 smaller units to give a location area 3 km × 4 km (1.9 mi × 2.5 mi) in size.

Chronicle of aerial victories
This and the ♠ (Ace of spades) indicates those aerial victories which made Bunzek an "ace-in-a-day", a term which designates a fighter pilot who has shot down five or more airplanes in a single day. This and the – (dash) indicates unconfirmed aerial victory claims for which Bunzek did not receive credit. This and the ? (question mark) indicates information discrepancies listed by Barbas, Prien, Stemmer, Rodeike, Bock, Mathews and Foreman.
| Claim | Date | Time | Type | Location | Claim | Date | Time | Type | Location |
– 7. Staffel of Jagdgeschwader 52 – Eastern Front – 4 February – 11 December 1943
| 1 | 28 May 1943 | 06:40 | LaGG-3 | PQ 34 Ost 76791 east of Trojzkaja | 41 | 18 September 1943 | 16:10 | Il-2 | PQ 34 Ost 68141 |
| 2 | 5 July 1943 | 04:10 | LaGG-3 | PQ 35 Ost 61453; 15 km (9.3 mi) northeast of Belgorod | 42 | 19 September 1943 | 10:15 | LaGG-3 | PQ 34 Ost 58662; 20 km (12 mi) northeast of Bolschoj Tokmak |
| 3 | 5 July 1943 | 18:08 | LaGG-3 | PQ 35 Ost 61633; 15 km (9.3 mi) north of Vovchansk | 43 | 20 September 1943 | 08:10 | Il-2 m.H. (Note: The "m.H." refers to an Ilyushin Il-2 with rear gunner (mit Heckschütze).) | PQ 34 Ost 58142 northwest of Zaporizhzhia |
| 4 | 6 July 1943 | 10:23 | LaGG-3 | PQ 35 Ost 61354; 15 km (9.3 mi) west of Tomarovka | 44 | 20 September 1943 | 08:14 | Il-2 m.H. | PQ 34 Ost 58144, northeast of Zaporizhzhia northwest of Zaporizhzhia |
| 5 | 6 July 1943 | 10:40 | Il-2 m.H. | PQ 35 Ost 61284; 25 km (16 mi) north-northeast of Belgorod | 45 | 20 September 1943 | 08:20 | Il-2 m.H. | PQ 34 Ost 58153 northeast of Zaporizhzhia |
| 6 | 7 July 1943 | 08:50 | LaGG-3 | PQ 35 Ost 61241; 10 km (6.2 mi) south of Prokhorovka | 46 | 21 September 1943 | 16:11 | Il-2 m.H. | PQ 34 Ost 58144; 20 km (12 mi) east of Zaporizhzhia |
| 7 | 12 July 1943 | 13:45 | LaGG-3 | PQ 35 Ost 61212; 10 km (6.2 mi) southwest of Prokhorovka | 47 | 21 September 1943 | 16:12 | Il-2 m.H. | PQ 34 Ost 58271; 25 km (16 mi) east of Zaporizhzhia |
| 8 | 31 July 1943 | 10:00 | Il-2 | PQ 35 Ost 54661 west of Bolkhov | 48 | 24 September 1943 | 11:14 | LaGG-3 | PQ 34 Ost 58891; 15 km (9.3 mi) east-southeast of Zaporizhzhia |
| 9 | 3 August 1943 | 06:20 | LaGG-3 | PQ 35 Ost 61412; 15 km (9.3 mi) north of Belgorod | 49 | 26 September 1943 | 07:19 | LaGG-3 | PQ 34 Ost 58272; 25 km (16 mi) east of Zaporizhzhia |
| 10 | 7 August 1943 | 08:50 | LaGG-3 | PQ 35 Ost 61472; 5 km (3.1 mi) south of Belgorod | 50 | 27 September 1943 | 05:55 | Il-2 m.H. | PQ 34 Ost 58552 southeast of Vasilyevka |
| 11 | 7 August 1943 | 12:05 | LaGG-3 | PQ 35 Ost 61383 vicinity of Orlovka | 51? (Note: According to Prien, Stemmer, Rodeike and Bock, this claim is attributed to the 7. Staffel.) | 27 September 1943 | 14:21 | LaGG-3 | PQ 58192; 15 km (9.3 mi) east-southeast of Zaporizhzhia |
| 12 | 8 August 1943 | 12:55 | LaGG-3 | PQ 35 Ost 60244; 25 km (16 mi) east-southeast of Kharkov | 52 | 28 September 1943 | 06:05 | Il-2 m.H. | PQ 34 Ost 48464; 25 km (16 mi) south-southwest of Zaporizhzhia |
| 13 | 12 August 1943 | 16:00 | LaGG-3 | PQ 35 Ost 51822; 15 km (9.3 mi) southwest of Zolochiv | 53 | 29 September 1943 | 14:11 | Il-2 m.H. | PQ 34 Ost 58674; 10 km (6.2 mi) northwest of Bolschoj Tokmak |
| 14 | 17 August 1943 | 05:21 | LaGG-3 | PQ 35 Ost 70791, Tichocki; 20 km (12 mi) southeast of Izium | 54 | 29 September 1943 | 14:33 | Il-2 m.H. | PQ 34 Ost 58594; 20 km (12 mi) west of Bolschoj Tokmak |
| 15 | 19 August 1943 | 12:56 | LaGG-3 | PQ 34 Ost 88293, southwest of Kuibyschewo; 15 km (9.3 mi) east of Jalisawehino | 55 | 30 September 1943 | 05:55 | P-39 | PQ 34 Ost 58681; 5 km (3.1 mi) north of Bolschoj Tokmak |
| 16 | 19 August 1943 | 13:10 | LaGG-3 | PQ 34 Ost 88391 | 56 | 30 September 1943 | 16:30 | P-39 | PQ 34 Ost 58432; 20 km (12 mi) west of Bolschoj Tokmak |
| 17 | 19 August 1943 | 17:15 | LaGG-3 | PQ 34 Ost 88754; 60 km (37 mi) west-southwest of Taganrog | 57 | 1 October 1943 | 06:05 | Il-2 m.H. | PQ 34 Ost 48432; 20 km (12 mi) southwest of Zaporizhzhia |
| 18 | 20 August 1943 | 06:07 | Il-2 | PQ 34 Ost 88263; 10 km (6.2 mi) east of Marinowka | 58 | 3 October 1943 | 10:17 | LaGG-3 | PQ 34 Ost 58673; 10 km (6.2 mi) northwest of Bolschoj Tokmak |
| 19♠ | 21 August 1943 | 05:34 | LaGG-3 | PQ 34 Ost 88283, southwest of Kuibyschewo; 1 km (0.62 mi) south of Jalisawehino | 59 | 3 October 1943 | 15:08 | Il-2 m.H. | PQ 34 Ost 58133; 20 km (12 mi) northeast of Zaporizhzhia |
| 20♠ | 21 August 1943 | 07:16 | LaGG-3 | PQ 34 Ost 88254, Kalinowka vicinity of Dmitrijewka | 60 | 3 October 1943 | 15:13 | LaGG-3 | PQ 34 Ost 58152 northeast of Zaporizhzhia |
| 21♠ | 21 August 1943 | 07:25 | LaGG-3 | PQ 34 Ost 88411; 20 km (12 mi) southwest of Jalisawehino | 61 | 7 October 1943 | 06:23? (Note: According to Barbas, and Mathews and Foreman, claimed at 06:25.) | LaGG-3 | PQ 34 Ost 49174; 55 km (34 mi) east-northeast of Mironowka |
| 22♠ | 21 August 1943 | 13:10 | Il-2 | PQ 34 Ost 88274; 15 km (9.3 mi) west-southwest of Jalisawehino | 62 | 7 October 1943 | 15:33 | LaGG-3 | PQ 34 Ost 49363; 45 km (28 mi) west-northwest of Dnipropetrovsk |
| 23♠ | 21 August 1943 | 17:32 | LaGG-3 | PQ 88233; 30 km (19 mi) west-southwest of Rovenki | 63 | 9 October 1943 | 08:55 | LaGG-3 | PQ 34 Ost 49333; 55 km (34 mi) west-northwest of Dnipropetrovsk |
| 24 | 22 August 1943 | 08:16 | LaGG-3 | PQ 34 Ost 88293, southwest of Kuibyschewo; 15 km (9.3 mi) east of Jalisawehino | 64 | 9 October 1943 | 15:35 | P-39 | PQ 34 Ost 58564, northeast of Michailowka vicinity of Kalinowka |
| 25 | 22 August 1943 | 10:50 | LaGG-3 | PQ 34 Ost 88283, southwest of Kuibyschewo; 1 km (0.62 mi) south of Jalisawehino | 65 | 10 October 1943 | 08:10 | LaGG-3 | PQ 34 Ost 58154 northeast of Zaporizhzhia |
| 26 | 22 August 1943 | 17:59 | Il-2 | PQ 34 Ost 88421; 20 km (12 mi) south of Jalisawehino | 66 | 10 October 1943 | 08:43 | Il-2 m.H. | PQ 34 Ost 58124; 15 km (9.3 mi) north-northeast of Zaporizhzhia |
| 27 | 23 August 1943 | 06:16 | P-39 | PQ 34 Ost 88263 | 67 | 11 October 1943 | 10:08 | Il-2 m.H. | PQ 34 Ost 58123; 15 km (9.3 mi) north-northeast of Zaporizhzhia |
| 28 | 26 August 1943 | 11:11 | P-39 | PQ 34 Ost 88281; 5 km (3.1 mi) southwest of Jalisawehino | 68 | 11 October 1943 | 10:12 | Il-2 m.H. | PQ 34 Ost 58124; 15 km (9.3 mi) north-northeast of Zaporizhzhia |
| 29 | 27 August 1943 | 12:10 | P-39 | PQ 34 Ost 88281; 5 km (3.1 mi) southwest of Jalisawehino | 69 | 11 October 1943 | 12:45 | Il-2 m.H. | PQ 34 Ost 58154 northeast of Zaporizhzhia |
| 30 | 27 August 1943 | 17:35 | P-39 | PQ 34 Ost 88194; 10 km (6.2 mi) east of Kuteinykove | 70 | 11 October 1943 | 15:17 | LaGG-3 | PQ 34 Ost 58141, northeast of Zaporizhzhia northwest of Zaporizhzhia |
| 31 | 27 August 1943 | 17:37 | P-39 | PQ 34 Ost 88194; 10 km (6.2 mi) east of Kuteinykove | 71 | 12 October 1943 | 06:50 | Il-2 m.H. | PQ 34 Ost 58152 northeast of Zaporizhzhia |
| 32 | 28 August 1943 | 11:00 | LaGG-3 | PQ 34 Ost 88612; 30 km (19 mi) northwest of Taganrog | 72 | 12 October 1943 | 06:51 | Il-2 m.H. | PQ 34 Ost 58154 northeast of Zaporizhzhia |
| 33 | 28 August 1943 | 12:35 | LaGG-3 | PQ 34 Ost 88354; 20 km (12 mi) south-southwest of Kuteinykove | 73 | 13 October 1943 | 10:48 | LaGG-3 | PQ 34 Ost 57183; 10 km (6.2 mi) southwest of Melitopol |
| 34 | 5 September 1943 | 12:22 | Boston | PQ 34 Ost 79883; 10 km (6.2 mi) northwest of Stalino | 74 | 13 October 1943 | 10:50 | LaGG-3 | PQ 34 Ost 57193; 10 km (6.2 mi) south of Melitopol |
| 35 | 5 September 1943 | 15:08 | LaGG-3 | PQ 34 Ost 79684; 20 km (12 mi) west of Gorlowka | 75 | 14 October 1943 | 15:25 | LaGG-3 | PQ 34 Ost 58125; 15 km (9.3 mi) north-northeast of Zaporizhzhia |
| 36 | 14 September 1943 | 09:00 | Boston | PQ 34 Ost 79574; Black Sea, 65 km (40 mi) west-southwest of Gelendzhik | 76 | 15 October 1943 | 10:15 | Boston | PQ 34 Ost 49821; 25 km (16 mi) south-southwest of Werchnedjeprowak |
| 37 | 14 September 1943 | 15:16 | Boston | PQ 34 Ost 79712; 15 km (9.3 mi) south of Grischino | 77 | 30 November 1943 | 11:45 | LaGG-3 | PQ 34 Ost 49781; 15 km (9.3 mi) north-northwest of Nikopol |
| 38 | 15 September 1943 | 12:17 | Yak-9? (Note: According to Barbas, and Mathews and Foreman, claimed as a Lavochkin-Gorbunov-Gudkov aircraft of unknown type.) | PQ 34 Ost 68642 | 78 | 7 December 1943 | 12:37 | LaGG | PQ 34 Ost 29634, south of Petro-Nikolayevka |
| 39 | 18 September 1943 | 13:30 | LaGG-3 | PQ 34 Ost 69341 | — ? (Note: This unconfirmed claim is not listed by Barbas.) | 11 December 1943 | — | Il-2 | southwest of Verblyuzhka |
| 40 | 18 September 1943 | 16:05 | Il-2 | PQ 34 Ost 68893 | — ? | 11 December 1943 | — | La-5 | southwest of Verblyuzhka |

=== Awards ===
- Iron Cross (1939)
  - 2nd Class (14 July 1943)
  - 1st Class (2 August 1943)
- Honor Goblet of the Luftwaffe on 8 November 1943 as Leutnant and pilot
- German Cross in Gold 14 November 1943 as Leutnant in the 7./Jagdgeschwader 52
- Knight's Cross of the Iron Cross on 6 April 1944 as Leutnant and pilot in the 7./Jagdgeschwader 52
