= Shatalovo, Vologda Oblast =

Shatalovo Шаталово
- Village
- Location within Vologda Oblast Location within Russia
- Coordinates: 59°22′N 39°43′E
- Country: Russia
- Region: Vologda Oblast
- District: Vologodsky District
- Time zone: UTC+3:00

Shatalovo (Russian: Шаталово) is a rural locality (a village) in Kubenskoye Rural Settlement, Vologodsky District, Vologda Oblast, Russia. The population was 3 as of 2002.

== Geography ==
Shatalovo is located 26 km northwest of Vologda (the district's administrative centre) by road. Ivanovskoye is the nearest rural locality.
