= Heinrich Hoffmann (pilot) =

German World War II fighter pilot

- Heinrich Hoffmann
- Born: 8 March 1913; Worms, Germany
- Died: 3 October 1941 (aged 28); MIA near Shatalovo, Russian SFSR
- Military career
- Allegiance: Nazi Germany
- Branch: Luftwaffe
- Service years: 1937–1941
- Rank: Oberfeldwebel
- Units: JG 77, JG 51
- Conflicts: See battles World War II: Battle of Britain; Operation Barbarossa (MIA)
- Awards: Knight's Cross of the Iron Cross with Oak Leaves (posthumously)

Heinrich Hoffmann (8 March 1913 – 3 October 1941) was a German fighter ace in the Luftwaffe during World War II. Hoffmann was credited with 63 aerial victories in 261 combat missions and was the first non-commissioned officer and first posthumous Wehrmacht recipient of the Knight's Cross of the Iron Cross with Oak Leaves, the highest award in the military and paramilitary forces of Nazi Germany during World War II. He was "ace-in-a-day" twice, shooting down five aircraft on a single day.

== Early life and career ==
Hoffmann, the son of carpenter master craftsman Ernst Hoffmann, was born on 8 March 1913 in Pfiffigheim. Pfiffigheim is a borough of Worms, at the time in the Grand Duchy of Hesse and by Rhine, a constituent state of the German Empire. Interested in flight, he was an active member of the Hitler Youth and later with the National Socialist Flyers Corps where he received his first flight training in 1936.

He joined the Luftwaffe in 1937 and was promoted to Unteroffizier (corporal, non-commissioned officer) of the Reserve in 1938. Following fighter pilot training, (Note: Flight training in the Luftwaffe progressed through the levels A1, A2 and B1, B2, referred to as A/B flight training. A training included theoretical and practical training in aerobatics, navigation, long-distance flights and dead-stick landings. The B courses included high-altitude flights, instrument flights, night landings and training to handle the aircraft in difficult situations.) he was assigned to the 3. Staffel (3rd squadron) of Jagdgeschwader 77 (JG 77—77th Fighter Wing) on 18 May 1940. (Note: For an explanation of Luftwaffe unit designations see Organization of the Luftwaffe during World War II.) The squadron was later re-designated and as of 21 November 1940 was known as 12. Staffel (12th squadron) of Jagdgeschwader 51 (JG 51—51st Fighter Wing). Initially, the Staffel was led by Oberleutnant Rudolf Resch before command transferred to Oberleutnant Karl-Gottfried Nordmann, and subordinated to IV. Gruppe (4th group) headed by Hauptmann Johannes Janke.

== World War II ==
World War II in Europe began on Friday, 1 September 1939, when German forces invaded Poland. Hoffmann claimed his first aerial victory over a Royal Air Force (RAF) aircraft on 7 September 1940 in the Battle of Britain. In total, he flew 147 combat missions over the English Channel and Britain. On 1 March 1941, IV. Gruppe was placed under command of Major Friedrich Beckh. The Gruppe was withdrawn from the English Channel and relocated to Mönchengladbach on 7 June for a brief period of replenishment.

=== Operation Barbarossa ===
On 15 June, IV. Gruppe of JG 51 began transferring east and was located at an airfield named Krzewicze, located approximately 70 kilometers (43 miles) west of Brest-Litovsk. On 22 June, German forces launched Operation Barbarossa, the German invasion of the Soviet Union. JG 51 was subordinated to II. Fliegerkorps (2nd Air Corps), which as part of Luftflotte 2 (Air Fleet 2). JG 51 area of operation during Operation Barbarossa was over the right flank of Army Group Center in the combat area of the 2nd Panzer Group as well as the 4th Army. Hoffmann claimed his second aerial victory on 23 June, the second day of the invasion, when he shot down a Tupolev SB bomber. After his 12th victory, he was awarded the Iron Cross 2nd Class (Eisernes Kreuz 2. Klasse) on 10 July 1941 followed by the Iron Cross 1st Class (Eisernes Kreuz 1. Klasse) on 28 July. He claimed 20 aerial victories during July and 25 in August. He often flew as wingman to Heinrich Bär, contributing to Bär's record of 220 claimed kills, pilot slang for the destruction of an enemy aircraft. On 22 July 1941 Hoffmann claimed his 23rd aerial victory of the war over an Ilyushin Il-2. The Il-2 Shturmovik was a heavily armoured ground attack aircraft which was very difficult to shoot down. Hoffmann became an expert by aiming for the Il-2's non-retractable oil cooler. These kills are listed as "R-3s" on his personal victory list.

He achieved his 33rd aerial victory on 2 August 1941, shooting down three Polikarpov R-5s, one Polikarpov I-15 and two Neman R-10 bombers, making him an "ace-in-a-day". Hoffmann received the Knight's Cross of the Iron Cross (Ritterkreuz des Eisernen Kreuzes) after 40 aerial victories on 12 August 1941. He also destroyed three locomotives and 10 trucks in numerous ground support missions He claimed his 50th aerial victory on 2 September 1941 by destroying four R-3s, which may have been R-5s or Polikarpov R-Zs. Two days later he claimed two Ilyushin DB-3s and one Mikoyan-Gurevich MiG-3. On 8 September, Hoffmann claimed two more Tupolev SBs, bringing his total to 55 aerial victories. These were his last successes on the Leningrad front. His unit, IV./JG 51, was relocated further south.

On 3 October 1941, the Luftwaffe officially listed Oberfeldwebel (Staff Sergeant) Hoffmann as missing in action after a low altitude engagement with several Il-2s near Shatalovo in the early evening hours. He was flying the Messerschmitt Bf 109F-2 Werknummer (factory number) 12876 and may have been shot down by the Soviet 233 IAP's (233rd Fighter Aviation Regiment) Starshiy Leytenant Sergeyev, who claimed his first aerial victory in the vicinity where Hoffmann disappeared. (Note: IAP—Istrebitelny Aviatsionny Polk (Fighter Aviation Regiment—Истребительный Авиационный Полк)) Posthumously he was awarded the Knight's Cross of the Iron Cross with Oak Leaves (Ritterkreuz des Eisernen Kreuzes mit Eichenlaub) on 19 October 1941, the 36th officer or soldier of the Wehrmacht so honored. This presentation was the first to a non-commissioned officer and the first made posthumously.

== Summary of career ==
=== Aerial victory claims ===
According to US historian David T. Zabecki, Hoffmann was credited with 63 aerial victories. Spick also lists him with 63 aerial victories, one during the Battle of Britain and 62 on the Eastern Front, claimed in 258 combat missions. Obermaier lists him with 261 combat missions. Mathews and Foreman, authors of Luftwaffe Aces — Biographies and Victory Claims, researched the German Federal Archives and found records for 63 aerial victory claims, one of which on the Western Front, and 62 Soviet Air Forces piloted aircraft on the Eastern Front.

Chronicle of aerial victories
This and the ♠ (Ace of spades) indicates those aerial victories which made Hoffmann an "ace-in-a-day", a term which designates a fighter pilot who has shot down five or more airplanes in a single day. This and the ? (question mark) indicates information discrepancies listed by Prien, Stemmer, Rodeike, Bock, Mathews, and Foreman.
Claim	Date	Time	Type	Location	Claim	Date	Time	Type	Location
– 3. Staffel of Jagdgeschwader 77 –
1	7 September 1940	18:30	Spitfire						
– 12. Staffel of Jagdgeschwader 51 – Operation Barbarossa — 22 June – 3 October 1941
2	23 June 1941	19:32	SB-2? (Note: According to Mathews and Foreman claimed as a Tupolev SB-3.)		33♠	2 August 1941	19:39	R-3 (Il-2)	
3	24 June 1941	09:28	SB-2		34	3 August 1941	14:16	Pe-2	
4	28 June 1941	18:40	DB-3		35	9 August 1941	10:50	I-18 (MiG-1)	
5	29 June 1941	18:55	R-10 (Seversky)		36	9 August 1941	18:15	I-18 (MiG-1)	
6	30 June 1941	18:50	DB-3		37	9 August 1941	19:05	SB-3? (Note: According to Mathews and Foreman claimed as a Tupolev SB-2.)	
7	30 June 1941	18:51	DB-3		38	11 August 1941	06:32	I-18 (MiG-1)	
8	2 July 1941	18:30	DB-3		39	11 August 1941	06:37	DB-3	
9	3 July 1941	19:50	DB-3		40	12 August 1941	08:05	I-18 (MiG-1)	
10	4 July 1941	15:12	SB-2		41	15 August 1941	10:40	I-18 (MiG-1)	
11	4 July 1941	15:14	SB-2		42	20 August 1941	09:25	R-5	
12	5 July 1941	06:35	DB-3	10 km (6.2 mi) east of Borisov	43	20 August 1941	09:26	R-5	
13	5 July 1941	17:45	I-16		44	22 August 1941	12:32	I-153	
14	9 July 1941	11:25	DB-3		45	22 August 1941	12:36	I-153	
15	9 July 1941	18:00	DB-3		46	22 August 1941	12:52	DB-3	
16	11 July 1941	05:45	Pe-2		47	2 September 1941	05:18	R-3 (Il-2)	
17	11 July 1941	05:46	Pe-2		48	2 September 1941	05:23	R-3 (Il-2)	
18	13 July 1941	19:35	Pe-2		49	2 September 1941	05:25	R-3 (Il-2)	
19	14 July 1941	16:15	Pe-2		50	2 September 1941	05:29	R-3 (Il-2)	
20	16 July 1941	09:25	DB-3		51	4 September 1941	11:15	I-18 (MiG-1)	
21	16 July 1941	09:28	DB-3		52	4 September 1941	11:53	DB-3	
22	20 July 1941	17:10	DB-3		53	4 September 1941	11:56	DB-3	
23	24 July 1941	12:08	Pe-2		54	8 September 1941	08:55	SB-3	
24	26 July 1941	09:00	DB-3		55	8 September 1941	08:57	SB-3	
25	27 July 1941	07:55	I-153		56♠	16 September 1941	08:30	R-3 (Il-2)	
26	27 July 1941	15:20	I-18 (MiG-1)		57♠	16 September 1941	08:33	R-3 (Il-2)	
27	31 July 1941	19:20	R-10 (Seversky)		58♠	16 September 1941	13:28	I-18 (MiG-1)	
28♠	2 August 1941	17:12	R-5		59♠	16 September 1941	13:31	SB-2	
29♠	2 August 1941	17:35	I-153		60♠	16 September 1941	13:33	SB-2	
30♠	2 August 1941	19:30	R-10 (Seversky)		61	17 September 1941	17:00	R-3? (Note: According to Mathews and Foreman claimed as a Mikoyan-Gurevich MiG-1.)	
31♠	2 August 1941	19:31	R-10 (Seversky)		62	17 September 1941	17:02	R-3?	
32♠	2 August 1941	19:37	R-3 (Il-2)		63	3 October 1941	09:30	I-18 (MiG-1)	

=== Awards ===
- Iron Cross (1939)
  - 2nd Class (10 July 1941)
  - 1st Class (28 July 1941)
- Front Flying Clasp of the Luftwaffe for fighter pilots (Note: see image in infobox)
- Knight's Cross of the Iron Cross with Oak Leaves
  - Knight's Cross on 12 August 1941 as Oberfeldwebel and pilot in the 12/Jagdgeschwader 51
  - 36th Oak Leaves on 19 October 1941 as Oberfeldwebel and pilot in the 12/Jagdgeschwader 51

== See also ==
- List of people who disappeared
