= Emil Darjes =

Nazi German fighter pilot

- Military career
- Allegiance: Nazi Germany
- Branch: Luftwaffe
- Unit: Jagdgeschwader 54
- Conflicts: Second World War

Emil Darjes was a Luftwaffe fighter pilot in World War 2. He was a member of the German Luftwaffe and collected a total of 82 confirmed kills. He was a part of the unit JG 54, known for their symbol The Green Heart.
