= Anton Resch =

German World War II fighter pilot

- Born: 26 November 1921; Stolberg, Germany
- Died: 16 July 1975 (aged 53); Stolberg, West Germany
- Military career
- Allegiance: Nazi Germany
- Branch: Luftwaffe
- Service years: 1939–1945
- Rank: Oberleutnant (first lieutenant)
- Unit: JG 52
- Commands: 3./JG 52
- Conflicts: World War II: Eastern Front
- Awards: Knight's Cross of the Iron Cross

Anton Resch (26 November 1921 – 16 July 1975) was a former Luftwaffe fighter ace and recipient of the Knight's Cross of the Iron Cross during World War II. The Knight's Cross of the Iron Cross, and its variants were the highest awards in the military and paramilitary forces of Nazi Germany during World War II. Resch was credited with 91 victories, becoming an "ace-in-a-day" on three separate occasions.

== Early life and career ==
Resch was born 26 November 1921 in Stolberg, at the time in the Rhine Province the westernmost province of the Free State of Prussia, which at the time was in the British occupied territory of the Rhineland. In mid-1943, Resch who had previously served as transport aviator, was posted to 3. Staffel (3rd squadron) of Jagdgeschwader 52 (JG 52—52nd Fighter Wing). This Staffel was part of I. Gruppe (1st group) of JG 52 headed by Hauptmann Helmut Bennemann and then by Major Johannes Wiese.

=== World War II ===
World War II in Europe had begun on Friday 1 September 1939 when German forces invaded Poland. Germany had launched Operation Barbarossa, the invasion of the Soviet Union on 22 June 1941. On 11 October 1943, I. Gruppe of JG 52 moved to an airfield at Nove Zaporizhzhya located approximately 15 kilometers (9.3 miles) west of Zaporizhzhia on the western bank of the Dnieper of the Eastern Front. The Gruppe supported the 1st Panzer Army fighting in the Battle of the Dnieper on the Eastern Front. Resch claimed his first aerial victory on 21 October over an Ilyushin Il-2 ground-attack aircraft. That day the Gruppe operated over the left wing of the 1st Panzer Army up to Dnipropetrovsk and on the right wing to Bolschoj Tokmak. While based at Nove Zaporizhzhya, Resch claimed four further aerial victories, making him a flying ace. On 23 October, he claimed two Yakovlev Yak-1 fighters, the next day an Il-2 ground-attack aircraft and a Douglas A-20 Havoc, also referred to as a Boston, on 27 October.

I./JG 52 insignia

On 27 January 1944, Resch and his wingman Leutnant Franz Schall flew a combat air patrol in the area of Kerch. On this mission, they engaged in aerial combat with six Bell P-39 Airacobra fighters and Resch was shot down in his Messerschmitt Bf 109 G-6 (Werknummer 20581—factory number). Severely wounded, he did not return until May 1944. At the time of his return to combat, I. Gruppe at the time was based at Leipzig, present-day Serpneve. Resch claimed two P-39s from 16th Guards Fighter Aviation Regiment (16 GvIAP—Gvardeyskiy Istrebitelny Aviatsionny Polk) on 31 May. On 22 June, Soviet forces launched Operation Bagration, attacking Army Group Centre in Byelorussia, with the objective of encircling and destroying its main component armies. On 24 June, the Gruppe transferred to Galați and again to Poloniczna, a makeshift airfield located approximately 50 kilometers (31 miles) northeast of Lemberg, now Lviv.

The Gruppe reached Grabowiec in eastern Poland on 27 July and Kraków on 1 August. On 12 August they were again relocated and moved to Mzurowa. Here on 26 August, Resch became an "ace-in-a-day" for the second time when he claimed seven aerial victories, taking his total to 44. On 31 August, he again claimed seven aerial victories, his third "ace-in-a-day" achievement. On 10 September 1944, he was again wounded when he was shot down in his Bf 109 G-6 (Werknummer 166490) by anti-aircraft artillery 20 kilometers (12 miles) west of Altsohl, present-day Zvolen. At the time, Resch was credited with 63 aerial victories, making him the fourth most successful active fighter pilot of I. Gruppe.

=== With the headquarters unit of JG 52 ===
In late 1944, Resch and Oberleutnant Heinrich Füllgrabe were transferred to the Geschwaderstab (headquarters unit) of JG 52. The request was made by Oberst Hermann Graf who had been appointed Geschwaderkommodore (wing commander) of JG 52 in September 1944. At the time, the Geschwaderstab was based at Krakau, present-day Kraków. Here on 1 January 1945, Resch was awarded the German Cross in Gold (Deutsches Kreuz in Gold). On 6 February 1945, the Geschwaderstab moved to an airfield at Weidengut, present-day Wierzbie. Here Resch claimed four aircraft of unknown type taking his total to 72. On 7 April, Resch was awarded the Knight's Cross of the Iron Cross (Ritterkreuz des Eisernen Kreuzes) for 91 aerial victories.

On 1 May, the Geschwaderstab deployed to Deutsch Brod, present-day Havlíčkův Brod, approximately halfway between Brno and Prague, where they were united with I. and III. Gruppe. Resch and other soldiers of JG 52 surrendered to the 90th US Infantry Division near Písek on 8 May 1945 and became a prisoner of war (POW). The soldiers were initially interned at a POW camp at Strakonice. On 16 May, Resch and most of the JG 52 personnel were handed over by the American forces to the Soviet Union.

== Later life ==
Resch was released from Soviet captivity in the mid-1950s. Returning to West Germany, Resch died on 16 July 1975 at the age of 53 in his hometown Stolberg.

== Summary of career ==
=== Aerial victory claims ===
According to US historian David T. Zabecki, Resch was credited with 91 aerial victories. Spick also lists him with 91 aerial victories claimed in 210 combat missions and a mission-to-claim ratio of 2.31. Mathews and Foreman, authors of Luftwaffe Aces — Biographies and Victory Claims, researched the German Federal Archives and also state that he was credited with 91 aerial victories, all of which claimed on the Eastern Front.

Victory claims were logged to a map-reference (PQ = Planquadrat), for example "PQ 34 Ost 58739". The Luftwaffe grid map (Jägermeldenetz) covered all of Europe, western Russia and North Africa and was composed of rectangles measuring 15 minutes of latitude by 30 minutes of longitude, an area of about 360 square miles (930 km^{2}). These sectors were then subdivided into 36 smaller units to give a location area 3 km × 4 km (1.9 mi × 2.5 mi) in size.

Chronicle of aerial victories
This and the ♠ (Ace of spades) indicates those aerial victories which made Resch an "ace-in-a-day", a term which designates a fighter pilot who has shot down five or more airplanes in a single day. This and the ? (question mark) indicates information discrepancies listed by Barbas, Prien, Stemmer, Rodeike, Balke, Bock, Mathews and Foreman.
| Claim | Date | Time | Type | Location | Claim | Date | Time | Type | Location |
– 3. Staffel of Jagdgeschwader 52 – Eastern Front — October – 31 December 1943
| 1 | 21 October 1943 | 12:08 | Il-2 m.H. (Note: The "m.H." refers to an Ilyushin Il-2 with rear gunner (mit Heckschütze).) | PQ 34 Ost 58739; 20 km (12 mi) west of Bolschoj Tokmak | 6 | 28 October 1943 | 07:43 | P-39 | PQ 34 Ost 47161; 25 km (16 mi) north-northwest of Ivanovka |
| 2 | 23 October 1943 | 07:19 | Yak-1 | PQ 34 Ost 58382; 25 km (16 mi) south of Zaporozhye | 7 | 9 November 1943 | 11:15 | U-2 | PQ 34 Ost 47771 south of Gromovka |
| 3 | 23 October 1943 | 07:24 | Yak-1 | PQ 34 Ost 58564, south of Kalinowka vicinity of Kaltinowka | 8 | 9 November 1943 | 11:17 | U-2 | PQ 34 Ost 47771 south of Gromovka |
| 4 | 24 October 1943 | 10:25 | Il-2 m.H. | PQ 34 Ost 57182; 10 km (6.2 mi) southwest of Melitopol | 9 | 29 November 1943 | 12:17 | Il-2 m.H. | PQ 34 Ost 2929 |
| 5 | 27 October 1943 | 10:35 | Boston | PQ 34 Ost 57346; 30 km (19 mi) southwest of Melitopol | 10 | 29 November 1943 | 12:45 | P-39 | PQ 34 Ost 39181; 15 km (9.3 mi) northeast of Alexandrija |
– 3. Staffel of Jagdgeschwader 52 – Eastern Front — 1 January – 10 September 1944
| 11 | 26 January 1944 | 07:54? (Note: According to Mathews and Foreman claimed at 07:53.) | Il-2 m.H. | PQ 34 Ost 66563 vicinity of Grammatikowo | 38♠ | 26 August 1944 | 11:05 | Yak-9 | PQ 25 Ost 11285; 10 km (6.2 mi) north of Sandomierz |
| 12 | 31 May 1944 | 11:25 | P-39 | PQ 24 Ost 78642; 10 km (6.2 mi) south of Tudora | 39♠ | 26 August 1944 | 11:14 | Pe-2 | PQ 25 Ost 11418; 15 km (9.3 mi) west of Sandomierz |
| 13 | 31 May 1944 | 11:36 | P-39 | PQ 24 Ost 78474; 10 km (6.2 mi) north of Tudora | 40♠ | 26 August 1944 | 13:05 | P-39 | PQ 25 Ost 11276; 15 km (9.3 mi) east-southeast of Opatów |
| 14 | 1 June 1944 | 11:40 | Il-2 m.H. | PQ 24 Ost 78543; 45 km (28 mi) west-northwest of Iași | 41♠ | 26 August 1944 | 13:10 | P-39 | PQ 25 Ost 11285; 10 km (6.2 mi) north of Sandomierz |
| 15 | 4 June 1944 | 15:55 | P-39 | PQ 24 Ost 78568; 15 km (9.3 mi) southwest of Tudora | 42♠ | 26 August 1944 | 13:25 | Il-2 | PQ 25 Ost 11196 vicinity of Opatów |
| 16 | 26 June 1944 | 15:15 | La-5 | PQ 25 Ost 50733; 10 km (6.2 mi) south of Borystow | 43♠ | 26 August 1944 | 17:13 | Il-2 | PQ 25 Ost 11323; 15 km (9.3 mi) south-southwest of Opatów |
| 17 | 14 July 1944 | 10:27 | P-39 | PQ 25 Ost 41626; 55 km (34 mi) southwest of Lutsk | 44♠ | 26 August 1944 | 17:16 | Il-2 | PQ 25 Ost 11356; 20 km (12 mi) south-southwest of Opatów |
| 18 | 16 July 1944 | 15:36 | Yak-9 | PQ 25 Ost 41683; 30 km (19 mi) northwest of Brody | 45 | 27 August 1944 | 12:17 | P-39 | PQ 25 Ost 11249; 15 km (9.3 mi) northeast of Opatów |
| 19 | 20 July 1944 | 13:19 | Yak-9 | PQ 25 Ost 40113; 15 km (9.3 mi) north of Lviv | 46 | 27 August 1944 | 12:23 | Il-2 m.H. | PQ 25 Ost 11367; 20 km (12 mi) south of Opatów |
| 20 | 22 July 1944 | 17:30 | Yak-9 | PQ 25 Ost 40392; 40 km (25 mi) west-northwest of Berezhany | 47 | 27 August 1944 | 12:24 | Il-2 m.H. | PQ 25 Ost 11367; 20 km (12 mi) south of Opatów |
| 21 | 22 July 1944 | 17:35? (Note: According to Mathews and Foreman claimed at 17:33.) | Pe-2 | PQ 25 Ost 40444; 25 km (16 mi) southwest of Zolochiv | 48 | 27 August 1944 | 15:23 | Il-2 m.H. | PQ 25 Ost 11321; 15 km (9.3 mi) south-southwest of Opatów |
| 22 | 23 July 1944 | 18:15 | Pe-2 | PQ 25 Ost 40351; 25 km (16 mi) southeast of Lviv | 49 | 28 August 1944 | 12:29 | Il-2 m.H. | PQ 25 Ost 11323; 15 km (9.3 mi) south-southwest of Opatów |
| 23 | 24 July 1944 | 18:36 | Pe-2 | PQ 25 Ost 30637; 20 km (12 mi) north of Stryi | 50 | 28 August 1944 | 12:31 | Il-2 m.H. | PQ 25 Ost 11332; 15 km (9.3 mi) south of Opatów |
| 24 | 4 August 1944 | 14:54 | P-39 | PQ 25 Ost 11594 vicinity of Mielec | 51 | 28 August 1944 | 12:35 | P-39 | PQ 25 Ost 11321; 15 km (9.3 mi) south-southwest of Opatów |
| 25 | 4 August 1944 | 14:55 | P-39 | PQ 25 Ost 11594 vicinity of Mielec | 52♠ | 31 August 1944 | 12:55 | Yak-9 | PQ 25 Ost 11184; 10 km (6.2 mi) west of Opatów |
| 26 | 12 August 1944 | 13:53 | Yak-11 | PQ 25 Ost 11385; 25 km (16 mi) north-northwest of Mielic | 53♠ | 31 August 1944 | 14:13 | Il-2 m.H. | PQ 25 Ost 11158; 10 km (6.2 mi) northwest of Opatów |
| 27 | 12 August 1944 | 14:02 | Yak-11 | PQ 25 Ost 01463 | 54♠ | 31 August 1944 | 14:14 | Il-2 m.H. | PQ 25 Ost 11181; 10 km (6.2 mi) west of Opatów |
| 28 | 12 August 1944 | 17:00 | La-5 | PQ 25 Ost 11442; 30 km (19 mi) southwest of Opatów | 55♠ | 31 August 1944 | 14:21 | P-39 | PQ 25 Ost 11148; 20 km (12 mi) west-northwest of Opatów |
| 29 | 23 August 1944 | 18:51 | Il-2 | PQ 25 Ost 11423 vicinity of Sandomierz | 56♠ | 31 August 1944 | 16:04 | Il-2 m.H. | PQ 25 Ost 11185; 10 km (6.2 mi) west of Opatów |
| 30 | 24 August 1944 | 11:10 | Il-2 m.H. | PQ 25 Ost 11442; 15 km (9.3 mi) southwest of Sandomierz | 57♠ | 31 August 1944 | Il-2 m.H. | Il-2 | PQ 25 Ost 11197 vicinity of Opatów |
| 31 | 24 August 1944 | 14:26 | Il-2 m.H. | PQ 25 Ost 11753; 20 km (12 mi) south-southwest of Mielec | 58♠ | 31 August 1944 | 16:08 | Il-2 m.H. | PQ 25 Ost 11323; 10 km (6.2 mi) west of Opatów |
| 32 | 24 August 1944 | 14:28 | Il-2 m.H. | PQ 25 Ost 11723; 15 km (9.3 mi) southwest of Mielec | 59 | 1 September 1944 | 10:02 | Il-2 m.H. | PQ 25 Ost 11413; 15 km (9.3 mi) west of Sandomierz |
| 33♠ | 25 August 1944 | 09:11 | Il-2 m.H. | PQ 25 Ost 11335; 15 km (9.3 mi) south of Opatów | 60 | 1 September 1944 | 10:05 | Il-2 m.H. | PQ 25 Ost 11416; 15 km (9.3 mi) west of Sandomierz |
| 34♠ | 25 August 1944 | 09:11 | Yak-9 | PQ 25 Ost 11335; 15 km (9.3 mi) south of Opatów | 61 | 2 September 1944 | 09:59 | P-39 | PQ 25 Ost 11182; 10 km (6.2 mi) west of Opatów |
| 35♠ | 25 August 1944 | 16:08 | Yak-9 | PQ 25 Ost 11388; 25 km (16 mi) north-northwest of Mielec | 62 | 2 September 1944 | 10:01 | Il-2 m.H. | PQ 25 Ost 11185; 10 km (6.2 mi) west of Opatów |
| 36♠ | 25 August 1944 | 16:10 | U-2 | PQ 25 Ost 11521; 20 km (12 mi) north-northwest of Mielec | 63 | 2 September 1944 | 10:04 | Il-2 m.H. | PQ 25 Ost 11322; 15 km (9.3 mi) south-southwest of Opatów |
| 37♠ | 25 August 1944 | 16:18 | Il-2 m.H. | PQ 25 Ost 11514; 25 km (16 mi) northwest of Mielec | | | | | |
– Stab of Jagdgeschwader 52 – Eastern Front — 1 January – 8 May 1945
| 69 | 20 February 1945 | — | unknown | | 71 | 20 February 1945 | — | unknown | |
| 70 | 20 February 1945 | — | unknown | | 72 | 20 February 1945 | — | unknown | |
According to Barbas, his aerial victories 73 through 75 were not documented. Mathews and Foreman list the four aerial victories claimed on 20 February 1945 without a specific number.
| 76? (Note: This claim is not listed by Barbas. According to Mathews and Foreman this claim is listed as his 76th aerial victory.) | 5 March 1945 | — | Yak-9 | | 79 | 6 March 1945 | — | Yak-9 | PQ 71192 |
| 77 | 6 March 1945 | — | Yak-9 | PQ 71193 | 80 | 11 March 1945 | 12:02 | Il-2 | east of Jauer |
| 78 | 6 March 1945 | — | Pe-2 | PQ 71198 | 81 | 11 March 1945 | 12:06 | Il-2 | east of Jauer |
According to Barbas, Mathews and Foreman, his aerial victories 82 through 84 were not documented.
| 85 | 23 March 1945 | — | Yak-9 | PQ 71614 | 89 | 25 March 1945 | — | unknown | |
| 86 | 24 March 1945 | — | Il-2 | PQ 71166 | 90 | 25 March 1945 | — | unknown | |
| 87 | 24 March 1945 | — | La-5 | PQ 71172 | 91? (Note: This claim is not listed by Barbas. According to Mathews and Foreman, Resch claimed four aerial victories on 25 March 1945.) | 25 March 1945 | — | unknown | |
| 88 | 25 March 1945 | — | unknown | | | | | | |

=== Awards ===
- Iron Cross (1939) 2nd and 1st Class
- German Cross in Gold on 1 January 1945 as Leutnant in the 3./Jagdgeschwader 52
- Knight's Cross of the Iron Cross on 7 April 1945 as Oberleutnant and Staffelkapitän of the 3./Jagdgeschwader 52
