= Lysogorskaya =

Lysogorskaya Лысогорская
- Stanitsa
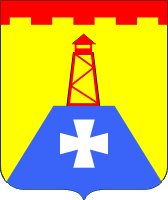
- Coat of arms
- Interactive map of Lysogorskaya
- Location of Lysogorskaya Lysogorskaya (Stavropol Krai)
- Coordinates: 44°07′N 43°18′E
- Country: Russia
- Federal subject: Stavropol Krai
- Administrative district: Georgiyevsky District
- Founded: 1821

Population (2010 Census)
  - Total: 11,174
  - Estimate (2023): 11,200 (+0.2%)
- Time zone: UTC+3 (MSK)
- Postal code: 357838
- OKTMO ID: 07615410101

Lysogorskaya (Russian: Лысого́рская) is a rural locality (a stanitsa) in Georgiyevsky District of Stavropol Krai, Russia. Population: 11,174 (2010 census); 10,039 (2002 census).
