= Nizhny Chir =

Nizhny Chir Нижний Чир
- Stanitsa
- Location within Volgograd Oblast Location within Russia
- Coordinates: 48°21′N 43°05′E
- Country: Russia
- Region: Volgograd Oblast
- District: Surovikinsky District
- Time zone: UTC+4:00

Nizhny Chir (Russian: Нижний Чир) is a rural locality (a stanitsa) and the administrative center of Nizhnechirskoye Rural Settlement, Surovikinsky District, Volgograd Oblast, Russia. The population was 4,038 as of 2010. There are 66 streets.

== Geography ==
Nizhny Chir is located on the right bank of the Chir River, 46 km southeast of Surovikino (the district's administrative centre) by road. Blizhnepodgorsky is the nearest rural locality.
