= Rohan, Kharkiv Oblast =

Rural settlement in eastern Ukraine

Rohan Рогань
- Rural settlement
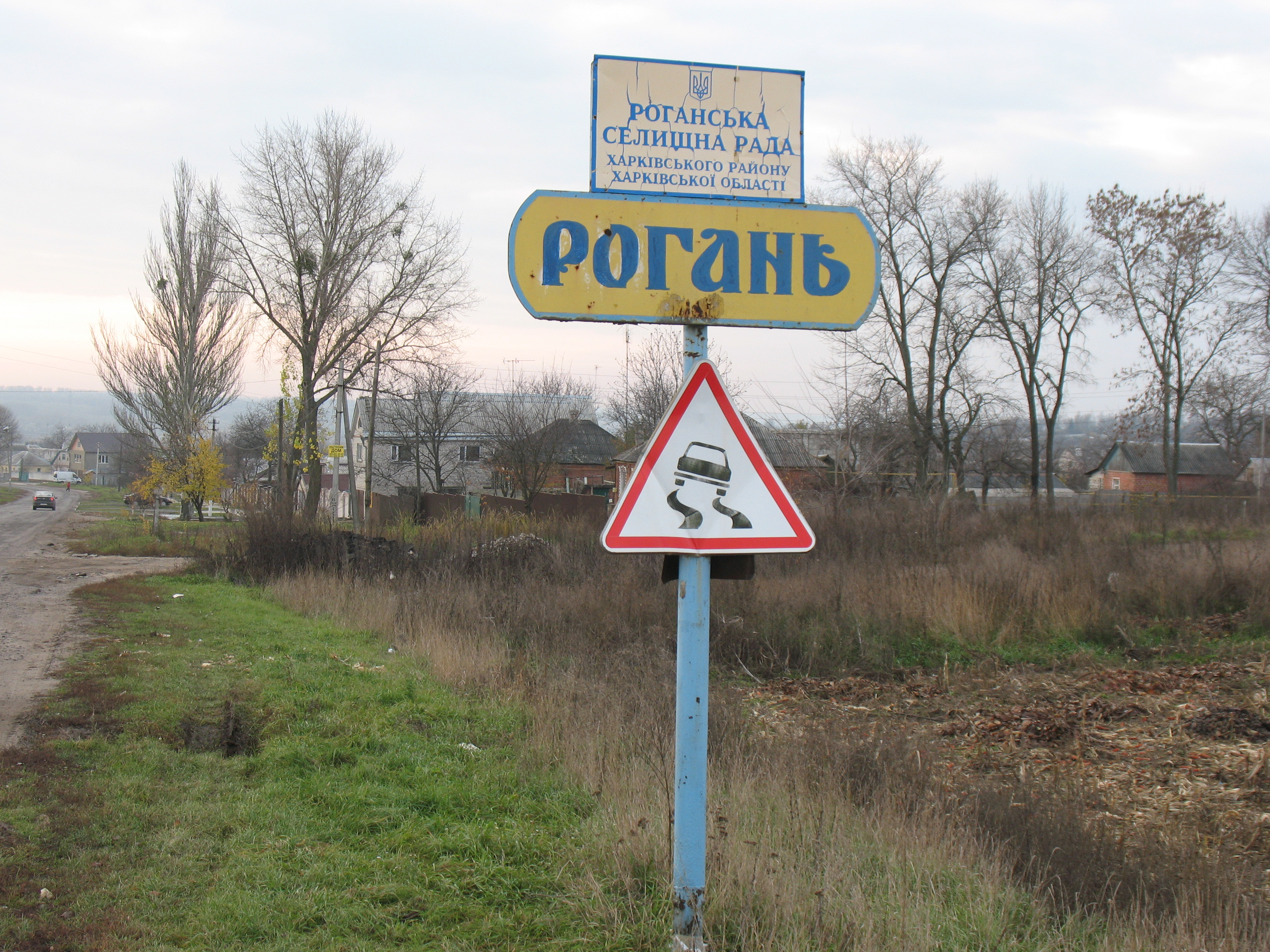

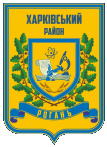
- Coat of arms

- Location within Kharkiv Oblast Location within Ukraine
- Coordinates: 49°54′14″N 36°29′11″E
- Country: Ukraine
- Oblast: Kharkiv Oblast
- Raion: Kharkiv Raion

Population (2022)
  - Total: 3,262
- Demonym: Rohanska (Ukrainian: Роганська)
- Postal code: 62481

Rohan (Ukrainian: Рогань) is a rural settlement located in Kharkiv Raion, Kharkiv Oblast (province) of eastern Ukraine near the oblast's capital of Kharkiv. Rohan hosts the administration of Rohan settlement hromada, one of the hromadas of Ukraine. Its population is 3,262 (2022 estimate).

A railway station is located near the settlement.

== History ==
It was founded in 1736. In January 1989 the population was 5305 people.

In January 2013 the population was 5045 people.

Until 26 January 2024, Rohan was designated as an urban-type settlement. On this day, a new law entered into force which abolished this status, and Rohan became a rural settlement.
