= CSOR =

Csor may refer to:

- Canadian Special Operations Regiment
- Connecticut Southern Railroad
- Csór, a village in Fejér county, Hungary
