= Heinrich Sturm =

German World War II fighter pilot

- Born: 12 June 1920; Dieburg, Hesse
- Died: 22 December 1944 (aged 24); Csór, Hungary
- Military career
- Allegiance: Nazi Germany
- Branch: Luftwaffe
- Rank: Hauptmann (captain)
- Commands: 4./JG 52, 5./JG 52
- Conflicts: World War II
- Awards: Knight's Cross of the Iron Cross

Heinrich Sturm (12 June 1920 – 22 December 1944) was a German Luftwaffe military aviator during World War II, a fighter ace credited with 158 enemy aircraft shot down in an unknown number of combat missions. All of his aerial victories were claimed over the Eastern Front. He was "ace-in-a-day" four times, shooting down five or more aircraft on a single day.

Born in Dieburg, Sturm joined the military service in the Luftwaffe of Nazi Germany and was trained as a fighter pilot. He was then posted to Jagdgeschwader 52 (JG 52—52nd Fighter Wing) in the summer 1941. JG 52 was based on the central sector of the Eastern Front, where he claimed his first aerial victory on 16 October 1941. In September 1943, he was appointed Staffelkapitän (squadron leader) of the 4. Staffel (4th squadron) of JG 52. Sturm was awarded the Knight's Cross of the Iron Cross on 26 March 1944 and severely wounded by bomb shrapnel on 16 April. Following his convalescence, he returned to JG 52, taking command of 5. Staffel. Sturm was killed in a takeoff accident on 22 December 1944 in Csór, Hungary.

== Career ==
Sturm was born on 12 June 1920 in Dieburg in the Province of Hesse-Nassau as part of the Weimar Republic. Following fighter pilot training, (Note: Flight training in the Luftwaffe progressed through the levels A1, A2 and B1, B2, referred to as A/B flight training. A training included theoretical and practical training in aerobatics, navigation, long-distance flights and dead-stick landings. The B courses included high-altitude flights, instrument flights, night landings and training to handle the aircraft in difficult situations.) he was posted to 6. Staffel (6th squadron) of Jagdgeschwader 52 (JG 52—52nd fighter wing) with the rank of Feldwebel (Sergeant) in the summer of 1941. At the time, JG 52 was based on the Eastern Front, supporting Operation Barbarossa, the German invasion of the Soviet Union. His commanding officer in 6. Staffel was Oberleutnant Rudolf Resch, a squadron subordinated to II. Gruppe (2nd group) of JG 52 headed by Hauptmann Erich Woitke.

On 2 October, German forces launched Operation Typhoon, the failed strategic offensive to capture Moscow. In support of this offensive, the Gruppe had moved to an airfield west of Kalinin, present-day Tver, on 16 October. Two days later, Sturm claimed his first three aerial victories when he shot down a Petlyakov Pe-2 bomber. Sturm then returned to Germany, where he served as an instructor at a fighter pilot school and attended the Kriegsschule.

=== Eastern Front ===
Following his return to the Eastern Front, he was assigned to the Gruppenstab (headquarters unit) II. Gruppe of JG 52. On 1 January 1943, he was promoted to Leutnant (second lieutenant). Sturm claimed his first aerial victory with the Gruppenstab, and tenth in total, on 13 February when he shot down a Lavochkin-Gorbunov-Gudkov LaGG-3 fighter south of Novorossiysk. At the time, II. Gruppe was based at Slavyansk-na-Kubani and fighting over the Kuban bridgehead following the German defeat in the Battle of Stalingrad. The commanding officer of II. Gruppe was Hauptmann Johannes Steinhoff. On 13 March, the Gruppe moved to an airfield at Anapa where it remained until 5 July. On 24 March, Steinhoff left the Gruppe and was replaced by Hauptmann Helmut Kühle.

Sturm claimed three LaGG-3 fighters shot down on 15 April near Abinskaya, taking his total to 22 aerial victories. Five days later he became an "ace-in-a-day" for the first time, bringing his total to 30. That day, he shot down a Lavochkin La-5 fighter on mission before noon, and three Ilyushin Il-2 ground attack aircraft and a further La-5 fighter near Gelendzhik in the afternoon. He reached his 40th aerial victory on 6 June when he shot down two La-5 fighters. On 23 July, Sturm was awarded the German Cross in Gold (Deutsches Kreuz in Gold).

=== Squadron leader and death ===
II./JG 52 insignia

On 1 August 1943, Sturm was appointed acting Staffelkapitän (squadron leader) of 4. Staffel (4th squadron) of JG 52. He replaced Leutnant Helmut Lipfert in this capacity who was transferred to the 6. Staffel (4th squadron) of JG 52. Sturm later officially became the Staffelkapitän of 4. Staffel on 1 September, succeeding Hauptmann Gerhard Barkhorn who was given command of II. Gruppe. That day, the Gruppe moved to an airfield at Karlivka where they fought in the aftermath of the Belgorod–Kharkov offensive operation, also referred to as the fourth Battle of Kharkov. Here, Sturm claimed his first aerial victory as Staffelkapitän when he shot down a La-5 fighter. In November, the Red Army launched the Kerch–Eltigen operation leading to the Crimean offensive in early 1944. On 2 November, II. Gruppe was moved to Baherove where elements of the Gruppe remained until 19 March 1944. On 5 November, Sturm again became an "ace-in-a-day" when he shot down an Il-2 ground attack aircraft and five Yakovlev Yak-1 fighters over the Soviet bridge heads. The following day, he claimed six further victories, five Yak-1 fighters and a Bell P-39 Airacobra, making him yet again an "ace-in-a-day".

On 13 December, Sturm claimed his last aerial victory of 1943 when he shot down a Curtiss P-40 Warhawk fighter east of Eltingen, present-day part of Kerch. On 28 February 1944, 4. and 5. Staffel was ordered to Grammatikowo located near Sovietskyi. Sturm was awarded the Knight's Cross of the Iron Cross (Ritterkreuz des Eisernen Kreuzes) on 26 March 1944. On 8 April, Sturm claimed eight aerial victories, including 100th in total, his last "ace-in-a-day" achievement. He was the 66th Luftwaffe pilot to achieve the century mark. A few weeks later on 16 April, he was wounded badly by bomb debris in an attack on the airfield at Chersonesus at Sevastopol on the Crimea. In consequence, command of 4. Staffel was passed on to Leutnant Hans Waldmann.

In August 1944, he returned to JG 52 and took over command of 5. Staffel (5th squadron) on 1 September. He replaced Otto Fönnekold, who was killed in action on 31 August. On 22 December 1944, he claimed his last two aerial victories. Taking off for another sortie from Csór that day, one of his Bf 109 G-6/U4 (Werknummer 442036—factory number) aircraft's landing gear struts hit a truck, killing him in the accident. The following day, command of 5. Staffel was given to Leutnant Peter Düttmann.

== Summary of career ==
=== Aerial victory claims ===
According to US historian David T. Zabecki, Sturm was credited with 158 aerial victories. Spick lists Sturm with 157 aerial victories claimed in an unknown number of combat missions, all of them on the Eastern Front. Mathews and Foreman, authors of Luftwaffe Aces — Biographies and Victory Claims, researched the German Federal Archives and state that he is attributed with 158 aerial victories, all of which claimed on the Eastern Front. The archives revealed records for 123 of these claims. However, there are 52 additional claims attributed to II. Gruppe of JG 52 in the timeframe November to December 1944 that have no names associated to them. The authors assume that many of these claims belong to Sturm. According to Prien, Stemmer, Balke, and Bock, it is currently impossible to verify the exact number of aerial victories claimed by Sturm. According to the authors, the number could be closer to 124. The authors Daniel and Gabor Horvath compared Soviet enemy loss reports to Sturm's claims over Hungary. In the timeframe 18 October to 22 December 1944, Sturm claimed 13 aerial victories, while the authors found eight matching Soviet losses, a corroboration of 62%.

Victory claims were logged to a map-reference (PQ = Planquadrat), for example "PQ 19424". The Luftwaffe grid map (Jägermeldenetz) covered all of Europe, western Russia and North Africa and was composed of rectangles measuring 15 minutes of latitude by 30 minutes of longitude, an area of about 360 square miles (930 km^{2}). These sectors were then subdivided into 36 smaller units to give a location area 3 km × 4 km (1.9 mi × 2.5 mi) in size.

Chronicle of aerial victories
This and the ♠ (Ace of spades) indicates those aerial victories which made Sturm an "ace-in-a-day", a term which designates a fighter pilot who has shot down five or more airplanes in a single day. This and the ? (question mark) indicates information discrepancies listed by Barbas, Prien, Stemmer, Rodeike, Bock, Mathews and Foreman.
Claim	Date	Time	Type	Location	Claim	Date	Time	Type	Location
– 6. Staffel of Jagdgeschwader 52 – Operation Barbarossa — June – December 1941
1	18 October 1941	13:27	Pe-2						
– 6. Staffel of Jagdgeschwader 52 – Eastern Front — 7 May 1942 – 3 February 1943
2	28 May 1942	18:35	Il-2		6	8 December 1942	08:21	Boston	PQ 19424
3	30 June 1942	09:22	LaGG-3		7	8 December 1942	17:15? (Note: According to Mathews and Foreman claimed at 13:15.)	Il-2	PQ 29652
4	28 August 1942	I-180 (Yak-7)	11:12	PQ 49172; 10 km (6.2 mi) east of Pitomnik	8	17 December 1942	07:47	LaGG-3	PQ 49772; 10 km (6.2 mi) east of Aksay
5	30 October 1942	09:23	Yak-1	PQ 95823; 25 km (16 mi) northeast of Lazarevskoye	9	17 December 1942	13:20? (Note: According to Mathews and Foreman claimed at 13:30.)	Il-2	PQ 3976
– Stab II. Gruppe of Jagdgeschwader 52 – Eastern Front — 4 February – 1 August 1943
10	13 February 1943	15:17	LaGG-3	5 km (3.1 mi) south of Novorossiysk	26♠	20 April 1943	11:10	La-5	PQ 34 Ost 75461, 1 km (0.62 mi) south of Datscho southwest of Kabardinka
11	23 February 1943	06:38	LaGG-3	PQ 34 Ost 75211 southeast of Gostagajewskaja	27♠	20 April 1943	16:10	LaGG-3? (Note: According to Mathews and Foreman claimed as Ilyushin Il-2 mit Heckschütze, with rear gunner.)	PQ 34 Ost 75462; Black Sea, 10 km (6.2 mi) west of Gelendzhik
12	23 February 1943	06:42	LaGG-3	PQ 34 Ost 7525	28♠	20 April 1943	16:13	Il-2 m.H. (Note: The "m.H." refers to an Ilyushin Il-2 with rear gunner (mit Heckschütze).)	PQ 34 Ost 75464, 6 km (3.7 mi) west of Gelendzhik; Black Sea, 5 km (3.1 mi) south of Kabardinka
13	5 March 1943	09:17	Yak-1	PQ 34 Ost 8656, Flamanskaja	29♠	20 April 1943	16:14	Il-2 m.H.	PQ 34 Ost 85371 vicinity of Gelendzhik
14	5 March 1943	09:21	Yak-1	PQ 34 Ost 8662	30♠	20 April 1943	16:19? (Note: According to Mathews and Foreman claimed at 16:17.)	La-5	PQ 34 Ost 75462, over of Kabardinka
15	10 March 1943	14:10	LaGG-3	PQ 34 Ost 8515; 20 km (12 mi) north of Novocherkassk	31	21 April 1943	11:02	MiG-3	PQ 34 Ost 75462
16	10 March 1943	14:15	LaGG-3	PQ 34 Ost 8516; 20 km (12 mi) north of Novocherkassk	32	21 April 1943	11:20	MiG-3	PQ 34 Ost 75464; Black Sea, 5 km (3.1 mi) south of Kabardinka
17	12 March 1943	11:25	U-2	PQ 34 Ost 85234 vicinity of Cholmskaja	33	23 April 1943	07:20	Pe-2	PQ 34 Ost 85561; Black Sea, south of Gelendzhik
18	22 March 1943	13:45	P-39	PQ 34 Ost 86393 south of Nowo-Nikplajewskaja	34	9 May 1943	16:28	Yak-1	PQ 34 Ost 75264, 6 km (3.7 mi) south of Krymskaja east of Nowo-Bakanskoja
19	22 March 1943	13:55	P-39	PQ 34 Ost 86454 south of Dneprowskaja	35	30 May 1943	07:46	Il-2 m.H.	PQ 34 Ost 75352; Black Sea, south of Anapa
20	15 April 1943	12:05	LaGG-3	PQ 34 Ost 85142, 3 km (1.9 mi) northwest of Abinskaya southeast of Krymsk	36	31 May 1943	17:39	Yak-1	PQ 34 Ost 76894, east of Kijewskoje
21	15 April 1943	15:17	LaGG-3	PQ 34 Ost 85181 northeast of Usun	37	3 June 1943	17:47	P-39	PQ 34 Ost 76893, 8 km (5.0 mi) southeast of Kijewskoje south of Bakanskij
22	15 April 1943	15:20? (Note: According to Mathews and Foreman claimed at 15:15.)	LaGG-3	PQ 34 Ost 85184 southeast of Tscherkassowski	38	3 June 1943	18:09? (Note: According to Mathews and Foreman claimed at 18:06.)	La-5	PQ 34 Ost 76773, southwestern edge of Kijewskoje northeast of Krymsk
23	16 April 1943	16:13	P-39	PQ 34 Ost 85273 vicinity of Dneprowskaja	39	3 June 1943	18:11	La-5	PQ 34 Ost 75232, 6 km (3.7 mi) southeast of Kijewskoje north of Krymsk
24	17 April 1943	11:05	LaGG-3	PQ 34 Ost 86452; 8 km (5.0 mi) south of Novorossiysk	40	6 June 1943	07:36	La-5	PQ 34 Ost 76894, east of Kijewskoje
25	17 April 1943	11:10	LaGG-3	PQ 34 Ost 85371, 3 km (1.9 mi) southwest of Gelendzhik	41	6 June 1943	07:37	Il-2 m.H. ? (Note: According to Barbas claimed as Lavochkin La-5.)	PQ 34 Ost 76894, east of Kijewskoje
– 4. Staffel of Jagdgeschwader 52 – Eastern Front — September – 31 December 1943
42? (Note: This claim is not listed by Barbas.)	1 September 1943	13:32	Yak-1	PQ 35 Ost 41812; 25 km (16 mi) north of Busk	63♠	5 November 1943	07:22	Yak-1	PQ 34 Ost 66731, south of Eltigen
43	1 September 1943	16:36	La-5	PQ 35 Ost 60322; 15 km (9.3 mi) southeast of Merefa	64♠	5 November 1943	07:30	Yak-1	PQ 34 Ost 66732 vicinity of Tobetschik
44	5 September 1943	08:01	Yak-1	PQ 35 Ost 51874; 15 km (9.3 mi) south of Bohodukhiv	65♠	5 November 1943	11:47	Yak-1	PQ 34 Ost 66671, east of Kerch
45	5 September 1943	08:02	Yak-1	PQ 35 Ost 51873; 15 km (9.3 mi) south of Bohodukhiv	66♠	5 November 1943	12:07	Yak-1	PQ 34 Ost 66672 east of Kerch
46	6 September 1943	06:20	La-5	PQ 35 Ost 41483; 30 km (19 mi) south-westsouth of Lebedin	67♠	5 November 1943	15:00	Yak-1	PQ 34 Ost 66641, northwest of Bakssy east of Bulganak
47	6 September 1943	15:20	LaGG-3	PQ 35 Ost 60184; 15 km (9.3 mi) east of Merefa	68♠	6 November 1943	07:35	Yak-1	PQ 34 Ost 66564 vicinity of Kerch
48	7 September 1943	05:45	Yak-1	PQ 35 Ost 60334; 25 km (16 mi) east of Taranovka	69♠	6 November 1943	07:45	P-39	PQ 34 Ost 66732, east of Eltigen vicinity of Tobetschik
49	2 October 1943	17:07	P-39	PQ 34 Ost 58683; 5 km (3.1 mi) north of Bolschoj Tokmak	70♠	6 November 1943	11:05	Yak-1	PQ 34 Ost 66841; Kerch Strait, southwest of Tamanj
50	13 October 1943	15:41	Yak-1	PQ 35 Ost 10154; 20 km (12 mi) south of Pereiaslav-Khmelnytskyi	71♠	6 November 1943	11:45	Yak-1	PQ 34 Ost 66813; Kerch Strait, vicinity of Kap Tusla
51	13 October 1943	15:42	La-5	PQ 35 Ost 10161; 20 km (12 mi) southeast of Pereiaslav-Khmelnytskyi	72♠	6 November 1943	11:47	Yak-1	PQ 34 Ost 66813; Kerch Strait, vicinity of Kap Tusla
52	13 October 1943	15:45	Yak-9	PQ 35 Ost 10133; 15 km (9.3 mi) southeast of Pereiaslav-Khmelnytskyi	73♠	6 November 1943	15:10	Yak-1	PQ 34 Ost 6653
53	15 October 1943	05:49	Yak-1	PQ 35 Ost 10131, 2 km (1.2 mi) south of Traktomirow; 15 km (9.3 mi) southeast of Pereiaslav-Khmelnytskyi	74	30 November 1943	12:03	Yak-1	PQ 34 Ost 66732, east of Eltigen vicinity of Tobetschik
54	15 October 1943	15:17	Yak-1	PQ 35 Ost 10124; 10 km (6.2 mi) south of Pereiaslav-Khmelnytskyi	75	30 November 1943	12:07	Yak-1	PQ 34 Ost 66592 south of Kerch
55	22 October 1943	15:09	Il-2 m.H.	PQ 34 Ost 39321; 10 km (6.2 mi) east of Alexandrija	76	2 December 1943	07:19	Yak-1	PQ 34 Ost 6673, 1 km (0.62 mi) south of Eltigen
56	22 October 1943	15:14	Yak-1	PQ 34 Ost 39324; 10 km (6.2 mi) east of Alexandrija	77	2 December 1943	07:25	Il-2	1 km (0.62 mi) southeast of Tobetschik
57	26 October 1943	07:35	Yak-1	PQ 34 Ost 57142; 20 km (12 mi) west of Melitopol	78	2 December 1943	07:29	Il-2	3 km (1.9 mi) southeast of Ortmaeti
58	29 October 1943	11:07	Yak-1	PQ 34 Ost 47182; 25 km (16 mi) northwest of Ivanovka	79	5 December 1943	07:43	Yak-9	south of Kossa Tusla
59	2 November 1943	13:30	Yak-1	PQ 34 Ost 66813; Kerch Strait, vicinity of Kap Tusla	80	9 December 1943	11:15	Il-2	southeast of Kossa Tusla
60	4 November 1943	09:07	Il-2 m.H.	PQ 34 Ost 66641, northwest of Bakssy east of Bulganak	81	11 December 1943	11:40	P-39	east of Kamysch-Burun
61	4 November 1943	14:17	Yak-1	PQ 34 Ost 6653	82	13 December 1943	09:46	P-40	east of Eltigen
62♠	5 November 1943	07:15	Il-2 m.H.	PQ 34 Ost 66813; Kerch Strait, vicinity of Kap Tusla					
– 4. Staffel of Jagdgeschwader 52 – Eastern Front — 1 January – April 1944
83	12 January 1944	06:55	Boston	Adshim-Uschkai vicinity of Kap Tarchan	95	7 April 1944	17:12? (Note: According to Mathews and Foreman claimed at 14:12.)	Yak-1	PQ 55242
84	12 January 1944	06:57	P-39	PQ 66533 vicinity of Bagerovo	96♠	8 April 1944	11:25	Il-2	PQ 37891; 20 km (12 mi) southeast of Perekop
85	12 January 1944	08:40	P-39	PQ 6563 vicinity of Grammatikowo	97♠	8 April 1944	11:27	Yak-1	vicinity of An-Najman
86	12 January 1944	11:30	P-39	PQ 66561 vicinity of Malyj	98♠	8 April 1944	13:35	Yak-1	PQ 37814; 10 km (6.2 mi) northwest of Perekop
87	7 February 1944	06:18	Yak-1	Cape Khroni	99♠	8 April 1944	13:40	Il-2	vicinity of An-Najman
88? (Note: Barbas attributed this claim to an unknown pilot and not to Sturm.)	8 February 1944	10:08	Yak-9	east of Bulganek	100♠	8 April 1944	15:45	Yak-7	PQ 37894; 20 km (12 mi) southeast of Perekop
89	10 February 1944	15:12? (Note: According to Mathews and Foreman claimed at 15:52.)	Yak-9	vicinity of Bulganek east of Bulganek	101♠	8 April 1944	17:31	P-39	PQ 46114 east of Tomoschewka
90	15 February 1944	06:08	P-39	PQ 66671 east of Kerch	102♠	8 April 1944	17:44	Yak-1	vicinity of An-Najman
91	14 March 1944	15:35	Yak-7	PQ 47751; 30 km (19 mi) south of Dornburg	103♠	8 April 1944	17:47	Yak-1	PQ 36232; 25 km (16 mi) southeast of Perekop
92	26 March 1944	16:00? (Note: According to Mathews and Foreman claimed at 16:06.)	Yak-1	PQ 47843; 10 km (6.2 mi) south of Genitschek	104	10 April 1944	08:16	Yak-7	Tomaschewka
93	6 April 1944	13:39	Yak-1	PQ 47771 south of Gromovka	105	13 April 1944	08:22	Yak-7	vicinity of Sevastopol; 15 km (9.3 mi) east of Sevastopol
94	7 April 1944	17:10? (Note: According to Mathews and Foreman claimed at 14:10.)	Il-2	PQ 55132 vicinity of Feodosia	106	13 April 1944	13:30	Yak-7	vicinity of An-Najman
– Stab II. Gruppe of Jagdgeschwader 52 – Eastern Front — September 1944
107	24 September 1944	09:22	Ju 87	PQ 37445; 10 km (6.2 mi) west-northwest of Turda	109	24 September 1944	11:45	La-5	PQ 37318; 40 km (25 mi) east-southeast of Klausenburg
108	24 September 1944	11:40	Il-2	PQ 37453; 10 km (6.2 mi) north of Turda	110	25 September 1944	13:37	Hs 129	PQ 37487 vicinity of Turda
– 5. Staffel of Jagdgeschwader 52 – Eastern Front — October – December 1944
111	18 October 1944	15:29	Yak-7	PQ 18617 north of Miki Peres	118	31 October 1944	15:28	Il-2	PQ 97243 west of Kecskemét
112	20 October 1944	07:59	La-5	PQ 08841; 30 km (19 mi) east of Szolnok	119	2 November 1944	11:35	Yak-9	PQ 98811; 30 km (19 mi) north-northwest of Nagykőrös
113	29 October 1944	14:35	La-5	PQ 08735; 25 km (16 mi) northeast of Szolnok	120	23 November 1944	11:21	Il-2	PQ 98454; 20 km (12 mi) southwest of Gyöngyös
114	29 October 1944	14:36	Il-2	PQ 08754 vicinity of Szolnok	121	23 November 1944	11:22	Il-2	PQ 98455; 20 km (12 mi) southwest of Gyöngyös
115	31 October 1944	15:18	La-5	PQ 97222 north of Kecskemét	122	22 December 1944	—	unknown	vicinity of Csór
116	31 October 1944	15:23	Il-2	PQ 97256 vicinity of Kecskemét	123	22 December 1944	—	unknown	vicinity of Csór
117	31 October 1944	15:26	La-5	PQ 97224 north of Kecskemét					

=== Awards ===
- Iron Cross (1939) 2nd and 1st Class
- Honor Goblet of the Luftwaffe on 26 July 1943 as Leutnant and pilot
- German Cross in Gold on 23 July 1943 as Leutnant in the Stab/Jagdgeschwader 52
- Knight's Cross of the Iron Cross on 26 March 1944 as Leutnant (war officer) and Staffelführer of the 4./Jagdgeschwader 52
