= Peter Düttmann =

German World War II fighter pilot

- Düttmann as a Leutnant
- Born: 23 May 1923; Gießen
- Died: 9 January 2001 (aged 77); Echterdingen, Germany
- Military career
- Allegiance: Nazi Germany (to 1945)
- Branch: Luftwaffe
- Service years: 1940–1945
- Rank: Leutnant (second lieutenant)
- Nicknames: Bonifaz, sometimes Bonifazius
- Unit: JG 52
- Commands: 5./JG 52
- Conflicts: World War II: Eastern Front
- Awards: Knight's Cross of the Iron Cross

Peter "Bonifazius" Düttmann (23 May 1923 – 9 January 2001) was a German Luftwaffe military aviator and fighter ace during World War II. He is credited with 152 aerial victories achieved in 398 combat missions, all of which claimed on the Eastern Front.

Born in Gießen, Düttmann grew up in the Weimar Republic and Nazi Germany. In 1940, he joined the military service of the Luftwaffe where he was trained as a fighter pilot. Following flight training, he was posted to Jagdgeschwader 52 (JG 52—52nd Fighter Wing) in May 1943. Flying with this wing, Düttmann claimed his first aerial victory on 21 May 1943 over a Soviet Air Forces fighter aircraft. Following his 91st aerial victory he was awarded the Knight's Cross of the Iron Cross on 9 June 1944. He claimed his 100th aerial victory on 25 September and was appointed squadron leader of 5. Staffel (5th squadron) of JG 52 in December. He led this squadron until the end of World War II. Düttmann died on 9 January 2001 in Echterdingen.

== Early life and career ==
Düttmann was born on 23 May 1923 in Gießen, at the time in People's State of Hesse in the Weimar Republic. His father was surgeon Dr. Erich Düttmann. Following flight training, (Note: Flight training in the Luftwaffe progressed through the levels A1, A2 and B1, B2, referred to as A/B flight training. A training included theoretical and practical training in aerobatics, navigation, long-distance flights and dead-stick landings. The B courses included high-altitude flights, instrument flights, night landings and training to handle the aircraft in difficult situations.) Düttmann was transferred to the Ergänzungs-Jagdgruppe Ost (Supplementary Fighter Group East) in southern France. In February 1943, Düttmann and other flight students of Ergänzungs-Jagdgruppe Ost under the leadership of Oberleutnant Walter Krupinski were based at La Leu Airfield near La Rochelle, France. There, Düttmann flew the Arado Ar 96. On some of his flights, he was joined by members of the Kriegsmarine's U-boat force who were made aware how easily a surfaced U-boat could be spotted from the air.

== World War II ==
Following completion of flight and fighter pilot training, Düttmann joined 5. Staffel (5th squadron), Jagdgeschwader 52 (JG 52—52nd Fighter Wing) on 7 May 1943. At the time, this squadron led by Leutnant Helmut Haberda who was killed in action on 8 May. Command of 5. Staffel was then temporarily given to Leutnant Josef Zwernemann who passed on command to Oberleutnant Wilhelm Batz on 26 May. The squadron was subordinated to II. Gruppe (2nd group) of JG 52 under the command of Hauptmann Helmut Kühle. II. Gruppe was based at Anapa and was fighting in the Battle of the Caucasus on the Eastern Front. Düttmann served with the same unit until the end of the war and soon became one of their most successful pilots, flying with Heinz Ewald and Heinz Sachsenberg. He claimed his first aerial victory on 21 May 1943 over a Polikarpov Po-2, also known as a U-2, in the vicinity of Krasnodar.

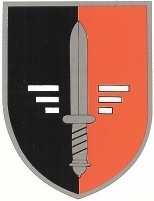
JG 52 Emblem

On 11 July 1943, Düttmann ditched his Bf 109 G-4 southeast of Anapa in the Black Sea after being hit by return fire form a formation of Douglas Boston medium bombers. In the early hours of 26 July, 15 Ilyushin Il-2 ground-attack aircraft, escorted by Yakovlev Yak-1 fighter aircraft, headed for German shipping off of Anapa. The Soviet flight was intercepted over sea and scattered. During this engagement, German pilots claimed ten aerial victories, five Il-2s and five Yak-1s, including an Il-2 and Yak-1 shot down by Düttmann. One of the aerial victories claimed by Düttmann was also 5. Staffel's 500th aerial victory to date. (Note: According to Weal, Düttmann claimed 5. Staffel's 500th aerial victory on 25 July 1943.) On 6 August, Düttmann was awarded the Iron Cross 2nd Class (Eisernes Kreuz zweiter Klasse).

Following aerial combat on 9 August 1943, he force landed his Bf 109 G-6 (Werknummer 19623—factory number) in no-man's land and was posted missing for 17 hours. On the 23 August 1943, his Bf 109 G-6 was again hit by anti-aircraft artillery resulting in a forced landing 5 kilometers (3.1 miles) west of Nikolajewka. on 17 August, Düttmann received the Front Flying Clasp of the Luftwaffe in Gold (Frontflugspange in Gold) and the Iron Cross 1st Class (Eisernes Kreuz erster Klasse) on 25 August. By end-1943, he was credited with 25 aerial victories. On 23 January 1944, Düttmann's Bf 109 G-6 was damaged three times in combat. At 08:00, during takeoff at Baherove, his aircraft was hit in the engine by a strafing Il-2 ground-attack aircraft. Later at 09:03, his Bf 109 G-6 was hit in aerial combat by a Bell P-39 Airacobra fighter aircraft resulting in a forced landing. At 14:45, his aircraft was hit by anti-aircraft artillery causing engine fire in flight. Nevertheless, he managed to return to his airfield and made a deadstick landing at Baherove.

On 28 February 1944, 4. and 5. Staffel was ordered to Grammatikowo located near Sovietskyi. On 13 March, the Gruppe returned to Baherove where they stayed for six days before again moving to Grammatikowo. On shuttle flight flown on 18 March, Düttmann's Bf 109 G-6 (Werknummer 15992) suffered engine failure, resulting in a forced landing at Aissul. He scored a further 18 kills in March 1944, 22 in April and 14 in May 1944. Düttmann became an "ace-in-a-day" for the first time on 11 April 1944 over the Kerch Peninsula. On 14 April, II. Gruppe moved to an airfield at Cape Chersonesus located at the Sevastopol Bay. On 15 April, he received the German Cross in Gold (Deutsches Kreuz in Gold). On 7 May 1944, he claimed nine aerial victories to take his score to 91. Suffering from combat fatigue he was sent on leave at the end of May and returned in September 1944. During this period, he was awarded the Knight's Cross of the Iron Cross (Ritterkreuz des Eisernen Kreuzes) on 9 June 1944.

=== Retreat through Hungary ===
Düttmann claimed his 100th aerial victory on 25 September 1944. He was the 92nd Luftwaffe pilot to achieve the century mark. On 1 November 1944, Düttmann, flying Bf 109 G-6 (Werknummer 167238), was involved in a ground accident at Ferihegy Airfield, killing his wingman Unteroffizier Heinrich Wester. Low on fuel, Wester had landed his Bf 109 G-14 (Werknummer 782775) first, the engine seized due to lack of fuel, leaving him sitting on the runway. Düttmann, who landed next, did not see Wester and crashed into his aircraft, killing him instantly.

On the 13 November 1944, he was shot down by an Il-2 rear gunner and bailed out at 1000 feet, landing behind enemy lines, but managing to reach German lines. The same happened to him on the 3 March 1945 due to AA damage and he returned a day later. On 23 December 1944, Düttmann was appointed Staffelkapitän (squadron leader) of 5. Staffel of JG 52. He replaced Hauptmann Heinrich Sturm who was killed in a flying accident the day before. On 1 March 1945, this squadron was renamed 6. Staffel of JG 52. On 24 April 1945, Düttmann claimed the destruction of a M4 Sherman tank 5 km (3.1 mi) southwest of Cham.

== Later life ==
Düttmann died on 9 January 2001 at the age of 77 in Echterdingen, Germany.

== Summary of career ==
=== Aerial victory claims ===
According to US historian David T. Zabecki, Düttmann was credited with 152 aerial victories. Obermaier also lists Düttmann with 152 aerial victories claimed in 398 combat missions, 21 of which were ground support missions. Both Spick and Weal state that his total of aerial victories was 150 claimed in 398 combat missions, and a mission-to-claim ratio of 2.65, plus two tanks destroyed which were counted as additional victories. Mathews and Foreman, authors of Luftwaffe Aces — Biographies and Victory Claims, researched the German Federal Archives and found records for 147 aerial victory claims, plus 45 further unconfirmed claims, including one North American P-51 Mustang. All of his confirmed victories were claimed on the Eastern Front. The authors Daniel and Gabor Horvath compared Soviet enemy loss reports to Düttmann's claims over Hungary. In the timeframe 16 October 1944 to 20 March 1945, Düttmann claimed 42 aerial victories, while the authors found 11 matching Soviet losses, a corroboration of 26%.

Victory claims were logged to a map-reference (PQ = Planquadrat), for example "PQ 34 Ost 96453". The Luftwaffe grid map (Jägermeldenetz) covered all of Europe, western Russia and North Africa and was composed of rectangles measuring 15 minutes of latitude by 30 minutes of longitude, an area of about 360 square miles (930 km^{2}). These sectors were then subdivided into 36 smaller units to give a location area 3 km × 4 km (1.9 mi × 2.5 mi) in size.

Chronicle of aerial victories
This and the ♠ (Ace of spades) indicates those aerial victories which made Düttmann an ace-in-a-day, a term which designates a fighter pilot who has shot down five or more airplanes in a single day. This and the – (dash) indicates unconfirmed aerial victory claims for which Düttmann did not receive credit. This and the ? (question mark) indicates information discrepancies listed by Barbas, Mathews and Foreman.
Claim	Date	Time	Type	Location	Claim	Date	Time	Type	Location
– 5. Staffel of Jagdgeschwader 52 – Eastern Front — 4 February – 31 December 1943
1	21 May 1943	15:48	U-2	PQ 34 Ost 96453, 20 km (12 mi) northeast of Krasnodar	17	6 September 1943	15:56	Yak-1	PQ 35 Ost 60314, 10 km (6.2 mi) north-northwest of Taranovka north of Taranovka
—	4 June 1943	18:30	La-5	vicinity of Krymskaja	—	7 September 1943	09:35	Yak-1	vicinity of Taranovka
2	10 June 1943	14:43	Yak-1	PQ 34 Ost 75173; 35 km (22 mi) southwest of Noworossijsi	18	8 September 1943	05:13	Il-2 m.H. (Note: The "m.H." refers to an Ilyushin Il-2 with rear gunner (mit Heckschütze).)	PQ 35 Ost 50521, 6 km (3.7 mi) east of Karlivka east of Karlivka
3	10 July 1943	07:40	Yak-1	PQ 34 Ost 66893, 20 km (12 mi) south of Wesselowka	—	13 September 1943	16:45	Yak-9	vicinity of Merefa
4	11 July 1943	11:53	Boston	PQ 34 Ost 75353, 45 km (28 mi) southeast of Anapa lake south of Anapa	—	21 September 1943	17:00	Il-2 m.H.	south-southwest of Kozelets
5	22 July 1943	12:04	Il-2 m.H.	PQ 34 Ost 76852, 15 km (9.3 mi) east of Varenikovskaya	—	23 September 1943	17:40	P-40	west of Pereiaslav
6	22 July 1943	17:01	Il-2 m.H.	PQ 34 Ost 75234, 3 km (1.9 mi) west of Krymskaja vicinity of Krymsk	19	25 September 1943	10:48	P-40	PQ 35 Ost 10131, 10 km (6.2 mi) southwest of Pereiaslav southwest of Pereiaslav
7	23 July 1943	06:14	Il-2 m.H.	PQ 34 Ost 75265, 5 km (3.1 mi) southwest of Krymskaja southwest of Krymsk	20	26 September 1943	17:23	P-40	PQ 35 Ost 1013, 10 km (6.2 mi) southwest of Pereiaslav southwest of Pereiaslav
8	23 July 1943	06:20	Il-2 m.H.	PQ 34 Ost 86773, 10 km (6.2 mi) northeast of Krymskaja northeast of Krymsk	—	2 October 1943	11:52	LaGG-3	vicinity of Cherkasy
9	26 July 1943	06:18	Il-2 m.H.	PQ 34 Ost 76774, 5 km (3.1 mi) southeast of Blagoweschtschenskoje lake south of Blagoweschtschenskaja	—	2 October 1943	11:57	LaGG-3	vicinity of Cherkasy
10	26 July 1943	06:27	Yak-1	PQ 34 Ost 75144, 5 km (3.1 mi) southwest of Anapa lake west of Anapa	—	3 October 1943	10:25	P-39	Michailowka
—	7 August 1943	11:25	Il-2 m.H.	Werenskowskaja	—	9 October 1943	13:10	Yak-1	south of Tamenj
—	8 August 1943	07:30	Il-2 m.H.	west of Belgorod	21	10 October 1943	15:38	Yak-1	PQ 4932, 10 km (6.2 mi) northwest of Werchnedneprowsk south of Borodajewka
11	8 August 1943	18:30	Boston	PQ 35 Ost 50683, 1 km (0.62 mi) west of Nizacha; 10 km (6.2 mi) west of Pavlovka	—	30 November 1943	09:59	Yak-1	southeast of Kolonka
12	11 August 1943	18:03	Boston	PQ 35 Ost 51514, 10 km (6.2 mi) west of Pavlovka; Nizacha	— ? (Note: This claim is not listed by Prien, Stemmer, Rodeike and Bock.)	28 December 1943	09:25	P-39	Cape Taulen
13	15 August 1943	11:25	La-5	PQ 35 Ost 51374, 5 km (3.1 mi) east of Krinitschnoje east of Kinitzeknoje	22	28 December 1943	10:57	Yak-1	3 km (1.9 mi) west of Cape Tusla
14	17 August 1943	05:56	Il-2	PQ 35 Ost 51312, 5 km (3.1 mi) north of Mosgowoj north of Mockorroj	23	29 December 1943	12:23	LaGG-3	5 km (3.1 mi) west-northwest of Cape Khroni west of Cape Khroni
15	17 August 1943	06:07	Il-2	PQ 35 Ost 51374, 10 km (6.2 mi) south of Borodskoje east of Borowskoje	24	29 December 1943	12:33	Yak-7	10 km (6.2 mi) southeast of Kerch
16	17 August 1943	09:02	Il-2	PQ 35 Ost 41434, 2 km (1.2 mi) northeast of Bazaiwschtschina northeast of Baratschina	25	29 December 1943	12:50	P-39	5 km (3.1 mi) south of Opassnaja south of Apannaja
—	19 August 1943	06:20	Yak-1	vicinity of Achtyrka	—	30 December 1943	13:45	P-39	east of Apassnaja; Opermeja
—	23 August 1943	13:30	Il-2 m.H.	northeast of Marinowka					
– 5. Staffel of Jagdgeschwader 52 – Eastern Front — 1 January – May 1944
26	3 January 1944	08:17	P-39	PQ 34 Ost 66813, 5 km (3.1 mi) west of Cape Tusla west of Cape Tusla	56	5 April 1944	13:11	La-5	southwest of Kerch
27	3 January 1944	08:25	P-39	south of Apassnaja	57	5 April 1944	17:26	Il-2	north of Katerles
—	4 January 1944	13:05	P-39	west of Cape Tusla	58	5 April 1944	17:30	P-40	city center of Kerch
—	9 January 1944	09:00	Yak-1	southwest of Eltigen	59	5 April 1944	17:31	P-40	northwest of Kerch
—	10 January 1944	06:55	Yak-1	west of Kerch	60? (Note: According to Mathews and Foreman, this claim is unconfirmed.)	6 April 1944	11:29	Yak-1	southeast of Perekop
—	10 January 1944	09:40	Il-2 m.H.	north east of Kolonka	61	8 April 1944	16:29	Yak-1	east of An-Najman
—	10 January 1944	14:05	P-39	northeast of Cape Khroni	62	9 April 1944	10:09	Il-2 m.H.	northwest of An-Najman
28	15 January 1944	07:21	Il-2 m.H.	north of Cape Tarchan	63	9 April 1944	10:12	Il-2 m.H.	west of An-Najman
29	17 January 1944	06:41	Il-2 m.H.	northwest of Bakssy	—	10 April 1944	07:50	Yak-7	southeast of Perekop
30	21 January 1944	11:41	P-40	southwest of Eltigen	64	10 April 1944	08:49	Yak-7	Tschumak
—	5 February 1944	11:40	P-39	south of Kolonka	65	10 April 1944	17:47	Yak-7	north of An-Najman
—	6 February 1944	07:40	P-39	southeast of Kolonka	—	11 April 1944	06:05	Yak-7	vicinity of Perekop
—	7 February 1944	14:20	Yak-1	north of Cape Khroni	66♠	11 April 1944	06:19	Yak-7	west of Michailowka
31	10 February 1944	09:26	Yak-1	west of Bakssy vicinity of Bulganek	67♠	11 April 1944	10:50	Yak-7	Nowo Ivanovka
32	10 February 1944	12:00	LaGG-3	east of Apassnaja vicinity of Kolonka	68♠	11 April 1944	10:54	Yak-7	northwest of Dzhankoi
33	12 February 1944	08:52	Yak-1	east of Majak	69♠	11 April 1944	10:56	P-39	northeast of Kakankut
34	13 February 1944	07:28	P-39	southeast of Apassnaja	70♠	11 April 1944	10:59	Il-2 m.H.	vicinity of Dzhankoi
35	13 February 1944	15:07	P-39	east of Gorkom	71♠	11 April 1944	14:53	Yak-7	southwest of Dzhankoi
36	14 February 1944	11:27	P-39	east of Kolonka	—	13 April 1944	08:23	Il-2 m.H.	Bachtschasanj
—	15 February 1944	09:27	P-39	southwest of Kossa Tusla; Cape Tusla	— ? (Note: This unconfirmed claim is not listed by Mathews and Foreman.)	13 April 1944	08:27	Yak-7	vicinity of Simferopol
—	15 February 1944	09:29	P-39	south-southeast of Kossa Tusla; Cape Tusla	—	15 April 1944	09:15	Il-2 m.H.	west of Sevastopol
37	26 February 1944	12:24	P-40	east of Kerch	72	17 April 1944	13:46	Yak-7	5 km (3.1 mi) west of Belbek
—	29 February 1944	09:25	P-40	south of Iljitsch	73	17 April 1944	13:47	Il-2 m.H.	north of Belbek
38	1 March 1944	08:03	P-40	east of Apassnaja	—	18 April 1944	06:30	Yak-9	northwest of Sevastopol
39	2 March 1944	09:55	Yak-1	Adshin Uschkaj	? (Note: This claim is not listed by Barbas.)	22 April 1944	17:00	Boston	vicinity of Balaklava
40	11 March 1944	16:22	Yak-1	south of Michailkowka	74	23 April 1944	06:17	Yak-7	west-northwest of Belbek
41	12 March 1944	07:45	P-40	Kamysch Burun	75	24 April 1944	17:00	Boston	west of Balaklava
42	12 March 1944	07:52	P-40	northern Kerch	76	24 April 1944	17:28	Boston	east-southeast of Sevastopol
43	13 March 1944	08:35	Il-2	east of Feodosia	77	25 April 1944	14:12	Yak-7	northwest of Balaklava
44	14 March 1944	13:00	LaGG-3	southwest of Saporoshkaja	78	1 May 1944	13:54	Yak-9	west of Belbek
45	16 March 1944	10:10	Il-2 m.H.	south of Bakssy	79	1 May 1944	14:04	Yak-9	west of Akhis
46	16 March 1944	10:11	Il-2 m.H.	northeast of Bakssy	80	6 May 1944	15:58	Yak-7	west of Belbek
47	16 March 1944	10:12	Il-2 m.H.	southeast of Bakssy	81	6 May 1944	15:59	Yak-7	south-southwest of Belbek
48	16 March 1944	10:13	P-40	southwest of Bakssy	82	6 May 1944	16:00	Yak-7	southeast of Belbek
49	17 March 1944	09:18	LaGG-3	east of Feodosia	83♠	7 May 1944	12:21	Yak-9	southeast of Balaklava
50	17 March 1944	09:20	LaGG-3	east of Feodosia	84♠	7 May 1944	12:24	P-40	north of Balaklava
51	17 March 1944	09:21	LaGG-3	east of Feodosia	85♠	7 May 1944	12:26	P-40	north-northeast of Balaklava
52	17 March 1944	09:23	LaGG-3	east of Feodosia	86♠	7 May 1944	16:55	P-40	northeast of Balaklava
53	26 March 1944	09:23	Il-2 m.H.	south of Sacharowka	87♠	7 May 1944	17:03	Yak-7	north of Balaklava
54	26 March 1944	16:07	Yak-1	northwest of Tschigary	88♠	7 May 1944	17:05	Il-2 m.H.	northwest of Balaklava
55	26 March 1944	16:08	Yak-1	south of Tschigary	89♠	7 May 1944	17:07	Yak-7	south of Balaklava
—	3 April 1944	10:02	Yak-7	south of Cape Takyl	90♠	7 May 1944	17:08	Yak-7	north of Balaklava
—	3 April 1944	10:03	Yak-7	southeast of Cape Takyl	91♠	7 May 1944	17:10	Il-2 m.H.	west-southwest of Balaklava
– 6. Staffel of Jagdgeschwader 52 – Eastern Front — September – November 1944
92	17 September 1944	17:25	IAR 80	south of Thorenburg	110	21 October 1944	10:56	Yak-11	south-southeast of Szolnok
93	17 September 1944	17:35	He 111	north of Frata	111	21 October 1944	10:58	Yak-11	south of Szolnok
94	19 September 1944	17:45? (Note: According to Mathews and Foreman claimed at 17:46.)	Yak-11	south of Thorenburg	112	23 October 1944	15:34	Il-2 m.H.	southeast of Szolnok
95	19 September 1944	17:46	Yak-11	south-southwest of Thorenburg	113	30 October 1944	13:21	MiG-3	west of Nyíregyháza
96	23 September 1944	10:40	Yak-9	east of Thorenburg	114	30 October 1944	13:24	MiG-3	south-southeast of Nyíregyháza
97	24 September 1944	11:40	La-5	northwest of Ceanul	115	31 October 1944	08:21	Il-2 m.H.	southeast of Szolnok
98	24 September 1944	11:42	La-5	east of Moinești	116?	31 October 1944	14:15	Il-2 m.H.	east of Cegléd
99	24 September 1944	14:20	La-5	east-southeast of Thorenburg	117	31 October 1944	14:17	Il-2 m.H.	southeast of Cegléd
100	24 September 1944	14:27	La-5	south of Tureni	118	31 October 1944	14:19	Il-2 m.H.	north of Nagykőrös
101	25 September 1944	09:35	IAR 80? (Note: According to Mathews and Foreman, claimed as a Yakovlev Yak-5.)	south of Thorenburg	119♠?	1 November 1944	14:02	Yak-9	east of Kecskemét
102	25 September 1944	09:37	IAR 80	southwest of Thorenburg	120♠	1 November 1944	14:03	Yak-9	north of Kecskemét
103	25 September 1944	09:46? (Note: According to Mathews and Foreman claimed at 09:40.)	IAR 80	south of Thorenburg	121♠	1 November 1944	14:05	Yak-9	south-southwest of Abony
104	25 September 1944	11:30	La-5	north-northeast of Thorenburg	122♠	1 November 1944	14:06	Yak-9	south of Nagykőrös
105	16 October 1944	15:50	La-5	southwest of Derecske	123♠	1 November 1944	14:09	Il-2	east of Kecskemét
106	16 October 1944	15:54	La-5	south of Derecske	124	7 November 1944	16:05	La-5	north-northeast of Abony
107	18 October 1944	13:30	Yak-9	north of Mikepércs	125	13 November 1944	09:02	Yak-11	south-southwest of Tápiószele
108	18 October 1944	13:34	Yak-9	northeast of Mikepércs	126	13 November 1944	09:05	Yak-11	south-southwest of Tápiószele
109	19 October 1944	09:21	Yak-7	west-northwest of Debrecen	127	13 November 1944	12:20	Il-2 m.H.	north of Jászberény
—	19 October 1944	18:00? (Note: According to Mathews and Foreman claimed at 08:00.)	La-5	5 km (3.1 mi) northwest of Szolnok					
– 6. Staffel of Jagdgeschwader 52 – Eastern Front — 1 March – 8 May 1945
128	8 March 1945	16:24	Yak-3	3 km (1.9 mi) southwest of Aba	138	19 March 1945	14:56	Yak-3	north of Stuhlweißenburg
129	8 March 1945	16:27	Yak-3	4 km (2.5 mi) south of Aba	139	19 March 1945	15:03	La-5	south-southwest of Stuhlweißenburg
130	9 March 1945	13:51	La-5	12 km (7.5 mi) east of Káloz	—	20 March 1945	14:05	P-51	10 km (6.2 mi) west-southwest of Veszprém
131	9 March 1945	13:53	Il-2 m.H.	18 km (11 mi) east of Káloz	140	5 April 1945	13:32	Il-2 m.H.	west of Götzendorf
—	11 March 1945	13:23	Yak-9	southwest of Sebedražie	141	5 April 1945	13:33	Il-2 m.H.	southwest of Götzendorf
—	11 March 1945	13:26	Yak-9	south of Polgárdi	142	9 April 1945	08:53	Boston	Mödling
132	11 March 1945	15:21? (Note: According to Mathews and Foreman claimed at 13:21.)	Yak-9	6 km (3.7 mi) southeast of Káloz	143	9 April 1945	08:54	Boston	northeast of Mödling
133	14 March 1945	12:55	Boston	8 km (5.0 mi) north of Aba	144	10 April 1945	12:23	Yak-3	east of Enzersdorf
—	16 March 1945	13:55	Il-2 m.H.	south of Pákozd	145	10 April 1945	12:27	La-5	west of Enzersdorf
—	16 March 1945	13:56	Il-2 m.H.	north of Stuhlweißenburg	146	13 April 1945	14:50	Yak-3	Vienna
134	16 March 1945	13:58	Il-2 m.H.	6 km (3.7 mi) west of Pákozd	147	13 April 1945	14:52	Yak-3	north of Simmering
135	16 March 1945	13:59	Il-2 m.H.	3 km (1.9 mi) northwest of Pákozd	148	13 April 1945	14:58	Il-2 m.H.	north-northwest of Sievering
136	16 March 1945	14:01	Il-2 m.H.	6 km (3.7 mi) northeast of Pákozd	149	13 April 1945	15:03	Yak-9	west of Neuwaldegg
—	18 March 1945	14:05	Yak-3	3 km (1.9 mi) southeast of Káloz	150	15 April 1945	09:12	Yak-9	east of Kostel train station
137	19 March 1945	11:52	Il-2 m.H.	Stuhlweißenburg					

=== Awards ===
- Pilot's Badge (12 February 1942)
- Iron Cross (1939)
  - 2nd Class (6 August 1943)
  - 1st Class (25 August 1943)
- Front Flying Clasp of the Luftwaffe for Fighter Pilots in Gold (17 August 1943)
- Honor Goblet of the Luftwaffe on 20 March 1944 as Feldwebel and pilot (Note: According to Obermaier and original award document on 8 February 1944.)
- German Cross in Gold on 15 April 1944 as Fahnenjunker-Feldwebel in the 5./Jagdgeschwader 52
- Knight's Cross of the Iron Cross on 9 June 1944 as Leutnant (war officer) and pilot in the 5./Jagdgeschwader 52 (Note: According to Von Seemen and Weal on 9 May 1944.)

=== Dates of rank ===
21 September 1943:	Feldwebel (Technical Sergeant), effective as of 1 October 1943
1 February 1944:	Leutnant (Second Lieutenant)

== Works ==
- Düttmann, Peter (2002). Klinnert, Falk (ed.). Wir kämpften in einsamen Höhen [We Fought in Lonely Heights] (in German). Leipzig, Germany: Kunst- & Verlagsbuchbinderei.
