= Hans Waldmann =

Hans Waldmann may refer to:

- Hans Waldmann (mayor) (1435–1489), mayor of Zurich and Swiss military leader
- Hans Waldmann (fighter pilot) (1922–1945), German Luftwaffe fighter pilot
