= Helmut Lipfert =

German World War II fighter pilot

- Lipfert in 1945
- Born: 6 August 1916; Lippelsdorf, Landkreis Saalfeld, Duchy of Saxe-Meiningen, German Empire
- Died: 10 August 1990 (aged 74); Einbeck, Lower Saxony, West Germany
- Military career
- Allegiance: Nazi Germany
- Branch: Army (1937–1941); Luftwaffe (1941–1945)
- Service years: 1937–1945
- Rank: Hauptmann (Captain)
- Units: 1st Panzer Division; JG 52, JG 53
- Commands: 4./JG 52, 6./JG 52, I./JG 53
- Conflicts: See battles World War II: Invasion of Poland; Battle of France; Eastern Front; Operation Southwind; Operation Spring Awakening
- Awards: Knight's Cross of the Iron Cross with Oak Leaves
- Other work: school teacher

Helmut Lipfert (6 August 1916 – 10 August 1990) was a German Luftwaffe military aviator during World War II. Lipfert ranks as the world's thirteenth fighter ace. Lipfert was credited with 203 victories achieved in 687 combat missions. All his victories were claimed over the Eastern Front and included a P-51 Mustang, 41 Yakovlev Yak-1, 41 Yakovlev Yak-9 fighters, two four-engine bombers and 39 Ilyushin Il-2 ground-attack aircraft. He was shot down fifteen times, without being injured.

Born in Lippelsdorf, Lipfert joined the military service in 1937, at first serving with the 1st Panzer Division before he transferred to the Luftwaffe in 1941. Trained as a fighter pilot, Lipfert was posted to Jagdgeschwader 52 (JG 52—52nd Fighter Wing) in late 1942. He claimed his first aerial victory in January 1943. In March 1943, Lipfert was appointed acting Staffelkapitän (squadron leader) of 4. Staffel (4th squadron) of JG 52. Following his 90th aerial victory claimed, he was awarded the Knight's Cross of the Iron Cross in April 1944. In February 1945, Lipfert was appointed Gruppenkommandeur (group commander) of I. Gruppe of Jagdgeschwader 53 (JG 53—53rd Fighter Wing). In April 1945, he claimed his 200th aerial victory and was awarded the Knight's Cross of the Iron Cross with Oak Leaves.

Following World War II, Lipfert became a school teacher. He died on 10 August 1990 in Einbeck, West Germany.

== Early life and career ==
Lipfert was born on 6 August 1916 in Lippelsdorf, present-day a borough of Gräfenthal, at the time in Duchy of Saxe-Meiningen, as part of the German Empire. Following the compulsory labour service (Reichsarbeitsdienst), Lipfert joined the military service with Nachrichten-Abteilung 37 (37th Signals Battalion), a unit of 1st Panzer Division on 3 November 1937.

== World War II ==
World War II in Europe had begun on Friday, 1 September 1939, when German forces invaded Poland. Lipfert, who held the rank of Unteroffizier (sergeant), participated in the Invasion of Poland and in the Battle of France as a member of the 1st Panzer Division. In early 1941, he transferred to the Luftwaffe where he trained as a fighter pilot. (Note: Flight training in the Luftwaffe progressed through the levels A1, A2 and B1, B2, referred to as A/B flight training. A training included theoretical and practical training in aerobatics, navigation, long-distance flights and dead-stick landings. The B courses included high-altitude flights, instrument flights, night landings and training to handle the aircraft in difficult situations.) He was promoted to Fahnenjunker-Feldwebel (officer cadet) on 16 June 1942 and to Leutnant (second lientenant) on 1 August 1942.

Lipfert was then posted to the Ergänzungs-Jagdgruppe Ost (Supplementary Fighter Group, East) based at Saint-Jean-d'Angély, France and then via the Frontleitstelle Krakau, front dispatch center based at Krakau, to 6. Staffel (6th squadron) of Jagdgeschwader 52 (JG 52—52nd Fighter Wing) on 16 December 1942. (Note: For an explanation of Luftwaffe unit designations, see Organization of the Luftwaffe during World War II.) At the time, JG 52 was based on the southern sector of the Eastern Front in the vicinity of Stalingrad. His 6. Staffel was commanded by Oberleutnant Rudolf Resch and subordinated to II. Gruppe (4th group) of JG 52 headed by Hauptmann Johannes Steinhoff. The Gruppe was based at an airfield near Morozovsk and fighting in the Battle of Stalingrad.

=== Eastern Front ===
On 18 December 1942, on one of his first combat missions, Lipfert made a forced landing in his Messerschmitt Bf 109 G-2 (Werknummber 14154—factory number) due to engine failure. He is remembered by contemporaries as a consistent, professional pilot and leader. He withdrew often from squadron mates into long periods of contemplation. On 22 January 1943, II. Gruppe moved to an airfield at Rostov-on-Don. There, Lipfert claimed his first aerial victory over a Lavochkin La-5, a radial engined fighter aircraft, on the 30 January, near Malaya Balabinka, approximately 80 km (50 mi) east of Rostov-on-Don.

On 20 March 1943, Lipfert was appointed acting Staffelkapitän (squadron leader) of 4. Staffel (4th squadron) of JG 52. He replaced Leutnant Wolf-Dieter von Coester in this capacity who had been killed in action that day. Following the death of Oberleutnant Karl Ritzenberger on 24 May, Lipfert was transferred to take command of 6. Staffel (6th squadron) of JG 52. He was succeeded by Leutnant Heinrich Sturm as commander of 4. Staffel.

On 8 October, he shot down five Russian aircraft (kills 30 to 34). Four more were shot down on 5 December and his score raised to 72. By the end of 1943 his victories total had reached 80, making him the fourth most successful active fighter pilot of II. Gruppe. On 28 January 1944, Lipfert was awarded the German Cross in Gold (Deutsches Kreuz in Gold). On 5 April, his 90th air victory had won him the Knight's Cross of the Iron Cross (Ritterkreuz des Eisernen Kreuzes). Six days later, 11 April 1944, an "all-white Sturmovik" provided him with his 100th aerial victory. He was the 69th Luftwaffe pilot to achieve the century mark.

The Germans had to retreat from eastern the Crimea to Kherson near Sevastopol. There, the Luftwaffe Gruppen were subjected to near-constant Soviet bombing raids, and Lipfert's 6./JG 52, in particular, lost a number of aircraft. . Later, they evacuated to Romania. On 11 June 1944 he destroyed his first United States Army Air Forces (USAAF) four engined bomber, a Boeing B-17 Flying Fortress north-northwest of Tătăruși, his 127th aerial victory. Two weeks later, on the 24 of June, he downed a Consolidated B-24 Liberator over Ștefănești in the historical Romanian region of Moldavia, his 128th claim. His 150th claim was filed on 24 October 1944, a Yakovlev Yak-7 over Feherto, Hungary.

=== Group commander ===
Lipfert was appointed Gruppenkommandeur (group commander) of I. Gruppe of Jagdgeschwader 53 (JG 53—53rd Fighter Wing) on 15 February 1945. He thus replaced Hauptmann Erich Hartmann who had briefly led the Gruppe after its former commander, Major Jürgen Harder, was transferred. Command of 6. Staffel of JG 52 was given to Leutnant Heinz Ewald. At the time, the Gruppe was based in Veszprém and had been fighting in the siege of Budapest, where German forces had surrendered on 13 February. The Gruppe then supported German forces in Operation Southwind, eliminating the Soviet bridgehead on the west bank of the river Hron, predominantly fighting over Esztergom. On 20 February, Lipfert was ordered to move the Gruppe to Piešťany, located approximately 75 kilometers (47 miles) northeast of Vienna, where they arrived the following day. The following day, I. Gruppe again flew combat air patrols over Esztergom. That day, Lipfert claimed his first two aerial victories with JG 53 when he shot down a La-5 and Yak-3 fighter, taking his total to 181. By 25 February, German forces had eliminated the Soviet bridgehead west of the Hron. That day, I. Gruppe flew combat missions to Zvolen (Altsohl). On a morning mission, Lipfert claimed a Yak-9 fighter shot down.

On 26 February, water from the Váh started flooding the airfield at Piešťany. The airfield had to be abandoned and I. Gruppe first moved to Pápa before returning to Veszprém on 28 February. Lipfert claimed his 183rd aerial victory, an Il-2 ground-attack aircraft, on 8 March. The following day, German forces attacked Soviet positions on both sides of Lake Balaton during Operation Spring Awakening. Supporting this operation, I. Gruppe flew many missions to the combat areas near Zvolen and Székesfehérvár (Stuhlweißenburg). On 11 March, Lipfert shot down a Yak-3 fighter near Sárbogárd and another Yak-3 near Siófok. From 12 to 17 March, I. Gruppe continued fighting in the vicinity of Székesfehérvár. In this timeframe, Lipfert claimed his 186th aerial victory on 13 March, his 187th and 188th on 14 March, and his 189th on 17 March. On 20 March, with Soviet forces advancing, ground combat shifted to the area north of Lake Velence and to Székesfehérvár. Flying his second mission of the day, Lipfert shot down two Il-2 ground-attack aircraft, the first near Székesfehérvár, the second near Várpalota. On 22 March, the airfield Veszprém was taken by Soviet forces and the Gruppe relocated to Pápa where they were joined by the Stab (headquarters unit) of Jagdgeschwader 76 (JG 76—76th Fighter Wing).

On 5 April, I. Gruppe moved from Fels am Wagram to Brno. Three days later, Lipfert claimed his 200th aerial victory in the vicinity of Hainburg an der Donau, west of Bratislava. He flew his last and 687th combat mission on 16 April, claiming a Yakovlev Yak-9 fighter shot down, taking his total to 203 aerial victories. The next day, he was awarded the Knight's Cross of the Iron Cross with Oak Leaves (Ritterkreuz des Eisernen Kreuzes mit Eichenlaub). He was the 837th member of the German armed forces to be so honored. The presentation was made by Generalleutnant Paul Deichmann, commanding general of I. Fliegerkorps (1st Air Corps), on 17 April.

== Later life ==
After the war, Lipfert became a school teacher, and was seldom seen by his war comrades. He died on 10 August 1990 at the age of 74 in Einbeck. He was buried at the local cemetery in Einbeck.

== Summary of career ==
=== Aerial victory claims ===
According to US historian David T. Zabecki, Lipfert was credited with 203 aerial victories. According to Spick, Lipfert was credited with 203 aerial victories claimed in approximately 700 combat missions, and a mission-to-claim ratio of 3.45. All of his aerial victories were claimed on the Eastern Front and include two USAAF four-engine bombers claimed over Romania. Mathews and Foreman, authors of Luftwaffe Aces — Biographies and Victory Claims, researched the German Federal Archives and found records for 200 aerial victory claims, plus six further unconfirmed claims. This figure of confirmed claims includes 198 aerial victories on the Eastern Front and two on the Western Front, including one four-engined bomber. The authors Daniel and Gabor Horvath compared Soviet enemy loss reports to Lipfert's claims over Hungary. In the timeframe 17 October 1944 to 21 March 1945, Lipfert claimed 52 aerial victories, while the authors found 48 matching Soviet losses, a corroboration of 92%.

Victory claims were logged to a map-reference (PQ = Planquadrat), for example "PQ 08693". The Luftwaffe grid map (Jägermeldenetz) covered all of Europe, western Russia and North Africa and was composed of rectangles measuring 15 minutes of latitude by 30 minutes of longitude, an area of about 360 square miles (930 km^{2}). These sectors were then subdivided into 36 smaller units to give a location area 3 km × 4 km (1.9 mi × 2.5 mi) in size.

Chronicle of aerial victories
This and the ♠ (Ace of spades) indicates those aerial victories which made Lipfert an "ace-in-a-day", a term which designates a fighter pilot who has shot down five or more airplanes in a single day. This and the – (dash) indicates unconfirmed aerial victory claims for which Lipfert did not receive credit. This and the ? (question mark) indicates information discrepancies listed by Prien, Stemmer, Rodeike, Bock, Mathews and Foreman.
Claim	Date	Time	Type	Location	Claim	Date	Time	Type	Location
– 6. Staffel of Jagdgeschwader 52 –
1	30 January 1943	12:47	La-5	PQ 08693, 1 km (0.62 mi) north of Malaya-Balabinka	92	7 April 1944	07:27	Yak-7	north-northeast of Tschumak; 15 km (9.3 mi) north-northeast of Tschumak
2	25 February 1943	14:58	Il-2	PQ 34 Ost 86763, 5 km (3.1 mi) west of Fedorowskaja	93	8 April 1944	14:22	Il-2 m.H. (Note: The "m.H." refers to an Ilyushin Il-2 with rear gunner (mit Heckschütze).)	east of Tschigary; 10 km (6.2 mi) east of Tschigary
3	28 February 1943	13:15	LaGG-3	PQ 34 Ost 75433, 5 km (3.1 mi) southeast of Novorossijsk	94	8 April 1944	14:32	R-5	southeast of Iwanówka; 14 km (8.7 mi) southeast of Iwanówka
4	7 March 1943	08:20	R-5	2 km (1.2 mi) north of Popowitschewskaja	95	9 April 1944	14:40	Yak-7	Tomaschewka; 6 km (3.7 mi) east of Tomaschewka
5	7 March 1943	08:23	R-5	PQ 34 Ost 86731, Iwanowskaja	96	9 April 1944	15:58	Pe-2	Gramatikovo; 15 km (9.3 mi) north of Gramatikovo
6	14 March 1943	06:56	Il-2	PQ 34 Ost 75431, 3 km (1.9 mi) southeast of Novorossijsk	97	10 April 1944	08:16	Yak-7	Tomaschewka; 12 km (7.5 mi) east of Tomaschewka
7? (Note: According to Mathews and Foreman claimed with 4. Staffel of Jagdgeschwader 52.)	30 March 1943	06:26	LaGG-3	PQ 34 Ost 86571, 10 km (6.2 mi) northwest of Slavyanskaya	98	10 April 1944	12:12	Il-2 m.H.	southeast of Megasinka
8?	30 March 1943	15:15	LaGG-3	PQ 34 Ost 76651, 5 km (3.1 mi) northwest of Anastasiewskaja	99	11 April 1944	07:02	Yak-7	Dzhankoi; 18 km (11 mi) west-northwest of Dzhankoi
9?	20 April 1943	06:30	MiG-3	PQ 34 Ost 85114, 20 km (12 mi) northwest of Abinskaya	100	11 April 1944	09:25	Il-2 m.H.	Dzhankoi; 15 km (9.3 mi) northwest of Dzhankoi
10	25 June 1943	16:13	LaGG-3	PQ 34 Ost 76694, 8 km (5.0 mi) northeast of Anastasiewskaja	101	15 April 1944	10:47? (Note: According to Mathews and Foreman claimed at 10:44.)	Il-2 m.H.	Sevastopol; 6 km (3.7 mi) southeast of Sevastopol
11	25 June 1943	16:23	LaGG-3	PQ 34 Ost 76692, 1 km (0.62 mi) southwest of Deschi	102	17 April 1944	15:49	Yak-7	Dzhankoi; 2 km (1.2 mi) south of Dzhankoi
12	16 July 1943	05:45	Yak-1	PQ 34 Ost 86232, 10 km (6.2 mi) northwest of Krymskaja	103	19 April 1944	14:21	P-40	Sevastopol; 10 km (6.2 mi) northwest of Sevastopol
13	19 July 1943	13:55	Yak-1	PQ 34 Ost 75263, 5 km (3.1 mi) southwest of Bakanskaja	104	19 April 1944	17:05	Il-2 m.H.	Sevastopol; 12 km (7.5 mi) southeast of Sevastopol
14	21 July 1943	09:37	Yak-1	PQ 34 Ost 76831, 3 km (1.9 mi) south of Anastasiewskaja	105	22 April 1944	09:40	Boston	Sevastopol; 55 km (34 mi) southwest of Sevastopol
15	21 July 1943	16:43	Yak-1	PQ 34 Ost 75741, 15 km (9.3 mi) southeast of Cape Utrish	106	27 April 1944	10:50	Yak-7	Kadykowka; 8 km (5.0 mi) southeast of Kadykowka
16	23 July 1943	05:54	P-39	PQ 34 Ost 76894, 5 km (3.1 mi) southeast of Kijewskoje	107	3 May 1944	18:35	Yak-7	north of Belbek; 5 km (3.1 mi) north of Belbek
17	23 July 1943	17:33	Il-2	PQ 34 Ost 75264, 10 km (6.2 mi) southwest of Krymskaja	108	4 May 1944	06:44	Yak-7	10 km (6.2 mi) west of Saky
18	3 September 1943	10:41	La-5	PQ 35 Ost 40262, 8 km (5.0 mi) south of Kotelwa	109	4 May 1944	09:10	Yak-7	northwest of Belbek; 4 km (2.5 mi) northwest of Belbek
19	4 September 1943	17:17	Il-2 m.H.	PQ 35 Ost 41574, 2 km (1.2 mi) northwest of Jurewka	110	5 May 1944	10:38	Yak-7	southeast of Balaklava; 5 km (3.1 mi) southeast of Balaklava
20	5 September 1943	10:30	Yak-1	PQ 35 Ost 60343, 4 km (2.5 mi) south of Taranowka	111	5 May 1944	10:50	Yak-7	Laspi Bay; 3 km (1.9 mi) south of Laspi Bay
21	21 September 1943	07:16	Yak-1	PQ 35 Ost 11142, Kozelets	112	5 May 1944	14:05	Il-2 m.H.	north of Belbek; 3 km (1.9 mi) north of Belbek
22	24 September 1943	13:55	P-40	PQ 35 Ost 11751, 3 km (1.9 mi) northeast of Jerkowzy	113	6 May 1944	07:30	Yak-1	southwest of Belbek; 8 km (5.0 mi) southwest of Belbek
23	24 September 1943	16:40	La-5	PQ 35 Ost 11714, 10 km (6.2 mi) south of Jerkowzy	114	6 May 1944	07:40	U-2	southwest of Belbek; 7 km (4.3 mi) southwest of Belbek
24	25 September 1943	17:35	Il-2 m.H.	PQ 35 Ost 11782, 9 km (5.6 mi) west of Perejasslaw	115	7 May 1944	09:40	Yak-1	north of Balaklava; 5 km (3.1 mi) north of Balaklava
25	28 September 1943	17:35	R-5	PQ 35 Ost 11714, 13 km (8.1 mi) west of Perejasslaw	116	7 May 1944	09:45	Yak-1	Sevastopol; 10 km (6.2 mi) east-southeast of Sevastopol
26	1 October 1943	16:13	Yak-9	PQ 35 Ost 58163, 1 km (0.62 mi) south of Barbosta	117	7 May 1944	09:49	Yak-1	northeast of Balaklava; 4 km (2.5 mi) northeast of Sevastopol
27	7 October 1943	06:57	La-5	PQ 34 Ost 39432, west of Annowka	118	30 May 1944	16:01	Yak-1? (Note: According to Mathews and Foreman claimed as a Yakovlev Yak-11.)	northeast of Iași; 10 km (6.2 mi) northeast of Iași
28	7 October 1943	11:07	La-5	PQ 34 Ost 49774, 5 km (3.1 mi) west of Orlik	119	30 May 1944	16:04	Yak-1?	northeast of Iași; 10 km (6.2 mi) northeast of Iași
29	7 October 1943	11:28	Yak-9	PQ 34 Ost 49153, 12 km (7.5 mi) north of Orlik	120	31 May 1944	08:04	Pe-2	east of Busila; 3 km (1.9 mi) east of Busila
30♠	8 October 1943	07:05	Il-2 m.H.	PQ 34 Ost 66692, 9 km (5.6 mi) west of Achtanisowskaja	121	31 May 1944	14:32	Il-2 m.H.	northeast of Iași; 7 km (4.3 mi) northeast of Iași
31♠	8 October 1943	08:23	LaGG-3	PQ 34 Ost 66624, 2 km (1.2 mi) north of Jljitsch	122	4 June 1944	18:56	Yak-1	east-southeast of Soulani; 3 km (1.9 mi) east-southeast of Soulani
32♠	8 October 1943	08:35	Yak-1	PQ 34 Ost 75543, 3 km (1.9 mi) south of Fischerei	123	5 June 1944	07:58	P-39	northeast of Zahorna; 3 km (1.9 mi) northeast of Zahorna
33♠	8 October 1943	15:33	Yak-9	PQ 34 Ost 6669, 20 km (12 mi) northeast of Taman	124	5 June 1944	08:01	Yak-7	north of Zahorna; 3 km (1.9 mi) north of Zahorna
34♠	8 October 1943	15:42	Yak-9	PQ 34 Ost 66692, 12 km (7.5 mi) west of Achtanisowskaja	125	5 June 1944	11:35	Yak-7	southwest of Carpiti; 4 km (2.5 mi) southwest of Carpiti
35	10 October 1943	13:05	Yak-1	PQ 34 Ost 39291, 4 km (2.5 mi) northwest of Mishorin-Rog	126? (Note: According to Mathews and Foreman this claim is unconfirmed.)	5 June 1944	11:45	Boston	south of Românești; 3 km (1.9 mi) south of Românești
36	10 October 1943	13:15	Yak-1	PQ 34 Ost 49312, 2 km (1.2 mi) south of Borodajewka	127?	11 June 1944	09:45	B-17	north-northwest of Tataturi; 7 km (4.3 mi) north-northwest of Tataturi
37	20 October 1943	07:30	Yak-1	PQ 34 Ost 39453, 10 km (6.2 mi) south of Popelnastoje	128	24 June 1944	09:42	B-24	southwest of Ștefănești; 7 km (4.3 mi) southwest of Ștefănești
38	21 October 1943	05:55	Yak-1	PQ 34 Ost 39482, 10 km (6.2 mi) northwest of Pjatichatki	129	27 June 1944	10:34	Il-2 m.H.	northeast of Jasski; 3 km (1.9 mi) northeast of Jasski
39	21 October 1943	06:08	Yak-1	PQ 34 Ost 49372, 12 km (7.5 mi) southwest of Werchnedjeprowsk	130	14 July 1944	07:55	P-39	Shchurovychi; 18 km (11 mi) northwest of Shchurovychi
40	21 October 1943	12:30	La-5	PQ 34 Ost 39612, 10 km (6.2 mi) northwest of Pjatichatki	131	15 July 1944	15:20	Yak-7	northwest of Horokhiv; 10 km (6.2 mi) northwest of Horokhiv
41	26 October 1943	07:15	Yak-1	PQ 34 Ost 57123, 2 km (1.2 mi) south of Melitopol	132	16 July 1944	13:23	Il-2 m.H.	southern edge of Plowe
42	26 October 1943	07:17	Yak-1	PQ 34 Ost 57152, 3 km (1.9 mi) northwest of Melitopol	133	16 July 1944	13:27	Yak-7	southwest of Stojanow; 10 km (6.2 mi) southwest of Stojanow
43	29 October 1943	07:00	Yak-1	PQ 34 Ost 47331, 10 km (6.2 mi) northeast of Agaiman	134	18 July 1944	15:12	La-5	west of Zaczernecze; 4 km (2.5 mi) west of Zaczernecze
44	2 November 1943	09:25	Yak-1	PQ 34 Ost 3767, 3 km (1.9 mi) southeast of Chaplynka	135	18 July 1944	18:12	Yak-7	1 km (0.62 mi) north of Turce
45	5 November 1943	10:20	Yak-1	PQ 34 Ost 66734, 20 km (12 mi) south of Kerch	136	19 July 1944	16:40	P-39	northeast of Liuboml; 3 km (1.9 mi) northeast of Liuboml
46	6 November 1943	11:55	Yak-7	PQ 34 Ost 66732, 500 m (550 yd) southeast of Eltigen	137	19 July 1944	16:41	P-39	northern edge of Liuboml
47	11 November 1943	13:45	Il-2 m.H.	PQ 34 Ost 66871, 2 km (1.2 mi) east of Katerles	138	19 July 1944	16:45	Il-2 m.H.	southeast of Liuboml; 17 km (11 mi) southeast of Liuboml
48	11 November 1943	13:50	Yak-1	PQ 34 Ost 66533, 10 km (6.2 mi) northeast of Bagerovo	139	20 July 1944	11:10	Yak-9	northwest of Liuboml; 3 km (1.9 mi) northwest of Liuboml
49	12 November 1943	08:51	Yak-1	PQ 34 Ost 66871, 1 km (0.62 mi) east of Kerch	140	21 July 1944	06:25	Yak-7	northwest of Busk; 10 km (6.2 mi) northwest of Busk
50	12 November 1943	10:47	Il-2 m.H.	PQ 34 Ost 6664, 2 km (1.2 mi) northwest of Bakssy	—	22 July 1944	—	Boston	vicinity of Strij
51	13 November 1943	05:43	Yak-1	PQ 34 Ost 66562, 3 km (1.9 mi) south of Bulganak	141	24 July 1944	18:41	Yak-9	south of Tuczana; 6 km (3.7 mi) south of Tuczana
52	13 November 1943	05:47	Yak-1	PQ 34 Ost 66642, 1 km (0.62 mi) north of Majak	—	2 August 1944	—	unknown	
53	14 November 1943	09:15	Yak-1	PQ 34 Ost 66732, 3 km (1.9 mi) east of Eltigen	142	14 August 1944	17:14	P-39	southwest of Sobotka; 5 km (3.1 mi) southwest of Sobotka
54	14 November 1943	13:50	Il-2 m.H.	PQ 34 Ost 66531, 6 km (3.7 mi) west-northwest of Katerles	143	16 August 1944	16:35	Yak-11	east-southeast of Opatow; 12 km (7.5 mi) east-southeast of Opatow
55	15 November 1943	06:15	Yak-9	PQ 34 Ost 66643, Kolonka	144	23 August 1944	17:25	Yak-7	southeast of Gaidar; 1.5 km (0.93 mi) southeast of Gaidar
56	19 November 1943	06:30	Yak-1	PQ 34 Ost 66821, 4 km (2.5 mi) west of Taman	—	23 August 1944	—	Yak	vicinity of Galatz
57	20 November 1943	06:40	Yak-9	PQ 34 Ost 66623, 3 km (1.9 mi) west of Jlitsch	145	31 August 1944	10:20	P-51	PQ 47257; 1 km (0.62 mi) south of Lövér
58	21 November 1943	07:00	Il-2 m.H.	PQ 34 Ost 66712, 3 km (1.9 mi) east of Eltigen	146	17 October 1944	10:38	Yak-11	Hosszúpályi; 3 km (1.9 mi) southeast of Hosszúpályi
59	21 November 1943	07:05	Yak-1	PQ 34 Ost 66814, 8 km (5.0 mi) southwest of Taman	147	21 October 1944	10:52	La-5	southeast of Ócsa; 6 km (3.7 mi) southeast of Ócsa
60	27 November 1943	09:48	P-39	PQ 34 Ost 47771, 7 km (4.3 mi) south of Gromovka	148	23 October 1944	15:31	Il-2 m.H.	southeast of Szolnok; 1 km (0.62 mi) southeast of Szolnok
61	27 November 1943	14:40	Yak-9	PQ 34 Ost 66732, 8 km (5.0 mi) east of Eltigen	149	23 October 1944	15:32	Il-2 m.H.	northeast of Szolnok; 1 km (0.62 mi) northeast of Szolnok
62	29 November 1943	14:21	Yak-1	PQ 34 Ost 66734, 5 km (3.1 mi) southeast of Eltigen	150	24 October 1944	09:22	Yak-7	northwest of Fehértó; 1 km (0.62 mi) northwest of Fehértó
63	30 November 1943	06:10	Yak-1	PQ 34 Ost 66792, 5 km (3.1 mi) south of Cape Takyl	151	27 October 1944	12:17	Il-2 m.H.	Bűdszentmihály; 6 km (3.7 mi) southwest of Bűdszentmihály
64	30 November 1943	13:45	Yak-1	PQ 34 Ost 66733, 3 km (1.9 mi) southwest of Eltigen	152	27 October 1944	12:21	Yak-7	Bűdszentmihály; 11 km (6.8 mi) south of Bűdszentmihály
65	1 December 1943	11:47	Yak-1	4 km (2.5 mi) southwest of Taman	153	13 November 1944	12:45	Yak-3	southeast of Jászberény; 9 km (5.6 mi) southeast of Jászberény
66	2 December 1943	06:39	Yak-1	10 km (6.2 mi) southwest of Cape Takyl	154	16 November 1944	12:39	Yak-11	5 km (3.1 mi) west of Tura
67	2 December 1943	06:48	LaGG-3	15 km (9.3 mi) east of Feodosja	155	17 November 1944	11:05	Il-2 m.H.	northwest of Jászberény; 6 km (3.7 mi) south of Jászberény
68	2 December 1943	06:55	LaGG-3	500 m (550 yd) south of Cape Takyl	156	17 November 1944	11:10	Il-2 m.H.	northwest of Jászberény; 3 km (1.9 mi) northwest of Jászberény
69	5 December 1943	07:25	Yak-7	1 km (0.62 mi) south of Kossa Tusla	157	17 November 1944	13:20	Il-2 m.H.? (Note: According to Mathews and Foreman claimed as a Yakovlev Yak-7.)	northwest of Jászberény; 3 km (1.9 mi) northwest of Jászberény
70	5 December 1943	07:32	Yak-1	5 km (3.1 mi) west of Taman	158	23 November 1944	10:40	Yak-9	southeast of Atkár; 3 km (1.9 mi) southeast of Atkár
71	5 December 1943	10:23	P-39	Kossa Tusla	159	5 December 1944	10:30	Yak-9	southeast of Hatvan; 5 km (3.1 mi) southeast of Hatvan
72	5 December 1943	13:55	Il-2 m.H.	3 km (1.9 mi) southwest of Kossa Tusla	160	9 December 1944	15:05	Il-2 m.H.	southwest of Csajág; 2 km (1.2 mi) southwest of Csajág
73	8 December 1943	07:58	Il-2 m.H.	3 km (1.9 mi) north of Katerles	161	11 December 1944	14:53	Pe-2	Balatonkenese; 5 km (3.1 mi) southeast of Lake Balaton
74	9 December 1943	11:15	Yak-1	10 km (6.2 mi) north of Taman	162	22 December 1944	09:37	Il-2 m.H.	Székesfehérvár; 6 km (3.7 mi) north of Székesfehérvár
75	11 December 1943	11:37	Yak-7	2 km (1.2 mi) northeast of Majak	163	23 December 1944	10:48	Yak-9	7 km (4.3 mi) south of Enying
76	17 December 1943	06:43	Pe-2	2 km (1.2 mi) southeast of Starotitarowskaja	164	24 December 1944	14:25	Il-2 m.H.	north of Seregélyes; 2 km (1.2 mi) north of Seregélyes
77	27 December 1943	12:08	P-39	PQ 34 Ost 66642, 2 km (1.2 mi) northeast of Majak	165	25 December 1944	12:08	Yak-9	Székesfehérvár; 9 km (5.6 mi) northwest of Székesfehérvár
78	28 December 1943	07:16	R-5	2 km (1.2 mi) northwest of Majak	166	25 December 1944	12:15	Yak-9	3 km (1.9 mi) southeast of Mór
79	29 December 1943	07:12	Yak-1	1 km (0.62 mi) west of Malikut	167	2 January 1945	11:15	La-5	eastern edge of Bodmér
80	29 December 1943	10:05	Boston	500 m (550 yd) southwest of Majak	168	2 January 1945	11:45	Yak-9	4 km (2.5 mi) east of Vereb
81	11 January 1944	11:27	P-39	north of Cape Tarchan; 5 km (3.1 mi) north of Cape Tarchan	169	4 January 1945	08:26	Il-2 m.H.	6 km (3.7 mi) south of Tarján
82	17 January 1944	06:46	LaGG-3	southeast of Bulganak; 3 km (1.9 mi) southeast of Bulganak	170	4 January 1945	08:28	Il-2 m.H.	5 km (3.1 mi) southwest of Tarján
83	21 January 1944	11:53	Il-2 m.H.	Tschurubasch; 4 km (2.5 mi) southwest of Tschurubasch	171	4 January 1945	10:41	Yak-9	6 km (3.7 mi) northwest of Bicske
84	23 January 1944	07:08	Yak-7	vicinity of Kerch; Kerch harbor	172	4 January 1945	11:12	La-5	1 km (0.62 mi) southeast of Tardos
85	23 January 1944	12:08	Yak-7	Kerch harbor	173	8 January 1945	14:13	Boston	5 km (3.1 mi) southeast of Székesfehérvár
86	24 January 1944	06:30	P-39	northern edge of Kerch	174	8 January 1945	14:18	Boston	2 km (1.2 mi) northwest of Székesfehérvár
87	25 January 1944	12:27	Yak-1	east of Bulganak; 2 km (1.2 mi) east of Bulganak	175	14 January 1945	12:11	Yak-3	2 km (1.2 mi) northwest of Mužla
88	25 January 1944	12:40	Boston	Kossa Tusla; 6 km (3.7 mi) northeast of Kossa Tusla	176	14 January 1945	14:36	Yak-3	1 km (0.62 mi) southwest of Mužla
89?	1 April 1944	09:25	LaGG-3	southeast of Feodosia; 6 km (3.7 mi) southeast of Feodosia	177	16 January 1945	12:17	La-5	3 km (1.9 mi) north of Budaörs
90	1 April 1944	09:33	LaGG-3	northeast of Feodosia; 5 km (3.1 mi) northeast of Feodosia	178	22 January 1945	13:24	La-5	10 km (6.2 mi) northeast of Székesfehérvár
91	7 April 1944	07:19	Yak-7	north of Taganaja; 20 km (12 mi) north of Taganaja	179	27 January 1945	14:45	Il-2 m.H.	7 km (4.3 mi) northwest of Adony
– Stab I. Gruppe of Jagdgeschwader 53 –
180	22 February 1945	14:00	La-5	Bart	192	21 March 1945	11:58	La-5	vicinity of Lake Balaton
181	22 February 1945	16:25	Yak-3	Bíňa	193	21 March 1945	15:30	Yak-5	6 km (3.7 mi) southwest of Felsőgalla
182	25 February 1945	10:53	Yak-9	15 km (9.3 mi) south of Zvolen	194	27 March 1945	14:15	Yak-9	3–5 km (1.9–3.1 mi) southeast of Nitra
183	8 March 1945	14:10	Il-2	6 km (3.7 mi) west of Szapolsc	195	27 March 1945	14:18	Il-2	6–8 km (3.7–5.0 mi) south of Nitra
184	11 March 1945	10:35	Yak-3	6 km (3.7 mi) southwest of Sárbogárd	196	27 March 1945	16:55	Yak-9	20–25 km (12–16 mi) southeast of Nitra
185	11 March 1945	14:05	Yak-3	9–10 km (5.6–6.2 mi) south of Siófok	197	28 March 1945	17:12	Yak-3	20 km (12 mi) south of Nitra
186	13 March 1945	10:13	Yak-7	1 km (0.62 mi) south of Pákozd	198	1 April 1945	16:05	La-7	8 km (5.0 mi) east of Nemetdiszeg
187	14 March 1945	12:07	La-5	10 km (6.2 mi) southeast of Székesfehérvár	199	5 April 1945	09:45	La-7	5 km (3.1 mi) north of Gairing
188	14 March 1945	12:11	Il-2	1 km (0.62 mi) west of Pákozd	200	8 April 1945	15:54	La-7	1–3 km (0.62–1.86 mi) east of Hainburg
189	17 March 1945	16:15	Il-2	Lake Velence	201	9 April 1945	17:20	La-7	5 km (3.1 mi) northeast of Lundenburg
190	20 March 1945	15:33	Il-2	3–4 km (1.9–2.5 mi) southeast of Székesfehérvár	202	14 April 1945	15:00	Yak-9	Stockerau
191	20 March 1945	15:41	Il-2	2–3 km (1.2–1.9 mi) southwest of Várpalota	203	16 April 1945	11:20	Yak-9	20 km (12 mi) north-northwest of Göding

=== Awards ===
- Iron Cross (1939)
  - 2nd Class (12 March 1943)
  - 1st Class (29 April 1943)
- Front Flying Clasp of the Luftwaffe for fighter pilots in Gold (26 April 1943)
- Honor Goblet of the Luftwaffe on 13 December 1943 as Leutnant and pilot (Note: According to Obermaier on 14 November 1943.)
- German Cross in Gold on 28 January 1944 as Leutnant in the 6./Jagdgeschwader 52
- Knight's Cross of the Iron Cross with Oak Leaves
  - Knight's Cross on 5 April 1944 as Leutnant of the Reserves and Staffelführer of the 6./Jagdgeschwader 52 (Note: According to Scherzer as Leutnant (war officer).)
  - 837th Oak Leaves on 17 April 1945 as Hauptmann and Gruppenkommandeur of the I./Jagdgeschwader 53 (Note: According to Scherzer as Hauptmann (war officer).)

== Publications ==
- Lipfert, Helmut; Girbig, Werner (1993). The War Diary of Hauptmann Helmut Lipfert – JG 52 on the Russian Front 1943–1945. Atglen, PA: Schiffer Publishing. ISBN 978-0-88740-446-7.
