= Heinz Ewald =

German World War II fighter pilot (1922–2002)

- Born: 1 September 1922; Zoppot, Free City of Danzig
- Died: 14 March 2002 (aged 79); Coburg, Germany
- Military career
- Allegiance: Nazi Germany
- Branch: Luftwaffe
- Service years: 1939–1945
- Rank: Leutnant (second lieutenant)
- Units: JG 52, JG 106
- Commands: 7./JG 52
- Conflicts: World War II: Eastern Front; Western Front; Operation Barbarossa
- Awards: Knight's Cross of the Iron Cross

Heinz "Esau" Ewald (1 September 1922 – 14 March 2002) was a Luftwaffe fighter ace and recipient of the Knight's Cross of the Iron Cross during World War II. Ewald was credited with 84 victories in 395 combat missions.

Born in the Free City of Danzig, Ewald joined the military service in 1941. Following fighter pilot training in 1943, he was posted to Jagdgeschwader 52 (JG 52—52nd Fighter Wing) which was fighting on the Eastern Front. Ewald claimed his first aerial victory on 12 November 1943. In February 1945, he was appointed Staffelkapitän (squadron leader) of 6. Staffel (6th squadron) of JG 52. On 20 April 1945, Ewald was awarded the Knight's Cross of the Iron Cross, one of the last pilots of JG 52 to receive this distinction. He died on 14 March 2002 in Coburg, Germany.

== Early life and career ==
Ewald was born on 1 September 1922 in Zoppot within the Free City of Danzig (now Sopot, Poland). On 1 December 1941, Ewald volunteered for military service in the Luftwaffe. After his pilot and fighter pilot training, which included flight training with the Fliegerausbildungs-Regiment 23 in Kaufbeuren, he was posted, in the fall of 1943, to 6. Staffel (6th squadron) of Jagdgeschwader 52 (JG 52—52nd Fighter Wing). (Note: Flight training in the Luftwaffe progressed through the levels A1, A2 and B1, B2, referred to as A/B flight training. A training included theoretical and practical training in aerobatics, navigation, long-distance flights and dead-stick landings. The B courses included high-altitude flights, instrument flights, night landings and training to handle the aircraft in difficult situations.) The unit was on the Eastern Front and he soon became one of the best young pilots of his group. He frequently flew as wingman to Hauptmann Gerhard Barkhorn. The 6. Staffel was under the command of Leutnant Helmut Lipfert and subordinated to II. Gruppe (2nd group) of JG 52 headed by Barkhorn.

== World War II ==
World War II in Europe had begun on Friday, 1 September 1939 when German forces invaded Poland. In June 1941, German forces had launched Operation Barbarossa, the invasion of the Soviet Union, which created the Eastern Front. On 2 November 1943, III. Gruppe of JG 52 moved to Bagerovo airfield on the Crimean peninsula where they stayed until 19 March 1944. Here on his fourth combat mission, and on his first enemy encounter, he claimed his first aerial victory on 12 November when he shot down a Yakovlev Yak-1. On 17 December, Ewald made a forced landing in his Messerschmitt Bf 109 G-6. By the end or January 1944, Ewald had increased his number of aerial victories to eleven. He was awarded the Iron Cross 2nd Class (Eisernes Kreuz zweiter Klasse) on 8 January 1944. By the end of February, his number of aerial victories claimed had increased to 17, putting him in tenth place within II. Gruppe. In early March, Ewald was awarded the Iron Cross 1st Class (Eisernes Kreuz erster Klasse).

II./JG 52 insignia

On 19 March 1944, II. Gruppe was ordered to Grammatikowo near Sovietskyi. Two days later, Ewald was shot down by anti-aircraft artillery in his Bf 109 G-6. He was promoted to Leutnant (second lieutenant) on 1 May and he received the Honor Goblet of the Luftwaffe (Ehrenpokal der Luftwaffe) on 25 May.

On 24 June, he was again shot down, this time in his Bf 109 G-6 (Werknummer 163568—factory number) during combat with Consolidated B-24 Liberator bombers southeast of Malu Roșu, Ploiești and wounded. Prior to being shot down, Ewald claimed a B-24 bomber. He made two attacks on the bomber. The first, head on, attack, damaged the bomber and separated it from its combat box. The second attack, which flown from the stern, was observed to have shot down the B-24 bomber with its left wing on fire. Flying a third attack on the bomber formation, Ewald was hit by the defensive fire of another bomber. His engine caught fire and he was forced to bail out. Fearing to be shot in his parachute by an escorting fighter, he let himself fall to approximately 1,000 meters (3,300 feet) before opening his parachute. On 30 September, II. Gruppe moved to Nagyrábé. Here on 6 October, Ewald claimed his first aerial victory following his injuries sustained on 24 June when he shot down a Yakovlev Yak-11 aircraft. He received the German Cross in Gold (Deutsches Kreuz in Gold) on 30 November.

On 2 January 1945, II. Gruppe moved to Bábolna-Puszta, a stud farm in Bábolna, Hungary. Here the next day, Ewald became an "ace-in-a-day", claiming four Yakovlev Yak-9 and a Lavochkin La-5 fighter, shot down near Gran, now Esztergom. On 18 January, II. Gruppe moved to Veszprém where they stayed until 21 March. Here the Gruppe supported the 6th Army fighting in Operation Konrad III to relieve the siege of Budapest. Ewald claimed an aerial victory over an Ilyushin Il-2 ground-attack aircraft the next day, a Douglas A-20 Havoc bomber, also named "Boston", on 20 January. On 22 January, he was credited with four La-5 fighters shot down near Stuhlweißenburg, now Székesfehérvár, followed by another La-5 on 30 January. Credited with 67 aerial victories, he was the third most successful active fighter pilot in II. Gruppe.

=== Squadron leader ===
On 15 February 1945, Ewald succeeded Oberleutnant Helmut Lipfert as Staffelkapitän (squadron leader) of 6. Staffel of JG 52. On 1 March, the Staffel was renamed the 7. Staffel. That day, he was shot down in his Bf 109 G-10/U4 (Werknummer 610964) by German anti-aircraft artillery near the airfield at Vesprém. On 28 March, II. Gruppe moved to Götzendorf an der Leitha, located approximately 25 kilometers (16 miles) southeast of Vienna, where they stayed until 1 April. Here Ewald's total number of aerial victory claims reached 78. On 1 April, the Gruppe relocated to Wien-Aspern Airfield. Two days later, Ewald made a strafing attack on Russian positions and came under attack by 12 North American P-51 Mustangs resulting in a forced landing 3 kilometers (1.9 miles) near the front line.

II. Gruppe moved to an airfield at Brünn, present-day Brno in the Czech Republic, on 14 April. There, Ewald claimed his last four aerial victories. That day, he shot down two Il-2 ground-attack aircraft and a Yak-9 fighter on 15 and 16 April, taking his total to 84. Four days later on 20 April, he was awarded the Knight's Cross of the Iron Cross (Ritterkreuz des Eisernen Kreuzes), the last pilot of II. Gruppe to receive this distinction.

On 4 May, II. Gruppe transferred to Zeltweg Air Base, located approximately 55 kilometers (34 miles) west-northwest of Graz, Austria. On 8 May at 14:30, Ewald flew from Zeltweg to Neubiberg Air Base, arriving at 15:35, his last flight and surrendered to US forces. Ewald was then held as a prisoner of war at Fürstenfeldbruck in a makeshift camp until he was released on 22 June 1945.

== Later life ==
Ewald died on 14 March 2002 at the age of 79 in Coburg, Germany.

== Summary of career ==
=== Aerial victory claims ===
According to US historian David T. Zabecki, Ewald was credited with 84 aerial victories. Spick also lists Ewald with 84 aerial victories claimed in 396 combat missions and a mission-to-claim ratio of 4.71. Mathews and Foreman, authors of Luftwaffe Aces — Biographies and Victory Claims, researched the German Federal Archives and found records for 82 aerial victory claims, including one P-51 fighter, plus 16 further unconfirmed claims. All of his confirmed victories were claimed on the Eastern Front.

Victory claims were logged to a map-reference (PQ = Planquadrat), for example "PQ 34 Ost 66562". The Luftwaffe grid map (Jägermeldenetz) covered all of Europe, western Russia and North Africa and was composed of rectangles measuring 15 minutes of latitude by 30 minutes of longitude, an area of about 360 square miles (930 km^{2}). These sectors were then subdivided into 36 smaller units to give a location area 3 km × 4 km (1.9 mi × 2.5 mi) in size.

Chronicle of aerial victories
This and the ♠ (Ace of spades) indicates those aerial victories which made Ewald an ace-in-a-day, a term which designates a fighter pilot who has shot down five or more airplanes in a single day. This and the – (dash) indicates unconfirmed aerial victory claims for which Ewald did not receive credit. This and the ? (question mark) indicates information discrepancies listed by Barbas, Prien, Stemmer, Rodeike, Balke, Bock, Mathews and Foreman.
Claim	Date	Time	Type	Location	Unit	Claim	Date	Time	Type	Location	Unit
– Claims with II. Gruppe of Jagdgeschwader 52 – Eastern Front — November – 31 December 1943
1	12 November 1943	10:27	Yak-1	PQ 34 Ost 66562, south of Bulganak vicinity of Babtschik	6./JG 52	5	29 December 1943	09:35	Yak-1	PQ 34 Ost 66613 vicinity of Cape Khroni	Stab II./JG 52
2	14 November 1943	11:55	Yak-1	PQ 34 Ost 6673	6./JG 52	6	31 December 1943	14:22	P-39	PQ 34 Ost 66522, northwest of Kesy vicinity of Nowy Swet	Stab II./JG 52
3	5 December 1943	13:35	Il-2 m.H. (Note: The "m.H." refers to an Ilyushin Il-2 with rear gunner (mit Heckschütze).)	southwest of Eltigen	Stab II./JG 52	7	31 December 1943	14:25	Yak-1	PQ 34 Ost 66531, northwest of Katerles vicinity of Mama Ruskaja	Stab II./JG 52
4	17 December 1943	10:11	Yak-1	north of Gorkom	Stab II./JG 52	8	31 December 1943	14:30	P-39	PQ 34 Ost 66531, northwest of Katerles vicinity of Mama Ruskaja	Stab II./JG 52
– Claims with II. Gruppe of Jagdgeschwader 52 – Eastern Front — 1 January – 31 December 1944
—	17 January 1944	15:00	P-39		Stab II./JG 52	27	8 June 1944	17:38	P-39	PQ 24 Ost 78523 vicinity of Iași; 25 km (16 mi) west of Tudora	6./JG 52
9	23 January 1944	12:17	P-39	PQ 34 Ost 6659; Baherove	Stab II./JG 52	—	11 June 1944	~10:00	P-51		6./JG 52
—	23 January 1944	14:30	P-39		Stab II./JG 52	28	12 June 1944	17:38	Yak-7	PQ 24 Ost 97491 vicinity of Manzar	6./JG 52
10	24 January 44	14:58	Il-2 m.H.	PQ 34 Ost 66564; Baherove	Stab II./JG 52	29? (Note: According to Mathews and Foreman this claim is unconfirmed.)	24 June 1944	09:45? (Note: According to Barbas, Mathews and Foreman claimed at 11:35.)	B-24	southeast of Malul vicinity of Buzău	6./JG 52
—	24 January 1944	~15:00	Yak-1		Stab II./JG 52	30	6 October 1944	13:01	"Yak-11"	PQ 24 Ost 17314; Nagyrábé	6./JG 52
—	25 January 1944	~15:00	Yak-1		Stab II./JG 52	—	28 October 1944	14:20	Boston		6./JG 52
11	26 January 1944	11:40	P-39	PQ 34 Ost 66643, Kerch; Baherove	Stab II./JG 52	31	31 October 1944	15:37	Il-2 m.H.	PQ 14 Ost 97252; PQ 97256 vicinity of Kecskemét	6./JG 52
12	12 February 1944	08:34	Yak-9	PQ 34 Ost 66562; Kerch	Stab II./JG 52	32	31 October 1944	15:42	La-5	PQ 14 Ost 97242; PQ 97276; 10 km (6.2 mi) southwest of Kecskemét	6./JG 52
13	12 February 1944	15:52	Yak-9	PQ 34 Ost 66614 vicinity of Majak-Bakny	Stab II./JG 52	33	1 November 1944	11:18	Yak-7	PQ 14 Ost 98894; PQ 98899 east of Nagykőrös	6./JG 52
14	25 February 1944	08:34	Yak-7	PQ 34 Ost 47772; Karankut	Stab II./JG 52	34	1 November 1944	11:23	Yak-7	PQ 14 Ost 98892; Ferihegy east of Nagykőrös	6./JG 52
15	25 February 1944	08:36	Yak-7	PQ 34 Ost 47724; PQ 47772; 30 km (19 mi) south of Dornburg	Stab II./JG 52	35	1 November 1944	14:09? (Note: According to Barbas claimed at 14:24. Mathews and Foreman present a vague time of 14:?4.)	Il-2 m.H.	PQ 14 Ost 98882; Ferihegy vicinity of Nagykőrös	6./JG 52
16	25 February 1944	15:35	Yak-7	PQ 34 Ost 47758; Karankut	Stab II./JG 52	36	13 November 1944	14:54	Yak-9	vicinity of Budaörs; 40 km (25 mi) east-southeast of Eger	6./JG 52
17	26 February 1944	12:32	P-40	PQ 34 Ost 66644; Karankut	Stab II./JG 52	—	14 November 1944	~08:00	Yak-9		6./JG 52
18	1 March 1944	08:20? (Note: According to Barbas claimed at 08:22.)	P-40	PQ 34 Ost 6664; Grammatikowo	Stab II./JG 52	37	16 November 1944	08:52	La-5	vicinity of Jászberény	6./JG 52
—	1 March 1944	~12:00	Yak-1		Stab II./JG 52	38	16 November 1944	11:46	Yak-9	vicinity of Jászberény northwest of Jászberény	6./JG 52
19	2 March 1944	13:50	Yak-1	PQ 34 Ost 66562; Grammatikowo	Stab II./JG 52	39	16 November 1944	11:51	Yak-9	vicinity of Jászberény; 20 km (12 mi) southwest of Gyöngyös	6./JG 52
20	11 March 1944	08:32	Yak-1	PQ 34 Ost 46112; Grammatikowo	Stab II./JG 52	40	16 November 1944	14:03	Yak-9	PQ 24 Ost 08373; 40 km (25 mi) north-northeast of Karcag	6./JG 52
—	11 March 1944	~12:00	Yak-1		Stab II./JG 52	41	17 November 1944	08:36	Yak-9	PQ 14 Ost 98464 vicinity of Jászberény	6./JG 52
21	13 March 1944	10:10	Yak-7	PQ 34 Ost 4613; Grammatikowo	Stab II./JG 52	42	17 November 1944	11:06	Il-2 m.H.	PQ 14 Ost 98433 vicinity of Gyöngyös	6./JG 52
—	21 March 1944	~15:00	Yak-7		Stab II./JG 52	43	5 December 1944	10:51	Yak-9	PQ 14 Ost 98412 vicinity of Hatvan	6./JG 52
— (Note: This unconfirmed claim is not listed by Prien, Stemmer, Balke and Bock.)	2 April 1944	~13:00	P-40		Stab II./JG 52	44	5 December 1944	11:04	Yak-9	PQ 14 Ost 98413 vicinity of Hatvan vicinity southeast of Hatvan	6./JG 52
22	30 May 1944	17:22	P-39	PQ 24 Ost 78642 vicinity of Huși; 10 km (6.2 mi) south of Tudora	6./JG 52	45	5 December 1944	13:34	La-5	PQ 14 Ost 98413; PQ 98417 vicinity southeast of Hatvan	6./JG 52
23	31 May 1944	18:46	P-39	PQ 24 Ost 78534 vicinity of Huși; 5 km (3.1 mi) north of Tesanrani	6./JG 52	46	5 December 1944	15:09	Yak-9	PQ 14 Ost 98444 vicinity west of Tura	6./JG 52
24	2 June 1944	14:54	Yak-7	PQ 24 Ost 78561; 15 km (9.3 mi) southwest of Tudora	6./JG 52	—	8 December 1944	~15:00	Yak-9		6./JG 52
25	3 June 1944	16:24	Il-2 m.H.	PQ 24 Ost 78674 vicinity of Huși; 8 km (5.0 mi) north of Iași	6./JG 52	47	11 December 1944	11:56	Yak-9	PQ 14 Ost 88693; PQ 88698; 20 km (12 mi) southwest of Budapest	6./JG 52
26	4 June 1944	17:21	P-39	PQ 24 Ost 78672 vicinity of Huși; 3 km (1.9 mi) east-southeast of Souleni	6./JG 52	48	14 December 1944	10:25	Il-2 m.H.	PQ 14 Ost 88752; PQ 88755; 15 km (9.3 mi) west-northwest of Stuhlweißenburg	6./JG 52
—	6 June 1944	~13:00	Yak-1		6./JG 52	49	22 December 1944	~14:00	Il-2 m.H.	vicinity of Csór	6./JG 52
—	6 June 1944	~13:00	Yak-1		6./JG 52						
– Claims with II. Gruppe of Jagdgeschwader 52 – Eastern Front – 1 January – 16 April 1945
50	2 January 1945	12:30	La-5	south of Gran	6./JG 52	68	2 February 1945	~15:00	La-5	vicinity of Stuhlweißenburg	6./JG 52
51	2 January 1945	12:30	Yak-9	south of Gran	6./JG 52	69	4 February 1945	~16:00	La-5	vicinity of Stuhlweißenburg	6./JG 52
52♠	3 January 1945	~09:00	Yak-9	south of Gran	6./JG 52	70	4 February 1945	~16:00	La-5	vicinity of Stuhlweißenburg	6./JG 52
53♠	3 January 1945	~09:00	Yak-9	south of Gran	6./JG 52	71	1 March 1945	~13:00	P-51	vicinity of Stuhlweißenburg	7./JG 52
54♠	3 January 1945	~09:00	Yak-9	south of Gran	6./JG 52	—	8 March 1945	~16:00	Il-2 m.H.	vicinity of Stuhlweißenburg	7./JG 52
55♠	3 January 1945	~14:00	La-5	vicinity of Bajna	6./JG 52	72	11 March 1945	~15:00	Yak-9		7./JG 52
56♠	3 January 1945	~14:00	Yak-9	south of Bajna	6./JG 52	73	13 March 1945	~10:00	Il-2 m.H.	vicinity of Stuhlweißenburg	7./JG 52
57	4 January 1945	~10:00	La-5	south of Gran	6./JG 52	74	13 March 1945	~16:00	La-5	vicinity of Stuhlweißenburg	7./JG 52
58	6 January 1945	13:30	La-5	vicinity of Bicske	6./JG 52	75	13 March 1945	~16:00	La-5	vicinity of Stuhlweißenburg	7./JG 52
59	6 January 1945	~11:00	La-5	vicinity of Gran	6./JG 52	76	14 March 1945	~13:00	Il-2 m.H.	vicinity of Stuhlweißenburg	7./JG 52
60	16 January 1945	~14:00	Yak-9	vicinity of Budapest	6./JG 52	77	14 March 1945	~17:00	Boston	vicinity of Stuhlweißenburg	7./JG 52
61	19 January 1945	~12:00	Il-2 m.H.	vicinity of Stuhlweißenburg	6./JG 52	78	16 March 1945	~17:00	Yak-3	vicinity of Stuhlweißenburg	7./JG 52
62	20 January 1945	~16:00	Boston	vicinity of Stuhlweißenburg vicinity of Veszprém	6./JG 52	79	5 April 1945	~11:00	Il-2 m.H.	vicinity of Vienna	7./JG 52
63	22 January 1945	13:30	La-5	vicinity of Stuhlweißenburg	6./JG 52	80	7 April 1945	~17:00	Yak-3	vicinity of Vienna	7./JG 52
64	22 January 1945	13:30	La-5	vicinity of Stuhlweißenburg	6./JG 52	81	14 April 1945	~11:00	Il-2 m.H.	vicinity of Vienna	7./JG 52
65	22 January 1945	~16:00	La-5	vicinity of Stuhlweißenburg	6./JG 52	82	14 April 1945	~13:00	Il-2 m.H.	vicinity of Vienna	7./JG 52
66	22 January 1945	~16:00	La-5	vicinity of Stuhlweißenburg	6./JG 52	83	15 April 1945	~12:00	Yak-9	vicinity of Lah	7./JG 52
67	30 January 1945	~13:00	La-5	vicinity of Budapest	6./JG 52	84	16 April 1945	~10:00	Yak-9	vicinity of Lah	7./JG 52

=== Awards ===
- Iron Cross (1939)
  - 2nd Class (8 January 1944)
  - 1st Class (2 March 1944)
- Front Flying Clasp of the Luftwaffe in Gold (22 March 1944)
- Honor Goblet of the Luftwaffe on 19 June 1944 as Unteroffizier and pilot (Note: According to Obermaier on 25 May 1944.)
- German Cross in Gold on 30 November 1944 as Leutnant in the II./Jagdgeschwader 52
- Knight's Cross of the Iron Cross on 20 April 1945 as Leutnant and pilot in the 5./Jagdgeschwader 52
