= Hans Waldmann (fighter pilot) =

German officer and fighter pilot during World War II

- Born: 24 September 1922; Braunschweig, Lower Saxony, Weimar Republic
- Died: 18 March 1945 (aged 22) near Schwarzenbek, Free State of Prussia, Nazi Germany
- Burial place: Military cemetery at Kaltenkirchen
- Military career
- Allegiance: Nazi Germany
- Branch: Luftwaffe
- Service years: 1940–1945
- Rank: Oberleutnant (first lieutenant)
- Nickname: Dackel
- Units: JG 3, JG 7, JG 52
- Commands: 3./JG 7, 4./JG 52
- Conflicts: See battles: World War II Eastern Front Invasion of Normandy Defence of the Reich †
- Awards: Knight's Cross of the Iron Cross

Hans Peter Waldmann (24 September 1922 – 18 March 1945) was a German Luftwaffe (Air Force) fighter ace and recipient of the Knight's Cross of the Iron Cross of Nazi Germany. Waldmann received the award after he had shot down 85 enemy aircraft. In total, he was credited with 134 aerial victories accumulated in 527 combat missions.

Born in Braunschweig, Waldmann volunteered for service in the Luftwaffe in 1940. After training at various pilot and fighter-pilot schools, he was posted to Jagdgeschwader 52 (JG 52—52nd Fighter Wing), operating on the Eastern Front, in August 1942. Here Waldmann fought in the aerial battles over Stalingrad, the Caucasus, the Black Sea, and the Crimea. He was credited with 84 aerial victories before briefly being transferred to the Western Front, where he was credited with one aerial victory. Back on the Eastern Front, Waldmann accumulated further victories, bringing his score to 125 victories by end of May 1944. He then fought in the skies over France after the Western Allied Invasion of Normandy, claiming seven aerial victories, before converting to the Messerschmitt Me 262 jet fighter in late 1944. Flying the Me 262, Waldmann shot down two North American P-51 Mustangs on 22 February 1945 before being killed in a mid-air collision with one of his squadron members on 18 March 1945 near Schwarzenbek, Holstein.

== Childhood, education and early career ==
Waldmann was born in Braunschweig in the Free State of Brunswick on 24 September 1922. He was the second son of Ludwig Waldmann, a bank manager, and his wife Maria. Waldmann had an older brother Paul. In 1928 he attended the Volksschule, a primary school, in the Comenius-Street. (Note: Comenius-Street—Comeniusstraße) Over Easter in 1932 he transferred to the humanities-oriented secondary school Wilhelm-Gymnasium.

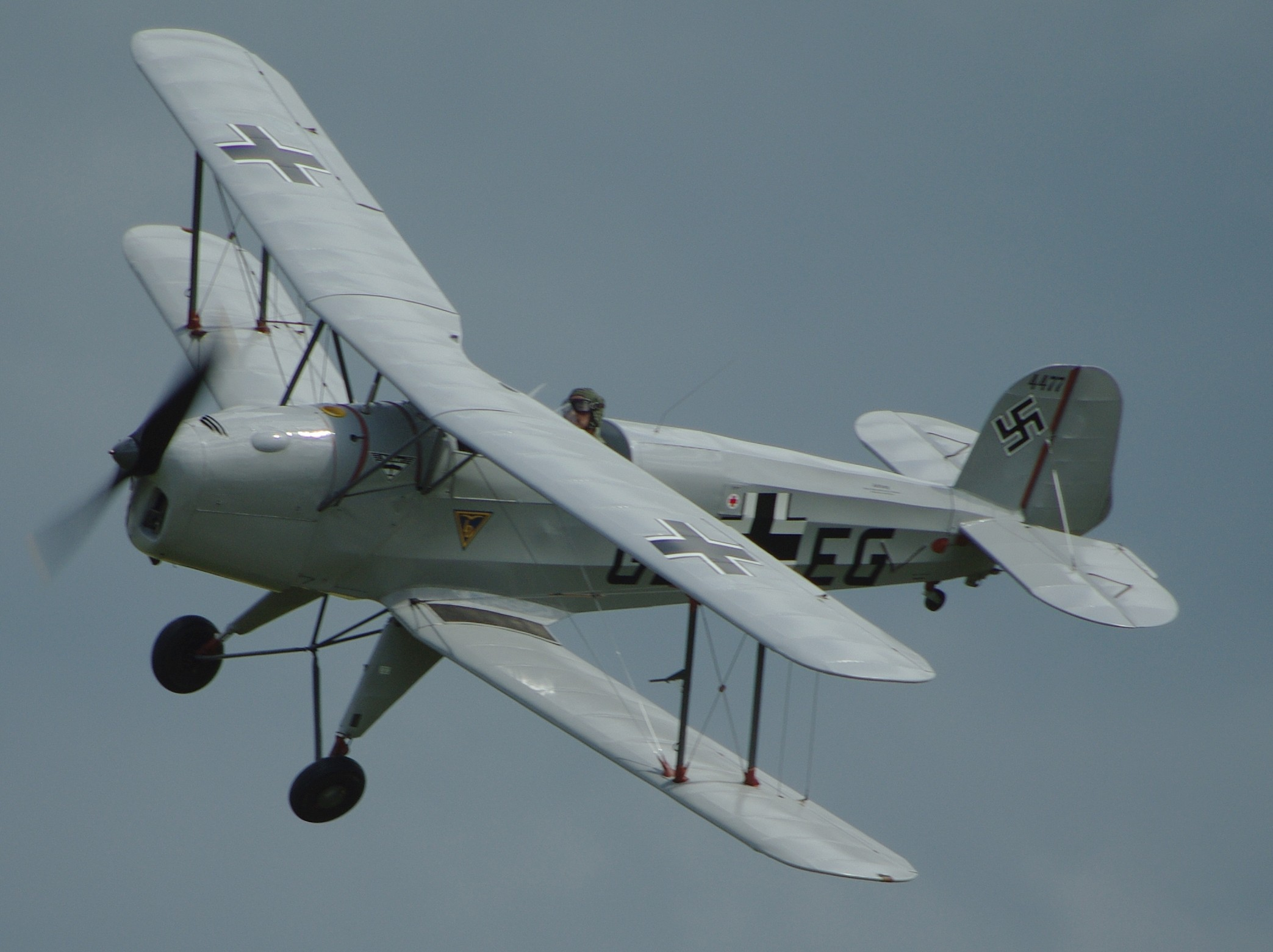
Bücker Bü 131 "Jungmann"

In 1938, Waldmann applied for a career as an officer in the Luftwaffe for the first time. Travelling to Berlin, he was deemed suitable but at the age of 16 was too young to volunteer for military service. After the outbreak of World War II, while still at school, Waldmann and his fellow students were forced into compulsory labour service (Reichsarbeitsdienst). Waldmann was assigned to the Brunswick Mechanical Engineering Institute. (Note: Brunswick Mechanical Engineering Institute—Braunschweigischen Maschinenbauanstalt—BMA) Since Waldmann had intended to study aircraft construction after his military service, he was reassigned to the Institute of Aeronautical Metrology and Flight Meteorology at the Braunschweig-Waggum airfield under the leadership of Prof. Dr. Heinrich Koppe. (Note: Institute of Aeronautical Metrology and Flight Meteorology—Institut of Luftfahrtmeßtechnik und Flugmeteorologie)

At the end of March 1940, Waldmann graduated from school with his Abitur (diploma). After this he was accepted into the Luftwaffe, two years after his initial application. Commencing in July 1940, he undertook 12 weeks of basic military training with Fliegerausbildungs-Regiment 72 (72nd Flight Training Regiment) at Fels am Wagram in Austria. Upon completion, Waldmann was transferred to the Flugzeugführerschule A/B 72 (flight school for the pilot license) at Markersdorf near Sankt Pölten in early October 1940. (Note: Flight training in the Luftwaffe progressed through the levels A1, A2 and B1, B2, referred to as A/B flight training. A training included theoretical and practical training in aerobatics, navigation, long-distance flights and dead-stick landings. The B courses included high-altitude flights, instrument flights, night landings, and training to handle the aircraft in difficult situations.) Eight days later his training group returned to Fels am Wagram because Markersdorf was overcrowded with other flight courses. Thus flight training started on the improvised airfield without hangars at Fels am Wagram. His first familiarisation flight was on 16 October 1940, in a Bücker Bü 131 "Jungmann" biplane marked "VTAF". Waldmann logged his first solo flight on 13 November 1940 at 09:17 in a Bü 131 "CGNL", landing again after six minutes of flight time. His training group returned to Markersdorf in February 1941. From here, he conducted his first cross-country flights on the Bü 131 "Jungmann" as well as the Focke-Wulf Fw 44 "Stieglitz". The majority of the cross-country flights were flown on the Gotha Go 145. From 4 April to 28 April 1941 he made the round trip from Markersdorf to Pocking, Nürnberg, Ettingshausen, Ingolstadt, Zwickau, Hildesheim, Braunschweig, Mannheim, Karlsruhe, Delmenhorst, Halberstadt and Fürth. At Ettingshausen he received instruction in formation flying and aerobatics.

By August 1941 Operation Barbarossa, the German invasion of the Soviet Union, had been underway for two months, and after completing his A/B flight training at Markersdorf Waldmann was transferred to the Jagdfliegerschule 6 (6th Fighter Pilot School) at Lachen-Speyerdorf near Neustadt an der Weinstraße. He completed the final phase of his fighter pilot training in Gleiwitz, Upper Silesia, from 3 June to 17 August 1942, before transferring to the front.

== World War II ==
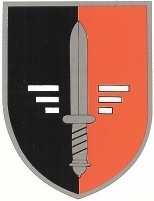
Jagdgeschwader 52 Emblem

Holding the rank of Unteroffizier, a non-commissioned officer similar in rank to sergeant, on 20 August 1942 Waldmann was tasked with shuttling new Messerschmitt Bf 109Gs from a factory at Krakau to units on the Eastern Front. Along with six other newly trained pilots, he reached Lemberg where the group was scheduled for a stop over. Bad weather closed in and Waldmann was the only one to take off before the group was grounded. Getting away at 17:55, he headed for Proskuriv. The next day he continued his journey to Uman, 230 kilometres (140 mi) south of Kiev in Ukraine. For the next few days, he was sent back and forth until he finally reached the II. Gruppe (2nd group) of Jagdgeschwader 52 (JG 52—52nd Fighter Wing) at Tusow, operating in the combat area of Stalingrad. (Note: For an explanation of Luftwaffe unit designations see Organisation of the Luftwaffe during World War II.)

On arrival, Waldmann was approached by Hauptmann (Captain) Johannes Steinhoff and asked whether he would like to fly as his wingman. Waldmann then conducted six familiarisation flights on the "Gustav", as the Bf 109 G-2 was referred to, on 30 August 1942. Flying a Bf 109 marked with a black "Chevron-2", indicating an aircraft of the Stab, he flew his first combat mission on 31 August 1942 in the vicinity of Stalingrad. Steinhoff was impressed by his first performance. At the time, Waldmann was still officially assigned to a transfer squadron, but Steinhoff decided to keep him in his Stabs-Schwarm, flight of four. Here his comrades nicknamed Waldmann "Dackel", an allusion to his last name. In German, a "Dackel", or Dachshund, is often named Waldi, a hypocoristic form of Waldmann.

=== War against the Soviet Union ===
In September 1942, II. Gruppe was ordered into the Battle of the Caucasus, supporting Army Group South on the front over the Caucasus. Opposing it was the 4th and 5th Air Armies of the Red Air Force. The Gruppe reached an airfield named Gonschtakowka located north-northeast of Mozdok on the Terek on 6 September. There, Waldmann claimed his first aerial victory over a Lavochkin-Gorbunov-Gudkov LaGG-3 fighter.

On 25 September, Waldmann's Bf 109 G-2 (Werknummer 13650—factory number) sustained minor damage in combat, resulting in a forced landing at Maikop. On 17 April 1943, Waldmann received the German Cross in Gold (Deutsches Kreuz in Gold). He made another forced landing on 7 May, this time due to engine failure of his Bf 109 G-4 at Taman. After 84 victories on 1 September 1943, Waldmann was promoted to Leutnant (second lieutenant) and assigned to Ergänzungs-Jagdgruppe Ost (Supplementary Fighter Group East). Here he was credited with the destruction of a B-17 Flying Fortress on 5 January 1944. This victory, his 85th, was actually a separation-shot—a severely damaged heavy bomber forced to separate from his combat box—which counted as an aerial victory. (Note: Separation-shot—Herausschuss) Waldmann had attacked a 28-aircraft bomber formation and severely damaged the B-17. The aerial-victory commission of Luftflotte 3 also credited the Flak-Regiment 45 of 12th Flak Brigade with this victory. Following this aerial victory, he received the Knight's Cross of the Iron Cross (Ritterkreuz des Eisernen Kreuzes) on 5 February 1944. The presentation of the award was announced by the Greater German Radio—the official radio station of the Ministry of Public Enlightenment and Propaganda—on the evening of 20 February 1944. (Note: Greater German Radio—Großdeutsche Rundfunk)

In late February 1944 Waldmann was sent back to the Crimean peninsula on the Eastern Front, where he took command of 4./JG 52 (4th Squadron of the 52nd Fighter Wing) as its Staffelkapitän (squadron leader). He succeeded Oberleutnant Heinrich Sturm who had been wounded by bomb debris in an attack on the airfield at Chersonesus at Sevastopol on 16 April. He continued his success, claiming eight aerial victories in March, and 16 in April of which eight were claimed from 5–12 April. On 11 April 1944, he claimed three aerial victories. He was the 70th Luftwaffe pilot to achieve the century mark. On 4 May 1944, 15 Bf 109s from II. Gruppe intercepted 24 Ilyushin Il-2 ground-attack aircraft from 8 GShAP (8th Guards Ground-attack Aviation Regiment) and 47 GShAP (47th Ground-attack Aviation Regiment), escorted by 23 fighter aircraft, over the Black Sea. In this encounter, pilots from II. Gruppe claimed six aerial victories, including an Il-2 and a Yakovlev Yak-7 by Waldmann, without sustaining any losses. However, Soviet records only document the loss of three Il-2 and one Yakovlev Yak-9 fighter.

Waldmann became an "ace-in-a-day" on 7 May 1944, claiming six aerial victories over the Sevastopol combat area. Two Staffeln (squadrons) of the II./JG 52 were transferred to Huși at the Prut River on 27 May 1944. Here Waldmann claimed his final four victories on the Eastern Front, taking his total to 125 aerial victories claimed. On 1 June, Gruppenkommandeur (group commander) Major Gerhard Barkhorn was ordered to transfer one Staffel to the west in Defence of the Reich. Barkhorn selected Waldmann's 4. Staffel which was officially assigned to the II./Jagdgeschwader 3 "Udet" (JG 3—3rd Fighter Wing). There, the Staffel was later renamed and became the 8. Staffel of JG 3. At the time, II./JG 3 was under the command of Hauptmann Hans-Ekkehard Bob, and later by Hauptmann Herbert Kutscha.

=== Invasion of Normandy ===
The Invasion of Normandy, which started on the early morning of 6 June 1944, was in full swing by the time Waldmann's Staffel arrived in France in early July. The Western Allies were already breaking out of Normandy in what was codenamed Operation Cobra. II./JG 3 "Udet" (2nd Group of the 3rd Fighter Wing) was stationed at Nogent-le-Roi, roughly 50 kilometres (31 mi) southwest of Paris. The Gruppe was tasked with ground support missions. In one of these missions against the Allied invasion forces, Waldmann claimed to have damaged a P-51 Mustang on 31 July 1944. He was credited with the destruction of numerous trucks during ground support missions over the period of 2–5 August 1944.

Waldmann claimed his first aerial victory in the west, his 126th in total, over a B-24 Liberator on 6 August 1944. Waldmann had taken off at 11:43 on a free-fighter sweep mission against heavy bombers. His unit spotted a formation of B-24s after 45 minutes flying time. Waldmann attacked and with his first pass at an altitude of 5,000 metres (16,000 ft) had hit one of the B-24 between the two starboard engines, which immediately set the bomber on fire. The B-24 was observed to crash 3 kilometres (1.9 mi) southeast of Méry. His final tally for August was seven Allied planes, including the B-24, one Auster on 7 August, and five P-47 Thunderbolts (two on 14 August, two on 18 August and one on 19 August). This took his total to 132 aerial victory claims.

=== Flying the Messerschmitt Me 262 and death ===
On 25 November 1944, II. Gruppe was detached from JG 3. The Gruppe was converted to fly the Messerschmitt Me 262 "Stormbird" jet fighter and became the I. Gruppe of Jagdgeschwader 7 (JG 7—7th Fighter Wing), the first operational jet fighter wing. Conversion training was held at Landsberg-Lech Airfield and Kaltenkirchen in December 1944. The pilots first learned to fly the Siebel Si 204 and Messerschmitt Bf 110 to familiarize themselves with the characteristics of a twin-engine aircraft. In consequence, Waldmann was transferred to 3./JG 7, now flying the "Stormbird", as its Staffelführer (squadron leader on probation).

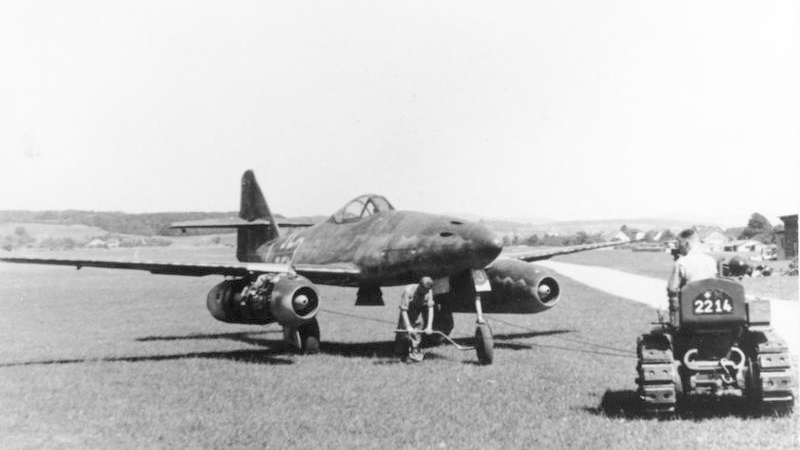
Me 262 A, circa 1944

Together with his wingman‚ Oberfähnrich Günter Schrey, Waldmann took off at 11:39 on 22 February 1945 from Oranienburg on an offensive counter-air mission against inbound Allied heavy bombers. (Note: Offensive counter air—Freie Jagd) The Anglo-American attack was codenamed Operation Clarion. About 20 minutes into the flight, roughly 30 kilometres (19 mi) west of Berlin, they spotted an American P-51 Mustang flying at 7,000 metres (23,000 ft). Closing fast, Waldmann shot down the Mustang at 12:02 before proceeding west for Magdeburg. Near Oschersleben they spotted another Mustang at 3,800 metres (12,500 ft). Waldmann shot it down at 12:17, achieving his 134th and final aerial victory. The Mustang was observed crashing into a forest 25 kilometres (16 mi) northeast of the Brocken, the highest peak of the Harz mountain range.

On Sunday, 18 March 1945, the lower cloud ceiling at Kaltenkirchen was less than 600 metres (2,000 ft) and most of the time between 80–100 metres (260–330 ft), while the upper cloud ceiling was at 6,000 metres (20,000 ft), rendering flight conditions outside the official operational specification for the Me 262. The jet was not fully cleared for instrument flight, mandating a lower cloud ceiling of more than 800 metres (2,600 ft). Major Erich Rudorffer, Gruppenkommandeur of the I./JG 7, was attending a meeting at the Luftgaukommando in Hamburg-Blankenese, when Oberleutnant Hans Grünberg, the most senior officer on duty and Staffelkapitän of the 1st Staffel, received the order from Major Richter, the Ia (operations officer), to engage inbound heavy bombers. Grünberg initially argued that weather conditions prohibited a safe takeoff but Reichsmarschall Hermann Göring intervened and ordered the jets to engage the enemy.

The order resulted in the death of both Waldmann and his wingman Schrey on the following mission. Waldmann was killed following a mid-air collision with Leutnant Hans-Dieter Weihs shortly after takeoff, and Schrey was killed in combat with US fighters. Mindful of the direct order of the Reichsmarschall, Oberleutnant Grünberg (1st Staffel), Oberleutnant Fritz Stehle (2nd Staffel) and Waldmann (3rd Staffel) had decided that each of them would lead a flight of four Me 262s, taking off and flying around for an hour before returning without trying to engage the enemy. Grünberg's Schwarm took off first followed by Stehle's Schwarm. Waldmann chose Weihs, as the most experienced pilot trained in instrument flight, to lead the Schwarm, while Schrey once again served as Waldmann's wingman. Waldmann's Me 262 A-1 "Yellow 3" (Werknummer 117097—factory number) took off at 12:24 and Weihs ordered the Schwarm to form a close formation, flying wing tip to wing tip.

Only three Me 262s took off; Flieger Gerhard Reiher's Me 262 had experienced engine failure. Four minutes into the flight, having travelled roughly 50 kilometres (31 mi) and flying at less than 800 metres (2,600 ft) above the ground, Weihs' aircraft experienced a heavy blow from below after Waldmann collided with him. His jet in an unrecoverable spin, Weihs bailed out and came down near the Hamburg-Berlin railroad tracks. The airfield at Kaltenkirchen was immediately informed. Waldmann and Schrey were initially believed missing. Waldmann's body was recovered the next day near Schwarzenbek, roughly 1 kilometre (0.62 mi) away from the crash site of his Me 262. Apparently he had managed to bail out but failed to deploy his parachute in time, although the injuries sustained during the crash with Weihs' aircraft may have already been fatal as the recovery party found Waldmann with his upper forehead smashed. Schrey was also found dead. He had bailed out with his parachute, but his body was found riddled by machine-gun bullets.

The airmen were buried with full military honours, including a Me 262 flypast, at the cemetery in Kaltenkirchen. Waldmann's successor as Staffelkapitän, Oberleutnant Walter Wagner, accompanied Waldmann's mother from Braunschweig to Kaltenkirchen for the funeral. A number of wreaths were laid on his grave, the largest sent by the Reichsmarschall. Waldmann was recommended for the Oak Leaves to the Knight's Cross, but the recommendation was either not approved or not finalized before the end of the war.

== Summary of career ==
=== Aerial victory claims ===
According to US historian David T. Zabecki, Waldmann was credited with 134 aerial victories. Authors Bracke and Obermaier also list Waldmann with 134 aerial victories, claimed in 527 combat missions, 10 on the Western Front and 124 on the Eastern Front. His tally on the Eastern Front includes five bombers, 86 fighters and 33 Il-2 Sturmovik ground-attack aircraft. On the Western Front he claimed seven fighters, two four-engined bombers and one observation aircraft. He also flew a number of ground attack missions, destroying 33 various vehicles and eight heavy transports. In addition, Spick lists him with a mission-to-claim ratio of 3.93. Mathews and Foreman, authors of Luftwaffe Aces — Biographies and Victory Claims, researched the German Federal Archives and found records for 131 aerial victory claims, plus seven further unconfirmed claims. This figure of confirmed claims includes 121 aerial victories on the Eastern Front and 10 on the Western Front, including two four-engined bombers and two victories with the Me 262 jet fighter.

Victory claims were logged to a map-reference (PQ = Planquadrat), for example "PQ 28472". The Luftwaffe grid map (Jägermeldenetz) covered all of Europe, western Russia and North Africa and was composed of rectangles measuring 15 minutes of latitude by 30 minutes of longitude, an area of about 360 square miles (930 km^{2}). These sectors were then subdivided into 36 smaller units to give a location area 3 km × 4 km (1.9 mi × 2.5 mi) in size.

Chronicle of aerial victories
This and the ♠ (Ace of spades) indicates those aerial victories which made Waldmann an ace-in-a-day, a term which designates a fighter pilot who has shot down five or more airplanes in a single day. This and the – (dash) indicates unconfirmed aerial victory claims for which Waldmann did not receive credit. This along with the * (asterisk) indicates an Herausschuss (separation shot)—a severely damaged heavy bomber forced to separate from his combat box which was counted as an aerial victory. This and the ? (question mark) indicates information discrepancies listed by Barbas, Bracke, Prien, Stemmer, Rodeike, Bock, Mathews and Foreman.
Claim	Date	Time	Type	Location	Mission	Claim	Date	Time	Type	Location	Mission
– II. Gruppe of Jagdgeschwader 52 –
1	7 September 1942	08:18	LaGG-3	3 km (1.9 mi) north of Makowkin	6	13	30 November 1942	13:10	Il-2	3 km (1.9 mi) southwest of Usawijnskij	75
—	7 September 1942	—	I-153			14	1 December 1942	09:04	P-40	PQ 39271, eastern bank of Don River	76
2	9 September 1942	14:09	LaGG-3	8 km (5.0 mi) northeast of Makowkin vicinity of Malgobek	10	15	2 December 1942	12:17	Il-2	5 km (3.1 mi) west of Jelschanka; 10 km (6.2 mi) south of Stalingrad	77
3	10 September 1942	14:06	LaGG-3	10 km (6.2 mi) northeast of Wosnessnokaja	11	16	8 December 1942	09:46	Yak-1	5 km (3.1 mi) north of Nowy Jereskij; 35 km (22 mi) north of Shutow	78
4	16 September 1942	16:21	LaGG-3	15 km (9.3 mi) northeast of Kalinowskaja	19	17	8 December 1942	09:59	P-40	PQ 39491, Nowy-Kut	78
5	18 September 1942	14:15	I-153	19 km (12 mi) northeast of Kalinowskaja	21	—	8 December 1942	—	Yak-1	vicinity of Stalingrad	
6	25 September 1942	14:15	LaGG-3	PQ 95763, Tuapse	28	—	17 December 1942	—	P-40	vicinity of Kotelnikovo	
7	22 October 1942	10:00	I-153	5 km (3.1 mi) north of Maikop; 30 km (19 mi) north of Tuapse	46	18	18 December 1942	10:34	Yak-1	6 km (3.7 mi) east of Gromoslawka	90
8	30 October 1942	12:35	Yak-1	2 km (1.2 mi) southeast of Lazarevskoye	55	19	19 December 1942	13:16	La-5	1 km (0.62 mi) southwest of Haltepunkt 55; 45 km (28 mi) south of Stalingrad	92
9	2 November 1942	11:57	LaGG-3	2 km (1.2 mi) southeast of Lazarevskoye	58	20	22 December 1942	10:50	La-5	10 km (6.2 mi) north of Vasilyevka; 20 km (12 mi) north of Shutow	95
10	3 November 1942	11:30	Pe-2	8 km (5.0 mi) west of Sochi	60	21	28 December 1942	12:57	La-5	5 km (3.1 mi) southwest of Kotelnikovo	99
11	12 November 1942	14:10	I-153	3 km (1.9 mi) southwest of Intjuk	64	22	14 January 1943	14:32	Il-2	PQ 17263, Domskoje	108
12	28 November 1942	12:05	Il-2	5 km (3.1 mi) southwest of Aleksejewa south of Bassargeno	73	23	25 January 1943	11:52	La-5	PQ 08681, 5 km (3.1 mi) southwest of Ssaraiski	111
– 6. Staffel of Jagdgeschwader 52 –
24	11 February 1943	08:05	I-16	PQ 34 Ost 7542, 3 km (1.9 mi) south of Novorossiysk	118	55	11 July 1943	12:00	Boston	PQ 34 Ost 75492, 8 km (5.0 mi) west of Gelendzhik; Black Sea, 10 km (6.2 mi) west of Gelendzhik	256
25	12 February 1943	05:59	I-153	PQ 34 Ost 75424, 4 km (2.5 mi) east of Novorossiysk	120	56	21 July 1943	09:58	Yak-1	PQ 34 Ost 76832, 3 km (1.9 mi) southwest of Anastasiewskaja	280
26	12 February 1943	10:06	I-153	PQ 34 Ost 85273, 10 km (6.2 mi) south of Iljskaja vicinity of Derbentskaja	121	57	21 July 1943	16:30	Yak-1	PQ 34 Ost 65261, 20 km (12 mi) west of Anapa; Black Sea, west of Anapa	282
27	12 February 1943	10:09	I-153	PQ 34 Ost 85452, 5 km (3.1 mi) southwest of Iljskaja	121	58	22 July 1943	10:03	Yak-1	PQ 34 Ost 76894, 6 km (3.7 mi) west of Kijewskoje	283
28	12 February 1943	14:36	I-153	PQ 34 Ost 85454, Kobylin	122	59	22 July 1943	16:24	Il-2	PQ 34 Ost 76894, 7 km (4.3 mi) northwest of Krymskaja	285
29	13 February 1943	08:35? (Note: According to Mathews and Foreman claimed at 08:30.)	I-153	PQ 34 Ost 85171, 15 km (9.3 mi) east of Krymskaja vicinity of Usun	123	60	26 July 1943	06:16	Yak-1	PQ 34 Ost 75114, 15 km (9.3 mi) west of Anapa; Black Sea, 20 km (12 mi) west-northwest of Anapa	290
30	19 February 1943	12:15	Yak-4	PQ 34 Ost 85373, 6 km (3.7 mi) south of Gelendzhik	133	61	26 July 1943	06:31	Yak-1	PQ 34 Ost 75392, 10 km (6.2 mi) southeast of Cape Utrish; Black Sea, southeast of Anapa	290
31	22 February 1943	11:05	I-153	PQ 34 Ost 75224, 10 km (6.2 mi) southwest of Krymskaja vicinity of Gretschesk	138	62	30 July 1943	06:32	Il-2 m.H. (Note: The "m.H." refers to an Ilyushin Il-2 with rear gunner (mit Heckschütze).)	PQ 34 Ost 75234, 4 km (2.5 mi) east of Moldowanskaja vicinity of Kraskj-Oktjabrj	299
32	25 February 1943	14:58	Il-2	PQ 34 Ost 86761, 5 km (3.1 mi) northeast of Fedorovskaja	143	63	4 August 1943	11:32	Il-2 m.H.	PQ 35 Ost 61451, 5 km (3.1 mi) northeast of Belgorod; 15 km (9.3 mi) northeast of Belgorod	312
33	1 March 1943	15:15	LaGG-3	PQ 34 Ost 76814, 5 km (3.1 mi) northeast of Kutschanskaja vicinity of Kraskj-Oktjabrj	149	64	4 August 1943	13:47	La-5	PQ 35 Ost 61274, 12 km (7.5 mi) north of Belgorod; 20 km (12 mi) north-northeast of Belgorod	313
34	29 April 1943	13:26? (Note: According to Mathews and Foreman claimed at 13:25.)	Il-2	PQ 34 Ost 85142, 5 km (3.1 mi) south of Mingrelskaja	151	65	4 August 1943	14:00	La-5	PQ 35 Ost 61593, 2 km (1.2 mi) south of Shorawtowka	313
35	30 April 1943	17:22	P-39	PQ 34 Ost 75432, 15 km (9.3 mi) east of Novorossiysk vicinity of Achonk	153	66	4 August 1943	17:18	Yak-1	PQ 35 Ost 61333, 5 km (3.1 mi) northwest of Belgorod; 10 km (6.2 mi) north of Tomarowka	314
36	30 April 1943	17:28	LaGG-3	PQ 34 Ost 85171, 10 km (6.2 mi) southwest of Abinsky vicinity of Usun	153	67	5 August 1943	06:56? (Note: According to Mathews and Foreman claimed at 06:54.)	Yak-1	PQ 35 Ost 61382, 4 km (2.5 mi) northwest of Orlovka	317
37	3 May 1943	08:25? (Note: According to Mathews and Foreman claimed at 08:23.)	P-39	PQ 34 Ost 85143, 5 km (3.1 mi) west of Abinsky southeast of Krymsk	158	68	6 August 1943	10:35	La-5	PQ 35 Ost 61524, 5 km (3.1 mi) east of Schtschetinowskaja	323
38	3 May 1943	17:02	Yak-1	PQ 34 Ost 75164, 10 km (6.2 mi) south of Krymskaja	159	69	6 August 1943	10:52	Yak-1	PQ 35 Ost 61443, 4 km (2.5 mi) northwest of Belgorod	323
39	4 May 1943	15:08? (Note: According to Mathews and Foreman claimed at 15:02.)	Yak-1	PQ 34 Ost 75273, 20 km (12 mi) west of Novorossiysk	161	70	7 August 1943	09:12? (Note: According to Mathews and Foreman claimed at 07:22.)	La-5	PQ 35 Ost 61594, 3 km (1.9 mi) east of Mikojanowka	324
40	7 May 1943	07:49	Yak-1	PQ 34 Ost 75291, Neberdshajewskaja	165	71	7 August 1943	15:12	Il-2 m.H.	PQ 35 Ost 61473, 2 km (1.2 mi) west of Tawrowo; 5 km (3.1 mi) south of Belograd	325
41	8 May 1943	07:00	Yak-1	PQ 34 Ost 75434, 20 km (12 mi) north of Karbardinka	167	72	8 August 1943	08:18	La-5	PQ 35 Ost 61562, 3 km (1.9 mi) southeast of Kawaraowija	327
42	9 May 1943	08:46	Yak-1	PQ 34 Ost 75431, 7 km (4.3 mi) east of Novorossiysk; 3 km (1.9 mi) southeast of Novorossiysk	169	73	8 August 1943	08:21	Yak-1	PQ 35 Ost 61534, 4 km (2.5 mi) south of Schepilinskij vicinity of Schepilinski	327
43	24 May 1943	09:58	Yak-1	PQ 34 Ost 65431, 30 km (19 mi) southwest of Anapa	196	74	8 August 1943	18:21	Boston	7 km (4.3 mi) northwest of Krassnopawlowka; 10 km (6.2 mi) north of Krassnopawlowka	329
44	26 May 1943	10:11	LaGG-3	3 km (1.9 mi) west of Kijewskoje	202	75	10 August 1943	08:56	Pe-2	PQ 35 Ost 61572, 3 km (1.9 mi) east of Soloschew; 10 km (6.2 mi) east of Zolochev	335
45	26 May 1943	11:17	Spitfire	PQ 34 Ost 75233, Kijewskoje west of Krymsk	203	76	12 August 1943	11:27	La-5	PQ 35 Ost 51543, 6 km (3.7 mi) northeast of Achtyrskaja	339
46	28 May 1943	10:46	Yak-1	PQ 34 Ost 86744, 5 km (3.1 mi) southeast of Troitzkaja	207	77	13 August 1943	18:39	La-5	PQ 35 Ost 41492, 2 km (1.2 mi) south of Boromlije	344
47	30 May 1943	07:32	Il-2 m.H.	PQ 34 Ost 75114, 10 km (6.2 mi) west of Anapa; Black Sea, 20 km (12 mi) west-northwest of Anapa	211	78	14 August 1943	10:40	La-5	PQ 35 Ost 51153, 10 km (6.2 mi) south of Miropolije	346
48	30 May 1943	07:36	Il-2 m.H.	PQ 34 Ost 75171, 20 km (12 mi) west of Anapa; Black Sea, southwest of Anapa	211	79	20 August 1943	05:50	Il-2	PQ 35 Ost 51713, 2 km (1.2 mi) south of Iwanowka	357
49	3 June 1943	08:24	P-39	PQ 34 Ost 85113, Krymskaja east of Krymsk	222	80	20 August 1943	05:55? (Note: According to Mathews and Foreman claimed at 05:54.)	Il-2	PQ 35 Ost 51771, 5 km (3.1 mi) west of Krassno-Kut	357
50	6 June 1943	08:07	Yak-1	PQ 34 Ost 75262, 5 km (3.1 mi) southwest of Krymskaja south of Krymsk	227	81	21 August 1943	13:28? (Note: According to Mathews and Foreman claimed at 18:21.)	Il-2 m.H.	PQ 35 Ost 51541, 10 km (6.2 mi) northeast of Achtyrskaja	363
51	6 June 1943	08:16	Yak-1	PQ 34 Ost 85144, 5 km (3.1 mi) southwest of Abinsky	227	82	24 August 1943	12:38	Il-2 m.H.	PQ 34 Ost 88422, 3 km (1.9 mi) west of Gustavfeld; 20 km (12 mi) south of Jalisawehino	368
52	8 June 1943	12:08	LaGG-3	PQ 34 Ost 75173, 15 km (9.3 mi) west of Anapa; Black Sea, southwest of Anapa	229	83	24 August 1943	15:12	Il-2 m.H.	PQ 34 Ost 88263, 5 km (3.1 mi) west of Knitschewo; 10 km (6.2 mi) east of Marinowka	369
53	8 June 1943	12:13	Yak-1	PQ 34 Ost 75393, 15 km (9.3 mi) west of Anapa; Black Sea, southeast of Anapa	229	84	30 August 1943	14:44	Il-2 m.H.	PQ 34 Ost 88463, 1 km (0.62 mi) north of Makeyevka; 25 km (16 mi) south-southeast of Jalisawehino	383
54	25 June 1943	08:24	Il-2 m.H.	PQ 34 Ost 75461, 5 km (3.1 mi) southwest of Kabardinka; Black Sea, 5 km (3.1 mi) west of Kabardinka	241						
– 2. Staffel of Ergänzungs-Jagdgruppe Ost –
85*	5 January 1944	10:35	Flying Fortress	France	385						
– 6. Staffel of Jagdgeschwader 52 –
86	2 March 1944	13:59? (Note: According to Mathews and Foreman claimed at 13:54.)	Yak-7	east of Cape Tarchan vicinity of Cape Tarchan	389	99	11 April 1944	10:46	Yak-7	northeast of Dzhankoy	424
87? (Note: According to Mathews and Foreman this claim is unconfirmed.)	13 March 1944	08:42	Il-2 m.H.	east of Feodosia	395	100	11 April 1944	10:54	Yak-7	south of Dzhankoy	424
88	13 March 1944	08:45	Il-2 m.H.	southeast of Feodosia	395	101	12 April 1944	10:53	Yak-7	north-northeast of Sarabus	426
89	13 March 1944	10:24	Boston	Lake Tschokrak	396	102	13 April 1944	08:29	Yak-7	north of Vasilkov	430
90	17 March 1944	09:14	Il-2 m.H.	southeast of Feodosia	399	103	18 April 1944	15:15	Yak-7	south of Katscha	438
91	17 March 1944	09:17	Il-2 m.H.	southeast of Feodosia	399	104	18 April 1944	17:01	P-39	north of Mamaschai	439
92	17 March 1944	09:32	Yak-7	Cape Tschuda	399	105	19 April 1944	17:02	Yak-1	east of Kadykowka; 10 km (6.2 mi) south of Sevastopol	440
93?	22 March 1944	14:03	Yak-7	east of Cape Worsowka	401	106	22 April 1944	11:36	Il-2 m.H.	Black Sea, west-southwest of Chersones	445
94	5 April 1944	17:24	Il-2 m.H.	northeast of Kertsch	413	107	22 April 1944	11:37	Yak-7	Black Sea, west-southwest of Chersones	445
95?	5 April 1944	17:25	Yak-1	west of Kolonka	413	108	25 April 1944	14:07	Yak-7	north of Balaklava; 10 km (6.2 mi) south of Sevastopol	447
96	7 April 1944	12:51	P-40	Black Sea, south-southeast of Cape Takyl	417	109	25 April 1944	14:13	Il-2 m.H.	southeast of Balaklava; Black Sea, 10 km (6.2 mi) south of Sevastopol	447
97	10 April 1944	17:42	Il-2 m.H.	northeast of Tomaschewska	422	110	4 May 1944	06:40	Yak-7	northwest of Chersones; Black Sea, 20 km (12 mi) west of Sevastopol	448
98	11 April 1944	06:58	Yak-7	west of Dzhankoy	423	111	4 May 1944	06:46	Il-2 m.H.	northwest of Chersones; Black Sea, 35 km (22 mi) west of Sevastopol	448
– 4. Staffel of Jagdgeschwader 52 – Eastern Front
112	6 May 1944	11:27	Yak-7	north of Belbek	449	119♠	7 May 1944	17:54	Yak-7	south of Sevastopol	452
113	6 May 1944	11:32	Yak-7	east of Belbek vicinity of Sevastopol	449	120♠	7 May 1944	17:56	Il-2 m.H.	north-northwest of Balaklava; 10 km (6.2 mi) south of Sevastopol	452
114	6 May 1944	11:40	Yak-7	south of Belbek vicinity of Sevastopol	449	121	8 May 1944	15:24	P-39	south of Balaklava; Black Sea, 10 km (6.2 mi) south of Sevastopol	453
115♠	7 May 1944	09:29	P-39	north-northwest of Balaklava; 10 km (6.2 mi) south of Sevastopol	450	122	30 May 1944	15:15	Il-2 m.H.	7 km (4.3 mi) north of Iași	484
116♠	7 May 1944	13:21	Yak-7	northwest of Balaklava; 10 km (6.2 mi) south of Sevastopol	451	123	31 May 1944	12:14	P-39	12 km (7.5 mi) northeast of Iași	487
117♠	7 May 1944	13:28	Il-2 m.H.	southeast of Balaklava; Black Sea, 10 km (6.2 mi) south of Sevastopol	451	124	31 May 1944	12:16	P-39	18 km (11 mi) northeast of Iași; 15 km (9.3 mi) southeast of Tuapse	487
118♠	7 May 1944	13:36	Il-2 m.H.	southwest of Kadykowka; Black Sea, 10 km (6.2 mi) south of Sevastopol	451	125	31 May 1944	16:32	Il-2 m.H.	5 km (3.1 mi) north of Iași	488
– 4. Staffel of Jagdgeschwader 52 – Western Front
—	31 July 1944	—	P-51			128	14 August 1944	16:45	P-47	PQ 04 Ost N/BC-7; Senonches	515
126	6 August 1944	12:31	B-24	PQ 05 Ost UE-8 north of Paris; Méry, France	509	129	14 August 1944	16:47	P-47	PQ 04 Ost N/BC-8; Thimert-Gâtelles	515
127	7 August 1944	15:06	Auster	PQ 05 Ost CS-3; Landivy north of Fougères	511						
– 8. Staffel of Jagdgeschwader 3 –
130	18 August 1944	14:06	P-47	PQ 04 Ost N/BD-2 northeast of Chartres	520	132	19 August 1944	09:10	P-47	PQ 05 Ost UA-6 vicinity of Lisieux	521
131	18 August 1944	14:12	P-47	PQ 04 Ost N/BD-1 northeast of Chartres	520						
– 3. Staffel of Jagdgeschwader 7 –
133	22 February 1945	12:02	P-51	west of Berlin	527	134	22 February 1945	12:17	P-51	northeast of the Brocken	527

=== Awards ===
- Iron Cross (1939)
  - 2nd Class (25 September 1942)
  - 1st Class (11 November 1942)
- Front Flying Clasp of the Luftwaffe for Fighter Pilots in Gold (1 February 1943)
- Honour Goblet of the Luftwaffe on 15 March 1943 as Unteroffizier and pilot (Note: According to Bracke and Obermaier on 10 March 1943.)
- German Cross in Gold on 17 April 1943 as Unteroffizier in the 6./Jagdgeschwader 52
- Knight's Cross of the Iron Cross on 5 February 1944 as Feldwebel and pilot in the 6./Jagdgeschwader 52

Waldmann may have been awarded a posthumous Knight's Cross of the Iron Cross with Oak Leaves (Ritterkreuz des Eisernen Kreuzes mit Eichenlaub). (Note: According to Von Seemen Oak Leaves on 1 March 1945. Thomas also states this and adds that Waldmann received the Oak Leaves as Oberleutnant and Staffelkapitän of the 3./Jagdgeschwader 7 "Hindenburg". He had been nominated for the Oak Leaves on 21 June 1944 after 521 combat missions and at the time credited with 132 aerial victories.) Oberst Nicolaus von Below processed such a request between 20 April 1945 and 2 May 1945, although no official proof exists.
