= Csór =

- Location of Fejér county in Hungary

- Location of Csór
- Coordinates: 47.20390°N 18.25701°E
- Country: Hungary
- County: Fejér

Area
  - Total: 41.49 km^{2} (16.02 sq mi)

Population (2004)
  - Total: 1,700
  - Density: 40.97/km^{2} (106.1/sq mi)
- Time zone: UTC+1 (CET)
  - Summer (DST): UTC+2 (CEST)
- Postal code: 8041
- Area code: 22
- Website: www.csor.hu

Csór is a village in Fejér county, Hungary.
