= Willi Nemitz =

German World War II fighter pilot

- Born: 1 November 1910; Greifenhagen, Kingdom of Prussia, German Empire
- Died: 11 April 1943 (aged 32); Anapa, Krasnodar Krai, RFSR
- Cause of death: Killed in action
- Military career
- Allegiance: Nazi Germany
- Branch: Luftwaffe
- Rank: Leutnant (second lieutenant)
- Nickname: Altvater (grandfather)
- Unit: JG 52
- Commands: 5./JG 52, 6./JG 52
- Conflicts: See battles World War II: Eastern Front; Operation Barbarossa; Operation Blue; Battle of the Caucasus †
- Awards: Knight's Cross of the Iron Cross

Willi Nemitz (1 November 1910 – 11 April 1943) was a German Luftwaffe military aviator and fighter ace during World War II. He was one of the oldest operational fighter pilots and was credited with 81 aerial victories, all of which claimed on the Eastern Front, achieved in approximately 500 combat missions.

Born in Greifenhagen in Pomerania, Nemitz joined the military service in the Luftwaffe. Following flight training, he was posted to Jagdgeschwader 52 (JG 52—52nd Fighter Wing) in 1940. During Operation Barbarossa, the German invasion of the Soviet Union, he claimed his first aerial victory on 3 July 1941. In November 1942, he was made Staffelführer, temporary command position, of 5. Staffel (5th squadron) of JG 52. He then commanded 6. Staffel of JG 52 and was awarded the Knight's Cross of the Iron Cross on 24 March 1943. He was shot down and killed in action on 11 April 1943 near Anapa during the Battle of the Caucasus.

== Career ==
Nemitz was born on 1 November 1910 in Greifenhagen in Pomerania, at the time in the Province of Pomerania, a province of the Kingdom of Prussia within the German Empire, present-day Gryfino in northwestern Poland. He was the son of a farmer. Following flight training, (Note: Flight training in the Luftwaffe progressed through the levels A1, A2 and B1, B2, referred to as A/B flight training. A training included theoretical and practical training in aerobatics, navigation, long-distance flights and dead-stick landings. The B courses included high-altitude flights, instrument flights, night landings and training to handle the aircraft in difficult situations.) he was posted to 5. Staffel (5th squadron) of Jagdgeschwader 52 (JG 52—52nd Fighter Wing) in 1940. The Staffel was commanded by Oberleutnant August-Wilhelm Schumann and subordinated to II. Gruppe of JG 52 which was headed by Hauptmann Wilhelm Ensslen and fought in the Battle of Britain. On 2 November, Ensslen was killed in action and replaced by Hauptmann Erich Woitke.

=== Operation Barbarossa ===
In preparation of Operation Barbarossa, the German invasion of the Soviet Union, II. Gruppe of JG 52, without a period of replenishment in Germany, was ordered to airfields close to the German-Soviet demarcation line. While the Gruppenstab (group headquarters unit) and 4. Staffel were based at Suwałki in northeastern Poland, 5. and 6. Staffel were transferred to a forward airfield at Sobolewo. For the invasion, II. Gruppe of JG 52 was subordinated to the Geschwaderstab (headquarters unit) of Jagdgeschwader 27 (JG 27—27th Fighter Wing). The Geschwader was part of the VIII. Fliegerkorps commanded by Generaloberst Wolfram Freiherr von Richthofen which supported the northern wing of Army Group Centre.

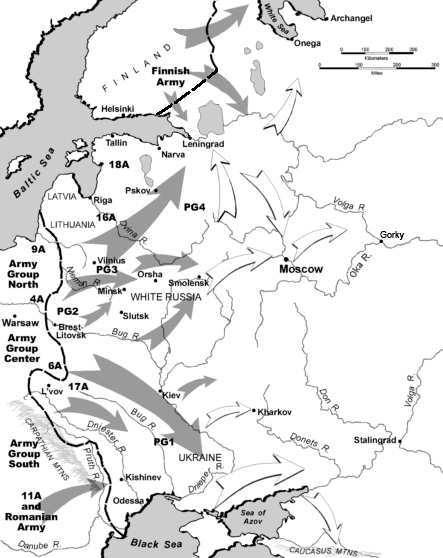
Map indicating Operation Barbarossa's attack plan

On 22 June, the German forces launched the attack on the Soviet Union which opened the Eastern Front. On 25 June, the Gruppe moved to an airfield at Varėna in Lithuania which had previously been occupied by the Soviet Air Forces (VVS—Voyenno-Vozdushnye Sily). Two days later, the Gruppe moved to Maladzyechna, supporting the advance Panzergruppe 3 near Barysaw. Flying from this airfield, Nemitz claimed his first aerial victories, two Ilyushin DB-3 bombers shot down on 3 July. The next day, II. Gruppe moved to Sloboda, east of Minsk, before moving to an airfield named Lepel-West at Lyepyel on 5 July. From this airfield, II. Gruppe flew combat air patrols and fighter escort missions to combat areas near Vitebsk and Haradok, supporting Panzergruppe 2 and 3 in their advance to Vitebsk and Polotsk. On 12 July, the Gruppe moved to Kamary, an airfield in the western parts of Vitebsk. Ten day later on 22 July, II. Gruppe advanced to the airfield Andrejewka near Smolensk where it stayed until 5 August. Operating from Andrejewka, Nemitz shot down a Petlyakov Pe-2 bomber on 23 July, a DB-3 and Tupolev SB bomber on 26 July and another DB-3 bomber on 27 July.

II. Gruppe was ordered to relocate to Soltsy, 30 kilometers (19 miles) west of Lake Ilmen, on 5 August in support of the 16th Army and Army Group North. Here, the Gruppe supported the fighting south of Lake Ilmen, and the German attacks on Shlisselburg, Leningrad and the Soviet fleet at Kronstadt. Operating from Soltsy, Nemitz claimed an I-18 fighter, referring to the Mikoyan-Gurevich MiG-1 fighter, shot down on 18 August near Chudovo. On 24 August, II. Gruppe was ordered to an airfield at Spasskaya Polist on the river Polist, south of Chudovo and north of Novgorod on Lake Ilmen, supporting the 18th Army in its advance towards the Neva and Lake Ladoga. Here on 30 August, Nemitz shot down another I-18 fighter. Since German forces had reached the proximity of Leningrad, II. Gruppe was ordered to Lyuban on 1 September, approximately 70 kilometers (43 miles) to Leningrad and located on the road to Moscow. The Gruppe stayed at Lyuban until 30 September, flying missions to Shlisselburg, Leningrad and Mga. Fighting in this combat area, Nemitz claimed two aerial victories in September 1941. On 13 September, he was credited with the destruction of an DB-3 bomber, followed by an Ilyushin Il-2 ground attack aircraft on 23 September.

On 2 October, German forces launched Operation Typhoon, the failed strategic offensive to capture Moscow. In support of this offensive, II. Gruppe was moved to Stabna, located just north of Smolensk. On 5 October, Nemitz claimed a Pe-2 bomber shot down. On 4 November, II. Gruppe had moved to Ruza. Here, Nemitz claimed his last aerial victories of 1941 when on 14 November he was credited with the destruction of two I-18 fighters, taking his total to 13 aerial victories.

=== Eastern Front ===
In late January 1942, II. Gruppe was withdrawn from the Eastern Front and sent to Jesau near Königsberg for a period of recuperation and replenishment, arriving on 24 January 1942. In Jesau, the Gruppe received many factory new Messerschmitt Bf 109 F-4 aircraft. On 14 April, II. Gruppe received orders to move to Pilsen, present-day Plzeň in the Czech Republic, for relocation to the Eastern Front. The Gruppe had also received a new commander, Woitke had been transferred and was replaced by Hauptmann Johannes Steinhoff. The Gruppe then moved to Wien-Schwechat on 24 April before flying to Zürichtal, present-day Solote Pole, a village near the urban settlement Kirovske in the Crimea. There, II. Gruppe participated in Operation Trappenjagd, a German counterattack during the Battle of the Kerch Peninsula, launched on 8 May. On 11 May, Nemitz claimed his first aerial victory of 1942 when he shot down a Polikarpov R-5 reconnaissance bomber aircraft.

II./JG 52 insignia

On 16 May, II. Gruppe relocated to Artyomovsk, present-day Bakhmut where JG 52 supported the German forces fighting in the Second Battle of Kharkov. Operating from Artyomovsk, the Gruppe flew combat missions in the combat area of Izium, flying fighter escort for bombers from Kampfgeschwader 27 (KG 27—27th Bomber Wing) and Sturzkampfgeschwader 77 (StG 77—77th Dive Bomber Wing). On 19 May, Nemitz claimed a MiG-1 fighter shot down. Four days later, the Gruppe was ordered to relocate to Barvinkove where they stayed until 1 June. Flying from Barvinkove, Nemitz claimed an Il-2 ground-attack aircraft on 26 May and a MiG-1 fighter the next day.

On 1 June, II. Gruppe moved to an airfield at Grakowo, located approximately halfway between Kharkov and Kupiansk. The main German objectives in that combat area were, breakthrough to the upper Don and capture of Voronezh. Here, Nemitz claimed four aerial victories in June, including a MiG-1 fighter on 4 June, a Lavochkin-Gorbunov-Gudkov LaGG-3 fighter 22 June, and a Yak-1 fighter on both 23 and 24 June. On 28 June, the Wehrmacht initiated Fall Blau (Case Blue), the 1942 strategic summer offensive in southern Russia. The objective was to secure the oil fields of Baku as well as an advance in the direction of Stalingrad along the Volga River, to cover the flanks of the advance towards Baku. Tasked with aerial support of this offensive was Luftflotte 4 (Air Fleet 4) to which JG 52 was subordinated. On 22 July, II. Gruppe moved to an airfield named Nowy Cholan, approximately 200 kilometers (120 miles) northeast of Rostov-on-Don. On 20 August, II. Gruppe reached the airfield at Tusov, approximately 25 kilometers (16 miles) southwest of Kalach-na-Donu on the western bank of the Don, from where the Gruppe operated in the combat area of Stalingrad. Flying from this airfield, Nemitz's number of aerial victories increased to 33 by end of August. On 27 October, he received the German Cross in Gold (Deutsches Kreuz in Gold).

=== Squadron leader and death ===
On 4 November 1942, Oberleutnant Siegfried Simsch, the Staffelkapitän (squadron leader) of 5. Staffel of JG 52, was severely injured in a flight accident. In consequence, Nemitz then briefly led the Staffel before Oberleutnant Gustav Denk officially took command in January 1943. On 22 January 1943, II. Gruppe had to retreat further and moved to an airfield at Rostov-on-Don. Here, Nemitz reached his 56th aerial victory by end of January. On 10 February 1943, Hauptmann Rudolf Resch, the commander of 6. Staffel of JG 52, was transferred. In consequence, Denk was also transferred to take command of 6. Staffel. When Denk was killed in action on 13 February, Nemitz led 6. Staffel as well as 5. Staffel until Leutnant Helmut Haberda was given command. On 13 March, the Gruppe moved to an airfield at Anapa. Here on 20 March, Nemitz was awarded the Knight's Cross of the Iron Cross (Ritterkreuz des Eisernen Kreuzes). At the end of March 1943, his number of aerial victories had reached 80.

On 9 April, Nemetz claimed his 81st and last aerial victory when he shot down a Pe-2 bomber. Two days later on 11 April, Nemitz was killed in action in the area of Anapa. His Bf 109 G-4 (Werknummer 14898—factory number) crashed near the village Nishne Bakanskaja located approximately 10 kilometers (6.2 miles) east-northeast of Anapa. According to Helmut Lipfert, who occasionally flew as his wingman, Nemitz Bf 109 crashed into a German infantry position. Command of 6. Staffel was then transferred to Oberleutnant Karl Ritzenberger. Posthumously, Nemitz was promoted to Leutnant (second lieutenant).

== Summary of career ==
=== Aerial victory claims ===
According to US historian David T. Zabecki, Nemitz was credited with 81 aerial victories. Spick also lists him with 81 aerial victories claimed in over 500 combat missions. Mathews and Foreman, authors of Luftwaffe Aces — Biographies and Victory Claims, researched the German Federal Archives and found records for 82 aerial victory claims, plus one further unconfirmed claim. All of his confirmed aerial victories were claimed on the Eastern Front.

Victory claims were logged to a map-reference (PQ = Planquadrat), for example "PQ 7152". The Luftwaffe grid map (Jägermeldenetz) covered all of Europe, western Russia and North Africa and was composed of rectangles measuring 15 minutes of latitude by 30 minutes of longitude, an area of about 360 square miles (930 km^{2}). These sectors were then subdivided into 36 smaller units to give a location area 3 km × 4 km (1.9 mi × 2.5 mi) in size.

Chronicle of aerial victories
This and the ? (question mark) indicates information discrepancies listed by Prien, Stemmer, Rodeike, Bock, Mathews and Foreman.
Claim	Date	Time	Type	Location	Claim	Date	Time	Type	Location
– 5. Staffel of Jagdgeschwader 52 – Operation Barbarossa — 22 June – 5 December 1941
1	3 July 1941	18:43	DB-3		8	30 August 1941	06:05	I-18 (MiG-1)	10 km (6.2 mi) northwest of Dubrovka
2	3 July 1941	18:45	DB-3		9	13 September 1941	16:45	DB-3	east of Klemenka
3	23 July 1941	06:35	Pe-2		10	23 September 1941	13:55	Il-2	
4	26 July 1941	04:35	DB-3		11? (Note: According to Mathews and Foreman this claim was unconfirmed.)	5 October 1941	—	Pe-2	
5	26 July 1941	04:45	SB-2		12	14 November 1941	08:35	I-18 (MiG-1)	
6	27 July 1941	16:50	DB-3		13	14 November 1941	08:45	I-18 (MiG-1)	
7	18 August 1941	13:40? (Note: According to Mathews and Foreman claimed at 13:30.)	I-18 (MiG-1)	30 km (19 mi) north of Chudovo					
– 5. Staffel of Jagdgeschwader 52 – Eastern Front — 7 May 1942 – July 1942
14	11 May 1942	12:03	R-5		22	6 July 1942	15:15	Hurricane	
15	19 May 1942	04:15	MiG-1		23	16 July 1942	17:55	LaGG-3	
16	26 May 1942	10:21	Il-2		24	19 July 1942	06:03	LaGG-3	
17	27 May 1942	04:43	MiG-1		25	19 July 1942	17:20	LaGG-3	
18	4 June 1942	04:15	MiG-1		26	21 July 1942	12:20	R-5	
19	22 June 1942	06:40	LaGG-3	PQ 7152	27	22 July 1942	06:35	LaGG-3	
20	23 June 1942	14:15	Yak-1		28	23 July 1942	12:55	Il-2	
21	24 June 1942	16:47	Yak-1						
– 4. Staffel of Jagdgeschwader 52 – Eastern Front — July – August 1942
29	23 August 1942	16:02	LaGG-3	PQ 49242; 10 km (6.2 mi) northeast of Stalingrad	32	27 August 1942	10:10	LaGG-3	PQ 49231; 35–40 km (22–25 mi) east-northeast of Stalingrad
30	23 August 1942	16:03	LaGG-3	PQ 49242; 10 km (6.2 mi) northeast of Stalingrad	33	29 August 1942	06:08	LaGG-3	PQ 49213 northeast of Grebenka
31	24 August 1942	17:25	LaGG-3	PQ 49233; 35–40 km (22–25 mi) east-northeast of Stalingrad					
– 5. Staffel of Jagdgeschwader 52 – Eastern Front — August 1942 – 3 February 1943
34	31 August 1942	10:50	LaGG-3	PQ 49282; 20–30 km (12–19 mi) east of Stalingrad	46	11 December 1942	09:28	LaGG-3	PQ 29632, northwest of Kulpinskij
35	31 August 1942	17:20	LaGG-3	PQ 59454	47	17 December 1942	11:18	La-5	PQ 38241, south of Shutow 2 south of Shutow railroad
36	1 September 1942	16:45	LaGG-3	PQ 75272 vicinity of Bakanskij	48	18 December 1942	09:16	La-5	PQ 49722; 30 km (19 mi) northeast of Aksay
37	7 September 1942	05:50	I-16	PQ 44664	49	18 December 1942	09:22	Il-2	PQ 49753; 30 km (19 mi) east-northeast of Aksay
38	8 September 1942	14:48	LaGG-3	PQ 54513	50	19 December 1942	14:08	LaGG-3	5 km (3.1 mi) southeast of Dubowyi
39	29 October 1942	15:50	LaGG-3	PQ 94752	51	22 December 1942	13:18	La-5	PQ 39863; 10 km (6.2 mi) north of Aksay
40	26 November 1942	12:00	P-40	PQ 49271; 5 km (3.1 mi) east of Stalingrad	52	22 December 1942	13:25	La-5	PQ 49713; 65 km (40 mi) south-southeast of Stalingrad
41	28 November 1942	09:20	LaGG-3	PQ 49294; 40 km (25 mi) east of Stalingrad	53	28 December 1942	12:48	La-5	PQ 49473 vicinity of Sarepka
42	28 November 1942	12:45	Il-2	PQ 49321 vicinity of Bassargeno	54	22 January 1943	10:15	Il-2	PQ 08742; 25 km (16 mi) east-southeast of Rostov-on-Don
43	30 November 1942	08:52	LaGG-3	PQ 49443; 20 km (12 mi) southeast of Stalingrad	55	22 January 1943	10:22	Il-2	PQ 08761; 40 km (25 mi) southeast of Novocherkassk
44	1 December 1942	07:23	La-5	PQ 39384; 10 km (6.2 mi) north of Nizhnii Chir	56	30 January 1943	08:54	La-5	PQ 08813
? (Note: This claim is not listed by Prien, Stemmer, Rodeike and Bock. Mathews and Foreman list this claim as his 44th aerial victory.)	8 December 1942	10:50	Pe-2		57	2 February 1943	11:13	La-5	PQ 1854
? (Note: This claim is not listed by Prien, Stemmer, Rodeike and Bock. Mathews and Foreman list this claim as his 45th aerial victory.)	8 December 1942	12:10	Boston	20 km (12 mi) southwest of Kletskaya	58	2 February 1943	14:50	La-5	PQ 08692
45	11 December 1942	09:22	LaGG-3	PQ 39511, northwest of Kulpinskij; 10 km (6.2 mi) west of Nizhnii Chir					
– 5. Staffel of Jagdgeschwader 52 – Eastern Front — 4–13 February 1943
59	5 February 1943	10:35	La-5	PQ 44 Ost 08841; 30 km (19 mi) east of Szolnok	61	12 February 1943	13:10	LaGG-3	PQ 34 Ost 86 483 southwest of Timashyovsk
59	5 February 1943	10:40	La-5	PQ 44 Ost 08672					
– 6. Staffel of Jagdgeschwader 52 – Eastern Front — 13 February – 11 April 1943
62	22 February 1943	06:10	LaGG-3	PQ 34 Ost 85371 vicinity of Gelendzhik	72	17 March 1943	09:02	Il-2	PQ 34 Ost 76881 southeast of Warenikowskaja
63	25 February 1943	08:35	I-153	PQ 34 Ost 75261 north of Nowo-Bakanskaja	73	17 March 1943	09:06	Il-2	PQ 34 Ost 75261 north of Nowo-Bakanskaja
64	5 March 1943	09:40	Boston	PQ 34 Ost 86334 vicinity of Barily	74	17 March 1943	09:10	Il-2	PQ 34 Ost 75251 vicinity of Natuchajewskaja
65	5 March 1943	14:02	I-153	PQ 34 Ost 75431; 3 km (1.9 mi) southeast of Novorossiysk	75	18 March 1943	09:45	LaGG-3	PQ 34 Ost 86561 vicinity of Staronishe-Steblijewskaja
66	9 March 1943	08:07	Pe-2	PQ 34 Ost 75194 southeast of Anapa	76	18 March 1943	09:55	LaGG-3	PQ 34 Ost 86584 east of Slavyansk-on-Kuban
67	11 March 1943	08:13	DB-3	PQ 34 Ost 65214; Black Sea, southeast of Cape Takyl	77	18 March 1943	09:58	LaGG-3	PQ 34 Ost 86593
68	12 March 1943	10:19	I-16	PQ 34 Ost 76981	78	19 March 1943	09:05	P-39	PQ 34 Ost 86591 northwest of Iwanowskaja
69	14 March 1943	06:40	Boston	PQ 34 Ost 76773; Black Sea, west of Blagoweschtschenskoje	79	20 March 1943	09:17	LaGG-3	PQ 34 Ost 86513 east of Petrovskaya
70	14 March 1943	06:54	Boston	PQ 34 Ost 76754 vicinity of Utasch	80	29 March 1943	12:40	Il-2 m.H. (Note: The "m.H." refers to an Ilyushin Il-2 with rear gunner (mit Heckschütze).)	PQ 34 Ost 66653 over the Kerch Strait
71	16 March 1943	14:20	Il-2	PQ 34 Ost 76582 vicinity of Fischer	81	9 April 1943	09:43	Pe-2	PQ 34 Ost 76833 vicinity of Anaetasiwskaja

=== Awards ===
- Iron Cross (1939) 2nd and 1st Class
- Honor Goblet of the Luftwaffe on 7 September 1942 as Feldwebel and pilot
- German Cross in Gold on 27 October 1942 as Feldwebel in the 5./Jagdgeschwader 52
- Knight's Cross of the Iron Cross on 24 March 1943 as Oberfeldwebel and pilot in the 4./Jagdgeschwader 52 (Note: According to Scherzer as pilot in the 5./Jagdgeschwader 52.)
