= Siegfried Simsch =

German World War II fighter pilot

- Born: 6 September 1913; Posen, German Empire
- Died: 8 June 1944 (aged 30); Rennes, France
- Cause of death: Killed in action
- Military career
- Allegiance: Nazi Germany
- Branch: Luftwaffe
- Rank: Hauptmann (captain)
- Units: JG 52, JG 11
- Commands: 5./JG 52, 10./JG 11, I./JG 11
- Conflicts: See battles World War II: Battle of Britain; Eastern Front; Defence of the Reich †
- Awards: Knight's Cross of the Iron Cross

Siegfried Simsch (6 September 1913 – 8 June 1944) was a German Luftwaffe military aviator and fighter ace during World War II. He is credited with 54 aerial victories, all of which claimed on the Eastern Front, achieved in approximately 400 combat missions.

Born in Posen and half Jewish, Simsch joined the military service in the Luftwaffe. Following flight training, he was posted to Jagdgeschwader 134 "Horst Wessel" (JG 134—134th Fighter Wing) before World War II. In late 1940, Simsch was transferred to Jagdgeschwader 52 (JG 52—52nd Fighter Wing) and fought against the Royal Air Force (RAF). During Operation Barbarossa, the German invasion of the Soviet Union, he claimed his first aerial victory on 22 June 1941. In September 1941, he was made Staffelkapitän (squadron leader) of 5. Staffel (5th squadron) of JG 52. Simsch was awarded the Knight's Cross of the Iron Cross on 1 July 1942. In November of that year, he was severely wounded in a flight accident, grounding him for a year. In November 1943, Simsch was transferred to Jagdgeschwader 11 (JG 11—11th Fighter Wing), a unit fighting in Defense of the Reich. On 1 June 1944, he was appointed Gruppenkommandeur (group commander) of I. Gruppe of JG 11. One week later, and two days after the Normandy landings, Simsch was shot down and killed in action on 8 June 1944 over Rennes, France.

== Early life and career ==
Simsch was born on 6 September 1913 in Posen, present-day Poznań in west-central Poland, at the time the capital of the Province of Posen, a Prussian province of the German Empire. Despite being half Jewish, or Mischling under the Nuremberg Laws, (Note: see also German Jewish military personnel of World War II) he enlisted in the Luftwaffe and served with distinction. Following flight training, (Note: Flight training in the Luftwaffe progressed through the levels A1, A2 and B1, B2, referred to as A/B flight training. A training included theoretical and practical training in aerobatics, navigation, long-distance flights and dead-stick landings. The B courses included high-altitude flights, instrument flights, night landings and training to handle the aircraft in difficult situations.) he was posted to Jagdgeschwader 134 "Horst Wessel" (JG 134—134th Fighter Wing).

== World War II ==
World War II in Europe began on Friday 1 September 1939 when German forces invaded Poland. In late 1940, Simsch was posted to 5. Staffel (5th squadron) of Jagdgeschwader 52 (JG 52—52nd Fighter Wing). The Staffel was commanded by Oberleutnant August-Wilhelm Schumann and subordinated to II. Gruppe of JG 52 which was headed by Hauptmann Wilhelm Ensslen. On 2 November, Ensslen was killed in action and replaced by Hauptmann Erich Woitke.

On 15 April 1941, the Luftwaffe ordered an attack on the Royal Air Force (RAF) airfield at Manston. Due to adverse weather conditions, the attack was called off and only a Schwarm, a flight of four aircraft, under the leadership of Simsch, was assumed to have reached the target. The flight however had found the Luftwaffe airfield at Saint-Omer where II. Gruppe of Jagdgeschwader 53 (JG 53—53rd Fighter Wing) was based. In the attack, the Schwarm destroyed nine aircraft, wounding two pilots and five technicians. The pilots Simsch, Feldwebel Georg Mayr, Gefreiter Adolf Glunz and Unteroffizier Hans Sembill were punished by Hermann Göring personally. In addition, Simsch's advancement in career—he had been scheduled to become a Staffelkapitän (squadron leader) prior to this event—was deferred.

According to Barbas, Simsch claimed an unconfirmed aerial victory over a RAF Supermarine Spitfire north of Dover on 19 May 1941. This claim is not listed by Prien, Stemmer, Rodeike and Bock.

=== Operation Barbarossa ===
In preparation of Operation Barbarossa, the German invasion of the Soviet Union, II. Gruppe of JG 52, without a period of replenishment in Germany, was ordered to airfields close to the German-Soviet demarcation line. While the Gruppenstab (group headquarters unit) and 4. Staffel were based at Suwałki in northeastern Poland, 5. and 6. Staffel were transferred to a forward airfield at Sobolewo. For the invasion, II. Gruppe of JG 52 was subordinated to the Geschwaderstab (headquarters unit) of Jagdgeschwader 27 (JG 27—27th Fighter Wing). The Geschwader was part of the VIII. Fliegerkorps commanded by Generaloberst Wolfram Freiherr von Richthofen which supported the northern wing of Army Group Centre.

II./JG 52 insignia

On 22 June, the German forces launched the attack on the Soviet Union which opened the Eastern Front. That day, Simsch claimed his first aerial victory. He was credited with shooting down a Polikarpov I-15 fighter west of Varėna. On 28 June, II. Gruppe moved to an airfield at Maladzyechna where they stayed until 4 July. Here Simsch claimed two Polikarpov R-Z reconnaissance bomber aircraft shot down on 1 July. Three days later, II. Gruppe moved further east to an airfield at Sloboda, east of Minsk before moving to Lyepyel on 5 July. Fyling from Lyepyel, Simsch claimed a Petlyakov Pe-2 bomber shot down on 7 July and an Ilyushin DB-3 bomber on 9 July. On 13 July, the Gruppe moved to Kamary, an airfield in the western parts of Vitebsk.

On 6 September 1941, Simsch succeeded Oberleutnant August-Wilhelm Schumann as Staffelkapitän of 5. Staffel of JG 52. Schumann had been killed in action that day. II. Gruppe moved to an airfield at Klin, located 85 kilometers (53 mi) northwest of Moscow, on 30 November. There, Simsch claimed two I-61 fighters, an early German designation for the Mikoyan-Gurevich MiG-3 fighter, one each on 2 and 4 December, in combat near Moscow.

=== Eastern Front ===
On 29 May 1942, Simsch was wounded in combat with a Soviet bomber. He was forced to bail out of his Messerschmitt Bf 109 F-4/R1 10 kilometers (6.2 miles) west of Izium. During his convalescence, he was replaced by Leutnant Waldemar Semelka (29 May – 30 June 1942) and later by Leutnant Heinz Schmidt (1 July – 30 September 1942). On 1 July, Simsch was awarded the Knight's Cross of the Iron Cross (Ritterkreuz des Eisernes Kreuzes) for 45 aerial victories. Simsch was one of four JG 52 pilots presented with the Knight's Cross that day. The other three pilots to receive the distinction that day were Feldwebel Alfred Grislawski, Feldwebel Karl Steffen and Unteroffizier Karl Gratz.

On 3 November 1942, engine failure of his Bf 109 G-2 (Werknummer 13711—factory number) resulted in a forced landing northwest of Maykop. Simsch was severely injured in the accident. Oberfeldwebel Willi Nemitz then briefly led 5. Staffel before Oberleutnant Gustav Denk officially took command of the Staffel in January 1943.

=== Defense of the Reich ===
On 30 November 1943, following a lengthy period of convalescence, Simsch was transferred to Jagdgeschwader 11 (JG 11—11th Fighter Wing) where he was appointed Staffelkapitän of 10. Staffel. He replaced Oberleutnant Günter Witt. On 17 May 1944, seven RAF North American P-51 Mustang fighters from the Second Tactical Air Force attacked the Aalborg Airfield in Denmark. The RAF fighters claimed nine aerial victories before 10. Staffel intercepted the RAF fighters. In the pursuit, two No. 122 Squadron P-51 fighters were shot down, including one by Simsch.

On 1 June 1944, he was appointed Gruppenkommandeur (group commander) of I. Gruppe of JG 11 to replace Oberleutnant Hans-Heinrich Koenig who was killed in action on 24 May. One week later, and two days after the Normandy landings Siegfried Simsch was shot down by a North American P-51 Mustang and killed on 8 June 1944 over Rennes, France. His Focke-Wulf Fw 190 A-8 (Werknummer 730448) crashed near Vitré.

== Summary of career ==
=== Aerial victory claims ===
According to US historian David T. Zabecki, Simsch was credited with 54 aerial victories. Obermaier also lists him with 54 aerial victories claimed in approximately 400 combat missions. The author Rigg however lists him with 95 aerial victories claimed. Mathews and Foreman, authors of Luftwaffe Aces — Biographies and Victory Claims, researched the German Federal Archives and found records for 54 aerial victory claims, all of which claimed on the Eastern Front.

Victory claims were logged to a map-reference (PQ = Planquadrat), for example "PQ 95754". The Luftwaffe grid map (Jägermeldenetz) covered all of Europe, western Russia and North Africa and was composed of rectangles measuring 15 minutes of latitude by 30 minutes of longitude, an area of about 360 square miles (930 km^{2}). These sectors were then subdivided into 36 smaller units to give a location area 3 km × 4 km (1.9 mi × 2.5 mi) in size.

Chronicle of aerial victories
This and the – (dash) indicates unconfirmed aerial victory claims for which Simsch did not receive credit. This and the ? (question mark) indicates information discrepancies listed by Barbas, Prien, Stemmer, Rodeike, Bock, Mathews and Foreman.
| Claim | Date | Time | Type | Location | Claim | Date | Time | Type | Location |
– 5. Staffel of Jagdgeschwader 52 – At the Channel and over England — 26 June 1940 – 9 June 1941
| — ? (Note: This claim is not listed by Prien, Stemmer, Rodeike and Bock, nor is it listed by Mathews and Foreman.) | 19 May 1941 | — | Spitfire | north of Dover | | | | | |
– 4. Staffel of Jagdgeschwader 52 – Operation Barbarossa — 22 June – 6 September 1941
| 1 | 22 June 1941 | 10:00 | I-15 | west of Varėna | 8 | 28 July 1941 | 19:02 | Pe-2 | |
| 2 | 1 July 1941 | 19:18 | R-Z? (Note: According to Mathews and Foreman claimed as a Polikarpov R-5.) | | 9 | 29 July 1941 | 17:30 | DB-3 | |
| 3 | 1 July 1941 | 19:19 | R-Z? | | 10 | 29 July 1941 | 17:36 | DB-3 | |
| 4 | 7 July 1941 | 16:43 | Pe-2 | | 11 | 27 August 1941 | 09:11 | SB-2 | |
| 5 | 9 July 1941 | 13:36 | DB-3 | | 12 | 6 September 1941 | 16:42 | I-18 (MiG-1) | |
| 6 | 15 July 1941 | 08:23 | I-16 | | 13 | 6 September 1941 | 16:48? (Note: According to Mathews and Foreman claimed at 18:48.) | I-18 (MiG-1) | |
| 7 | 25 July 1941 | 12:28 | I-18 (MiG-1) | | | | | | |
– 5. Staffel of Jagdgeschwader 52 – Operation Barbarossa — 7 September – 5 December 1941
| 14 | 11 September 1941 | 08:52 | I-18 (MiG-1) | | 21 | 14 November 1941 | 08:38 | I-18 (MiG-1) | |
| 15 | 15 September 1941 | 08:59 | DB-3 | | 22 | 14 November 1941 | 12:25 | I-16 | |
| 16 | 15 September 1941 | 13:58 | DB-3 | | 23 | 30 November 1941 | 10:26 | I-26 (Yak-1) | |
| 17 | 24 September 1941 | 16:23 | I-18 (MiG-1) | | 24 | 30 November 1941 | 10:34 | U-2 | |
| 18 | 12 November 1941 | 15:40 | I-18 (MiG-1) | | 25 | 2 December 1941 | 09:48 | I-61 (MiG-3) | 20 km (12 mi) southwest of Moscow |
| 19 | 14 November 1941 | 08:25 | I-18 (MiG-1) | | 26 | 4 December 1941 | 10:32 | I-61 (MiG-3) | vicinity of Moscow |
| 20 | 14 November 1941 | 08:35 | I-18 (MiG-1) | | | | | | |
– 5. Staffel of Jagdgeschwader 52 – Eastern Front — 7 May – 3 November 1942
| 27 | 8 May 1942 | 15:15 | MiG-1 | | 41 | 27 May 1942 | 06:08 | V-11 (Il-2) | |
| 28 | 9 May 1942 | 12:36 | I-153 | | 42 | 27 May 1942 | 15:36 | LaGG-3 | |
| 29 | 9 May 1942 | 12:41 | I-153 | | 43 | 27 May 1942 | 15:44 | BB-100 | 3 km (1.9 mi) northwest of Petrovkaya |
| 30 | 9 May 1942 | 15:25 | MiG-1 | | 44 | 28 May 1942 | 12:42 | Il-2 | |
| 31 | 11 May 1942 | 11:34 | R-5 | | 45 | 28 May 1942 | 12:43 | Il-2 | |
| 32 | 15 May 1942 | 05:41 | MiG-1 | | 46 | 6 October 1942 | 12:30 | LaGG-3 | PQ 95754; 25 km (16 mi) east-northeast of Tuapse |
| 33 | 15 May 1942 | 05:48 | MiG-1 | | 47 | 10 October 1942 | 14:50 | LaGG-3 | PQ 95593; 30 km (19 mi) northeast of Tuapse |
| 34 | 22 May 1942 | 15:00 | BB-100 | | 48 | 11 October 1942 | 05:35 | I-153 | PQ 95761; 25 km (16 mi) east of Tuapse |
| 35 | 24 May 1942 | 14:26 | V-11 (Il-2) | | 49 | 22 October 1942 | 09:35 | I-16 | PQ 95541, north of Maykop; 30 km (19 mi) north of Tuapse |
| 36 | 24 May 1942 | 14:28 | V-11 (Il-2) | | 50 | 26 October 1942 | 12:25 | La-5 | PQ 44814 |
| 37 | 26 May 1942 | 10:15 | Il-2 | | 51 | 29 October 1942 | 12:55 | LaGG-3 | PQ 95152 |
| 38 | 26 May 1942 | 15:36 | BB-100 | | 52 | 29 October 1942 | 12:58 | LaGG-3 | PQ 95154 vicinity of Lazarevskoye |
| 39 | 26 May 1942 | 15:42 | BB-100 | 1 km (0.62 mi) northeast of Petrovka | 53 | 30 October 1942 | 12:40 | LaGG-3 | PQ 95771; Black Sea, 10 km (6.2 mi) south of Tuapse |
| 40 | 26 May 1942 | 15:46 | BB-100 | | 54 | 30 October 1942 | 15:25 | LaGG-3 | PQ 94145 vicinity of Lazarevskoye |
– 10. Staffel of Jagdgeschwader 11 – Defense of the Reich — 1 January 1940 – 31 May 1944
| 55? (Note: This claim is not listed by Mathews and Foreman.) | 17 May 1944 | — | P-51 | | | | | | |

=== Awards ===
- Honor Goblet of the Luftwaffe on 20 December 1941 as Oberleutnant and pilot
- Knight's Cross of the Iron Cross on 1 July 1942 as Oberleutnant and Staffelkapitän of the 5./Jagdgeschwader 52

== Notes ==
Military offices
| Preceded by Oberleutnant Fritz Engau | Gruppenkommandeur of I. Gruppe of Jagdgeschwader 11; 1 June 1944 – 8 June 1944 | Succeeded by Oberleutnant Fritz Engau |
