= Waldemar Semelka =

German World War II fighter pilot

- Born: 8 January 1920; Doubrava, Czechoslovakia
- Died: 21 August 1942 (aged 22); Stalingrad, Soviet Union
- Military career
- Allegiance: Nazi Germany
- Branch: Luftwaffe
- Rank: Leutnant (second lieutenant)
- Unit: JG 52
- Commands: 5./JG 52, 4./JG 52
- Conflicts: See battles World War II: Eastern Front; Operation Barbarossa; Battle of the Kerch Peninsula; Second Battle of Kharkov; Battle of Stalingrad
- Awards: Knight's Cross of the Iron Cross

Waldemar Semelka (8 January 1920 – 21 August 1942) was a German Luftwaffe military aviator and fighter ace during World War II. He is credited with 75 aerial victories, all on the Eastern Front, achieved in 240 combat missions.

Born in Dombrau, Semelka joined the military service in the Luftwaffe. Following flight training, he was posted to Jagdgeschwader 52 (JG 52—52nd Fighter Wing). Semelka claimed his first aerial victory on 22 June 1941, the first day of Operation Barbarossa, the German invasion of the Soviet Union. In June 1942, he was temporarily geven command of 5. Staffel (5th squadron) of JG 52. In late July, he was tasked with leading 4. Staffel of JG 52. Semelka was killed in action on 21 August 1942 near Srednyaya Akhtuba during the Battle of Stalingrad. Posthumously, he was awarded the Knight's Cross of the Iron Cross.

== Military career ==
Semelka was born on 8 January 1920 in Dombrau, at the time in the Teschen District which after World War I became disputed land between the Czechoslovak Republic and the Second Polish Republic. Present-day, Dombrau is Doubrava in the Czech Republic.

Following flight training, Semelka was posted to 4. Staffel (4th squadron) of Jagdgeschwader 52 (JG 52—52nd Fighter Wing), a squadron of II. Gruppe (2nd group) of JG 52 in 1941. In preparation of Operation Barbarossa, the German invasion of the Soviet Union, II. Gruppe of JG 52, without a period of replenishment in Germany, was ordered to airfields close to the German-Soviet demarcation line. While the Gruppenstab (group headquarters unit) and 4. Staffel were based at Suwałki in northeastern Poland, 5. and 6. Staffel were transferred to a forward airfield at Sobolewo. For the invasion, II. Gruppe of JG 52 was subordinated to the Geschwaderstab (headquarters unit) of Jagdgeschwader 27 (JG 27—27th Fighter Wing). The Geschwader was part of the VIII. Fliegerkorps commanded by Generaloberst Wolfram Freiherr von Richthofen which supported the northern wing of Army Group Centre.

=== Operation Barbarossa ===
At the start of Operation Barbarossa on 22 June 1941, Semelka's 4. Staffel was headed by Oberleutnant Johannes Steinhoff and II. Gruppe was commanded by Hauptmann Erich Woitke. The Gruppe supported the advancing 9th Army and 3rd Panzer Group in their attack on the border fortifications east and southeast of Suwałki. Semelka claimed his first aerial victory on the morning of 22 June when he shot down a Polikarpov I-15 fighter. (Note: According to Barbas, Semelka claimed his first aerial victory on 2 July 1942 over an Ilyushin DB-3 bomber shot down near Barysaw.) On 25 June, the Gruppe moved to an airfield at Varėna in Lithuania which had previously been occupied by the Soviet Air Forces (VVS—Voyenno-Vozdushnye Sily). Two days later, the Gruppe moved to Maladzyechna, supporting the advance Panzergruppe 3 near Barysaw. Flying from this airfield, Semelka claimed an Ilyushin DB-3 bomber shot down on 2 July. Two days later, the Gruppe moved to Sloboda, east of Minsk, before moving to an airfield named Lepel-West at Lyepyel on 5 July. From this airfield, II. Gruppe flew combat air patrols and fighter escort missions to combat areas near Vitebsk and Haradok, supporting Panzergruppe 2 and 3 in their advance to Vitebsk and Polotsk. Here, Semelka claimed the destruction of another DB-3 bomber on 6 July.

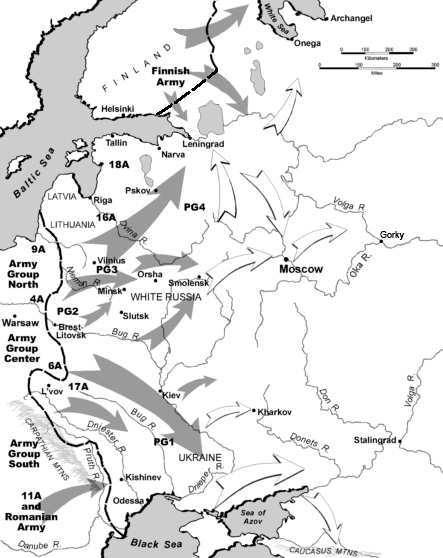
Map indicating Operation Barbarossa's attack plan

II. Gruppe was ordered to relocate to Soltsy, 30 kilometers (19 miles) west of Lake Ilmen, on 5 August in support of the 16th Army and Army Group North. Here, the Gruppe supported the fighting south of Lake Ilmen, and the German attacks on Shlisselburg, Leningrad and the Soviet fleet at Kronstadt. Operating from Soltsy, Semelka claimed an I-17 fighter, an early war designation for the Mikoyan-Gurevich MiG-1, and a Vultee V-11 ground attack aircraft, probably referring to the Ilyushin Il-2, shot down on 14 August. On 24 August, II. Gruppe was ordered to an airfield at Spasskaya Polist on the river Polist, south of Chudovo and north of Novgorod on Lake Ilmen, supporting the 18th Army in its advance towards the Neva and Lake Ladoga. Semelka claimed three fighters while flying from Spasskaya Polist, one Polikarpov I-16 on 25 August and two I-17 fighters the following day.

Since German forces had reached the proximity of Leningrad, II. Gruppe was ordered to Lyuban, approximately 70 kilometers (43 miles) to Leningrad and located on the road to Moscow. The Gruppe stayed at Lyuban until 30 September, flying missions to Shlisselburg, Leningrad and Mga. Fighting in this combat area, Semelka claimed four aerial victories in September 1941. On 11 September, he was credited with the destruction of an I-18 fighter, also referring to the MiG-1 fighter, followed by an Il-2 ground attack aircraft and an I-18 fighter on 23 September, and a Petlyakov Pe-2 bomber on 24 September. On 2 October, German forces launched Operation Typhoon, the failed strategic offensive to capture Moscow. In support of this offensive, II. Gruppe was moved to Stabna, located just north of Smolensk.

On 12 October, II. Gruppe was ordered to Novodugino where it stayed for four days. The Gruppe then moved to an airfield west of Kalinin, present-day Tver, on 16 October. While stationed at Kalinin, the Gruppe was so close to the front line that their airbases were shelled by Russian artillery, and ground crew had to defend against enemy attacks. On 4 November, II. Gruppe had moved to Ruza. There, Semelka claimed an I-18 fighter on 6 November and two further I-18 fighters on 14 November. On 27 November, he claimed his 17th in total and last aerial victory of 1941, a BB-22 light bomber/reconnaissance aircraft referring to the Yakovlev Yak-2.

=== Eastern Front ===
In late January 1942, II. Gruppe was withdrawn from the Eastern Front and sent to Jesau near Königsberg for a period of recuperation and replenishment, arriving on 24 January 1942. In Jesau, the Gruppe received many factory new Bf 109 F-4 aircraft. On 14 April, II. Gruppe received orders to move to Pilsen, present-day Plzeň in the Czech Republic, for relocation to the Eastern Front. The Gruppe had also received a new commander, Woitke had been transferred and was replaced by Hauptmann Steinhoff. The Gruppe then moved to Wien-Schwechat on 24 April before flying to Zürichtal, present-day Solote Pole, a village near the urban settlement Kirovske in the Crimea. There, II. Gruppe participated in Operation Trappenjagd, a German counterattack during the Battle of the Kerch Peninsula, launched on 8 May. On 12 May, Semelka crashed his Bf 109 F-4/R1 (Werknummer 13057—factory number) near Marfivka, a village located approximately 20 kilometers (12 miles) east of Chelyadinove. Slightly injured, he returned to his unit on foot.

On 16 May, II. Gruppe relocated to Artyomovsk, present-day Bakhmut where JG 52 supported the German forces fighting in the Second Battle of Kharkov. Operating from Artyomovsk, the Gruppe flew combat missions in the combat area of Izium, flying fighter escort for bombers from Kampfgeschwader 27 (KG 27—27th Bomber Wing) and Sturzkampfgeschwader 77 (StG 77—77th Dive Bomber Wing). Here, Semelka claimed an Il-2 ground-attack aircraft shot down on 23 May. That day, the Gruppe was ordered to relocate to Barvinkove where they stayed until 1 June. From Barvinkove, Semelka claimed one aerial victory on 24 May, two on 25 May, three on 26 May, and again three on 28 May, taking his total to 27 aerial victories.

=== Squadron leader and death ===
On 29 May 1942, Oberleutnant Siegfried Simsch, the commander of 5. Staffel, was wounded in combat. In consequence, Semelka was transferred to 5. Staffel to temporarily lead the Staffel as Staffelführer (squadron leader). On 1 June, II. Gruppe moved to an airfield at Grakowo, located approximately halfway between Kharkov and Kupiansk. The main German objectives in that combat area were, breakthrough to the upper Don and capture of Voronezh. That day, Semelka claimed a MiG-1 fighter shot down. Flying from Grakowo, Semelka claimed 18 further aerial victories in June 1942, one on 3 June, two on 9 June, two on 13 June, and again two the following day, one on 16 and 21 June each, four on 22 June, one on 23 June, three on 24 June, and lastly, one on 25 June, taking his total to 46 aerial victories. The Gruppe stayed at Grakowo until 26 June when it moved to Bilyi Kolodiaz.

II./JG 52 insignia

On 28 June, the Wehrmacht initiated Fall Blau (Case Blue), the 1942 strategic summer offensive in southern Russia. The objective was to secure the oil fields of Baku as well as an advance in the direction of Stalingrad along the Volga River, to cover the flanks of the advance towards Baku. Tasked with aerial support of this offensive was Luftflotte 4 (Air Fleet 4) to which JG 52 was subordinated. On 1 July, command of 5. Staffel was transferred to Leutnant Heinz Schmidt and Semelka was transferred back to 4. Staffel which was under the command of Oberleutnant Gerhard Barkhorn. On 6 July, Semelka was awarded the Honour Goblet of the Luftwaffe (Ehrenpokal der Luftwaffe). On 17 July, II. Gruppe moved to Taganrog, staying there until 22 July. Here, Semelka increased his number of aerial victories to 55 claims, three on 19 July, two on 20 July, one the next day, and three on 22 June.

On 22 July, II. Gruppe moved to an airfield named Nowy Cholan, approximately 200 kilometers (120 miles) northeast of Rostov-on-Don. The following day, Semelka became an "ace-in-a-day" for the first time when shot down six Il-2 ground-attack aircraft. The following day, he shot down four further Il-2 ground-attack aircraft. On 25 July, he was given temporary command of the 4. Staffel when the commander Oberleutnant Barkhorn was wounded in combat.

On 18 August he shot down five fighters making him an "ace-in-a-day" for the second time, in two missions over the Black Sea coast near Novorossiysk. The next day, Steinhoff led II. Gruppe of JG 52 to the Stalingrad sector to cover the imminent storming of the city. On 21 August, in their first operational sorties, Semelka shot down three fighters, bringing his total to 65. However, later that same day he was reported missing to the south of Stalingrad. It is possible he was shot down and killed by return fire from Pe-2 bombers of 86 BAP (Bombardirovochnyy Aviatsionyy Polk—Bomber Aviation Regiment). Alternatively, Semelka may have been shot down in his Bf 109 G-2 (Werknummer 13558) by a Douglas A-20 Havoc bomber north of Srednyaya Akhtuba. At the time of his death, he was the third-highest claiming fighter pilot in II. Gruppe of JG 52. Posthumously, he was awarded the Knight's Cross of the Iron Cross (Ritterkreuz des Eisernen Kreuzes) on 4 September 1942. Depending on source, the German Cross in Gold (Deutsches Kreuz in Gold) was either awarded the day he was killed, or also posthumously on 7 September 1942.

== Summary of career ==
=== Aerial victory claims ===
According to Obermaier, Semelka claimed 75 aerial victories in approximately 240 combat missions, while Spick lists him with 65 aerial victories, and a mission-to-claim ratio of 3.69. The US historian David T. Zabecki also lists Semelka with 65 aerial victories. Mathews and Foreman, authors of Luftwaffe Aces – Biographies and Victory Claims, researched the German Federal Archives and found records for 74 aerial victory claims, plus three further unconfirmed claim. All of his aerial victories were claimed on the Eastern Front.

Victory claims were logged to a map-reference (PQ = Planquadrat), for example "PQ 75424". The Luftwaffe grid map (Jägermeldenetz) covered all of Europe, western Russia and North Africa and was composed of rectangles measuring 15 minutes of latitude by 30 minutes of longitude, an area of about 360 square miles (930 km^{2}). These sectors were then subdivided into 36 smaller units to give a location area 3 km × 4 km (1.9 mi × 2.5 mi) in size.

Chronicle of aerial victories
This and the ♠ (Ace of spades) indicates those aerial victories which made Semelka an "ace-in-a-day", a term which designates a fighter pilot who has shot down five or more airplanes in a single day. This and the – (dash) indicates unconfirmed aerial victory claims for which Barkhorn did not receive credit. This and the ? (question mark) indicates information discrepancies listed by Prien, Stemmer, Rodeike, Bock, Mathews and Foreman.
Claim	Date	Time	Type	Location	Claim	Date	Time	Type	Location
– 4. Staffel of Jagdgeschwader 52 – Operation Barbarossa — 22 June – 5 December 1941
1	22 June 1941	09:48	I-15		10	11 September 1941	16:30	I-18 (MiG-1)	
2	26 June 1941	09:43	DB-3		11	23 September 1941	13:58	Il-2	
3	2 July 1941	17:25? (Note: According to Mathews and Foreman claimed at 17:35.)	DB-3	south of Barysaw	12	23 September 1941	16:31	I-18 (MiG-1)	
4	6 July 1941	12:43	DB-3		13	24 September 1941	11:55	Pe-2	
5	14 August 1941	11:10	I-17 (MiG-1)		14	6 November 1941	11:20	I-18 (MiG-1)	
6	14 August 1941	17:52	V-11 (Il-2)		15	14 November 1941	14:58	I-18 (MiG-1)	
7	25 August 1941	12:10	I-16		16	14 November 1941	15:15	I-18 (MiG-1)	6 km (3.7 mi) south of Moscow
8	26 August 1941	08:52	I-17 (MiG-1)		17	27 November 1941	10:10	BB-22	
9	26 August 1941	08:56	I-17 (MiG-1)						
– 4. Staffel of Jagdgeschwader 52 – On the Eastern Front — May 1942
18	23 May 1942	09:45	Il-2		23	26 May 1942	17:20	LaGG-3	
19	24 May 1942	17:07	I-153		24	26 May 1942	18:56	Il-2	north of Dudnikovka
20	25 May 1942	12:20	V-11 (Il-2)		25	28 May 1942	15:25	I-16	
21	25 May 1942	18:57	MiG-1		26	28 May 1942	15:30	I-16	
22	26 May 1942	05:25	LaGG-3		27	28 May 1942	18:35	Il-2	
– 5. Staffel of Jagdgeschwader 52 – On the Eastern Front — June 1942
28	1 June 1942	18:40	MiG-1		38	22 June 1942	07:00	Yak-1	
29	3 June 1942	14:28	LaGG-3		39? (Note: According to Mathews and Foreman. this clim is unconfirmed.)	22 June 1942	—	Yak-1	
30	9 June 1942	12:10	Pe-2		40	22 June 1942	09:50	Yak-1	
31	9 June 1942	14:53	LaGG-3		41	22 June 1942	09:55	Yak-1	
32	13 June 1942	11:52	LaGG-3		42	23 June 1942	13:55	Yak-1	
33	13 June 1942	11:58	LaGG-3		43	24 June 1942	16:35	Yak-1	
34	14 June 1942	12:35	LaGG-3		44	24 June 1942	16:50	DB-3	
35	14 June 1942	12:39	LaGG-3		45	24 June 1942	16:58	Yak-1	
36	16 June 1942	13:30	LaGG-3		46	25 June 1942	19:10	LaGG-3	
37	21 June 1942	16:10	Yak-1						
– 4. Staffel of Jagdgeschwader 52 – On the Eastern Front — July – 21 August 1942
47	19 July 1942	18:21	LaGG-3		63	24 July 1942	08:37	Il-2	
48	19 July 1942	18:22	LaGG-3		64	24 July 1942	08:40	Il-2	
49	19 July 1942	18:24	LaGG-3		65	24 July 1942	15:10	Il-2	
50	20 July 1942	13:10	LaGG-3		66	26 July 1942	09:28	LaGG-3	
51	20 July 1942	13:15	LaGG-3		67	26 July 1942	09:30	LaGG-3	
52	21 July 1942	09:52	I-16		68♠	18 August 1942	09:50	LaGG-3	PQ 75424; 4 km (2.5 mi) east of Novorossiysk
53	22 July 1942	17:45	Hurricane		69♠	18 August 1942	09:58	LaGG-3	PQ 75454; Black Sea, 10 km (6.2 mi) south of Novorossiysk
54	22 July 1942	17:50	Hurricane		70♠	18 August 1942	16:00	LaGG-3	PQ 75422 northeast of Novorossiysk
55	22 July 1942	17:51	Hurricane		71♠	18 August 1942	16:05	LaGG-3	PQ 75424; 4 km (2.5 mi) east of Novorossiysk
56♠	23 July 1942	06:50	Il-2		72♠	18 August 1942	16:15	I-153	PQ 75421 northwest of Novorossiysk
57♠	23 July 1942	06:55	Il-2		73	21 August 1942	07:15	I-180 (MiG-3)	PQ 49284; 20–30 km (12–19 mi) east of Stalingrad
58♠	23 July 1942	11:05	Il-2		74	21 August 1942	09:48	LaGG-3	PQ 49432 vicinity of Srednyaya Akhtuba airfield
59♠	23 July 1942	11:10	Il-2		75	21 August 1942	10:15	LaGG-3	PQ 49492; 50 km (31 mi) southeast of Stalingrad
60♠	23 July 1942	11:15	Il-2		— ? (Note: This unconfirmed claim is not listed by Prien, Stemmer, Rodeike and Bock.)	21 August 1942	—	Boston	50 km (31 mi) southeast of Stalingrad
61♠	23 July 1942	11:17	Il-2		— ?	21 August 1942	—	Boston	50 km (31 mi) southeast of Stalingrad
62	24 July 1942	08:35	Il-2						

=== Awards ===
- Honour Goblet of the Luftwaffe on 6 July 1942 as Leutnant and pilot
- German Cross in Gold on 21 August 1942 as Leutnant in the 4./Jagdgeschwader 52 (Note: According to Obermaier on 7 September 1942.)
- Knight's Cross of the Iron Cross on 4 September 1942 as Leutnant and pilot in the 4./Jagdgeschwader 52
