= Gustav Denk =

German World War II fighter pilot

- Born: 24 January 1915; Soest
- Died: 13 February 1943 (aged 28); Chernigov
- Cause of death: Killed in action
- Military career
- Allegiance: Nazi Germany
- Branch: Luftwaffe
- Service years: 1939–1943
- Rank: Oberleutnant (first lieutenant)
- Unit: JG 52
- Commands: 5./JG 52, 6./JG 52
- Conflicts: See battles World War II: Invasion of Poland; Battle of France; Battle of Britain; Eastern Front; Operation Barbarossa; Operation Blue; Battle of the Caucasus †
- Awards: Knight's Cross of the Iron Cross

Gustav Denk (24 January 1915 – 13 February 1943) was a German military aviator who served in the Luftwaffe during World War II. As a fighter ace, he was credited with 67 aerial victories—that is, 67 aerial combat encounters resulting in the destruction of the enemy aircraft—claimed in over 500 combat missions. One aerial victories were claimed over the Western Front, the other victories were claimed over the Eastern Front.

Denk was born in Soest, and following fighter pilot training was posted to Jagdgeschwader 52 (JG 52—52nd Fighter Wing) in 1939. He claimed his first aerial victory on 13 July 1940 during the Battle of Britain. In 1941, his unit was transferred east where it participated in Operation Barbarossa, the German invasion of the Soviet Union. In January 1943, Denk was appointed Staffelkapitän (squadron leader) of 5. Staffel (5th squadron) of JG 52. On 13 February 1943, he was killed in action, shot down by Soviet anti-aircraft artillery near Chernigov. Posthumously, Denk was awarded the Knight's Cross of the Iron Cross on 14 March 1943.

== Career ==
Denk was born on 24 January 1915 in Soest in the Province of Westphalia of the German Empire. In late 1939, he was posted to II. Gruppe (2nd group) of Jagdgeschwader 52 (JG 52—52nd Fighter Wing), at the time headed by Hauptmann Hans-Günther von Kornatzki. On 27 June 1940, II. Gruppe moved to an airfield at Nordholz located approximately 10 kilometers (6.2 miles) south of Cuxhaven. Here on 13 July during the Battle of Britain, Denk claimed his first aerial victory when he shot down a Royal Air Force Bristol Blenheim bomber.

=== Operation Barbarossa ===
In preparation of Operation Barbarossa, the German invasion of the Soviet Union, II. Gruppe of JG 52, without a period of replenishment in Germany, was ordered to airfields close to the German-Soviet demarcation line. While the Gruppenstab (group headquarters unit) and 4. Staffel were based at Suwałki in northeastern Poland, 5. and 6. Staffel were transferred to a forward airfield at Sobolewo. For the invasion, II. Gruppe of JG 52 was subordinated to the Geschwaderstab (headquarters unit) of Jagdgeschwader 27 (JG 27—27th Fighter Wing). The Geschwader was part of the VIII. Fliegerkorps commanded by Generaloberst Wolfram Freiherr von Richthofen which supported the northern wing of Army Group Centre.

II. Gruppe was ordered to relocate to Soltsy, 30 kilometers (19 miles) west of Lake Ilmen, on 5 August in support of the 16th Army and Army Group North. Here, the Gruppe supported the fighting south of Lake Ilmen, and the German attacks on Shlisselburg, Leningrad and the Soviet fleet at Kronstadt. On 24 August, II. Gruppe was ordered to an airfield at Spasskaya Polist on the river Polist, south of Chudovo and north of Novgorod on Lake Ilmen, supporting the 18th Army in its advance towards the Neva and Lake Ladoga. Here Denk claimed his second aerial victory and first on the Eastern Front on 25 August when he shot down an I-18 fighter, an alternative Luftwaffe name for a Mikoyan-Gurevich MiG-1.

Since German forces had reached the proximity of Leningrad, II. Gruppe was ordered to Lyuban on 1 September, approximately 70 kilometers (43 miles) to Leningrad and located on the road to Moscow. The Gruppe stayed at Lyuban until 30 September, flying missions to Shlisselburg, Leningrad and Mga. Here Denk claimed a Polikarpov I-16 fighter on 7 September and a Polikarpov I-153 fighter on 21 September.

=== Eastern Front ===
In late January 1942, II. Gruppe was withdrawn from the Eastern Front and sent to Jesau near Königsberg for a period of recuperation and replenishment, arriving on 24 January 1942. In Jesau, the Gruppe received many factory-new Messerschmitt Bf 109 F-4 aircraft. On 14 April, II. Gruppe received orders to move to Pilsen, present-day Plzeň in the Czech Republic, for relocation to the Eastern Front. The Gruppe had also received a new commander, Hauptmann Erich Woitke had been transferred and was replaced by Hauptmann Johannes Steinhoff. The Gruppe then moved to Wien-Schwechat on 24 April before flying to Zürichtal, present-day Solote Pole, a village near the urban settlement Kirovske in the Crimea. There, II. Gruppe participated in Operation Trappenjagd, a German counterattack during the Battle of the Kerch Peninsula, launched on 8 May.

The Gruppe then moved to Maykop located in the North Caucasus on 21 September where, with the exception of 24 to 29 October, they were based until 26 November. Here, Denk claimed two aerial victories over Lavochkin-Gorbunov-Gudkov LaGG-3 fighters near Tuapse on 25 September, taking his total to 21 aerial victories. On 19 November, Soviet forces launched Operation Uranus which led to the encirclement of Axis forces in the vicinity of Stalingrad. To support the German forces fighting in the Battle of Stalingrad forced the Luftwaffe to relocate its forces and ordered II. Gruppe to move from Maykop to Morozovsk, located approximately 200 kilometers (120 miles) west of Stalingrad, on 26 November. By end of November 1942, Denk's number of aerial victories had increased to 36, making him the fifth most successful fighter pilot of II. Gruppe.

On 23 December, Denk received the German Cross in Gold (Deutsches Kreuz in Gold). On 30 December, the Gruppe was ordered to an airfield at Gigant, retreating from the advancing Soviet forces. There, the unit flew ground missions against the Soviet infantry as well as fighter escort missions for Luftwaffe Junkers Ju 87 dive bombers. On 22 January 1943, II. Gruppe had to retreat further and moved to an airfield at Rostov-on-Don. Operating from Rostov, Denk claimed a Petlyakov Pe-2 bomber on 26 January, a Polikarpov R-5 reconnaissance bomber on 27 January, two LaGG-3 fighters on 31 January, a Lavochkin La-5 fighter on 1 February, and another La-5 and a Yakovlev Yak-1 fighter the following day.

=== Squadron leader and death ===
In January 1943, Denk officially succeeded Oberleutnant Siegfried Simsch as Staffelkapitän (squadron leader) of 5. Staffel of JG 52. Simsch had been wounded in combat on 3 November 1942. The Staffel had then been temporarily led by Oberfeldwebel Willi Nemitz. On 7 February, the Gruppe moved to Kuteinykove near Stalino, present-day Donetsk, where Denk claimed a Yak-1 that day. On 10 February, he succeeded Hauptmann Rudolf Resch as Staffelkapitän of 6. Staffel of JG 52. That day, the Gruppe was moved to the combat area of the Kuban bridgehead where it was initially based at an airfield at Slavyansk-na-Kubani. The next day on 11 February, he claimed two Yak-1 fighters. On 12 February, Denk became an ace-in-a-day, claiming four I-153 fighters and a R-5 reconnaissance bomber.

On 13 February, Denk claimed his 67th and last aerial victory when he shot down a Douglas A-20 Havoc, also known as "Boston". He was then killed in action when he was shot down in his Bf 109 G-2 (Werknummer 14554—factory number) by anti-aircraft artillery over the Soviet airfield at Chernigov. He was posthumously awarded the Knight's Cross of the Iron Cross (Ritterkreuz des Eisernen Kreuzes) on 14 March 1943. Denk was succeeded by Nemitz as commander of 6. Staffel.

== Summary of career ==
=== Aerial victory claims ===
According to US historian David T. Zabecki, Denk was credited with 67 aerial victories. Spick also lists Denk with 67 aerial victories claimed in over 500 combat missions. Mathews and Foreman, authors of Luftwaffe Aces — Biographies and Victory Claims, researched the German Federal Archives and found records for 67 aerial victory claims, plus one further unconfirmed claim. All but two of his confirmed victories were claimed on the Eastern Front.

Victory claims were logged to a map-reference (PQ = Planquadrat), for example "PQ 95722". The Luftwaffe grid map (Jägermeldenetz) covered all of Europe, western Russia and North Africa and was composed of rectangles measuring 15 minutes of latitude by 30 minutes of longitude, an area of about 360 square miles (930 km^{2}). These sectors were then subdivided into 36 smaller units to give a location area 3 km × 4 km (1.9 mi × 2.5 mi) in size.

Chronicle of aerial victories
This and the ♠ (Ace of spades) indicates those aerial victories which made Denk an ace-in-a-day, a term which designates a fighter pilot who has shot down five or more airplanes in a single day. This and the – (dash) indicates unconfirmed aerial victory claims for which Denk did not receive credit. This and the ? (question mark) indicates information discrepancies listed by Prien, Stemmer, Rodeike, Bock, Mathews and Foreman.
Claim	Date	Time	Type	Location	Claim	Date	Time	Type	Location
– 6. Staffel of Jagdgeschwader 52 – Battle of Britain and on the English Channel — 26 June 1940 – 9 June 1941
1	13 July 1940	19:50	Blenheim	northwest of Borkum	—	1 May 1941	14:28	Blenheim	
– 6. Staffel of Jagdgeschwader 52 – Operation Barbarossa — 22 June – 6 November 1941
2	25 August 1941	16:35	I-18 (MiG-1)		4	21 September 1941	05:55	I-153	
3	7 September 1941	18:30	I-16						
– Stab II. Gruppe of Jagdgeschwader 52 – Eastern Front — 7 May 1942 – January 1943
5	9 May 1942	15:27	I-16		29	12 November 1942	14:04	I-16	PQ 95722; 20 km (12 mi) north-northeast of Tuapse
6	13 June 1942	10:27	LaGG-3		30	12 November 1942	14:06	Il-2	PQ 95753; 15 km (9.3 mi) east of Tuapse
7	22 August 1942	10:56	I-153	PQ 49334 south of Stalingrad	31	15 November 1942	09:14	Yak-1	PQ 94161, Lazarevskoye; 45 km (28 mi) southwest of Pavlovskaya
8	23 August 1942	05:40	LaGG-3	PQ 49661; 65 km (40 mi) southeast of Stalingrad	32	28 November 1942	12:06	Il-2	PQ 49382; 25 km (16 mi) south of Bassargino
9	23 August 1942	17:30	LaGG-3	PQ 49271; 5 km (3.1 mi) east of Stalingrad	33	28 November 1942	12:10	Il-2	PQ 49353 south of Bassargino
10	7 September 1942	12:05	I-16	PQ 44651	34	30 November 1942	13:09	Yak-1	PQ 39143; 35 km (22 mi) west-northwest of Kalach
11	9 September 1942	05:38	LaGG-3	PQ 54571 west of Bolkhov	35	30 November 1942	13:12	Yak-1	PQ 39153; 20 km (12 mi) northwest of Kalach
12	9 September 1942	14:04	LaGG-3	PQ 44444	36	30 November 1942	13:15	Il-2	PQ 29432 vicinity of Usawijnskij
13	9 September 1942	14:08	LaGG-3	PQ 44482	37	1 December 1942	08:57	P-40	PQ 39311; 30 km (19 mi) east-northeast of Oblivskaya
14	10 September 1942	14:07	LaGG-3	PQ 44153 vicinity of Wosnessnokaja	38	2 December 1942	12:14	Yak-1	PQ 49354 south of Bassargeno
15	12 September 1942	14:12? (Note: According to Mathews and Foreman claimed at 04:12 over a Lavochkin-Gorbunov-Gudkov LaGG-3.)	P-40?	PQ 49413, Krasnaya Sloboda south of Malgobek	39	2 December 1942	12:16	Il-2	PQ 49354 south of Bassargeno
16	16 September 1942	16:20	LaGG-3	PQ 54414, northeast of Kalinowskaja vicinity of Kalinowskaja	40	8 December 1942	09:45	Yak-1	PQ 39651; 35 km (22 mi) north of Shutow
17	16 September 1942	16:21	LaGG-3	PQ 54414, northeast of Kalinowskaja vicinity of Kalinowskaja	41	8 December 1942	09:46	Yak-1	PQ 39654, Nowy Jereskij; 35 km (22 mi) north of Shutow
18	18 September 1942	14:15	I-153	PQ 54412 vicinity of Kalinowskaja	42	8 December 1942	09:58	P-40	PQ 39491 vicinity of Nowij-Kut
19	18 September 1942	14:16	I-153	PQ 54412 vicinity of Kalinowskaja	43	18 December 1942	10:33	Yak-1	PQ 39823 vicinity of Gromosslawka
20	25 September 1942	16:30	LaGG-3	PQ 95763, Tuapse	44	18 December 1942	10:34	Yak-1	PQ 39733; 30 km (19 mi) northwest of Shutow
21	25 September 1942	16:31	LaGG-3	PQ 95763, Tuapse	45	19 December 1942	13:14	La-5	PQ 49534; 35–40 km (22–25 mi) south of Stalingrad
22	26 October 1942	14:20	Yak-1	PQ 44784	46	19 December 1942	13:15	Yak-1	PQ 49641; 45 km (28 mi) south-southeast of Stalingrad
23	30 October 1942	12:33	Yak-1	PQ 94161, Lazarevskoye	47	19 December 1942	13:17	Yak-1	PQ 49671; 50 km (31 mi) south-southeast of Stalingrad
24	30 October 1942	12:37	Yak-1	PQ 94161, Lazarevskoye	48	20 December 1942	10:54	Il-2	PQ 39853
25	2 November 1942	11:56	LaGG-3	PQ 94152	49	22 December 1942	10:51? (Note: According to Mathews and Foreman claimed at 00:51.)	La-5	PQ 39823, north of Vasilyevka vicinity of Gromosslawka
26	2 November 1942	11:56	LaGG-3	PQ 94152	50	26 December 1942	10:28? (Note: According to Mathews and Foreman claimed at 00:28.)	La-5	PQ 39812; 25 km (16 mi) northwest of Shutow
27	3 November 1942	11:32	Pe-2	PQ 94481	51	28 December 1942	10:27	La-5	PQ 38351, north of Kotelnikowo
28	3 November 1942	12:00	LaGG-3	PQ 94152					
– 5. Staffel of Jagdgeschwader 52 – Eastern Front — January – 3 February 1943
52	26 January 1943	10:35	Pe-2	PQ 08613	56	1 February 1943	12:00	La-5	PQ 18544
53	27 January 1943	14:25	R-5	PQ 07442	57	2 February 1943	06:50	La-5	PQ 12842; 20 km (12 mi) west-northwest of Neshin
54	31 January 1943	13:07	LaGG-3	PQ 99601	58	2 February 1943	13:32	Yak-1	PQ 08843
55	31 January 1943	13:10	LaGG-3	PQ 99541					
– 5. Staffel of Jagdgeschwader 52 – Eastern Front — 4 – 10 February 1943
59	7 February 1943	12:54	Yak-1	PQ 34 Ost 99662; 5 km (3.1 mi) east of Rovenki					
– 6. Staffel of Jagdgeschwader 52 – Eastern Front — 10 – 13 February 1943
60	11 February 1943	06:00	Yak-1	PQ 34 Ost 8646	64♠	12 February 1943	14:35	I-153	PQ 34 Ost 85482 vicinity of Schabonowskoja
61	11 February 1943	06:02	Yak-1	PQ 34 Ost 8649	65♠	12 February 1943	14:37	I-153	PQ 34 Ost 85624; Lake south of Nowo-Michajlowskoje
62♠	12 February 1943	07:50	I-153	PQ 34 Ost 85174 west of Eriwanskaja	66♠	12 February 1943	14:42	R-5	PQ 34 Ost 85833; Oljginka
63♠	12 February 1943	07:53	I-153	PQ 34 Ost 85311 vicinity of Schapssugskaja	67	13 February 1943	09:38	Boston	PQ 34 Ost 86522; Storo-Dsherilijewskaja

=== Awards ===
- Iron Cross (1939) 2nd and 1st Class
- Honor Goblet of the Luftwaffe on 2 November 1942 as Leutnant and pilot
- German Cross in Gold on 23 December 1942 as Leutnant in the II./Jagdgeschwader 52
- Knight's Cross of the Iron Cross on 14 March 1943 as Oberleutnant and pilot in the II./Jagdgeschwader 52
