= Rudolf Resch =

German World War II fighter pilot (1914–1943)

- Born: 7 April 1914; Kamenz
- Died: 11 July 1943 (aged 29); Oryol
- Cause of death: Killed in action
- Military career
- Allegiance: Nazi Germany
- Branch: Luftwaffe
- Service years: 1934–1943
- Rank: Major (major)
- Units: J/88, Condor Legion; JG 77, JG 52, JG 51
- Commands: 3./JG 77, 6./JG 52, IV./JG 51
- Conflicts: See battles: Spanish Civil War; World War II Battle of France Battle of Britain Eastern Front Operation Barbarossa Second Battle of Kharkov Battle of the Caucasus Battle of Kursk †
- Awards: Spanish Cross in Gold with Swords; Knight's Cross of the Iron Cross

Rudolf Resch (7 April 1914 – 11 July 1943) was a German Luftwaffe military aviator during the Spanish Civil War and World War II, a fighter ace listed with 94 enemy aircraft shot down. A flying ace or fighter ace is a military aviator credited with shooting down five or more enemy aircraft during aerial combat. He was credited with one aerial during the Spanish Civil War and further 93 on the Eastern Front of World War II.

Born in Kamenz, Resch volunteered for service with the Condor Legion during the Spanish Civil War where he was assigned to Jagdgruppe 88 (J/88—88th Fighter Group). Following service in Spain, Resch was posted to Jagdgeschwader 77 (JG 77—77th Fighter Wing) and became a Staffelkapitän (squadron leader). Serving in the Battle of France and Battle of Britain, he was then transferred to Jagdgeschwader 52 (JG 52—52nd Fighter Wing). He claimed his first aerial victory of World War II on 22 June 1941, the day German forces launched Operation Barbarossa, the invasion of the Soviet Union. On 6 September 1942, Resch was awarded the Knight's Cross of the Iron Cross after 58 aerial victories claimed in World War II.

Resch was appointed Gruppenkommandeur (group commander) of IV. Gruppe (4th group) of Jagdgeschwader 51 "Mölders" (JG 51—51st Fighter Wing) on 1 March 1943. He was killed in action on 11 July 1943, when he was shot down near Oryol during the Battle of Kursk.

== Early life and career ==
Resch was born on 7 April 1914 in Kamenz, at the time in the Kingdom of Saxony, part of the German Empire. His father was a professor of Slavic studies at the Dresden University of Technology. In early 1938, he joined the Condor Legion and was posted to 2. Staffel (2nd squadron) of Jagdgruppe 88 (J/88—88th Fighter Group) as a fighter pilot. On 17 July, he claimed an aerial victory over a Polikarpov I-15 fighter aircraft. On 14 April 1939, he was awarded the Spanish Cross in Gold with Swords (Spanienkreuz in Gold mit Schwertern), for his service in the Spanish Civil War. Following his return to Germany, he served as an instructor at the Jagdfliegerschule Schleißheim, the fighter pilot school at Schleißheim.

== World War II ==
World War II in Europe began on Friday 1 September 1939 when German forces invaded Poland. Resch was appointed Staffelkapitän (squadron leader) of 3. Staffel of Jagdgeschwader 77 (JG 77—77th Fighter Wing) in April 1940 during the "Phoney War" period of World War II. He replaced Oberleutnant Werner Eichel. The Staffel belonged to I. Gruppe (1st group) of JG 77, at the time based in Odendorf, preparing for the upcoming Battle of France. During the Battle of Britain on 31 August, Resch made a forced landing in his Messerschmitt Bf 109 E-1 (Werknummer 3642—factory number) following aerial combat with the Royal Air Force (RAF) over the Thames Estuary.

On 6 October 1940, Resch was transferred and made Staffelkapitän of 6. Staffel of Jagdgeschwader 52 (JG 52—52nd Fighter Wing). He replaced Oberleutnant Werner Lederer in this function who was transferred. The Staffel was subordinated to II. Gruppe of JG 52 which was headed by Hauptmann Wilhelm Ensslen. In consequence, command of his former 3. Staffel of JG 77 passed on to Oberleutnant Karl-Gottfried Nordmann. At the time, the Gruppe was based at Peuplingues near the English Channel and fighting the RAF during the Battle of Britain. II. Gruppe was withdrawn from the Channel Front on 2 November and moved to München Gladbach, present-day Mönchengladbach, on 5 November for a period of rest and replenishment. The Gruppe had also lost its commanding officer, Ensslen, who was killed in action on 2 November. Ensslen was replaced by Hauptmann Erich Woitke. On 22 December, II. Gruppe was ordered to Leeuwarden Airfield where they were tasked with flying fighter patrols along the Dutch North Sea coast. On 15 January 1941, the Gruppe moved to Ypenburg Airfield where they stayed until 10 February.

=== Operation Barbarossa ===
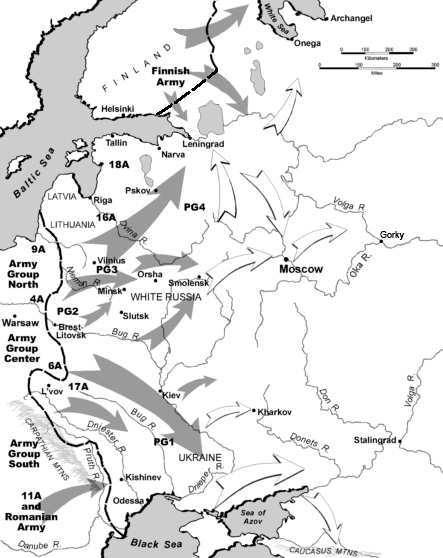
Map indicating Operation Barbarossa's attack plan

In preparation of Operation Barbarossa, the German invasion of the Soviet Union, II. Gruppe of JG 52, without a period of replenishment in Germany, was ordered to airfields close to the German-Soviet demarcation line. While the Gruppenstab (group headquarters unit) and 4. Staffel were based at Suwałki in northeastern Poland, 5. and 6. Staffel were transferred to a forward airfield at Sobolewo. For the invasion, II. Gruppe of JG 52 was subordinated to the Geschwaderstab (headquarters unit) of Jagdgeschwader 27 (JG 27—27th Fighter Wing). The Geschwader was part of the VIII. Fliegerkorps commanded by Generaloberst Wolfram Freiherr von Richthofen which supported the northern wing of Army Group Centre.

On 22 June, the German forces launched the attack on the Soviet Union which opened the Eastern Front. That day, Resch claimed his first aerial victory of World War II. He was credited with shooting down a Tupolev SB-2 bomber in the afternoon. On 25 June, the Gruppe moved to an airfield at Varėna in Lithuania which had previously been occupied by the Soviet Air Forces (VVS—Voyenno-Vozdushnye Sily). Two days later, the Gruppe moved to Maladzyechna, supporting the advance Panzergruppe 3 near Barysaw. Flying from this airfield, Resch claimed an Ilyushin DB-3 bomber shot down on 2 July. Two days later, the Gruppe moved to Sloboda, east of Minsk, before moving to an airfield named Lepel-West at Lyepyel on 5 July. From this airfield, II. Gruppe flew combat air patrols and fighter escort missions to combat areas near Vitebsk and Haradok, supporting Panzergruppe 2 and 3 in their advance to Vitebsk and Polotsk. Here, Resch claimed the destruction of a SB-3 bomber on 7 July. On 12 July, the Gruppe moved to Kamary, an airfield in the western parts of Vitebsk. Resch shot down a SB-2 bomber on 17 July. On 22 July, II. Gruppe advanced to the airfield Andrejewka near Smolensk where it stayed until 5 August. Operating from Andrejewka, Resch shot down another SB-2 bomber on 27 July.

II. Gruppe was ordered to relocate to Soltsy, 30 kilometers (19 miles) west of Lake Ilmen, on 5 August in support of the 16th Army and Army Group North. Here, the Gruppe supported the fighting south of Lake Ilmen, and the German attacks on Shlisselburg, Leningrad and the Soviet fleet at Kronstadt. Operating from Soltsy, Resch claimed one Mikoyan-Gurevich MiG-1 fighter shot down on 16 and 19 August. On 24 August, II. Gruppe was ordered to an airfield at Spasskaya Polist on the river Polist, south of Chudovo and north of Novgorod on Lake Ilmen, supporting the 18th Army in its advance towards the Neva and Lake Ladoga. Resch claimed three MiG-1 fighters while flying from Spasskaya Polist, one on 25 August and two the following day. Since German forces had reached the proximity of Leningrad, II. Gruppe was ordered to Lyuban, approximately 70 kilometers (43 miles) to Leningrad and located on the road to Moscow. The Gruppe stayed at Lyuban until 30 September, flying missions to Shlisselburg, Leningrad and Mga. Fighting in this combat area, Resch claimed six aerial victories in September 1941. On 2 September, he was credited with the destruction of a MiG-1 fighter followed by a Polikarpov R-5 reconnaissance bomber on 5 September followed by another MiG-1 fighter on 11 September. The following day, he claimed another MiG-1 fighter, followed by two further MiG-1 fighters shot down on 26 and 27 September.

On 2 October, German forces launched Operation Typhoon, the failed strategic offensive to capture Moscow. In support of this offensive, II. Gruppe was moved to Stabna, located just north of Smolensk. Operating from Stabna, Resch shot down a Mig-1 fighter on 3 October and a Polikarpov I-16 fighter 12 kilometers (7.5 miles) south of Rzhev on 8 October. On 12 October, II. Gruppe was ordered to Novodugino where it stayed for four days. The Gruppe then moved to an airfield west of Kalinin, present-day Tver, on 16 October. The following day, Resch claimed two MiG-1 fighters and two DB-3 bombers on 18 October. These were his last claims in 1941. He was awarded the Honour Goblet of the Luftwaffe (Ehrenpokal der Luftwaffe) on 20 December 1941.

=== Eastern Front ===
In late January 1942, II. Gruppe was withdrawn from the Eastern Front and sent to Jesau near Königsberg for a period of recuperation and replenishment, arriving on 24 January 1942. In Jesau, the Gruppe received many factory new Bf 109 F-4 aircraft. On 14 April, II. Gruppe received orders to move to Pilsen, present-day Plzeň in the Czech Republic, for relocation to the Eastern Front. The Gruppe had also received a new commander, Woitke had been transferred and was replaced by Hauptmann Johannes Steinhoff who thus became Resch's commanding officer. Following a series of relocations, including a short deployment on the Crimea where Resch claimed an Ilyushin Il-2 ground attack aircraft on 8 May. The Gruppe was then ordered to the airfield named Kharkov-Waitschenko on 14 May and participated in the Second Battle of Kharkov. The next day, Resch was credited with shooting down a Polikarpov I-153 fighter. On 16 May, the Gruppe moved to Artyomovsk, present-day Bakhmut, where they stayed until 23 May supporting German forces fighting in the Battle of Kharkov. Operating from Artyomovsk, Resch shot down a MiG-1 fighter on 20 May, and one on 21 and 22 May each. On 23 May, the Gruppe was ordered to relocate to Barvinkove. There, Resch claimed a Vultee V-11 attack aircraft and a Petlyakov Pe-2 bomber on 26 May.

On 1 June, II. Gruppe moved to an airfield at Grakowo, located approximately halfway between Kharkov and Kupiansk. The main German objectives in that combat area were, breakthrough to the upper Don and capture of Voronezh. Resch claimed the destruction of an Il-2 ground attack aircraft that day. On 10 June, he was credited with two aerial victories, a further Il-2 aircraft, and a MiG-1 fighter. Three days later, he claimed two Lavochkin-Gorbunov-Gudkov LaGG-3 fighters destroyed. Flying Bf 109 F-4/R1 (Werknummer 13358), Resch was wounded in combat on 21 June near Sochorowka. On 26 June, the Gruppe moved to an airfield at Bilyi Kolodyaz, approximately 10 kilometers (6.2 miles) southeast of Vovchansk, and to an airfield named Ssowy south of Kursk on 3 July, before returning to Artemovsk on 8 July. On 14 July, II. Gruppe again relocated, this time south to Chatzepetowka, and then on 17 July to Taganrog located on the Sea of Azov. There, Resch shot down a LaGG-3 fighter on 19 July, and two further LaGG-3 fighters the following day. On 22 July, II. Gruppe moved to an airfield named Nowy-Cholan, south of Tatsinskaya, where the Gruppe flew combat air patrols. There, Resch claimed a Sukhoi Su-2 aircraft shot down on 24 July. The next day, he claimed an I-153 fighter, an I-16 fighter and a LaGG-3 fighter. For 40 aerial victories claimed to date, he was awarded the German Cross in Gold (Deutsches Kreuz in Gold) on 27 July 1942.

Following several relocations, II. Gruppe was ordered to Tusov on 20 August. Located approximately 25 kilometers (16 miles) southwest of Kalach-na-Donu on the western bank of the Don, the Gruppe operated in the combat area of Stalingrad. Until end of August, Resch claimed ten further aerial victories. He shot down a LaGG-3 fighter on 23 August, the next day he claimed a Mikoyan-Gurevich MiG-3 fighter. On 25 August, a Yakovlev Yak-1 fighter and LaGG-3 fighter fell to his guns, followed by one LaGG-3 fighter on 26, 27, 28, 29, 30 and 31 August, respectively. Resch was awarded the Knight's Cross of the Iron Cross (Ritterkreuz des Eisernen Kreuzes) on 6 September 1942 for 50 aerial victories claimed.

=== Group commander ===
Resch was appointed Gruppenkommandeur (group commander) of IV. Gruppe of Jagdgeschwader 51 "Mölders" (JG 51—51st Fighter Wing) on 1 March 1943. He replaced Hauptmann Johann Knauth who was transferred. Command of his former 6. Staffel of JG 52 was passed on to Oberleutnant Gustav Denk. His three squadron leaders were, Oberleutnant Horst-Günther von Fassong heading 10. Staffel, Hauptmann Adolf Borchers in charge of 11. Staffel, and Hauptmann Wilhelm Moritz leading 12. Staffel. The Gruppe had just completed conversion from the Bf 109 F-2 to the Focke-Wulf Fw 190 A-4 and was based at Smolensk. In that combat area, Army Group Centre had launched Operation Büffel, a series of retreats eliminating the Rzhev salient. On 21 March, IV. Gruppe was ordered to Bryansk where it was deployed over the left wing of Army Group Centre. On 23 March, Resch claimed his first aerial victory as Gruppenkommandeur when he shot down a LaGG-3 fighter northeast of Zhizdra.

On the afternoon of 11 April, IV. Gruppe escorted 16 Junkers Ju 87 dive bombers from III. Gruppe of Sturzkampfgeschwader 1 (StG 1—1st Dive Bomber Wing) on a bombing mission to various targets near Kursk. On this mission, Resch claimed two LaGG-3 fighters shot down north of Kursk. The Gruppe flew missions to the combat area south and southeast of Oryol on 25 April. That day, Resch claimed a MiG-3 fighter shot down. The following day, the Gruppe was ordered to the airfield named Sjablowo, a satellite airfield near Oryol. On 7 May, large Soviet bomber and ground attack aircraft units attacked Luftwaffe airfields in the area of Oryol and Bryansk. Defending against this attack, Resch was credited with destruction of an Il-2 ground attack aircraft. Resch was then credited with shooting down a Yak-1 fighter east of Verkhovye on 11 May. The following day, he claimed a LaGG-3 shot down south Oryol, the only claim by IV. Gruppe that day. On 2 June, IV. Gruppe flew escort missions and combat air patrols to Kursk. Without loss, IV. Gruppe pilots claimed 13 aerial victories, including two LaGG-3 fighters by Resch. Combat on 8 June, led the Gruppe to an area east and southeast of Oryol. On two separate missions, Resch shot down a LaGG-3 fighter in the morning and a La-5 fighter later that evening.

=== Operation Citadel and death ===
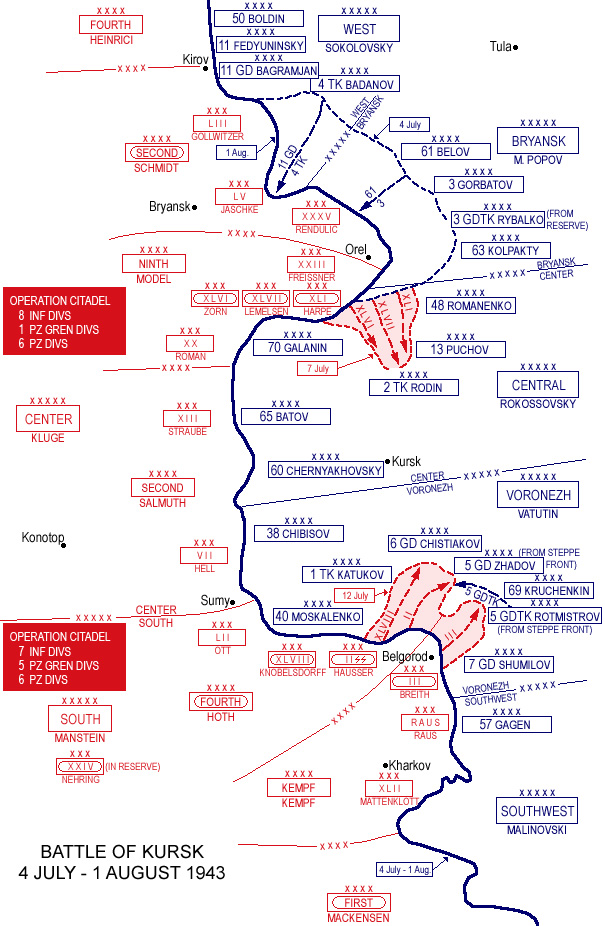
German penetration during the Battle of Kursk

On 5 July, German forces launched Operation Citadel in a failed attempt to eliminate the Kursk salient that initiated the Battle of Kursk. In preparation of this operation, IV. Gruppe was ordered to an airfield named Oryol-West and supported Generaloberst Walter Model's 9th Army on the northern pincer. That day, pilots of the Gruppe flew up to five combat missions in the combat area near Maloarkhangelsk. The Gruppe escorted bombers from Kampfgeschwader 4 (KG 4—4th Bomber Wing), KG 51 and KG 53 as well as Ju 87 dive bombers from StG 1. The Gruppe claimed 36 aerial victories that day, including two La-5 fighters by Resch, one northeast of Maloarkhangelsk and another south-southeast of Trosna.

In the early morning of 6 July, Resch shot down Leytnant Yevgeniy Stepanov from the 157 IAP (Fighter Aviation Regiment—Istrebitelny Aviatsionny Polk). On 8 July, the Gruppe flew multiple missions in support of the Army near Ponyri as well as escort missions for Ju 87 dive bombers from StG 1. In their defense, Resch shot down a Yak-1 fighter west of Livny and a La-5 fighter west of Maloarkhangelsk. The next day, the 9th Army was fighting near Olkhovatka and Ponyri. The Gruppe claimed 24 aerial victories, including a LaGG-3 fighter and an Il-2 ground attack aircraft by Resch. On 11 July, Resch claimed another Il-2 ground attack aircraft. He was then shot down and killed in action in his Fw 190 A-5 (Werknummer 7264) near Judinka, the combat area near Maloarkhangelsk. Command of IV. Gruppe was temporarily given to Hauptmann Wilhelm Moritz before Major Hans-Ekkehard Bob took command of the Gruppe on 1 August.

== Summary of career ==
=== Aerial victory claims ===
According to US historian David T. Zabecki, Resch was credited with 93 aerial victories during World War II. Spick lists Resch with 94 aerial victories claimed in an unknown number combat missions. This figure includes 93 aerial victories on the Eastern Front, and one further victory during the Spanish Civil War. Mathews and Foreman, authors of Luftwaffe Aces — Biographies and Victory Claims, researched the German Federal Archives and found documentation for 93 aerial victory claims. This number includes one claim during the Spanish Civil War and 65 on the Eastern Front.

Victory claims were logged to a map-reference (PQ = Planquadrat), for example "PQ 44243". The Luftwaffe grid map (Jägermeldenetz) covered all of Europe, western Russia and North Africa and was composed of rectangles measuring 15 minutes of latitude by 30 minutes of longitude, an area of about 360 square miles (930 km^{2}). These sectors were then subdivided into 36 smaller units to give a location area 3 km × 4 km (1.9 mi × 2.5 mi) in size.

Chronicle of aerial victories
This and the ? (question mark) indicates information discrepancies listed by Prien, Stemmer, Rodeike, Bock, Mathews and Foreman.
Claim	Date	Time	Type	Location	Claim	Date	Time	Type	Location
– 2. Staffel of Jagdgruppe 88 – Spanish Civil War
1	17 July 1938	—	I-15						
– 6. Staffel of Jagdgeschwader 52 – Operation Barbarossa — 22 June – 5 December 1941
2	22 June 1941	16:30	SB-2		13	5 September 1941	18:30	R-5	
3? (Note: This claim is not listed by Prien, Stemmer, Rodeike and Bock.)	2 July 1941	19:27	DB-3	Lukamly	14	11 September 1941	08:53	I-18 (MiG-1)	
4	7 July 1941	05:50	SB-3		15	12 September 1941	09:15	I-18 (MiG-1)	east of Szarja
5	17 July 1941	13:12	SB-2		16	26 September 1941	10:19	I-18 (MiG-1)	
6	27 July 1941	11:18	SB-2		17	27 September 1941	11:40	I-18 (MiG-1)	
7	16 August 1941	05:46	I-18 (MiG-1)		18	3 October 1941	15:50	I-18 (MiG-1)	
8	19 August 1941	06:51	I-18 (MiG-1)		19	8 October 1941	12:10	I-16	12 km (7.5 mi) south of Rzhev
9	25 August 1941	12:57	I-18 (MiG-1)		20	17 October 1941	15:45	I-18 (MiG-1)	
10	26 August 1941	16:32	I-18 (MiG-1)		21	17 October 1941	15:55	I-18 (MiG-1)	
11	26 August 1941	16:35	I-18 (MiG-1)		22	18 October 1941	09:45	DB-3	
12	2 September 1941	12:15	I-18 (MiG-1)		23	18 October 1941	09:50	DB-3	
– 6. Staffel of Jagdgeschwader 52 – Eastern Front — 7 May 1942 – 3 February 1943
24	8 May 1942	12:10	Il-2		50	29 August 1942	13:14	LaGG-3	PQ 44243; 10 km (6.2 mi) northeast of Stalingrad
25	15 May 1942	18:40	I-153		51	30 August 1942	13:15	LaGG-3	PQ 49213 northeast of Grebenka
26	20 May 1942	13:35	MiG-1	southeast of Gussarowka	52	31 August 1942	09:38? (Note: According to Mathews and Foreman claimed at 08:50.)	LaGG-3	PQ 49533; 35–40 km (22–25 mi) south of Stalingrad
27	21 May 1942	18:30	MiG-1		53	7 September 1942	06:04	LaGG-3	PQ 44453 south of Mozdok
28	22 May 1942	07:30	MiG-1		54	7 September 1942	09:30? (Note: According to Mathews and Foreman claimed at 09:50.)	MiG-1	PQ 44634
29	26 May 1942	14:30	V-11 (Il-2)		55	8 September 1942	13:35? (Note: According to Mathews and Foreman claimed at 13:30.)	R-5	PQ 44634
30	26 May 1942	15:36	Pe-2		56	12 September 1942	16:45	LaGG-3	PQ 44613
31	1 June 1942	09:25	Il-2		57	17 September 1942	07:00	MiG-1	PQ 44633
32	10 June 1942	13:15	Il-2	north of Bakejewka	58	17 September 1942	11:45	LaGG-3	PQ 54374
33	10 June 1942	18:25	MiG-1		59	23 September 1942	12:25	I-153	PQ 95551; 30 km (19 mi) north of Tuapse
34	13 June 1942	10:32	LaGG-3		60	5 October 1942	14:30? (Note: According to Mathews and Foreman claimed at 14:50.)	Yak-1	PQ 95723
35	13 June 1942	17:15	LaGG-3		61	6 October 1942	09:42	Pe-2	PQ 95693; 40 km (25 mi) south-southwest of Maykop
36	19 July 1942	11:43	LaGG-3		62	10 October 1942	15:15	Yak-1	PQ 95722; 20 km (12 mi) north-northeast of Tuapse
37	20 July 1942	08:45	LaGG-3		63	11 October 1942	13:40	Yak-1	PQ 95747 vicinity of Tuapse
38	20 July 1942	08:55	LaGG-3		64	11 October 1942	13:48	Yak-1	PQ 95783; 15 km (9.3 mi) southeast of Tuapse
39	24 July 1942	07:05	Su-2 (Seversky)	PQ 18562	65	16 October 1942	12:35	Yak-1	PQ 94132
40	25 July 1942	08:00	I-153	PQ 18842; 40 km (25 mi) west-northwest of Mykolaiv	66	29 October 1942	15:35	Yak-1	PQ 95722; 20 km (12 mi) north-northeast of Tuapse
41	25 July 1942	08:28	I-16	PQ 18391	67	7 January 1943	13:45	La-5	PQ 28762
42	25 July 1942	08:35	LaGG-3	PQ 18384	68	10 January 1943	06:20	La-5	PQ 27121 east of Mykolaiv
43	23 August 1942	09:00	LaGG-3	PQ 49193; Stalingrad	69	10 January 1943	06:21	La-5	PQ 27121 east of Mykolaiv
44	24 August 1942	12:30	MiG-3	PQ 44352; 10 km (6.2 mi) northeast of Stalingrad	70	26 January 1943	11:30	La-5	PQ 0864
45	25 August 1942	12:40	Yak-1	PQ 59171	71	30 January 1943	07:13	La-5	PQ 08681, southwest of Ssaraiski
46	25 August 1942	17:30	LaGG-3	PQ 49112; 15 km (9.3 mi) east of Stalingrad	72	30 January 1943	07:55	La-5	PQ 08691
47	26 August 1942	08:30	LaGG-3	PQ 49244; 10 km (6.2 mi) northeast of Stalingrad	73	30 January 1943	12:45	La-5	PQ 0883
48	27 August 1942	12:14	LaGG-3	PQ 49273; 15 km (9.3 mi) east of Stalingrad	74	2 February 1943	08:10	Yak-1	PQ 1867
49	28 August 1942	05:15	LaGG-3	PQ 49221; 25 km (16 mi) northeast of Stalingrad	75	2 February 1943	13:30	Yak-1	PQ 08732; 20 km (12 mi) southeast of Novocherkassk
– Stab IV. Gruppe of Jagdgeschwader 51 "Mölders" – Eastern Front — 4 February – 11 July 1943
76	23 March 1943	14:35	LaGG-3	PQ 35 Ost 44262; 20 km (12 mi) northeast of Zhizdra	85	8 June 1943	19:40	La-5	PQ 35 Ost 63122; 10 km (6.2 mi) east of Oryol
77	11 April 1943	14:10	LaGG-3	PQ 35 Ost 62181; 10 km (6.2 mi) north of Kursk	86	5 July 1943	18:35	La-5	PQ 35 Ost 63612; 5 km (3.1 mi) northeast of Maloarkhangelsk
78	11 April 1943	14:12	LaGG-3	PQ 35 Ost 62181; 10 km (6.2 mi) north of Kursk	87	5 July 1943	18:59	La-5	PQ 35 Ost 63572; 20 km (12 mi) south-southeast of Trosna
? (Note: This claim is not listed by Mathews and Foreman.)	25 April 1943	10:35	MiG-3	PQ 35 Ost 53482	88	6 July 1943	06:25	Yak-1	PQ 35 Ost 63563; 10 km (6.2 mi) west of Maloarkhangelsk
79	7 May 1943	05:15	Il-2	PQ 35 Ost 54862; 20 km (12 mi) north-northwest of Oryol	89	8 July 1943	08:05	Yak-1	PQ 35 Ost 73574; 20 km (12 mi) west of Livny
80	11 May 1943	18:05	Yak-1	PQ 35 Ost 73163; 15 km (9.3 mi) east of Verkhovye	90	8 July 1943	09:55	La-5	PQ 35 Ost 63553; 15 km (9.3 mi) west of Maloarkhangelsk
81	12 May 1943	08:15	LaGG-3	PQ 35 Ost 63592; 15 km (9.3 mi) south-southwest of Maloarkhangelsk	91	9 July 1943	08:34	LaGG-3	PQ 35 Ost 63574; 20 km (12 mi) south-southeast of Trosna
82	2 June 1943	03:53	LaGG-3	PQ 35 Ost 62113; 25 km (16 mi) north-northwest of Kursk	92	9 July 1943	08:36	Il-2	PQ 35 Ost 63573; 20 km (12 mi) south-southeast of Trosna
83	2 June 1943	10:43	LaGG-3	PQ 35 Ost 63793; 15 km (9.3 mi) south-southwest of Zolotukhino	93	11 July 1943	11:50	Il-2	PQ 35 Ost 63393; 15 km (9.3 mi) north-northwest of Maloarkhangelsk
84	8 June 1943	09:36	LaGG-3	PQ 35 Ost 63414; 20 km (12 mi) southeast of Zmiyovka					

=== Awards ===
- Spanish Cross in Gold with Swords (14 April 1939)
- Honour Goblet of the Luftwaffe on 20 December 1941 as Hauptmann and Staffelkapitän
- German Cross in Gold on 27 July 1942 as Hauptmann in the 6./Jagdgeschwader 52
- Knight's Cross of the Iron Cross on 6 September 1942 as Hauptmann and Staffelkapitän of the 5./Jagdgeschwader 52 (Note: According to Scherzer as Staffelkapitän of the 6./Jagdgeschwader 52.)

== Notes ==
Military offices
Preceded by Hauptmann Hans Knauth	Commander of IV. Gruppe of Jagdgeschwader 51; 1 March 1943 – 11 July 1943	Succeeded by Major Hans-Ekkehard Bob
