= Heinz Schmidt (pilot) =

German World War II fighter pilot

- Born: 20 April 1920; Bad Homburg vor der Höhe, occupied Rhineland, French Third Republic
- Died: 5 September 1943 (aged 23) (MIA) near Kotelva, Ukrainian SSR
- Military career
- Allegiance: Nazi Germany
- Branch: Luftwaffe
- Service years: 1938–1943
- Rank: Hauptmann (captain)
- Nickname: Johnny
- Unit: JG 52
- Commands: 6./JG 52
- Conflicts: See battles World War II: Battle of Britain; Eastern Front; Operation Barbarossa; Battle of Moscow; Battle of the Kerch Peninsula; Battle of the Caucasus
- Awards: Knight's Cross of the Iron Cross with Oak Leaves

Heinz Schmidt (20 April 1920 – 5 September 1943) was a German Luftwaffe military aviator during World War II, a fighter ace credited with 173 enemy aircraft shot down in 712 combat missions. All of his victories were claimed over the Eastern Front.

Born in Bad Homburg vor der Höhe, Schmidt volunteered for military service in the Luftwaffe of Nazi Germany in 1938. Following flight training, he was posted to Jagdgeschwader 52 (JG 52—52nd Fighter Wing) in 1940. He flew his first combat missions in the Battle of Britain and claimed his first aerial victory in the opening phase of Operation Barbarossa, the German invasion of the Soviet Union. Following his 51st aerial victory he was awarded the Knight's Cross of the Iron Cross on 23 August 1942 and the Knight's Cross of the Iron Cross with Oak Leaves on 16 September 1942 after 102 victories.

In July 1943, Schmidt was appointed Staffelkapitän (squadron leader) of the 6. Staffel (6th squadron) of JG 52. Schmidt was posted as missing in action after aerial combat near Markor on 5 September 1943. It is believed that he was mistakenly shot down by Hungarian fighters operating in the same area. He was promoted to Hauptmann (captain) posthumously.

== Early life and career ==
Schmidt was born on 20 April 1920 in Bad Homburg vor der Höhe, the son of metal worker Adolf Schmidt. His friends called him Johnny. From Easter 1930, he attended the Realgymnasium—a secondary school built on the mid-level Realschule to achieve the Abitur (university entry qualification)—in Bad Homburg and graduated in March 1938. Aged 13, Schmidt joined the Hitlerjugend (HJ—Hitler Youth) where he attained the rank of Kameradschaftsführer (Comrade Unit Leader) and learned to fly glider aircraft.

After Schmidt completed his compulsory Reichsarbeitsdienst (RAD—Reich Labor Service) with RAD department 6/225 in Heubach/Schlüchtern, he joined the military service of the Luftwaffe with 3./Flieger-Ersatz-Abteilung 14 (3rd Company of Flier Replacement Unit 14) in Detmold on 10 November 1938. There he completed his recruit training and on 12 April 1939 began his pilot training. From 9 October 1939 to 15 May 1940, Schmidt attended the Flugzeugführerschule A/B (flight school for the pilot license) at Plauen, Saxony. (Note: Flight training in the Luftwaffe progressed through the levels A1, A2 and B1, B2, referred to as A/B flight training. A training included theoretical and practical training in aerobatics, navigation, long-distance flights and dead-stick landings. The B courses included high-altitude flights, instrument flights, night landings and training to handle the aircraft in difficult situations.) There he was promoted to Gefreiter (lance corporal) on 1 December 1939. Upon completion, Schmidt attended the Jagdfliegerschule 3 (3rd Fighter Pilot School). He began his training on 17 May 1940 with 2. Staffel (2nd squadron). After completing these training courses, he was assigned to the 2. Staffel of the Ergänzungs-Jagdgruppe Merseburg on 17 July 1940 for final fighter-pilot preparation.

== World War II ==
World War II in Europe had begun on 1 September 1939, when German forces invaded Poland. On 12 August 1940, Schmidt was transferred to 4. Staffel (4th squadron) of Jagdgeschwader 52 (JG 52—52nd Fighter Wing), commanded by Oberleutnant (First Lieutenant) Johannes Steinhoff. His II. Gruppe (2nd group) of JG 52 was, at that time, engaged in the Battle of Britain and was commanded by Hauptmann (Captain) Erich Woitke. During 12–18 August, Schmidt flew his first combat missions against England and then from 19 August to 23 September, defense of the Reich missions over the German Bight. For a short time (13–26 September), Schmidt served as a pilot in 5./JG 52 (5th squadron) before returning to 4. Staffel on 27 September. There, he was promoted to Obergefreiter (senior lance corporal) on 1 October and received the Iron Cross 2nd Class (Eisernes Kreuz 2. Klasse) on 22 October and the Iron Cross 1st Class (Eisernes Kreuz 1. Klasse) on 9 November.

II./JG 52 insignia

In early November, JG 52 was withdrawn from combat operations and relocated to Germany to recuperate and replenish their aircraft. There, Schmidt was promoted to Unteroffizier (subordinate officer or lance sergeant) on 1 December. The Geschwader returned to active service where Schmidt flew further defense of the Reich missions over the Netherlands from 27 December 1940 to 8 February 1941. He then again flew missions against England from 9–24 February, and again defensive missions, now over Belgium, from 25 February to 6 June. On 1 April, Schmidt was promoted to Feldwebel (sergeant) and became a Fähnrich (officer candidate).

=== Operation Barbarossa ===
On 9 June 1941, II. Gruppe of JG 52 was recalled from the Channel Front in preparation for Operation Barbarossa, the German invasion of the Soviet Union. Via stopovers in Münster, Lüneburg, Stargard and Elbing, present-day Elbląg, 4. Staffel was moved to an airfield at Suwałki, close to the German-Soviet demarcation line negotiated in the German–Soviet Frontier Treaty. For the invasion, II. Gruppe of JG 52 was subordinated to the Stab (headquarters unit) of Jagdgeschwader 27 (JG 27—27th Fighter Wing). The Geschwader was part of the VIII. Fliegerkorps commanded by Generaloberst Wolfram Freiherr von Richthofen and supported the northern wing of Army Group Centre. Schmidt claimed his first victory on 26 June 1941, an Ilyushin DB-3 bomber shot down at 14:27 near Varėna. He claimed a Polikarpov R-Z reconnaissance bomber on 3 July and two more DB-3 bombers, one on 3 and 4 July respectively. His fifth claim was made on his 116th combat mission of the war.

On 5 August, II. Gruppe was ordered to relocate to Soltsy, west of Lake Ilmen, in support of the 16th Army and Army Group North. The next day, II. Gruppe was ordered to an airfield at Spasskaya Polist, south of Chudovo and north of Lake Ilmen. On 12 August, Schmidt crash landed his Messerschmitt Bf 109 F-2 (Werknummer 5541—factory number) near Saklinja, approximately 70 kilometers (43 mi) into enemy territory, and spent six days evading capture until able to get back to the German lines, and his unit. He received the Front Flying Clasp of the Luftwaffe in Gold (Frontflugspange in Gold) on 22 August 1941. Schmidt claimed his fifth aerial victory on 25 August, a Polikarpov I-17 fighter aircraft shot down at 08:50 on a mission flown out of Spasskaya Polist, 40 km (25 mi) northeast of Novgorod. The next day at 08:56, he claimed another I-17 and on 27 August 1941, he was promoted to Oberfeldwebel (warrant officer second class).

On 29 August, Schmidt claimed his seventh and eighth victory in quick succession when he shot down two Polikarpov I-15 fighter aircraft at 15:10 and 15:11. On 2 September, II. Gruppe moved to Lyuban, staying there until end-September. From there, the Gruppe flew missions against Shlisselburg, Mga and Leningrad. Schmidt claimed his ninth victory, a Mikoyan-Gurevich MiG-1 referred to as I-18, at 11:55 on 7 September, and two DB-3 bombers at 17:25 and 17:32 on 8 September. His twelfth victory, another I-18, was then claimed at 07:50 on 11 September southeast of Lyby followed by one more I-18 at 09:56 the next day. II. Gruppe subordination to JG 27 ended on 20 October 1941 and was subsequently again put under the command of the Stab of JG 52. On 4 November, the Gruppe was moved to an airfield at Ruza, approximately 100 km (62 mi) west of Moscow and engaged in the Battle of Moscow. Schmidt claimed his last two aerial victories in 1941 in late November. On 26 November at 13:55, he shot down a DB-3 bomber, followed by a Lavochkin-Gorbunov-Gudkov LaGG-3, also referred to as a I-301 by the Germans, the next day at 13:04 100 km (62 mi) south of Klin.

=== Eastern Front ===
On 22 December, JG 52 was withdrawn from combat operations for a period of recuperation and replenishment and was moved to Jesau near Königsberg, arriving on 16 January 1942. Following the relocation, Schmidt was posted to the infantry on 19 January. This assignment ended on 27 February and he was then sent to Germany (28 February – 7 May 1942). During this period, Schmidt was commissioned, attaining the rank of Leutnant (second lieutenant). The infantry Kampfgruppe to which Schmidt had been assigned, consisted predominantly of ground personnel and a few pilots of II./JG 52. The unit was deployed in ground fighting at Dugino, approximately 200 km (120 mi) west of Moscow, where it suffered heavy casualties.

At Jesau, the Gruppe began upgrading their aircraft to the Bf 109 F-4. On 14 April 1942, II. Gruppe was ordered to Pilsen, where conversion to the Bf 109 F-4 completed. The unit then moved to Wien-Schwechat on 24 April before relocation to the Eastern Front on 4 May. Via multiple stopovers, the Gruppe was ordered to Zürichtal, present-day Solote Pole, a village near the urban settlement Kirovske in the Crimea. There, II. Gruppe engaged in combat in Operation Trappenjagd, a German operation in the Battle of the Kerch Peninsula, launched on 8 May 1942.

On the second day of the operation, Schmidt claimed his 16th victory, a MiG-1, at 08:45. Following three aerial victories on 4 July 1942, two LaGG-3s and one Hawker Hurricane, his score increased to 45 victories. This resulted in the presentation of the Honorary Cup of the Luftwaffe (Ehrenpokal der Luftwaffe) on 6 July 1942. Schmidt claimed his 50th victory, another LaGG-3 shot down at 06:06 on 19 July 1942, and his 51st, yet again a LaGG-3, at 10:16 on the next day. By the end of July, his tally of aerial victories had reached 64. Schmidt was promoted to Oberleutnant (first lieutenant) on 1 August 1942. As JG 52 continued to fight in the air battles in the advance toward Stalingrad, Schmidt was awarded the German Cross in Gold (Deutsches Kreuz in Gold) on 20 August 1942. Three days later, he was also honored with the Knight's Cross of the Iron Cross (Ritterkreuz des Eisernen Kreuzes). He had been nominated for these two awards following his 51st aerial victory and for having flown numerous ground attack missions.

=== Stalingrad ===
The Battle of Stalingrad began on 23 August 1942 when German forces began breaking out from the bridgehead across the Don River. The next day, Schmidt became an "ace-in-a-day" when he shot down seven LaGG-3s in combat over the outskirts of Stalingrad, taking his total to 82 aerial victories. Schmidt claimed three more LaGG-3s on 25 August and two I-180s on 27 August. Following two I-180s shot down on 28 August, two Il-2s on 30 August, and two LaGG-3s on 31 August, his total reached 93 victories. His next victories were claimed over two LaGG-3s on 7 September and three further LaGG-3s on 8 September. On 9 September, Schmidt shot down two Il-2s, taking his number of aerial victories to 100. He was the 21st Luftwaffe pilot to achieve the century-mark. This achievement was honored with the presentation of Knight's Cross of the Iron Cross with Oak Leaves (Ritterkreuz des Eisernen Kreuzes mit Eichenlaub) on 16 September in Germany for 102 aerial victories claimed. He was the 124th member of the German armed forces to be so honored.

Returning in late November, he was assigned to 6. Staffel, near Stalingrad, after the Soviets had launched Operation Uranus that encircled Axis forces fighting in and near the city. As the Germans were retreating back to Taganrog and Rostov, he scored his 125th victory on 7 January 1943. Eight days later, his Bf 109 G-2 (Werknummer 14556—factory number) fighter crashed after suffering engine problems. He was shot down again behind Russian lines in mid-February, returning to friendly territory after a two-day trek across the frozen Sea of Azov minus one fur-lined flying boot and with a smashed shoulder and dislocated right arm. Schmidt then spent five days at the field hospital before he was transferred to the Luftwaffen-Lazarett (military hospital) in Berlin, and was then sent to his hometown Reserve-Lazarett (reserve military hospital) in Bad Homburg.

=== Kuban, Kharkov and death ===
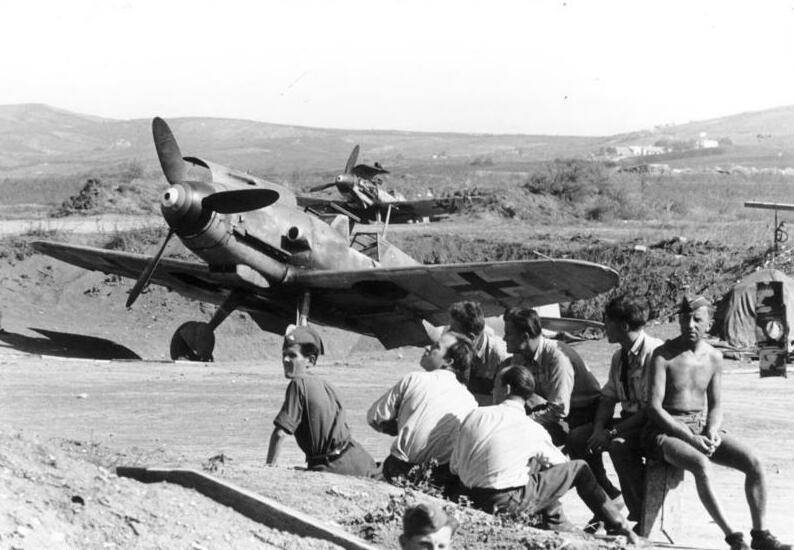
Bf 109s of II./JG 52 at Anapa

Following his convalescence, Schmidt returned to the Eastern Front and was briefly assigned to 4. Staffel before he was transferred to 6. Staffel on 23 July. At the time of his return, II. Gruppe was based at Mariupol, and fighting in the Kuban bridgehead as part of the Battle of the Caucasus. On 27 July, Schmidt was appointed Staffelkapitän (squadron leader) of 6. Staffel, replacing Oberleutnant Helmut Lipfert who had temporarily held this position following the death of Oberleutnant Karl Ritzenberger on 24 May. The next day, he claimed his 131st victory, a Bell P-39 Airacobra fighter. The military situation of Army Group South resulted in splitting the forces of II. Gruppe. All of 6. Staffel and parts of 5. Staffel were relocated to Kutejnykowe, approximately 14 km (8.7 mi) west of Amvrosiivka, on 1 August. This task force was put under the command of Oberleutnant Gerhard Barkhorn. Two days later, Soviet forced launched the Belgorod-Kharkov Offensive Operation resulting in another redeployment of JG 52. Now based at the Kharkov-Rogan airfield, southeast of Kharkov, Schmidt became an "ace-in-a-day" again. That day, he was credited with five aerial victories, an Il-2, three Yakovlev Yak-1 fighters and a Lavochkin La-5 fighter. On 11 August, the task force was ordered from Charkow-Rogan to Lebedyn. Here it provided fighter protection over the areas of operation between the 8th Army and 4th Panzer Army. This transfer detached the task force from the command of I. Gruppe, to which it had been assigned. Barkhorn, who at the time also served as acting Gruppenkommandeur (group commander), stayed with I. Gruppe. Command of the task force subsequently went to Schmidt. He achieved his 150th aerial victory the next day after claiming a pair of Yak-1s.

On 1 September, II. Gruppe was made complete again, reuniting with all three Staffeln at a makeshift airfield named Karlowka located approximately 50 kilometers (31 miles) east of Poltava. On 5 September, Schmidt claimed his 172nd and 173rd victories, a La-5 and an Il-2. These were his final claims before he was posted as missing in action after aerial combat near Markor, near Kotelva, that day. His Bf 109 G-6 aircraft 'Yellow 7' (Werknummer 15903—factory number) was possibly shot down in error by Hungarian fighters operating in the same area. At the time of his death, he was the highest-scoring fighter pilot of II. Gruppe. Authors Prien, Stemmer, Rodeike and Bock state that the circumstances about his death remain unanswered. They further speculate that the story about him having been shot down by friendly fighters could be a myth, created to uphold the illusion that he was killed undefeated by the enemy. Schmidt was posthumously promoted to Hauptmann. Command of 6. Staffel again went to Lipfert.

== Summary of career ==
=== Aerial victory claims ===
According to US historian David T. Zabecki, Schmidt was credited with 173 aerial victories. Obermaier and Spick also lists him with 173 aerial victories claimed in over 700 combat missions, and a mission-to-claim ratio of 4.05. Dixon states that Schmidt flew 712 combat missions. Mathews and Foreman, authors of Luftwaffe Aces — Biographies and Victory Claims, researched the German Federal Archives and found records for 173 aerial victories, all of which claimed on the Eastern Front.

Victory claims were logged to a map-reference (PQ = Planquadrat), for example "PQ 49241". The Luftwaffe grid map covered all of Europe, western Russia and North Africa and was composed of rectangles measuring 15 minutes of latitude by 30 minutes of longitude, an area of about 360 square miles (930 km^{2}). These sectors were then subdivided into 36 smaller units to give a location area 3 km × 4 km (1.9 mi × 2.5 mi) in size.

Chronicle of aerial victories
This and the ♠ (Ace of spades) indicates those aerial victories which made Schmidt an "ace-in-a-day", a term which designates a fighter pilot who has shot down five or more airplanes in a single day. This and the ? (question mark) indicates information discrepancies listed by Barbas, Prien, Stemmer, Rodeike, Bock, Mathews and Foreman.
| Claim | Date | Time | Type | Location | Unit | Claim | Date | Time | Type | Location | Unit |
– Claims with Jagdgeschwader 52 on the Eastern Front – Operation Barbarossa — June – December 1941
| ? (Note: This claim is not listed by Prien, Stemmer, Rodeike and Bock.) | 26 June 1941 | 09:34 | DB-3 | south of Varėna | 4./JG 52 | 8 | 29 August 1941 | 15:11 | I-15? (Note: According to Mathews and Foreman claimed as a Polikarpov I-153.) | | 4./JG 52 |
| 1 | 26 June 1941 | 14:27 | DB-3 | | 4./JG 52 | 9 | 7 September 1941 | 14:35 | I-18 (MiG-1) | | 4./JG 52 |
| 2 | 3 July 1941 | 19:03 | R-Z? (Note: According to Mathews and Foreman claimed as a Polikarpov R-5.) | | 4./JG 52 | 10 | 8 September 1941 | 17:25 | DB-3 | | 4./JG 52 |
| 3 | 4 July 1941 | 12:02 | DB-3 | | 4./JG 52 | 11 | 8 September 1941 | 17:32 | DB-3 | Sologubowka | 4./JG 52 |
| 4 | 5 July 1941 | 06:35 | DB-3 | | 4./JG 52 | 12 | 11 September 1941 | 07:50 | I-18 (MiG-1) | southeast of Lyby | 4./JG 52 |
| 5 | 25 August 1941 | 08:50 | I-17 (MiG-1) | | 4./JG 52 | 13 | 12 September 1941 | 09:56 | I-18 (MiG-1) | | 4./JG 52 |
| 6 | 26 August 1941 | 08:56 | I-17 (MiG-1) | | 4./JG 52 | 14 | 26 November 1941 | 13:55 | DB-3 | | 4./JG 52 |
| 7 | 29 August 1941 | 15:10 | I-15? | | 4./JG 52 | 15 | 27 November 1941 | 13:04 | I-301 (LaGG-3) | 12 km (7.5 mi) south of Klin | 4./JG 52 |
– Claims with Jagdgeschwader 52 on the Eastern Front – 7 May 1942 – 3 February 1943
| 16 | 9 May 1942 | 08:45 | I-153 | | 4./JG 52 | 71 | 22 August 1942 | 09:22 | Pe-2 (Note: From 86th Bomber Aviation Regiment) | PQ 40733 | 5./JG 52 |
| 17 | 9 May 1942 | 15:28 | MiG-1 | | 4./JG 52 | 72 | 23 August 1942 | 08:44 | Il-2 | PQ 49141 | 5./JG 52 |
| 18 | 11 May 1942 | 12:39 | Pe-2 | | 4./JG 52 | 73 | 23 August 1942 | 10:50 | LaGG-3 | PQ 49194 | 5./JG 52 |
| 19 | 18 May 1942 | 12:35 | R-5 | | 4./JG 52 | 74 | 23 August 1942 | 12:32 | LaGG-3 | PQ 49163 | 5./JG 52 |
| 20 | 25 May 1942 | 09:24 | Il-2 | | 4./JG 52 | 75 | 23 August 1942 | 12:51 | I-180 | PQ 49104 | 5./JG 52 |
| 21 | 25 May 1942 | 09:25 | Il-2 | | 4./JG 52 | 76♠ | 24 August 1942 | 06:09 | LaGG-3 | PQ 49232 | 5./JG 52 |
| 22 | 25 May 1942 | 18:55 | MiG-1 | | 4./JG 52 | 77♠ | 24 August 1942 | 06:12 | LaGG-3 | PQ 49262 | 5./JG 52 |
| 23 | 26 May 1942 | 11:37 | Il-2 | | 4./JG 52 | 78♠ | 24 August 1942 | 06:14 | LaGG-3 | PQ 59172 | 5./JG 52 |
| 24 | 27 May 1942 | 15:27 | Pe-2 | east of Petrovskaya | 4./JG 52 | 79♠ | 24 August 1942 | 06:15 | LaGG-3 | PQ 59181 | 5./JG 52 |
| 25 | 27 May 1942 | 15:48 | Pe-2 | southeast of Petrovskaya | 4./JG 52 | 80♠ | 24 August 1942 | 08:42 | LaGG-3 | PQ 59442 | 5./JG 52 |
| 26 | 28 May 1942 | 18:38 | Il-2 | | 4./JG 52 | 81♠ | 24 August 1942 | 08:52 | LaGG-3 | PQ 59282 | 5./JG 52 |
| 27 | 1 June 1942 | 18:35 | Il-2 | | 4./JG 52 | 82♠ | 24 August 1942 | 12:01 | LaGG-3 | PQ 49243 | 5./JG 52 |
| 28 | 19 June 1942 | 05:36 | I-16 | | 4./JG 52 | 83 | 25 August 1942 | 07:27 | LaGG-3 | PQ 49274 | 5./JG 52 |
| 29 | 22 June 1942 | 06:25 | LaGG-3 | | 4./JG 52 | 84 | 25 August 1942 | 07:35 | LaGG-3 | PQ 49272 | 5./JG 52 |
| 30 | 22 June 1942 | 06:37 | LaGG-3 | | 4./JG 52 | 85 | 25 August 1942 | 16:10 | LaGG-3 | PQ 59174 | 5./JG 52 |
| 31 | 22 June 1942 | 11:49 | LaGG-3 | | 4./JG 52 | 86 | 27 August 1942 | 11:13 | I-180 | PQ 49284 | 5./JG 52 |
| 32 | 22 June 1942 | 11:53 | LaGG-3 | | 4./JG 52 | 87 | 27 August 1942 | 11:33 | I-180 | PQ 49452 | 5./JG 52 |
| 33 | 23 June 1942 | 12:52 | Yak-1 | | 4./JG 52 | 88 | 28 August 1942 | 07:12 | I-180 | PQ 49254 | 5./JG 52 |
| 34 | 24 June 1942 | 07:47 | LaGG-3 | | 4./JG 52 | 89 | 28 August 1942 | 07:21 | I-180 | PQ 49292 | 5./JG 52 |
| 35 | 24 June 1942 | 07:49 | LaGG-3 | | 4./JG 52 | 90 | 30 August 1942 | 09:14 | Il-2 | PQ 49134 | 5./JG 52 |
| 36 | 26 June 1942 | 10:28 | LaGG-3 | | 4./JG 52 | 91 | 30 August 1942 | 09:17 | Il-2 | PQ 40841 | 5./JG 52 |
| 37 | 26 June 1942 | 10:31 | LaGG-3 | | 4./JG 52 | 92 | 31 August 1942 | 05:06 | LaGG-3 | PQ 49384 | 5./JG 52 |
| 38 | 26 June 1942 | 13:10 | LaGG-3 | | 4./JG 52 | 93 | 31 August 1942 | 09:01 | LaGG-3 | PQ 49522 | 5./JG 52 |
| 39 | 28 June 1942 | 16:05 | Hurricane | | 4./JG 52 | 94 | 7 September 1942 | 09:24 | LaGG-3 | PQ 44454 | 5./JG 52 |
| 40 | 30 June 1942 | 15:10 | LaGG-3 | | 5./JG 52 | 95 | 7 September 1942 | 09:28 | LaGG-3 | PQ 54531 | 5./JG 52 |
| 41 | 2 July 1942 | 06:07 | LaGG-3 | | 5./JG 52 | 96 | 8 September 1942 | 12:37 | LaGG-3 | PQ 49654 | 5./JG 52 |
| 42 | 2 July 1942 | 06:10 | LaGG-3 | | 5./JG 52 | 97 | 8 September 1942 | 14:41 | LaGG-3 | PQ 44257 | 5./JG 52 |
| 43 | 4 July 1942 | 06:30 | LaGG-3 | | 5./JG 52 | 98 | 8 September 1942 | 14:49 | LaGG-3 | PQ 44623 | 5./JG 52 |
| 44 | 4 July 1942 | 08:30 | LaGG-3 | | 5./JG 52 | 99 | 9 September 1942 | 05:24 | Il-2 | PQ 44423 | 5./JG 52 |
| 45 | 4 July 1942 | 14:28 | Hurricane | | 5./JG 52 | 100 | 9 September 1942 | 05:29 | Il-2 | PQ 44442 | 5./JG 52 |
| 46 | 9 July 1942 | 12:14 | Pe-2 | | 5./JG 52 | 101 | 12 September 1942 | 16:45 | LaGG-3 | PQ 49412 | 5./JG 52 |
| 47 | 9 July 1942 | 15:47 | LaGG-3 | | 5./JG 52 | 102 | 14 September 1942 | 16:46 | Su-2 | PQ 44611 | 5./JG 52 |
| 48 | 10 July 1942 | 10:28 | LaGG-3 | | 5./JG 52 | 103♠ | 17 September 1942 | 09:19 | LaGG-3 | PQ 54391 | 5./JG 52 |
| 49 | 16 July 1942 | 17:52 | I-16 | | 5./JG 52 | 104♠ | 17 September 1942 | 09:25 | LaGG-3 | PQ 54471 | 5./JG 52 |
| 50 | 19 July 1942 | 06:06 | LaGG-3 | | 5./JG 52 | 105♠ | 17 September 1942 | 13:44 | LaGG-3 | PQ 54543 | 5./JG 52 |
| 51 | 20 July 1942 | 10:16 | LaGG-3 | | 5./JG 52 | 106♠ | 17 September 1942 | 16:39 | LaGG-3 | PQ 54362 | 5./JG 52 |
| 52 | 22 July 1942 | 06:31 | LaGG-3 | | 5./JG 52 | 107♠ | 17 September 1942 | 16:41 | LaGG-3 | PQ 54474 | 5./JG 52 |
| 53 | 22 July 1942 | 06:39 | R-5 | | 5./JG 52 | 108 | 19 September 1942 | 11:04 | LaGG-3 | PQ 54371 | 5./JG 52 |
| 54 | 23 July 1942 | 12:52 | Il-2 | | 5./JG 52 | 109 | 1 December 1942 | 08:45 | LaGG-3 | PQ 49361 | 6./JG 52 |
| 55 | 23 July 1942 | 12:59 | Il-2 | | 5./JG 52 | 110 | 1 December 1942 | 10:47 | Il-2 | PQ 49152 | 6./JG 52 |
| 56 | 23 July 1942 | 16:01 | Il-2 | PQ 18532 | 5./JG 52 | 111 | 2 December 1942 | 13:42 | Il-2 | PQ 49393 | 6./JG 52 |
| 57 | 23 July 1942 | 18:19 | Il-2 | | 5./JG 52 | 112 | 8 December 1942 | 11:45 | Il-2 | PQ 49171 | 6./JG 52 |
| 58 | 24 July 1942 | 08:06 | Pe-2 | | 5./JG 52 | 113 | 8 December 1942 | 11:47 | Il-2 | PQ 39392 | 6./JG 52 |
| 59 | 24 July 1942 | 16:20 | Il-2 | | 5./JG 52 | 114 | 8 December 1942 | 12:03 | LaGG-3 | PQ 49331 | 6./JG 52 |
| 60 | 24 July 1942 | 16:21 | Il-2 | | 5./JG 52 | 115 | 10 December 1942 | 08:13 | Il-2 | PQ 49151 | 6./JG 52 |
| 61 | 25 July 1942 | 08:47 | I-153 | | 5./JG 52 | 116 | 10 December 1942 | 08:37 | Yak-4 | PQ 49123 | 6./JG 52 |
| 62 | 25 July 1942 | 08:49 | I-153 | | 5./JG 52 | 117 | 10 December 1942 | 09:56 | Il-2 | PQ 39262 | 6./JG 52 |
| 63 | 25 July 1942 | 08:56 | I-153 | | 5./JG 52 | 118 | 17 December 1942 | 11:16 | La-5 | PQ 3824 | 6./JG 52 |
| 64 | 28 July 1942 | 09:26 | Il-2 | | 5./JG 52 | 119 | 17 December 1942 | 13:01 | Yak-1 | PQ 39872 | 6./JG 52 |
| 65 | 21 August 1942 | 07:36 | I-180 | PQ 49243 | 5./JG 52 | 120 | 17 December 1942 | 13:16 | Yak-1 | PQ 49744 | 6./JG 52 |
| 66 | 21 August 1942 | 17:33 | Il-2 | PQ 39234 | 5./JG 52 | 121 | 18 December 1942 | 06:34 | La-5 | PQ 49744 | 6./JG 52 |
| 67 | 21 August 1942 | 17:35 | Il-2 | PQ 49192 | 5./JG 52 | 122 | 19 December 1942 | 06:46 | Pe-2 | PQ 38612 | 6./JG 52 |
| 68 | 21 August 1942 | 17:37 | LaGG-3 | PQ 49411 | 5./JG 52 | 123 | 19 December 1942 | 11:24 | La-5 | PQ 4958 | 6./JG 52 |
| 69 | 22 August 1942 | 09:17 | Pe-2 | PQ 40743 | 5./JG 52 | 124 | 20 December 1942 | 06:44 | Yak-1 | PQ 39794 | 6./JG 52 |
| 70 | 22 August 1942 | 09:20 | Pe-2 | PQ 40723 | 5./JG 52 | 125 | 7 January 1943 | 13:17 | LaGG-3 | PQ 28812 | 5./JG 52 |
– Claims with Jagdgeschwader 52 on the Eastern Front – 4 February – 5 September 1943
| 126 | 10 February 1943 | 13:12 | Boston | PQ 34 Ost 96113 | 5./JG 52 | 150 | 12 August 1943 | 16:07 | Yak-1 | PQ 35 Ost 51341 | 6./JG 52 |
| 127 | 11 February 1943 | 09:31 | Yak-1 | PQ 34 Ost 86733 | 5./JG 52 | 151 | 13 August 1943 | 17:46 | La-5 | PQ 35 Ost 51341 | 6./JG 52 |
| 128 | 11 February 1943 | 14:58 | Yak-1 | PQ 34 Ost 86561 | 5./JG 52 | 152 | 15 August 1943 | 07:26 | La-5 | PQ 35 Ost 51172 | 6./JG 52 |
| 129 | 12 February 1943 | 09:44 | Yak-1 | PQ 34 Ost 86671 | 5./JG 52 | 153 | 15 August 1943 | 10:46 | La-5 | PQ 35 Ost 51341 | 6./JG 52 |
| 130 | 12 February 1943 | 14:58 | Il-2 | PQ 34 Ost 86691 | 5./JG 52 | 154 | 17 August 1943 | 07:29 | LaGG-3 | PQ 35 Ost 41452 | 6./JG 52 |
| 131 | 28 July 1943 | 10:20 | Airacobra | PQ 34 Ost 76884 | 6./JG 52 | 155 | 17 August 1943 | 08:31 | Pe-2 | PQ 35 Ost 51171 | 6./JG 52 |
| 132♠ | 4 August 1943 | 11:02 | Il-2 m.H. (Note: The "m.H." refers to an Ilyushin Il-2 with rear gunner (mit Heckschütze).) | PQ 35 Ost 61374 | 6./JG 52 | 156 | 17 August 1943 | 08:35 | Pe-2 | PQ 35 Ost 41292 | 6./JG 52 |
| 133♠ | 4 August 1943 | 11:09 | Yak-1 | PQ 35 Ost 61383, southeast of Orlowka | 6./JG 52 | 157 | 20 August 1943 | 10:55 | Yak-1 | PQ 35 Ost 51541 | 6./JG 52 |
| 134♠ | 4 August 1943 | 13:35 | Yak-1 | PQ 35 Ost 61383 | 6./JG 52 | 158 | 20 August 1943 | 14:49 | Yak-1 | PQ 35 Ost 51771 | 6./JG 52 |
| 135♠ | 4 August 1943 | 13:39 | La-5 | PQ 35 Ost 61391 | 6./JG 52 | 159 | 21 August 1943 | 06:24 | La-5 | PQ 35 Ost 51543, northeast of Achtyrskaja | 6./JG 52 |
| 136♠ | 4 August 1943 | 17:26 | Yak-1 | PQ Ost 61481 | 6./JG 52 | 160 | 23 August 1943 | 15:58 | Yak-1 | PQ 34 Ost 88281 | 6./JG 52 |
| 137 | 5 August 1943 | 08:14 | Yak-1 | PQ 35 Ost 61471 | 6./JG 52 | 161 | 24 August 1943 | 06:09 | LaGG-3 | PQ 34 Ost 88424 | 6./JG 52 |
| 138 | 5 August 1943 | 08:22 | Il-2 m.H. | PQ 35 Ost 61483 | 6./JG 52 | 162 | 24 August 1943 | 14:58 | Il-2 m.H. | PQ 34 Ost 88332 | 6./JG 52 |
| 139 | 5 August 1943 | 14:26 | Yak-1 | PQ 35 Ost 61441 | 6./JG 52 | 163 | 24 August 1943 | 17:57 | La-5 | PQ 34 Ost 88413 | 6./JG 52 |
| 140 | 6 August 1943 | 08:40 | Yak-1 | PQ 35 Ost 61643 | 6./JG 52 | 164 | 28 August 1943 | 11:21 | Il-2 m.H. | PQ 35 Ost 40222 | 6./JG 52 |
| 141 | 6 August 1943 | 08:43 | Il-2 m.H. | PQ 35 Ost 61643 | 6./JG 52 | 165 | 29 August 1943 | 06:49 | Yak-1 | PQ 35 Ost 51894 | 6./JG 52 |
| 142 | 6 August 1943 | 10:53 | Il-2 m.H. | PQ 35 Ost 61471 | 6./JG 52 | 166 | 29 August 1943 | 16:04 | Il-2 m.H. | PQ 35 Ost 60273 | 6./JG 52 |
| 143 | 6 August 1943 | 11:07 | La-5 | PQ 35 Ost 61581 | 6./JG 52 | 167 | 29 August 1943 | 16:10 | Yak-1 | PQ 35 Ost 60321 | 6./JG 52 |
| 144 | 7 August 1943 | 18:28 | La-5 | PQ 35 Ost 60834 | 6./JG 52 | 168 | 30 August 1943 | 16:51 | Il-2 m.H. | PQ 34 Ost 88734 | 6./JG 52 |
| 145 | 8 August 1943 | 10:15 | Yak-1 | PQ 35 Ost 60481 | 6./JG 52 | 169 | 30 August 1943 | 16:54 | Yak-1 | PQ 34 Ost 88732 | 6./JG 52 |
| 146 | 10 August 1943 | 08:54 | Pe-2 | PQ 35 Ost 51851 | 6./JG 52 | 170 | 1 September 1943 | 16:51 | La-5 | PQ 35 Ost 60342 | 6./JG 52 |
| 147 | 10 August 1943 | 13:29 | La-5 | PQ 35 Ost 60252 | 6./JG 52 | 171 | 3 September 1943 | 10:45 | La-5 | PQ 35 Ost 50113 | 6./JG 52 |
| 148 | 11 August 1943 | 11:46 | La-5 | PQ 35 Ost 41262 | 6./JG 52 | 172 | 5 September 1943 | 08:55 | La-5 | PQ 35 Ost 71741 | 6./JG 52 |
| 149 | 12 August 1943 | 15:51 | Yak-1 | PQ 35 Ost 51511 | 6./JG 52 | 173 | 5 September 1943 | 09:00 | Il-2 m.H. | PQ 35 41592 | 6./JG 52 |

=== Awards ===
- Flugzeugführerabzeichen (Pilots Badge)
- Iron Cross (1939)
  - 2nd Class (22 October 1940)
  - 1st Class (9 November 1940)
- Front Flying Clasp of the Luftwaffe
  - in Gold (22 August 1941)
  - in Gold with pennant (12 December 1942)
- Honour Goblet of the Luftwaffe on 6 July 1942 as Leutnant and pilot
- German Cross in Gold on 13 August 1942 as Leutnant in the 4./Jagdgeschwader 52 (Note: According to Stockert, the Präsidialkanzlei (Presidential Chancellery) awarded the German Cross in Gold on 17 November 1942 while his pay book states that it was awarded on 20 August 1942.)
- Medaille "Winterschlacht Im Osten 1941/42" (30 August 1942)
- Knight's Cross of the Iron Cross with Oak Leaves
  - Knight's Cross on 23 August 1942 as Leutnant and pilot in the 6./Jagdgeschwader 52
  - 124th Oak Leaves on 16 September 1942 as Leutnant and pilot in the 6./Jagdgeschwader 52 (Note: According to Scherzer on 15 September 1942.)

=== Dates of rank ===
| 1 December 1939: | Gefreiter |
| 1 October 1940: | Obergefreiter |
| 1 December 1940: | Unteroffizier |
| 1 April 1941: | Feldwebel |
| 27 August 1941: | Oberfeldwebel |
| 1 February 1942: | Leutnant (war officer) |
| 1 August 1942: | Oberleutnant |

== Notes ==
Military offices
| Preceded by Oblt Karl Ritzenberger | Squadron Leader of 6./JG 52; 27 July 1943 – 5 September 1943 | Succeeded by Ltn Helmut Lipfert |
