= 8th Air Corps =

8th Air Corps VIII. Fliegerkorps
- Flag of a commanding general of a Fliegerkorps
- Active: 19 July 1939 – 26 January 1945
- Country: Nazi Germany
- Branch: Luftwaffe
- Size: Corps

Commanders
- Notable commanders: Wolfram Freiherr von Richthofen

8th Air Corps (VIII. Fliegerkorps) was formed 19 July 1939 in Oppeln as Fliegerführer z.b.V. ("for special purposes"). It was renamed to the 8th Air Corps on 10 November 1939. The Corps was also known as Luftwaffenkommando Schlesien between 25 January 1945 and 2 February 1945 and was merged with Luftgau-Kommando VIII on 28 April 1945 and redesignated Luftwaffenkommando VIII.

== Commanding General and officers ==
Rank	Surname	Date
Generalmajor	Wolfram von Richthofen	10 November 1939 - 30 June 1942
Generalmajor	Martin Fiebig	1 July 1942 - 21 May 1943
Generalmajor	Hans Seidemann	21 May 1943 - 28 April 1945

=== Chief of Staff ===
Rank	Surname	Date
Oberstleutnant	Hans Seidemann	27 December 1939 - 10 October 1940
Oberst	Rudolf Meister	15 October 1940 - 14 March 1942
Oberstleutnant	Klaus Uebe	15 March 1942 - 24 October 1942
Oberstleutnant	Lothar von Heinemann	26 October 1942 to 11 June 1943
Oberst	Erich Schult	12 June 1943 - 1 October 1943
Oberst	Thorsten Christ	1 October 1943 - 18 November 1944
Oberst	Helmut Sorge	24 March 1945 - 28 April 1945

=== First General Staff Officer ===
Rank	Surname	Date
Hauptmann	Lothar von Heinemann	1 March 1940 - 19 February 1942
Hauptmann	Helmut Sorge	20 February 1942 - 15 March 1942
Oberstleutnant	Torsten Christ	15 March 1942 - 30 March 1942
Major	Claus Hinkelbein	26 May 1942 - 4 November 1942
Hauptmann	Hans Meffert	10 April 1943 - 24 January 1944
Major	Ernst-Günther Moeller	15 December 1943 - 28 April 1945

== Subordinate to ==
Unit	from	to
Luftflotte 2	10 November 1939	13 May 1940
Luftflotte 3	13 May 1940	August 1940
Luftflotte 2	August 1940	January 1941
Luftflotte 4	January 1941	June 1941
Luftflotte 2	June 1941	July 1941
Luftflotte 1	July 1941	28 September 1941
Luftflotte 2	28 September 1941	December 1941
Oberkommando der Luftwaffe	December 1941	May 1942
Luftflotte 4	May 1942	July 1944
Luftflotte 6	July 1944	April 1945

== Subordinate organisations ==
10 May 1940 (Note: For the meanings of abbreviations, see Luftwaffe#Organisation_and_chain_of_command)	Stab, I., II. und III. Kampfgeschwader 77; Stab, I. und III. Sturzkampfgeschwader 2; I. Sturzkampfgeschwader 76; Stab, I. und III. Sturzkampfgeschwader 77; IV. Lehrgeschwader 1; II. Lehrgeschwader 2; I. Jagdgeschwader 27; I. Jagdgeschwader 1, I. Jagdgeschwader 21; 2. Fernaufklärungsgruppe 123
13 August 1940	I. und III. Sturzkampfgeschwader 1; I. und II. Sturzkampfgeschwader 2; I., II. und III. Sturzkampfgeschwader 77; II. Lehrgeschwader 2; V. Lehrgeschwader 1; 2. Fernaufklärungsgruppe 11, 2. Fernaufklärungsgruppe 123; Nahaufklärungsgruppe 21
5 April 1941	Stab, I. und III. Sturzkampfgeschwader 2; III. Sturzkampfgeschwader 3; I. Sturzkampfgeschwader 1; II. und 10. Lehrgeschwader 2; II. Zerstörergeschwader 26; Stab, II. und III. Jagdgeschwader 27; I. Lehrgeschwader 2; 2. Fernaufklärungsgruppe 11
20 May 1941	Stab, I. und III. Kampfgeschwader 2; III. Kampfgeschwader 3; I., II. und III. Lehrgeschwader 1; II. Kampfgeschwader 26; II. Kampfgeschwader 4; Stab, I., II. und III. Sturzkampfgeschwader 1; Stab, I. und III. Sturzkampfgeschwader 2; Stab, I., II. und III. Sturzkampfgeschwader 77; Stab, I. und II. Zerstörergeschwader 26; II. Zerstörergeschwader 76; Stab, II. und III. Jagdgeschwader 77; I. und II. und 10. Lehrgeschwader 2; 2. Fernaufklärungsgruppe 11; 7. Lehrgeschwader 2
22 June 1941	Stab, I., II. und III. Kampfgeschwader 2; Stab, II. und III. Sturzkampfgeschwader 1; Stab, I. und III. Sturzkampfgeschwader 2, II. und 10. Lehrgeschwader 2; Stab, I. und II. Zerstörergeschwader 26; Stab, II. und III. Jagdgeschwader 27, II. Jagdgeschwader 52; 2. Fernaufklärungsgruppe 11; KGr. z. b. V. 1; ErgGr. 26
5 June 1943	Stab und II. Kampfgeschwader 3; Stab, I. und II. Kampfgeschwader 27; Stab, II. und III. Kampfgeschwader 55; I. Kampfgeschwader 100; Stab, I. und II. Schlachtgeschwader 1; Stab, I., II. und III. Sturzkampfgeschwader 2; Stab, Stab, I., II. und III. Sturzkampfgeschwader 77; Stab, I. und III. Jagdgeschwader 52; Stab, II. und III. Jagdgeschwader 3; 10. Nachtjagdgeschwader 5; various independent squadrons
June 1944	14. Kampfgeschwader 27; Stab, 12. und 13. Schlachtgeschwader 9, Stab, I., II., III. und 10.(Pz.) Schlachtgeschwader 77; Stab und 1. Nachtschlachtgruppe 4; 2. Fernaufklärungsgruppe 11, 2. Fernaufklärungsgruppe 100; Stab, 1. und 2. Nachtaufklärungsgruppe 2; ung. Staffel 102; ung. Fliegerführer 106
March 8 1945	3. Flieger-Division; Stab, II. und III. Schlachtgeschwader 4; Stab, I., II., III. und 10. Schlachtgeschwader 77; Stab, II., III. und 10. Schlachtgeschwader 2; 3. Nachtschlachtgruppe 4; Stab, I., II. und III. Jagdgeschwader 6; IV. Jagdgeschwader 1; Stab Nahaufklärungsgruppe 15, 1. und 2. Nahaufklärungsgruppe 15, 12. Nahaufklärungsgruppe 13; Fi 156-Kommando IV; Fi 156-Kommando V; Stab Fernaufklärungsgruppe 3, 2. Fernaufklärungsgruppe 100, 4. Fernaufklärungsgruppe 121, 4. Nachtfernaufklärungsgruppe

== See also ==
- Luftwaffe Organization

== Sources ==
- Caldwell, Donald L.; Muller, Richard R. (2007). The Luftwaffe over Germany: Defense of the Reich. London, UK: Greenhill Books. ISBN 978-1-85367-712-0.
