= Erich Woitke =

- Born: 29 January 1912; Mülheim
- Died: 24 December 1944 (aged 32) † near Aachen
- Military career
- Allegiance: Nazi Germany
- Branch: Luftwaffe
- Service years: ?-1944
- Rank: Oberleutnant
- Conflicts: Spanish Civil War; World War II: Battle of France; Battle of Britain; Eastern Front; Tunisian Campaign; Defense of the Reich; Western Front
- Awards: German Cross

Erich Woitke (29 January 1912 – 24 December 1944) was a fighter pilot 'ace' serving in the German Luftwaffe during World War II.

== Early life ==
Woitke was born 29 January 1912 in Mülheim, near Duisburg.

== Military career ==
Leutnant Woitke served with the fighter unit 1./J 88 of the Condor Legion during the Spanish Civil War. He recorded his first victory on 27 September 1937, claiming a Republican I-16 "Rata". He claimed 3 more victories, all "Ratas" before returning to Germany. From the early stages of his career until his death, Woitke was considered outspoken, and anti-authoritarian, and his attitude to authority would lead him into conflict with his superiors on numerous occasions. He is reputed to have received the German Cross in Gold from Hermann Göring in person, only to hurl the award on the floor while making disparaging remarks.

=== World War II ===
In February 1940, Oberleutnant Woitke was made Staffelkapitän, 6./JG 3, leading the unit through the Battle of France. On 31 May 1940, he shot down a Royal Air Force (RAF) Bristol Blenheim and then claimed a French Morane-Saulnier M.S.406 near Compigne on 3 June.

Operating during the Battle of Britain, Woitke claimed 7 victories. On 1 October 1940, Woitke was appointed Gruppenkommandeur of II./JG 3. He was then appointed Gruppenkommandeur II./JG 52 in late November. He recorded his next victory (his 14th in total) on 14 February 1941, a Spitfire over Maidstone.

Woitke led II./JG 52 east in May 1941 for the invasion of Russia. He claimed two victories on 22 June 1941, the opening day of Operation Barbarossa. The severity of the Russian winter of 1941–42 was such that Luftwaffe operations were virtually halted. By January the pilots and ground personnel of II./JG 52 were pressed into service as infantry to protect their airfields from the sudden Soviet counter offensive in the Rzhev sector. As commander, Woitke was warned of a Soviet incursion on the night of 20 January and was advised by local army commanders to alert the airfield's defensive positions. He apparently ignored the advice and consequently several pilots and ground crew were killed and wounded, including the gruppe adjutant, Oberleutnant Carl Hartmann. Woitke was therefore court-martialled, removed from command and demoted.

In October 1942, Woitke was back in front line service, with II./JG 27 in Africa. He claimed a USAAF P-39 Airacobra on 9 October over El Daba as victory number 23. By January 1943, he was serving with Stab.JG 77 in Tunisia, claiming a Curtiss P-40 on 14 January.

By October 1943, Woitke was part of 2./JG 11 on Reichsverteidigung (Defense of the Reich) duties. He claimed his 25th kill, a B-17, on 9 October. He was then transferred to II./JG 300 in early 1944, and shot down a B-24 bomber on 21 February.

In May 1944, Woitke was appointed as Gruppenkommandeur III./JG 1. After the D-Day landings, III./JG 1 was sent to Beauvais as part of the counter to the Allied aerial operations over the beaches in Normandy. On 18 June, Woitke was shot down in aerial combat with a P-38 near Pont Laverne, and although he bailed out of his Bf 109 G-6, he dislocated both shoulders. His injuries hospitalised him until October 1944.

On his recovery, Woitke returned to III./JG 1 which now based at Anklam. On 24 December 1944, Woitke was shot down and killed in aerial combat near Aachen in a dogfight with Spitfires. He was credited with 30 victories, eight on the Russian front, two in Africa, and the rest on the Western Front, including three heavy bombers. His victory total includes four victories claimed in the Spanish Civil War.

== Awards ==
- Iron Cross (1939) 1st and 2nd Class
- Ehrenpokal der Luftwaffe
- Eastern Front Medal
- German Cross in Gold
- West Wall Medal
- Commemorative Medal for the Italo-German Campaign in Africa
- Legion Condor Medal
