= Allied Air Forces Central Europe =

Former NATO command

- Coat of arms
- Active: 1951–1993
- Allegiance: (NATO) North Atlantic Treaty Organization
- Part of: Allied Command Operations, Casteau, Belgium
- Location: Ramstein, Germany

Allied Air Forces Central Europe (AAFCE) was the NATO command tasked with air and air defense operations in NATOs Allied Forces Central Europe (AFCENT) area of command.

== History ==
Allied Air Forces Central Europe was activated on 2 April 1951 at Fontainebleau in France through General Dwight D. Eisenhower's General Order No. 1. The first commanding officer of AAFCE was U.S. Air Force general Lauris Norstad, commanding general of US Air Forces in Europe, Wiesbaden. AAFCE reported to Allied Forces Central Europe (AFCENT) at Fontainebleau, which in turn reported to Allied Command Europe, headquartered at Supreme Headquarters Allied Powers Europe (SHAPE) in Rocquencourt. The task of AAFCE was to control and command allied air assets in the NATO Central Region [of Europe] in wartime.

Flight magazine, in the first of a three-part feature on 26 June 1953, described AAFCE as already comprising two allied tactical air forces, Second Allied Tactical Air Force, under RAF Air Marshal Sir Robert Foster, comprising British-Dutch No. 2 Group RAF, Belgian-Dutch 69 Group (which later issues described as being responsible for 'Low Countries Air Defence' and being alternately under Dutch and Belgian officers), and British-Belgian No. 83 Group RAF. Fourth Allied Tactical Air Force, under General Dean C. Strother (USAF), comprised the Twelfth Air Force, French 1er Air Division, and the Canadian No. 1 Air Division RCAF.

== Commanders 1951–1967 ==
List of AAFCE commanders
#	Name	Country	Service	Duration
1	General Lauris Norstad	United States	US Air Force	2 April 1951 – 16 July 1953
2	Air Chief Marshal Sir Basil Embry	United Kingdom	Royal Air Force	16 July 1953 – 1 January 1956
3	Air Chief Marshal Sir George Mills	United Kingdom	Royal Air Force	1 January 1956 – 20 May 1959
4	Air Chief Marshal Sir Harry Broadhurst	United Kingdom	Royal Air Force	20 May 1959 – 1 March 1961
5	Air Chief Marshal The Earl of Bandon	United Kingdom	Royal Air Force	1 March 1961 – 1 December 1963
6	Air Chief Marshal Sir Edmund Hudleston*	United Kingdom	Royal Air Force	1 December 1963 – 1 March 1967

- Air Chief Marshal Sir Edmund Hudleston was promoted to Deputy C-in-C Allied Forces Central Europe in 1965 and continued in both positions until 1 March 1967, after which NATO officially combined the two positions. With the move of allied headquarters from France after the French withdrawal from NATOs integrated military structures beginning in 1966 AAFCE was co-located with AFCENT at Brunssum in the Netherlands.

Deputy C-in-C AFCENT
#	Name	Country	Service	Duration
7	Air Chief Marshal Sir Augustus Walker	United Kingdom	Royal Air Force	1 March 1967 – 13 April 1970
8	Air Chief Marshal Sir Frederick Rosier	United Kingdom	Royal Air Force	13 April 1970 – 31 September 1973
9	Air Chief Marshal Sir Lewis Hodges	United Kingdom	Royal Air Force	31 September 1973 – 5 February 1976

== At Ramstein 1974– 1993 ==
Emblem of Headquarters Allied Air Forces Central Europe

On 28 June 1974 Headquarters Allied Air Forces Central Europe (AAFCE) was re-established as an independent headquarters at Ramstein Air Base, Germany as one of three principal subordinate command under Allied Forces Central Europe (AFCENT). Its task was to provide central direction and control for NATO air forces in the European Central Region. Two existing headquarters, Second Allied Tactical Air Force (2 ATAF), based at RAF Rheindahlen, which covered the northern part of the region, and Fourth Allied Tactical Air Force (4 ATAF), based at Heidelberg, which was responsible for the southern part, both came under AAFCE's command.

Second Allied Tactical Air Force (2 ATAF) had been formed in 1958 to direct NATO air units in the Netherlands, Belgium, and the northern part of Germany in support of Northern Army Group (NORTHAG). Commander of 2ATAF was the commanding general of RAF Germany. The peacetime headquarters of 2 ATAF was at RAF Rheindahlen, the command center in case of war for 2 ATAF and NORTHAG was in the Netherlands, at Joint Operations Center Maastricht (JOC Maastricht). In 1983 NATO began with the construction of Static War Headquarters Castlegate in Linnich, Germany as a replacement for JOC Maastricht. 2 ATAF commanded RAF Germany, the Belgian Air Force, the Royal Netherlands Air Force, two divisions of the German Air Force and one US Air Force Tactical Fighter Group, as well as extensive air defense and radar installations.

Fourth Allied Tactical Air Force (4 ATAF) had been formed in 1958 to direct NATO air units in the southern part of Germany in support of Central Army Group (CENTAG). Commander of 4ATAF was the commanding general of US Seventeenth Air Force. The peacetime headquarters of 4 ATAF was in Heidelberg, the command center in the case of war for 4 ATAF and CENTAG was a secret bunker facility known as Feudenheim Bunker in Mannheim-Feudenheim, Germany. In 1985 NATO began with the construction of a new command bunker for CENTAG and 4 ATAF in Ruppertsweiler, Germany. Fourth Allied Tactical Air Force commanded the Seventeenth Air Force, two divisions of the German Air Force and the 1 Canadian Air Group of the Royal Canadian Air Force, as well as extensive air defense and radar installations, including the United States Army's 32nd Army Air Defense Command.

=== Commanders ===
List of AAFCE commanders
#	Name	Country	Service	Duration
10	Air Chief Marshal Sir Peter Le Cheminant	United Kingdom	Royal Air Force	5 February 1976 – 1 June 1979
11	Air Chief Marshal Sir John Stacey	United Kingdom	Royal Air Force	1 June 1979 – 1 February 1981
12	Air Chief Marshal Sir Peter Terry	United Kingdom	Royal Air Force	1 February 1981 – 8 April 1981
13	Air Chief Marshal Sir John Gingell	United Kingdom	Royal Air Force	8 April 1981 – 14 March 1984
14	Air Chief Marshal Michael Beavis	United Kingdom	Royal Air Force	14 March 1984 – 19 September 1986
15	Air Chief Marshal Sir Joseph Gilbert	United Kingdom	Royal Air Force	19 September 1986 – 1 May 1989
16	Air Chief Marshal Sir Anthony Skingsley	United Kingdom	Royal Air Force	1 May 1989 – 27 August 1993

== Post Cold War ==
During the early 1990s, following the relaxation of the tensions between East and West, a major reorganization of the NATO command and control structure was undertaken. As part of this, and to take account of the decrease in the number of allied aircraft in Europe, a rationalization of the Central Region air force headquarters occurred in 1993 with the disbandment of 2ATAF and 4ATAF on 30 June 1993 and AAFCE absorbing the functions previously undertaken by the ATAFs. The new command was inaugurated on 1 June 1993 retaining the name of Allied Air Forces Central Europe, but with a change in acronym to AIRCENT. The command was redesignated Component Command-Air Headquarters Ramstein in 2004, Allied Air Command, Ramstein in 2010 and Allied Air Command in 2013.
