= Second Allied Tactical Air Force =

Former NATO military aviation formation

- Active: 1958–1993
- Disbanded: 30 June 1993
- Countries: Belgium; Netherlands; United Kingdom; United States; West Germany
- Part of: Allied Air Forces Central Europe
- Headquarters: RAF Rheindahlen, West Germany

Second Allied Tactical Air Force (2 ATAF) was a NATO military formation under Allied Air Forces Central Europe tasked with providing air support to NATO's Northern Army Group (NORTHAG). 2 ATAF commanded all flying units based within its sector and all reinforcements flying into its sector, as well as ground-based radar systems and stations, air defense units and the airfields in its sector.

== History ==
Second Allied Tactical Air Force was formed in 1958. Its area of responsibility covered the Netherlands, Belgium, and Germany north of the city of Kassel and south of the Elbe river. The commander of 2 ATAF was the commanding Air Chief Marshal of the British RAF Second Tactical Air Force, which was renamed RAF Germany on 1 January 1959.

A Communication Squadron for 2 ATAF was established in February 1952, and disestablished in January 1959 at RAF Wildenrath, by being redesignated RAF Germany Communication Squadron.

The peacetime headquarters of 2 ATAF was at RAF Rheindahlen (Mönchengladbach), the command center in the case of war for 2 ATAF. NORTHAG was in the Netherlands at Joint Operations Center Maastricht (JOC Maastricht). In 1983 NATO began with the construction of Static War Headquarters Castlegate in Linnich, Germany, as a replacement for JOC Maastricht. An Alternate War HQ was located at Kanne (Belgium) north of Fort Eben-Emael.

2 ATAF commanded RAF Germany, the Belgian Air Force, the Royal Netherlands Air Force, two divisions of the German Air Force (Luftwaffe) and one US Air Force Tactical Fighter Group, as well as extensive air defense and radar installations provided by Germany, Belgium and the Netherlands.

If needed, 2 ATAF would have been reinforced with units from the US Third (UK based), Eighth (reconnaissance and bombing), Ninth (immediate reinforcements) and Twelfth Air Force (follow on reinforcements), and with French Air Force and Royal Air Force units. At the start of hostilities, 2 ATAF would have had immediately around 700 combat planes at its disposal.

2 ATAF was disbanded on 30 June 1993, its duties were taken over by Allied Air Forces Central Europe.

== War time structure c. 1989 ==
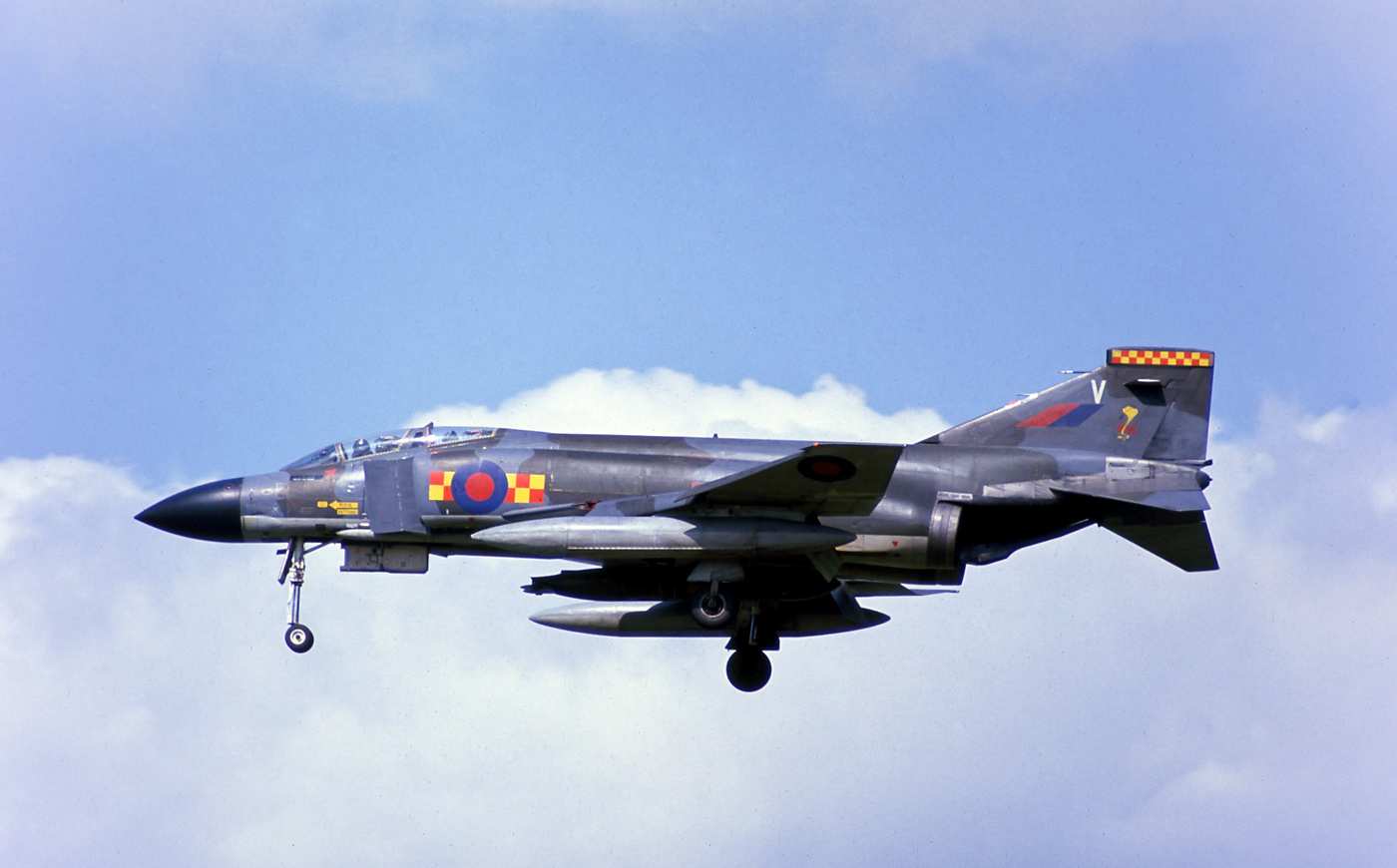
A Phantom FGR.2 of No. 92 Squadron landing at RAF Wildenrath in the mid-1980s

The following units would have come under 2 ATAF in wartime:

Royal Air Force Germany bases with flying units in 1989 (all located in North Rhine-Westphalia)

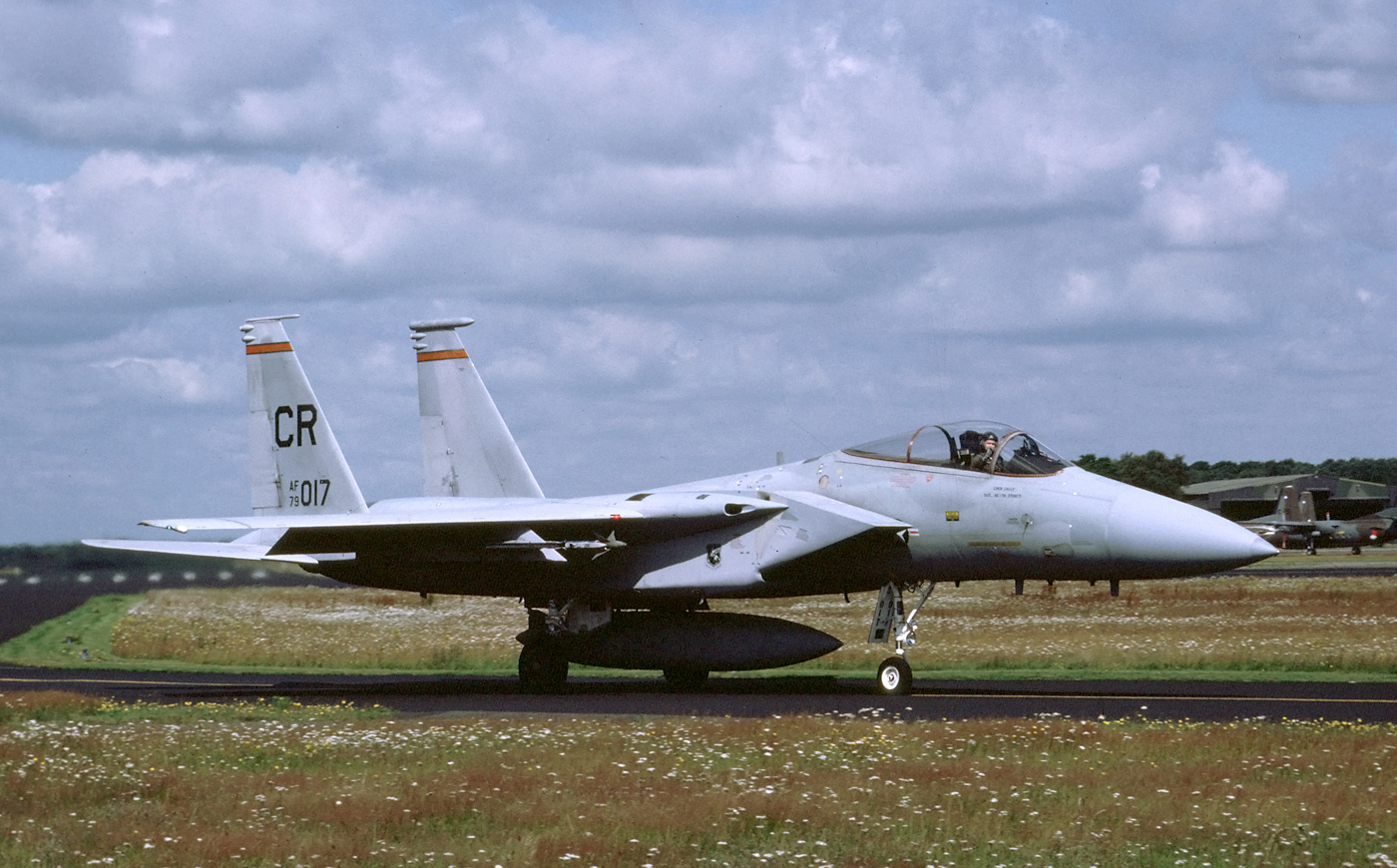
A F-15C Eagle of 32d Tactical Fighter Squadron taxiing at Soesterberg Air Base in the mid-1980s

Royal Belgium Air Force 2 ATAF assigned bases in 1989

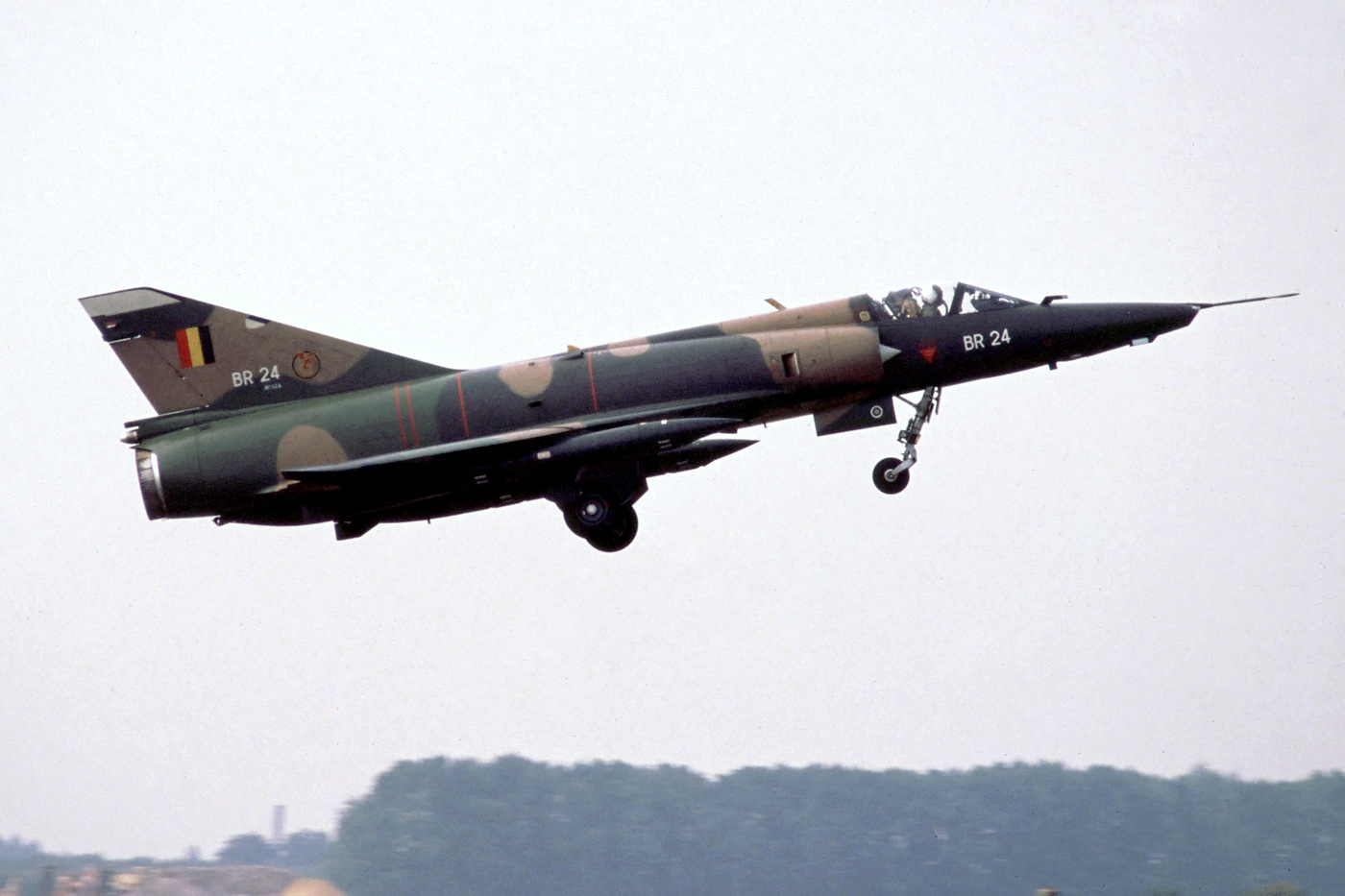
A Mirage 5BR of 42nd Squadron takes off in 1989

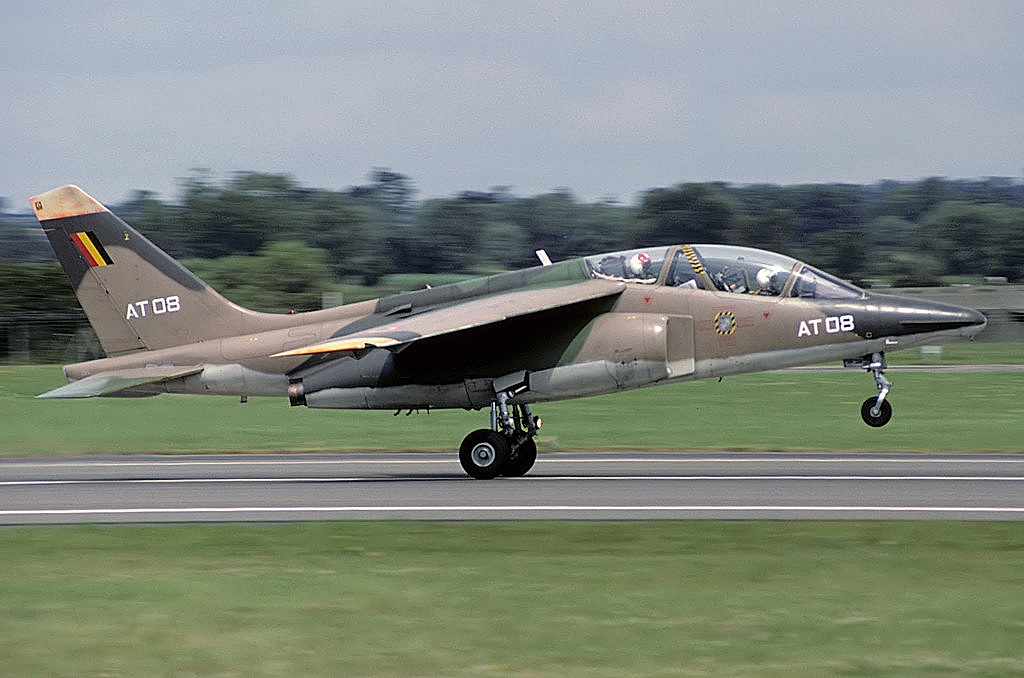
An Alpha Jet taking off in 1985

Royal Netherlands Air Force 2 ATAF assigned bases in 1989

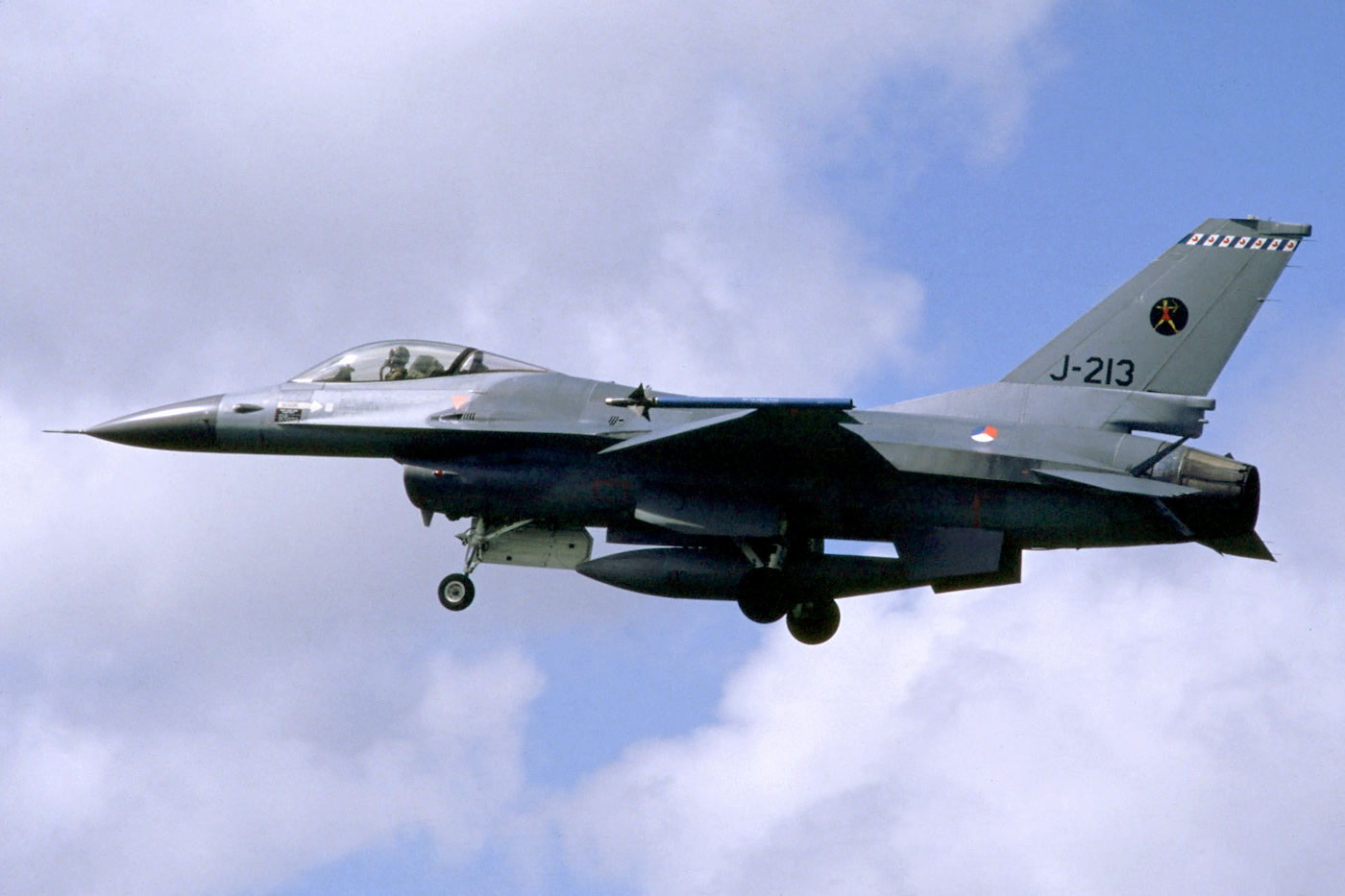
A F-16A Fighting Falcon of No. 323 Fighter/Bomber Squadron lands at Leeuwarden Air Base in 1983

- Headquarters Second Allied Tactical Air Force, RAF Rheindahlen/JOC Maastricht
  - Air Defence Operations Center (ADOC), Kanne
    - Sector Operations Center 1 (SOC 1), Aurich
      - 1st Btn, 34th (Luftwaffe) Signal Regiment, Control and Reporting Center Aurich
      - 2nd Btn, 34th (Luftwaffe) Signal Regiment, Control and Reporting Center Visselhövede
      - 3rd Btn, 34th (Luftwaffe) Signal Regiment, Control and Reporting Center Brekendorf
      - Royal Netherlands Air Force, Control and Reporting Center Nieuw Milligen, Netherlands
        - No. 225 Squadron, (3× I-Hawk launch stations & 3× Flycatcher/Bofors 40L70 AAA)
    - Sector Operations Center 2 (SOC 2), Uedem
      - 1st Btn, 33rd (Luftwaffe) Signal Regiment, Control and Reporting Center Uedem
      - 3rd Btn, 33rd (Luftwaffe) Signal Regiment, Control and Reporting Center Brakel
      - V. Training Group, 2nd Luftwaffe Technical School, Control and Reporting Center Erndtebrück
      - Belgian Air Force, Control and Reporting Center Glons, Belgium
    - 4th Btn, 33rd (Luftwaffe) Regiment, Faßberg, with 12× mobile Radar systems forward deployed to the inner German border.
  - Royal Air Force Germany, RAF Rheindahlen (Mönchengladbach)
    - 4 Wing, administrative control of RAF Regiment Rapier squadrons based in West Germany
    - 33 Wing, administrative control of RAF Regiment Light Armour squadrons based in West Germany
    - RAF Bruggen, FRG
      - No. 9 Squadron, 12× Tornado GR.1^{note 1}
      - No. 14 Squadron, 12× Tornado GR.1^{note 1}
      - No. 17 Squadron, 12× Tornado GR.1^{note 1}
      - No. 31 Squadron, 12× Tornado GR.1^{note 1}
      - No. 37 Squadron RAF Regiment, (Air Defence, 8× Rapier launch stations)
      - No. 51 Squadron RAF Regiment, (Light Armour, 15× Spartan, 6× Scorpion)
    - RAF Gütersloh, FRG
      - No. 3 Squadron, 16× Harrier GR.5
      - No. 4 Squadron, 16× Harrier GR.5
      - No. 18 Squadron, 16× CH-47 Chinook (supporting British Army of the Rhine)
      - No. 230 Squadron, 16× Puma HC.1 (supporting British Army of the Rhine)
      - No. 63 Squadron RAF Regiment, (Air Defence, 8× Rapier launch stations)
    - RAF Laarbruch, FRG
      - No. 2 Squadron, 12× Tornado GR.1A (Reconnaissance)
      - No. 15 Squadron, 12× Tornado GR.1^{note 1}
      - No. 16 Squadron, 12× Tornado GR.1^{note 1}
      - No. 20 Squadron, 12× Tornado GR.1^{note 1}
      - No. 1 Squadron RAF Regiment, (Light Armour, 15× Spartan, 6× Scorpion)
      - No. 26 Squadron RAF Regiment, (Air Defence, 8× Rapier launch stations)
    - RAF Wildenrath, FRG
      - No. 19 Squadron, 16x Phantom FGR.2
      - No. 92 Squadron, 16x Phantom FGR.2
      - No. 60 Squadron, Andover CC.2 transport planes
      - No. 16 Squadron RAF Regiment, (Air Defence, 8× Rapier launch stations)
  - US Air Force
    - 485th Tactical Missile Wing, Florennes Air Base, BE
      - 71st Tactical Missile Squadron, 48× BGM-109G Ground Launched Cruise Missiles
    - Soesterberg Air Base, NL
      - 32d Tactical Fighter Group
        - 32d Tactical Fighter Squadron, 24× F-15C Eagle
      - No. 221 (Dutch) Squadron, (3× I-Hawk launch stations)
    - Nörvenich Air Base
      - Forward deployed detachment of the 81st Tactical Fighter Wing, 8× A-10A Thunderbolt II
    - Ahlhorn air base
      - Forward deployed detachment of the 81st Tactical Fighter Wing, 8× A-10A Thunderbolt II
    - Jever Air Base
      - Forward deployed detachment of the 81st Tactical Fighter Wing, 8× A-10A Thunderbolt II
  - Belgian Air Force
    - 1st Wing, Beauvechain Air Base
      - 349th Squadron, 24× F-16A Fighting Falcon
      - 350th Squadron, 24× F-16A Fighting Falcon
    - 2nd Wing, Florennes Air Base
      - 1st Squadron, 24× F-16A Fighting Falcon
      - 2nd Squadron, 24× F-16A Fighting Falcon
    - 3rd Wing, Bierset Air Base
      - 8th Squadron, 36× Mirage 5BA
      - 42nd Squadron, 22× Mirage 5BR (Reconnaissance)
    - 9th Wing, Sint-Truiden Air Base
      - 7th Squadron, 16× Alpha Jet's
      - 11th Squadron, 16× Alpha Jets
    - 10th Wing^{note 2}, Kleine Brogel Air Base
      - 23rd Squadron, 24× F-16A Fighting Falcon
      - 31st Squadron, 24× F-16A Fighting Falcon
    - Missile Wing, Düren, FRG
      - Wing Staff, Düren
      - 9th Operations Group, Grefrath, FRG
        - 54th Squadron, Xanten, (9x MIM-14 Nike Hercules launch stations, disbanded 1989)
        - 56th Squadron, Grefrath, (9x MIM-14 Nike Hercules launch stations)
      - 13th Operations Group, Düren, FRG
        - 50th Squadron, Düren, (9x MIM-14 Nike Hercules launch stations)
        - 51st Squadron, Blankenheim, (9x MIM-14 Nike Hercules launch stations, disbanded 1989)
      - Missile Support Group, Düren, FRG
  - Belgian Army
    - 43rd Artilleriebataljon, Brakel
      - A/43rd Company, Beverungen with 6× MIM-23 Hawk stations
      - B/43rd Company, Höxter with 6× Hawk launch stations
      - C/43rd Company, Brakel with 6× Hawk launch stations
      - D/43rd Company, Bad Driburg 6× Hawk launch stations
    - 62nd Artilleriebataljon, Essentho
      - A/62nd Company, Korbach with 6× MIM-23 Hawk stations
      - B/62nd Company, Wolfhagen with 6× Hawk launch stations
      - C/62nd Company, Essentho with 6× Hawk launch stations
      - D/62nd Company, Diemelstadt 6× Hawk launch stations
  - Royal Netherlands Air Force
    - Eindhoven Air Base
      - No. 316 Fighter/Bomber Squadron, 18× NF-5A Freedom Fighter
      - No. 422 Squadron, (3× I-Hawk launch stations & 3× Flycatcher/Bofors 40L70 AAA)
    - Gilze-Rijen Air Base
      - No. 314 Fighter/Bomber Squadron, 18× NF-5A Freedom Fighter
      - No. 121 Squadron, (3x I-Hawk launch stations & 3× Flycatcher/Bofors 40L70 AAA)
    - Leeuwarden Air Base
      - No. 322 Fighter/Bomber Squadron, 24× F-16A Fighting Falcon
      - No. 323 Fighter/Bomber Squadron, 24× F-16A Fighting Falcon
      - No. 119 Squadron, (3x I-Hawk launch stations & 3× Flycatcher/Bofors 40L70 AAA)
    - Twente Air Base
      - No. 313 Fighter/Bomber Squadron, 24× F-16A Fighting Falcon
      - No. 315 Fighter/Bomber Squadron, 24× F-16A Fighting Falcon
      - No. 222 Squadron, (3× I-Hawk launch stations & 3× Flycatcher/Bofors 40L70 AAA)
    - Volkel Air Base
      - No. 306 Reconnaissance Squadron, 18× F-16A F-16A Fighting Falcon (Reconnaissance)
      - No. 311 Fighter/Bomber Squadron, 24× F-16A F-16A Fighting Falcon^{note 2}
      - No. 312 Fighter/Bomber Squadron, 24× F-16A F-16A Fighting Falcon^{note 2}
      - No. 420 Squadron, (3× I-Hawk launch stations & 3× Flycatcher/Bofors 40L70 AAA)
    - De Peel Air Base (for reinforcements)
      - No. 421 Squadron, (3× I-Hawk launch stations & 3× Flycatcher/Bofors 40L70 AAA)
    - 3rd Guided Weapons Group, Blomberg
      - No. 324 Squadron, Aerzen with 6× I-Hawk launch stations
      - No. 326 Squadron, Horn-Bad Meinberg with 6× I-Hawk launch stations
      - No. 327 Squadron, Schwelentrup with 5× MIM-104 Patriot launch stations
      - No. 328 Squadron, Schwalenberg with 5× Patriot launch stations
    - 5th Guided Weapons Group, Stolzenau
      - No. 500 Squadron, Borstel with 6× I-Hawk launch stations
      - No. 501 Squadron, Winzlar with 6× I-Hawk launch stations
      - No. 502 Squadron, Hoysinghausen with 5× Patriot launch stations
      - No. 503 Squadron, Reinsdorf with 5× Patriot launch stations
  - German Air Force
    - 3rd Luftwaffendivision, Kalkar
      - Geilenkirchen
        - Missile Wing 2, 4× squadrons with 9× Pershing 1a each
      - Nörvenich Air Base
        - Jagdbombergeschwader 31^{note 2}, 2× squadrons with 16× Tornado IDS each, and 6× Tornado IDS in reserve
      - Rheine-Hopsten Air Base
        - Jagdbombergeschwader 36, 2x squadrons with 15× F-4F Phantom II each, and 15× F-4F in reserve
      - Jever Air Base
        - Jagdbombergeschwader 38, 1st squadron with 24× Tornados IDS (Tornado Weapons Training Sqn.), 2nd squadron with 16× Tornado ECR, and 4× Tornado IDS in reserve
      - Oldenburg Air Base
        - Jagdbombergeschwader 43, 2x squadrons with 18× Alpha Jet's each, and 8× Alpha Jets in reserve
    - 4th Luftwaffendivision, Aurich
      - Wittmundhafen Air Base
        - Jagdgeschwader 71, 2× squadrons with 15× F-4F Phantom II each, and 4× F-4F in reserve
      - 1st Air Defense Missile Command, Heide
        - 26th Air Defense Missile Wing, Heide, with 6× MIM-104 Patriot squadrons; each with 1× Engagement Control Station, 1× Radar Set, 8× launch stations
        - 37th Air Defense Missile Wing, Cuxhaven, with 4× MIM-23 Hawk squadrons; each with 6× launch stations
        - 39th Air Defense Missile Wing, Eckernförde, with 4× MIM-23 Hawk squadrons; each with 6× launch stations
      - 2nd Air Defense Missile Command, Bremervörde
        - 24th Air Defense Missile Wing, Delmenhorst, with 6× MIM-104 Patriot squadrons; each with 1× Engagement Control Station, 1× Radar Set, 8× launch stations
        - 31st Air Defense Missile Wing, Westertimke, with 4× MIM-23 Hawk squadrons; each with 6× launch stations
        - 36th Air Defense Missile Wing, Bremervörde, with 4× MIM-23 Hawk squadrons; each with 6× launch stations
      - 3rd Air Defense Missile Command, Oldenburg
        - 25th Air Defense Missile Wing, Eydelstedt, with 6× MIM-104 Patriot squadrons; each with 1× Engagement Control Station, 1× Radar Set, 8× launch stations
        - 35th Air Defense Missile Wing, Delmenhorst, with 4× MIM-23 Hawk squadrons; each with 6× launch stations
        - 41st Air Defense Missile Group, Wangerland, with 16× Roland systems guarding Jever, Hopsten and Wittmundhafen Air Base
      - 33rd Signal Regiment, Goch
      - 34th Signal Regiment, Alt Duvenstedt

Note 1: Royal Air Force unit with nuclear strike role with 18x WE.177 tactical nuclear weapons. Note 2: Nuclear sharing unit capable of delivering B61 tactical nuclear weapons.

== See also ==
- Fourth Allied Tactical Air Force
