= NORTHAG War Headquarters Cannerberg =

Cold War-era NATO communications center and wartime HQ in Belgium

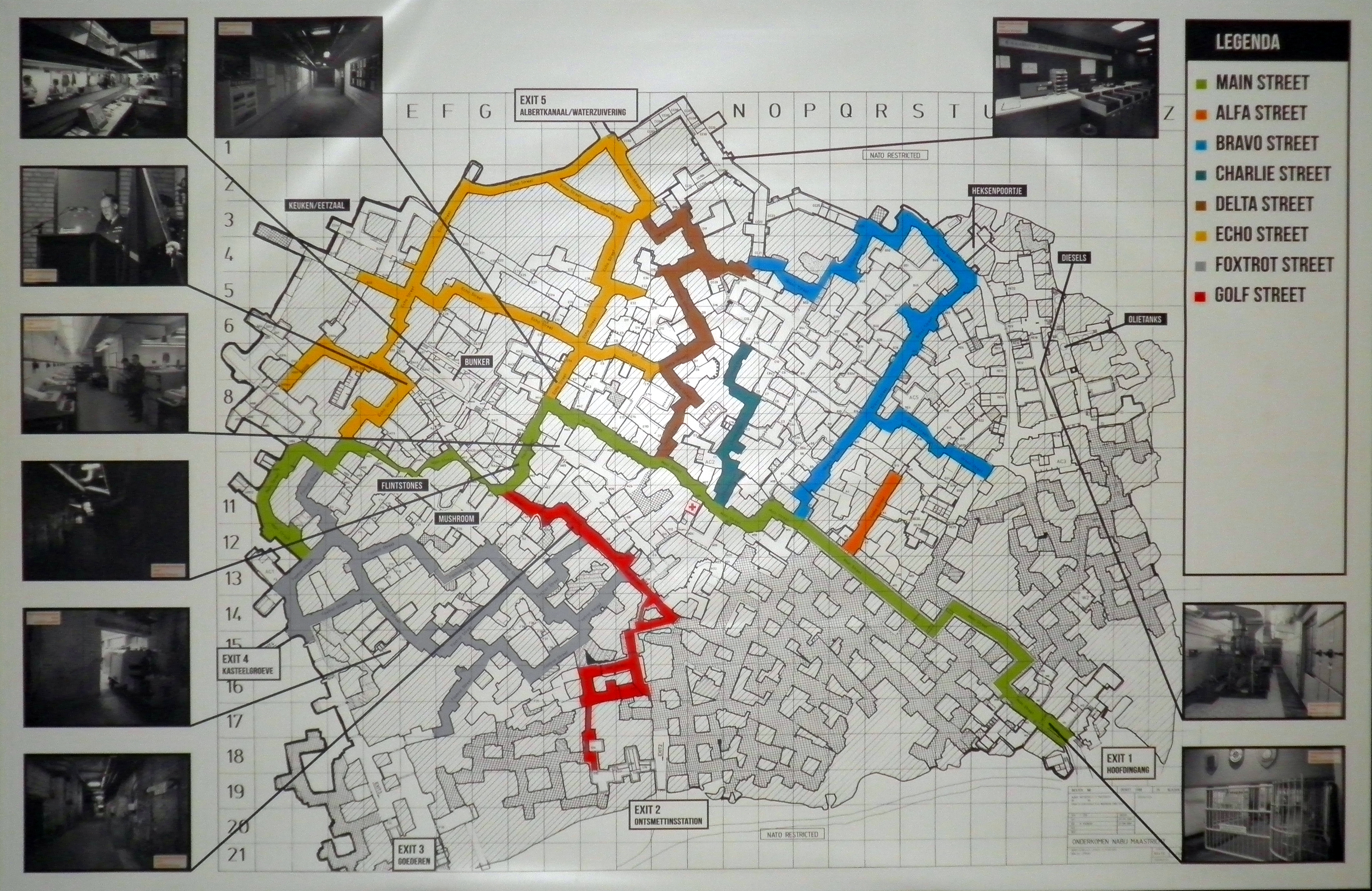
Map of NATO Headquarters Cannerberg

NATO Headquarters Cannerberg / Joint Operations Centre (JOC), located behind the Château Neercanne South of Maastricht, on the Dutch/Belgian border, was, during the Cold War, a communications center and headquarters of NATO. It housed the war headquarters of Northern Army Group and Second Allied Tactical Air Force.

== History ==
=== Period 1954-1993 Cold War ===
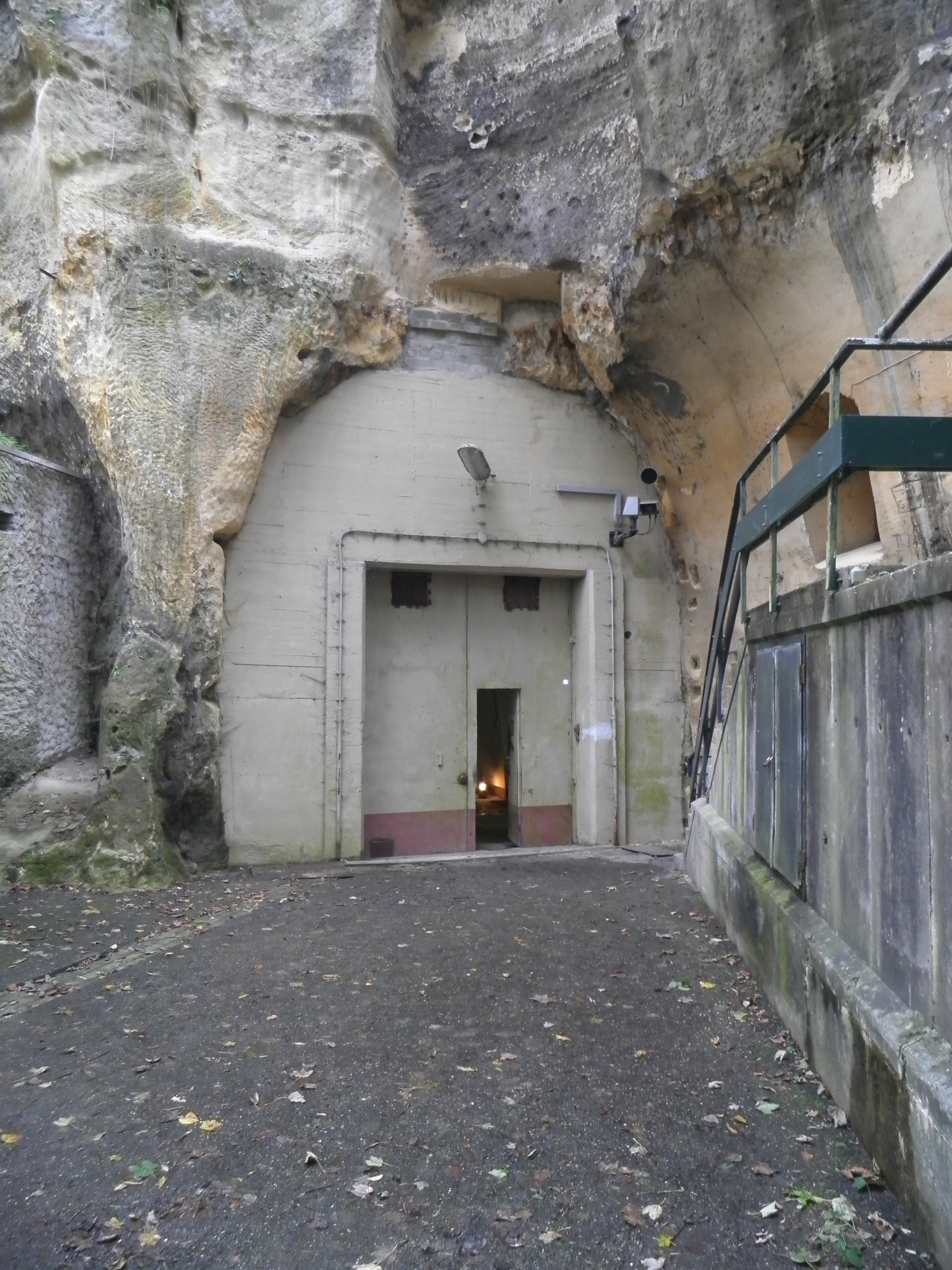
Entrance - outdoor

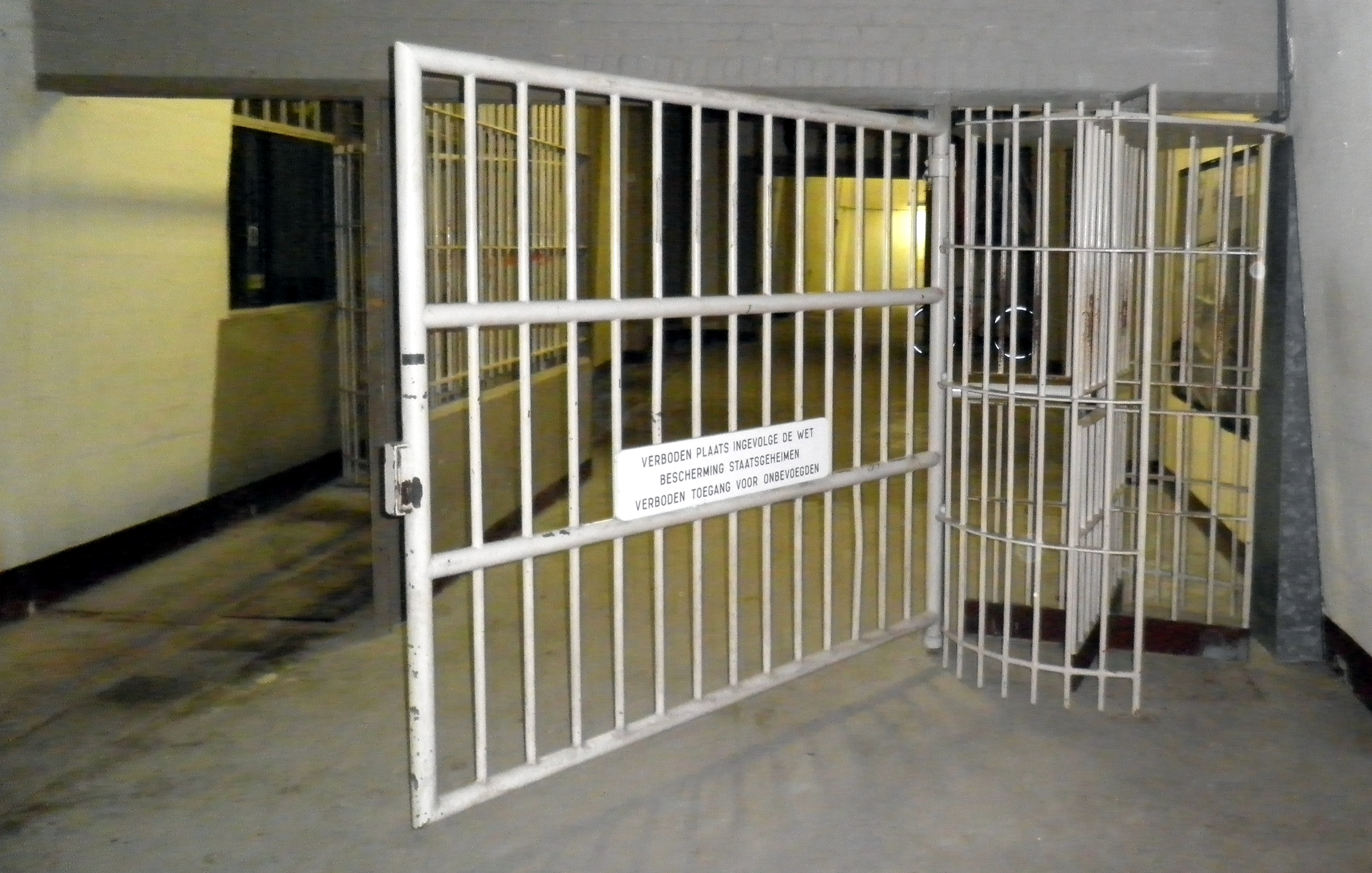
Entrance - within

As from 1954 the "boschberg quarry/Cannerberg" was leased by the then Ministry of War for a period of 50 years. On April 15, 1954 an agreement was reached by the war Department, Stichting Limburgs Landschap (Foundation Limburg Landscape), freule Louise E.M. Poswick (owner of the Château Neercanne since 1947) and the Jesuit monks from Maastricht devoting the Cannerberg to use by the armed forces.

==== Format ====
The floor of this quarry had already been concreted by the Germans, and had also been equipped with electric lighting. Since the complex is in a former quarry, it is a maze of corridors. These are structured around a central avenue dubbed "Main Street", with streets named Alpha to Golf Street after the NATO alphabet radiating outwards counterclockwise. The offices in the hallways were numbered from low to high, starting at 1 from Main Street.

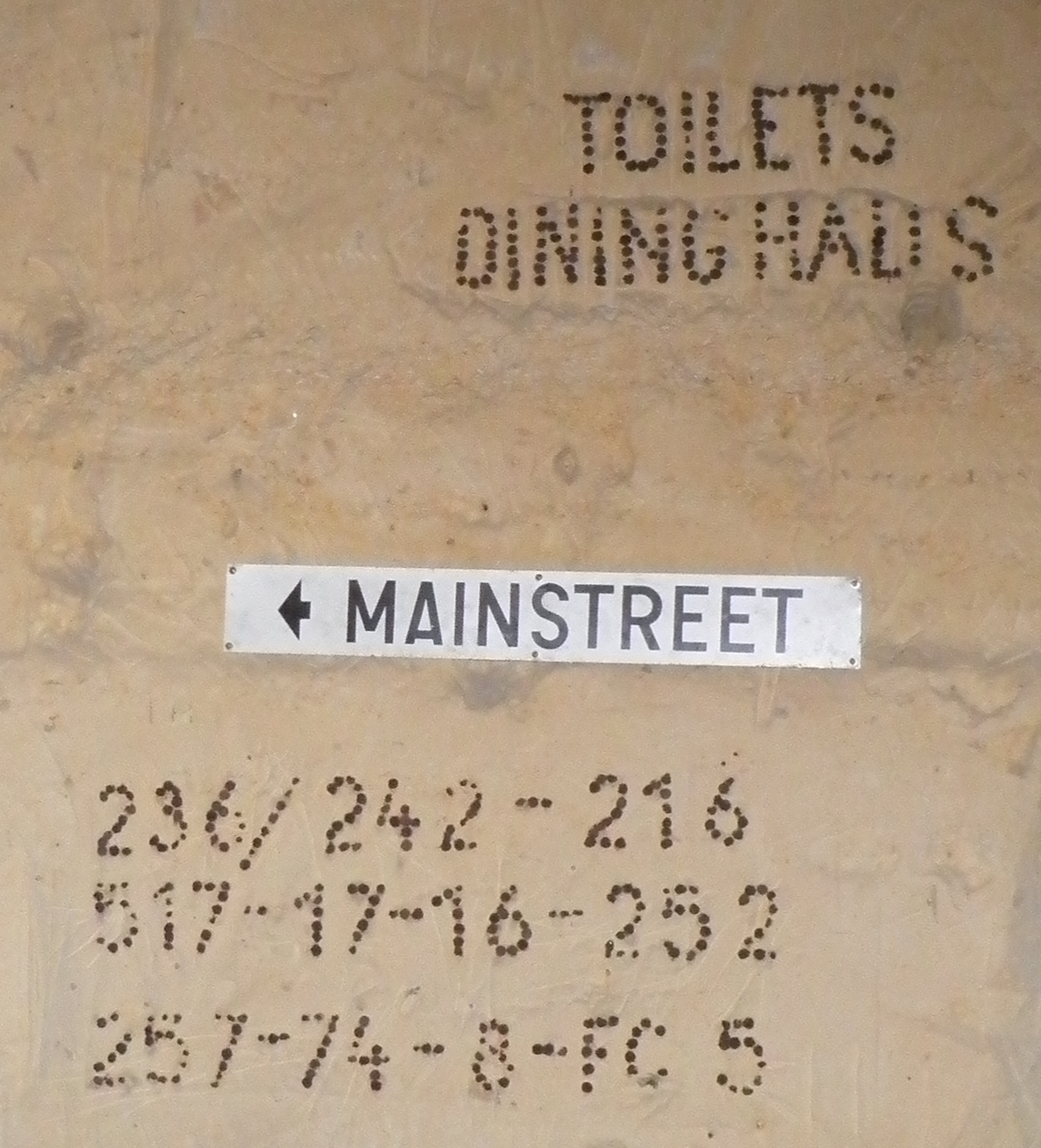

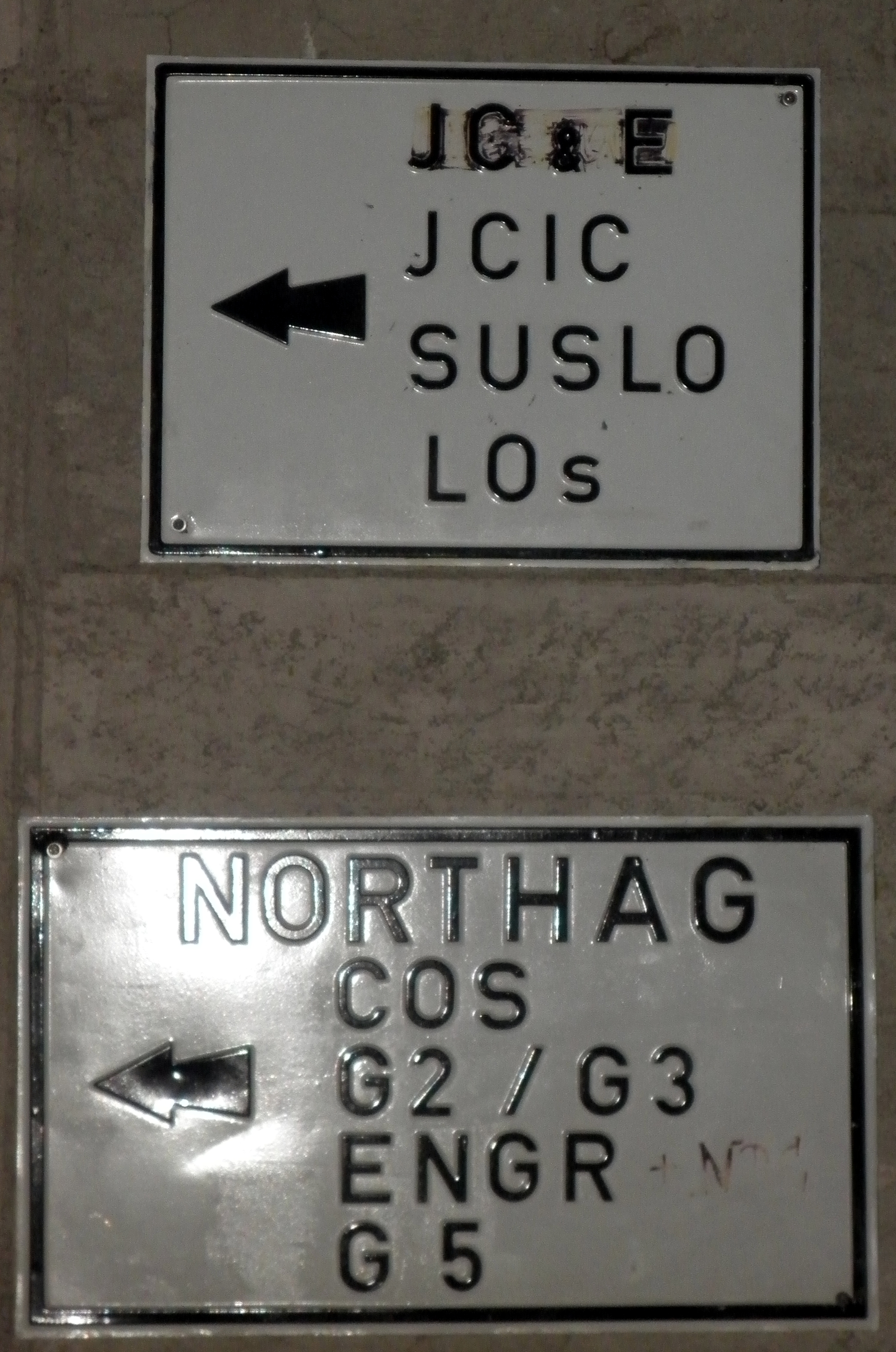

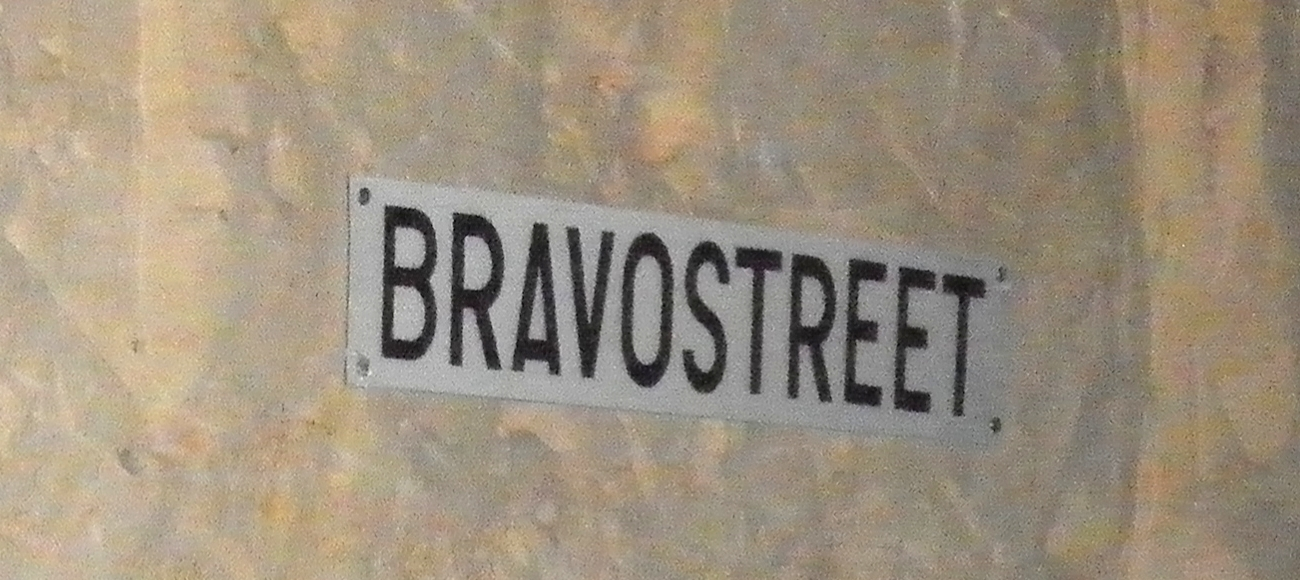

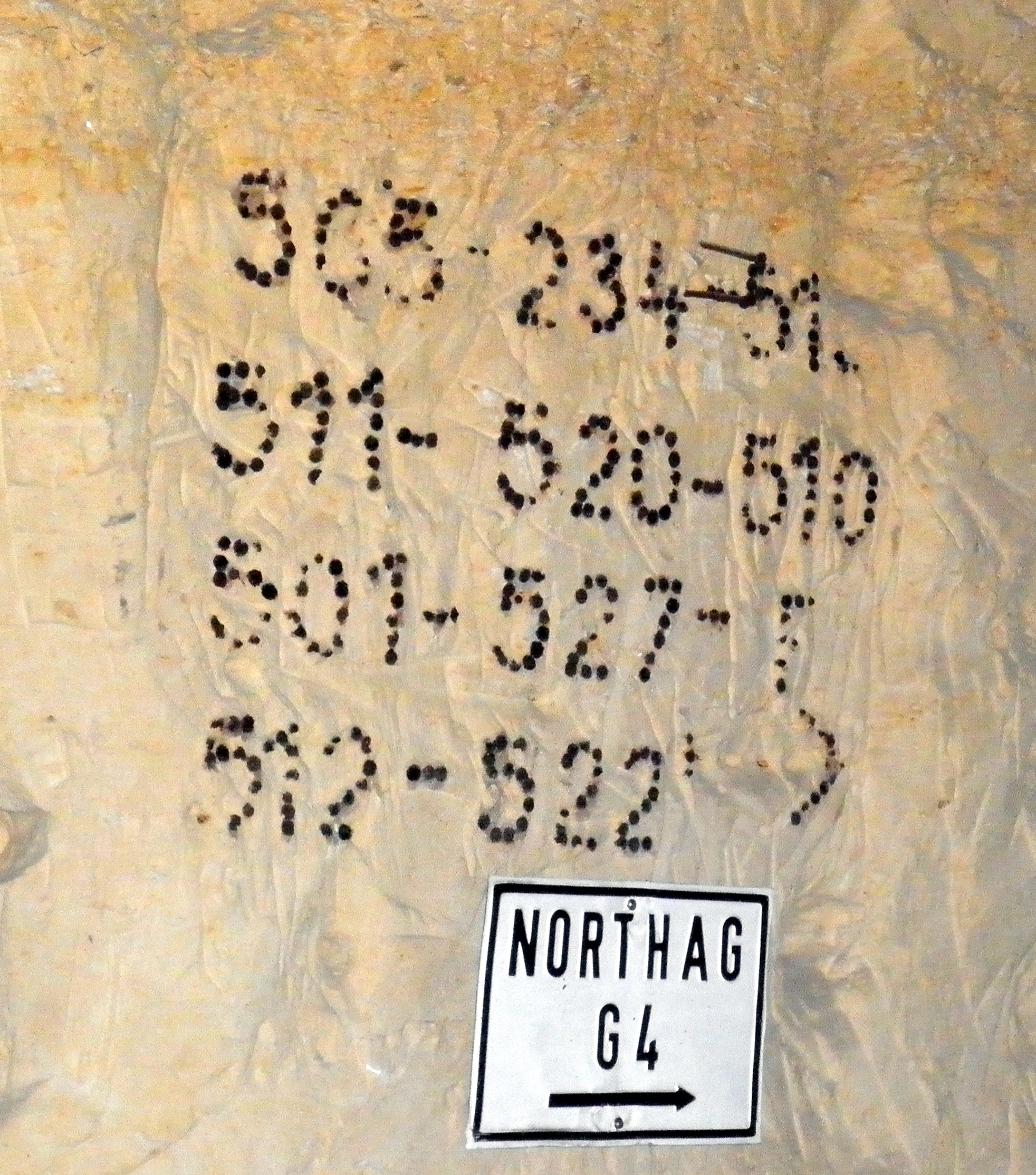

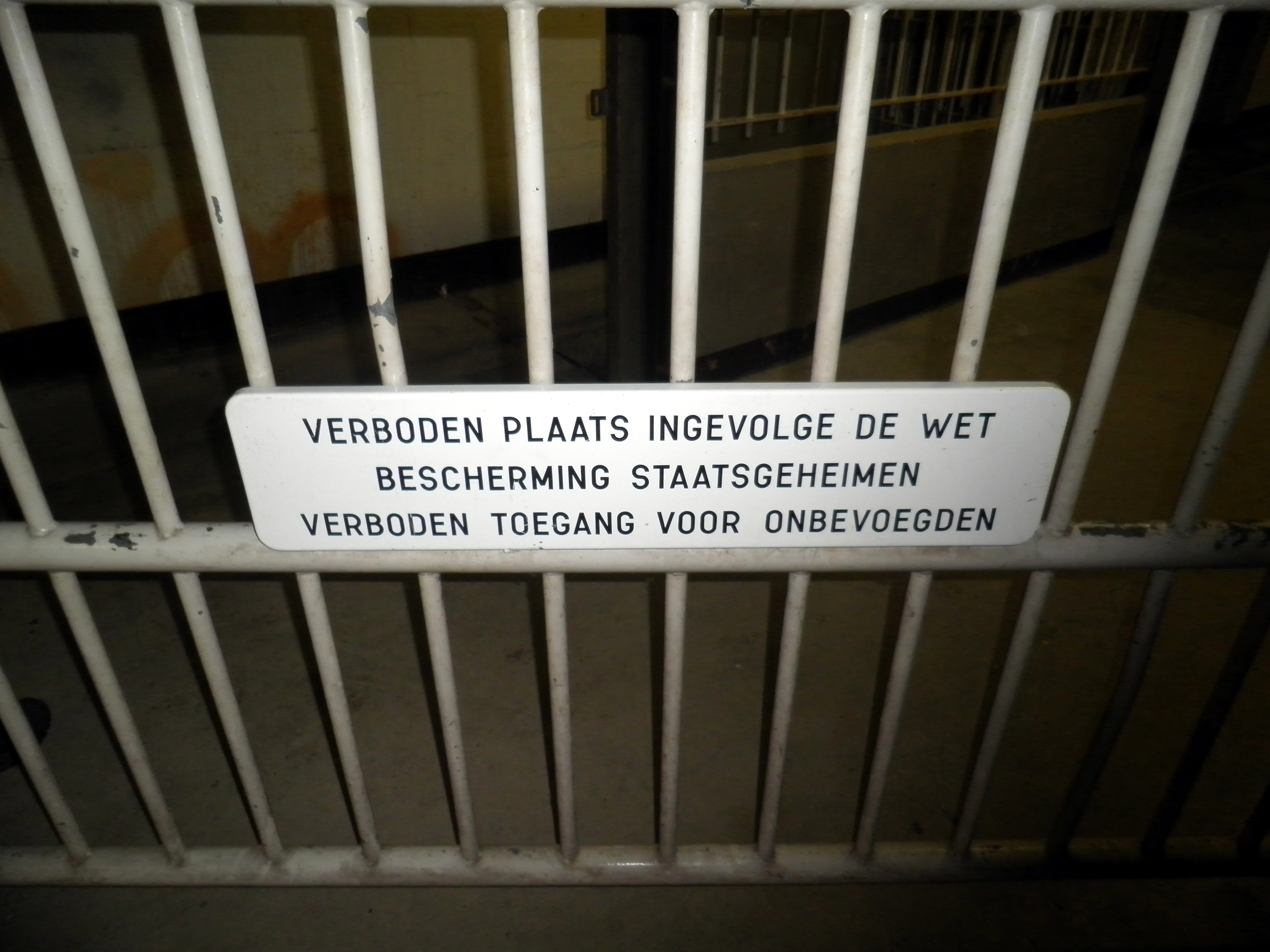
"No access"

In 1955 was in the quarry by NATO an interim war headquarters located: "a temporary site to be used only in war". From 17 February 1956 got the Headquarters as "ultra secret" because it's from that moment at Royal Decree was placed under the Law on State secrets. November 20, 1980 in the edition of weekly magazine Vox of the Belgian Armed Forces was reported on this secret underground NATO Headquarters: "somewhere in the region of Maastricht".

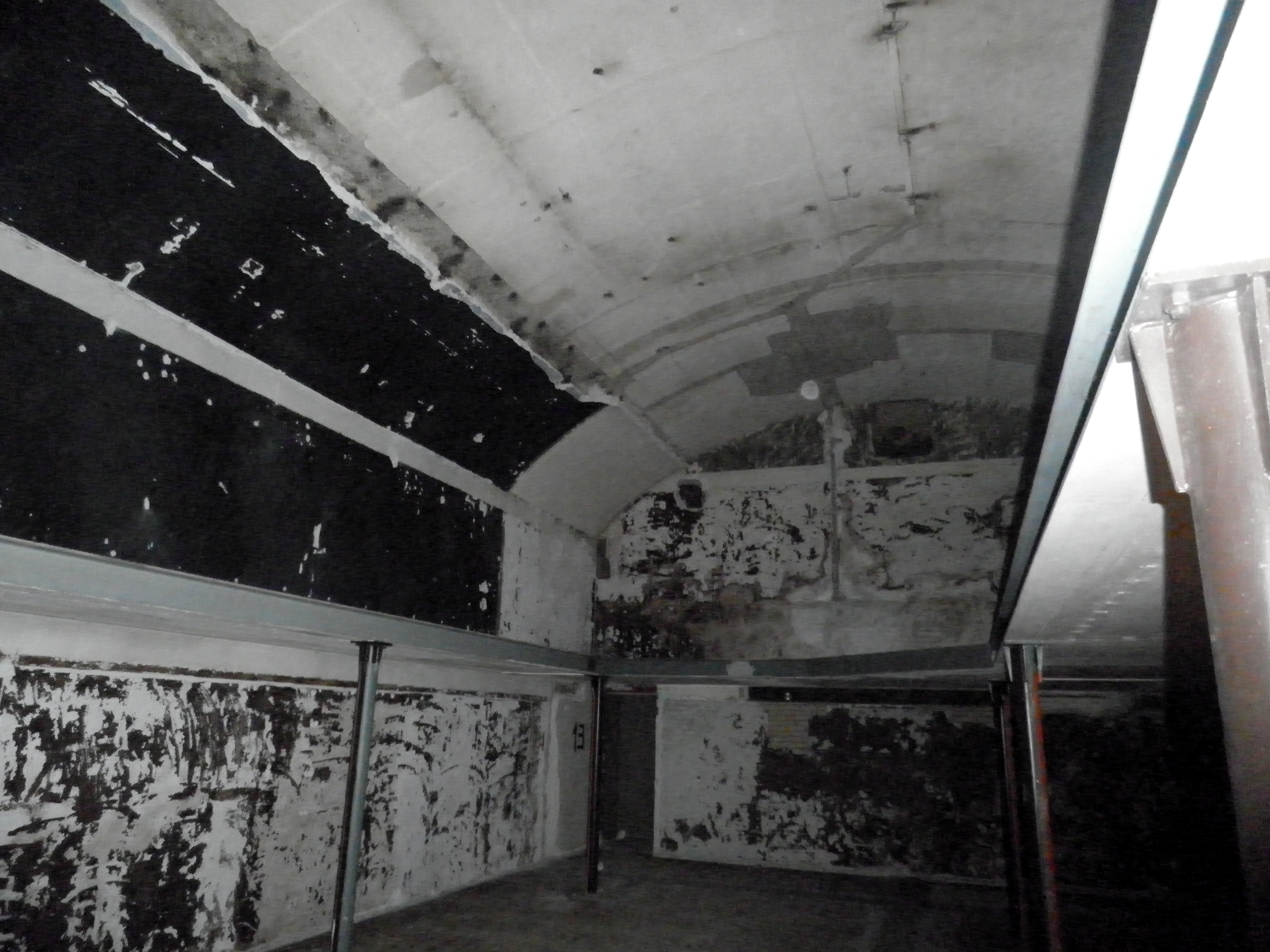
Bunker

As a result of the construction of the Iron Curtain got the bunker also from 1 July 1963 in peacetime a permanent (24 hours a day, all year) military occupation. From that time there were during the day such a 300-400 Dutch, Belgian, German, English and American soldiers about 40 persons, active at night and at multiple-day exercises up to 1000 people. Should the war break out, then could the regional headquarters of the 2nd Allied Tactical Air Force (2ATAF) immediately from the German Rheindahlen (near Mönchengladbach), where it was housed in peacetime, be moved to this location. Also was Allied Tactical Operations Centre (ATOC) in the complex. This organization would be if necessary, give commands to the offensive on behalf of 2ATAF aircraft. In addition it was here the command of the Northern Army Group (NORTHAG, Northern army group). This command covered the Dutch, British, Belgian, German and possibly American country units in the North of West Germany. In the event of war it would be Joint Operations Centre (JOC) with forward command posts and their units by means of the communication system of the NATO Air Defence Ground Environment (J). During the cold war was a special task for the Delta company 30 Natresbat Tactical Natrescompagniestaf Nr. 16. According to the operation plan of the then National Territorial Command in Gouda would this staff with 3 Natres platoons upon the issue of 'telegram N' under the command of the NATO commander of the Northern Army Group to secure the JOC of the Northern Army Group/Second Allied Tactical Air Force (NORTHAG/TWO ATAF STATIC) in the Cannerberg and the NATO Information and Communication System (NICS) near Maastricht.

==== Facilities ====
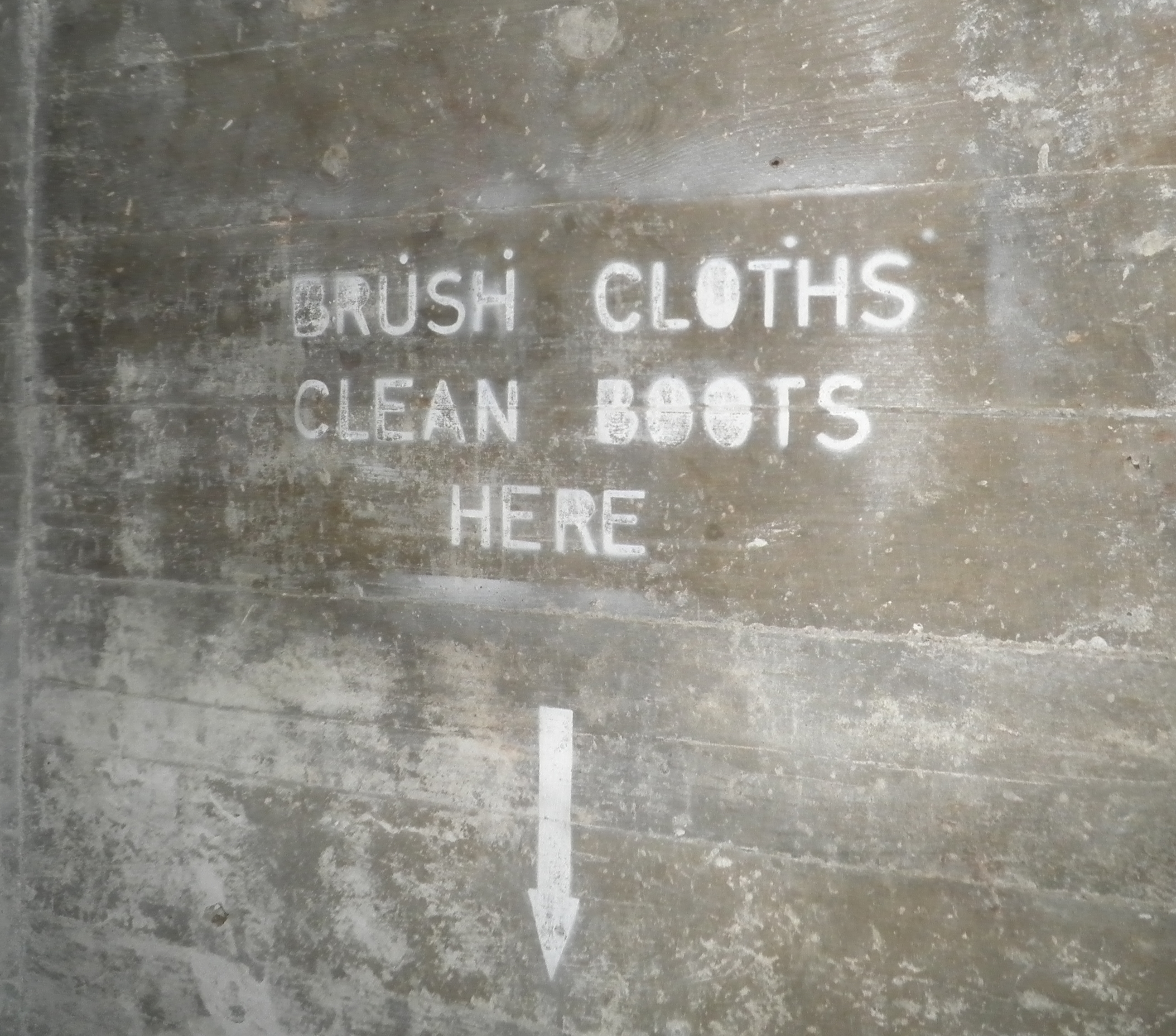
Disinfection

In this headquarters was via a heating system/air conditioning a constant temperature of 18 degrees Celsius reached with the desired humidity level. The headquarters had an independent water supply and marine diesel engines were as equipment used in the event of a break in the supply of electricity within the public network. In the mountain was a present so that excess pressure at a weapon of mass destruction - nuclear, biological or chemical attack outside the hazardous substances were held. For such an NBC attack was also a special present with shower entrance lock. The entrance doors and access corridors were resistant to the pressure wave of an explosion. Under the command of the NATO commander of the Northern Army Group to secure the JOC of the Northern Army Group/Second Allied Tactical Air Force (NORTHAG/TWO ATAF STATIC) in the Cannerberg and the NATO Information and Communication System (NICS) near Maastricht.

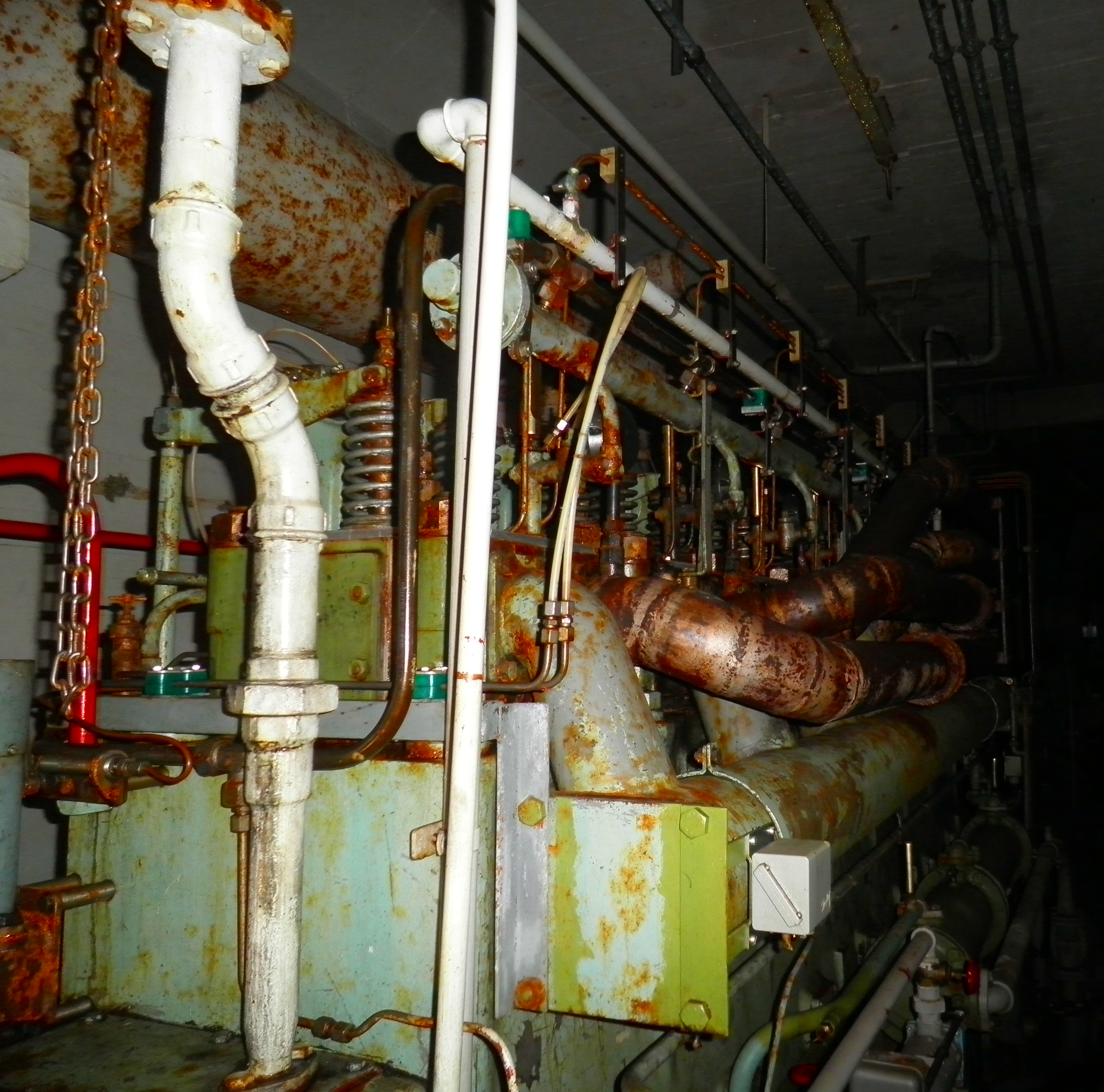
Power pack

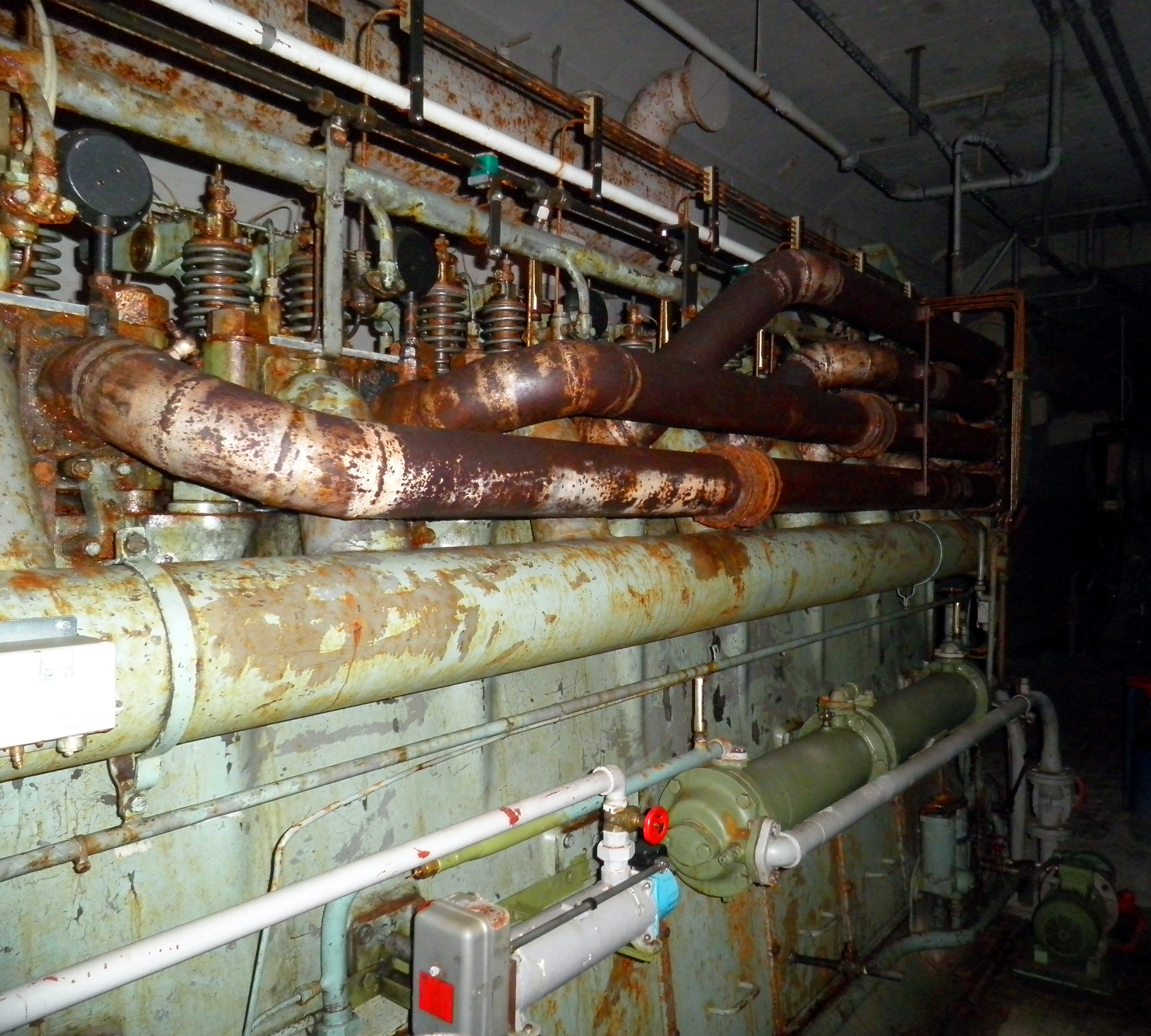
Power pack

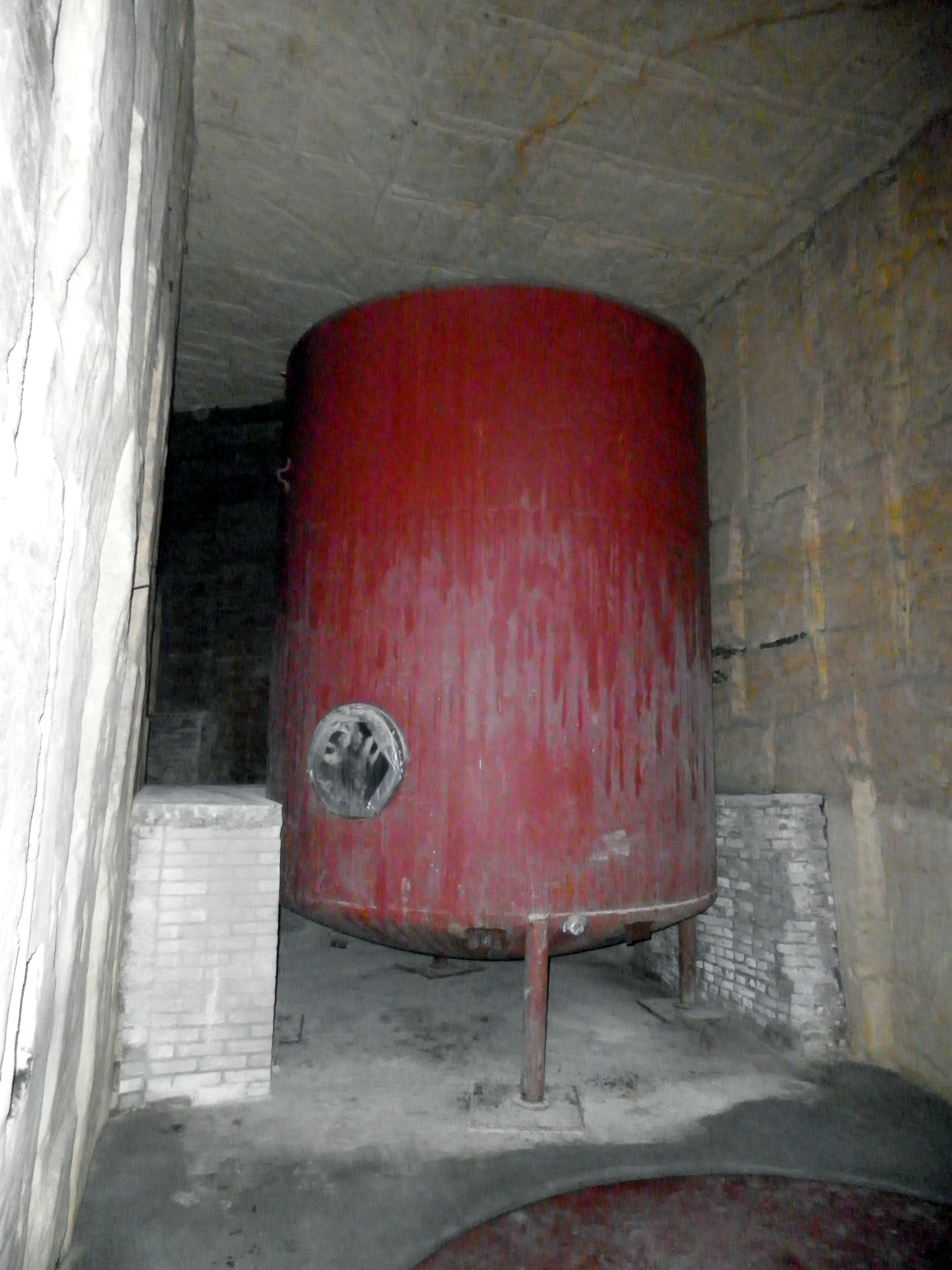
Oil tank

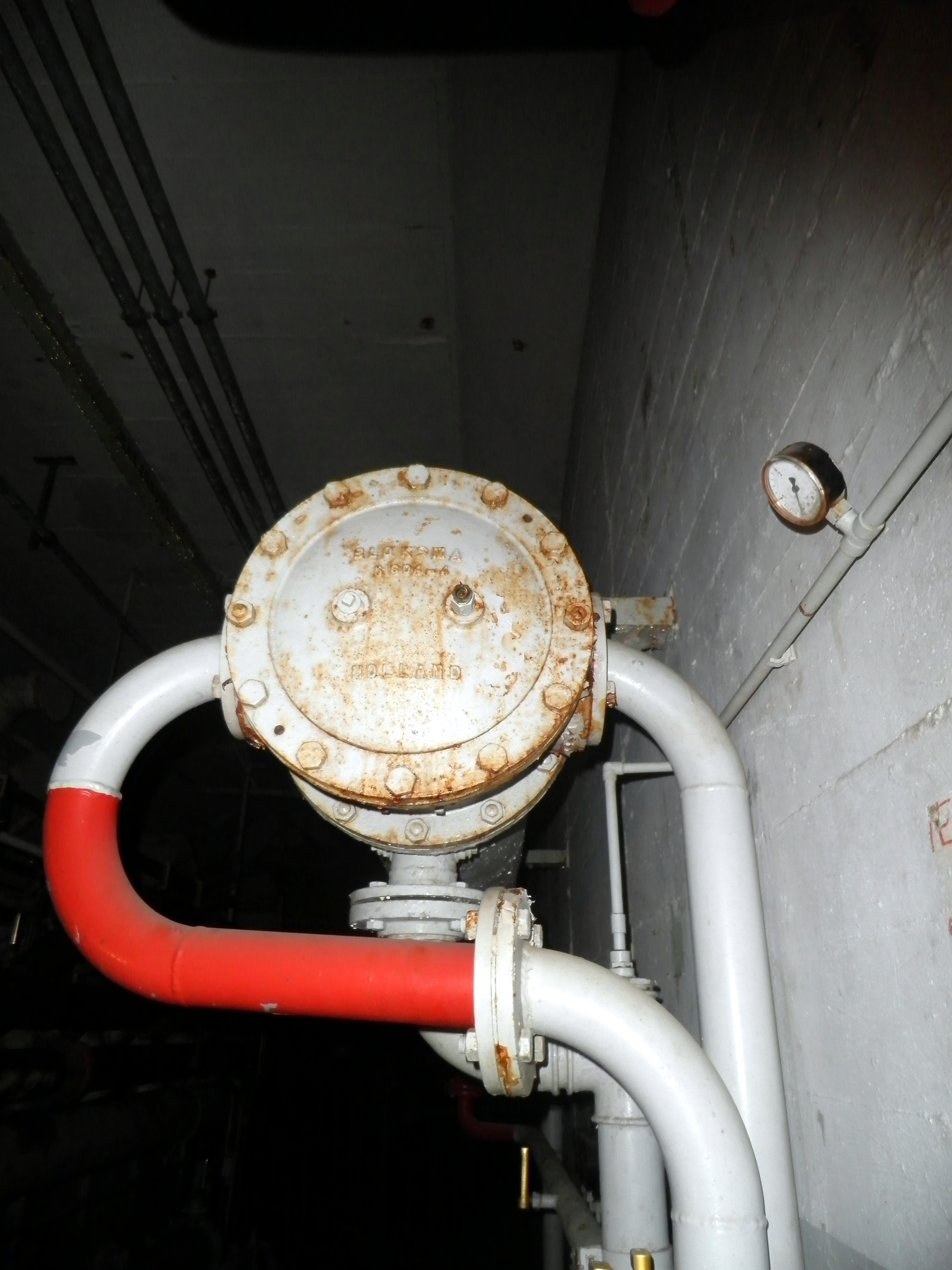

===== Trivia =====
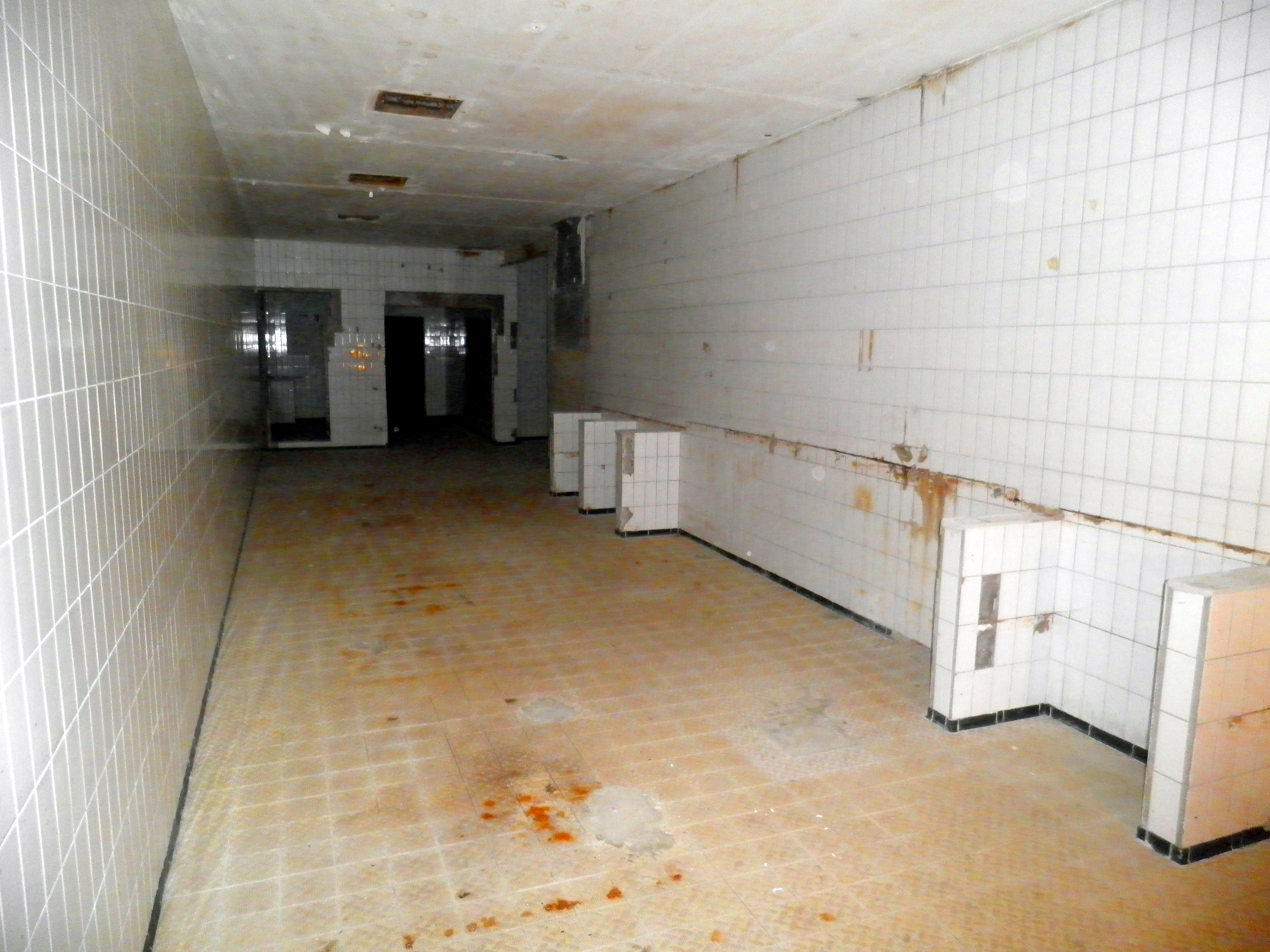
Kitchen

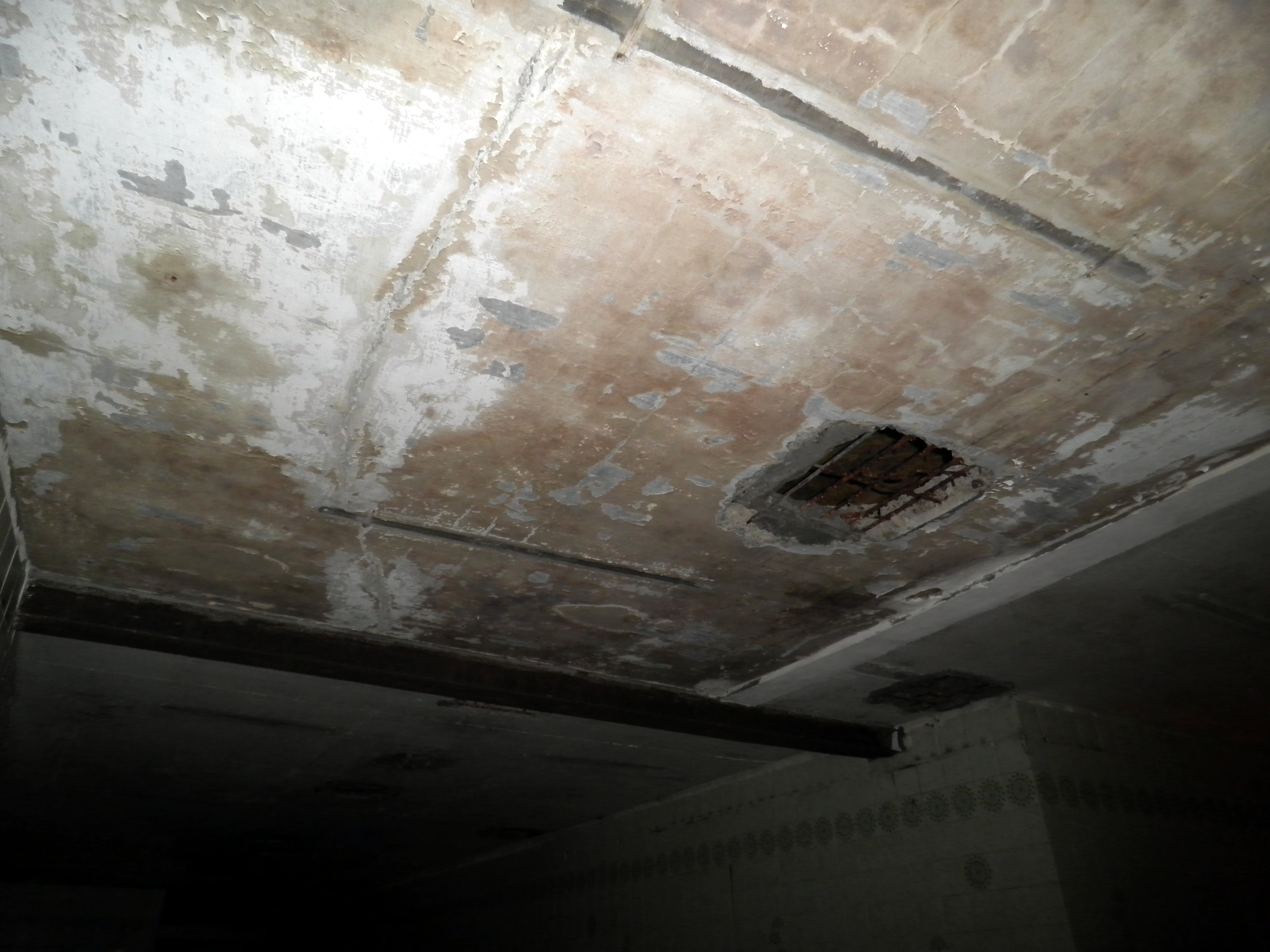
Kitchen ceiling

- Depth up to 50 meters (54.6 yard) below the ground;
- Total area of ± 6.75 hectares;
- 8 km (4.9 miles) of corridors;
- 400 offices;
- 51 toilets, 31 urinals, 27 showers and 75 washbasins;
- 4482 fluorescent lamps;
- 2 restaurants - the self-service restaurant had a capacity of 600 meals;
- hair salon;
- 3-hole golf course with artificial grass.

==== Asbestos ====
Initially the tubes in the mountain insulated with Cork. After a fire and the long nasmeulen of the insulation material, it was decided to isolate the pipes with asbestos. In that time, the health risks of asbestos was still unknown and seen as a panacea. However new insights have led to TNO in 1991 by order of the Ministry of defence got to do research in the Cannerberg. Some results from the resulting report: 'On various ceilings were flakes blue asbestos observed.', 'three of the ten air samples contain too much asbestos fibers.' and 'the dust in the air ducts is seriously contaminated.' ('Cannerberg', TNO, Asbestos measurement in the 3 December 1991). The conclusion of the researchers was that by ' the serious health risk, which is associated with exposure to asbestos fibres, is ' very urgent intervention. The planned closure was, however, at the end of 1994, the Department of Defense and NATO decided that the Cannerberg would remain in use until that date. By the end of the cold war, however, in 1992 the Cannerberg was closed. The Alliance left the Cannerberg in 1993.

=== Period 2003 - 24 January 2012 remediation ===
Service real estate Defense has commissioned by the Dutch Ministry of defense from 2003 40 million euros a year to clean-up operation 7 the complex to free up asbestos fibers. The complex is almost completely stripped. Suspended ceilings including pipes are removed and the asbestos fibers are of the marl walls and ceilings been stripped down. In this period is also the waste removed (about 10000-14000 cubic meters) that was stored on 16 locations. It was not drained out to espionage. Also there was oil in the layers under the complex. These layers are up to 13 meters deep excavated.

Result: the following amounts of waste were disposed of:

- 9.3 million km (5.7 million miles) of asbestos-containing material
- 2.9 million kilograms (6.3 million pounds) with oil-contaminated marl

=== Period 24 January 2012 - present tour/art ===
On January 24, 2012 has defense the Cannerberg returns to Stichting Limburgs landscape. From September 2013 is it possible to login after a 2-hour tour, provided by the guides of the Limburg Landscape Foundation. Cost of a tour are 6 euros per person. Registration is possible through the site of the Limburgs landscape. The artist Rob Scholte operates in the exhibit Cannerberg work under the title: 'Shelter'. The work with the name N8W8 is a reference to The night watch by Rembrandt that along with other world-famous paintings during the World War II was hidden in the Sint-Pietersberg. N8W8 sets the back of an embroidered night watch for.

== Gallery ==
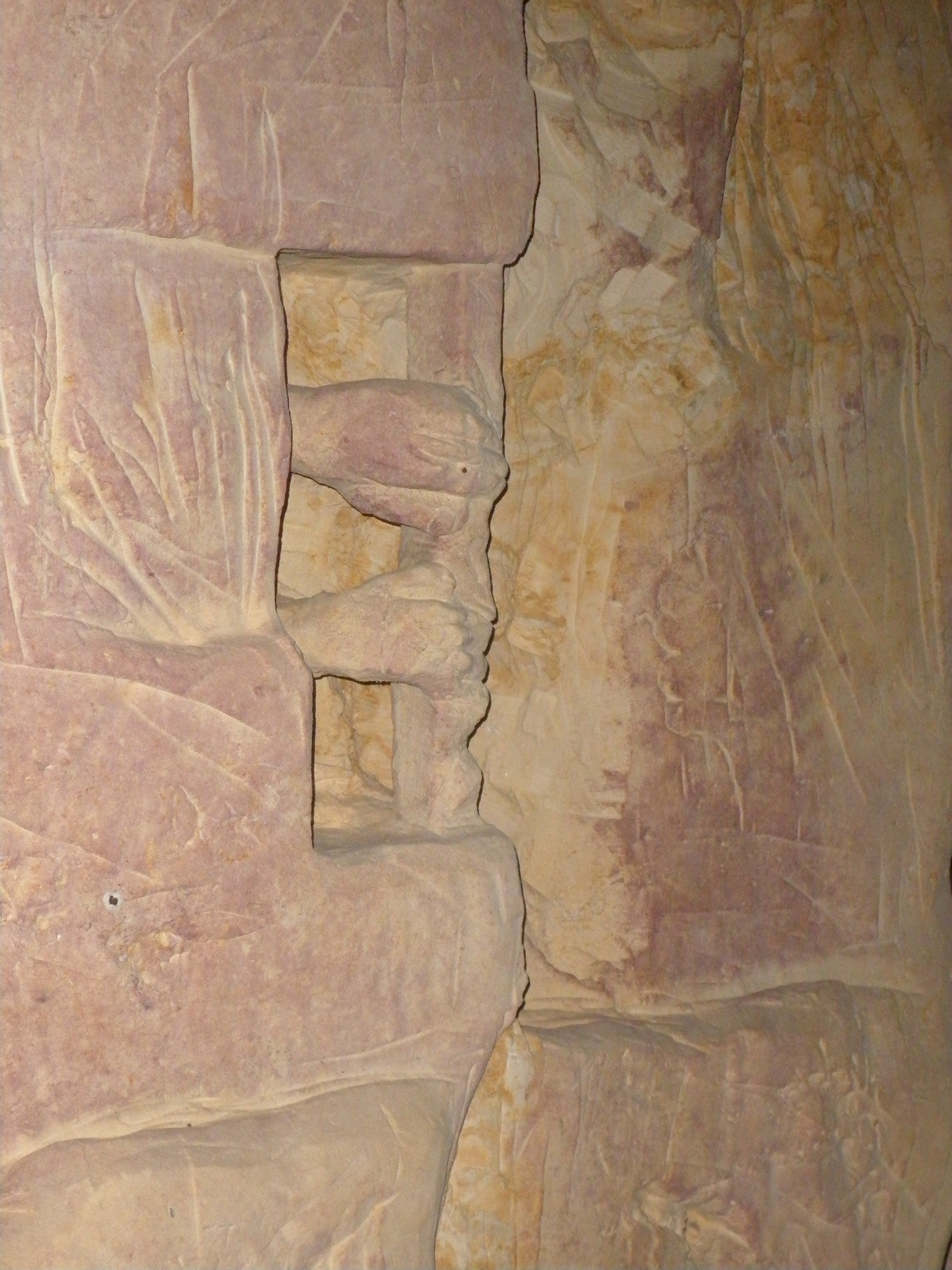
Art hands in marl

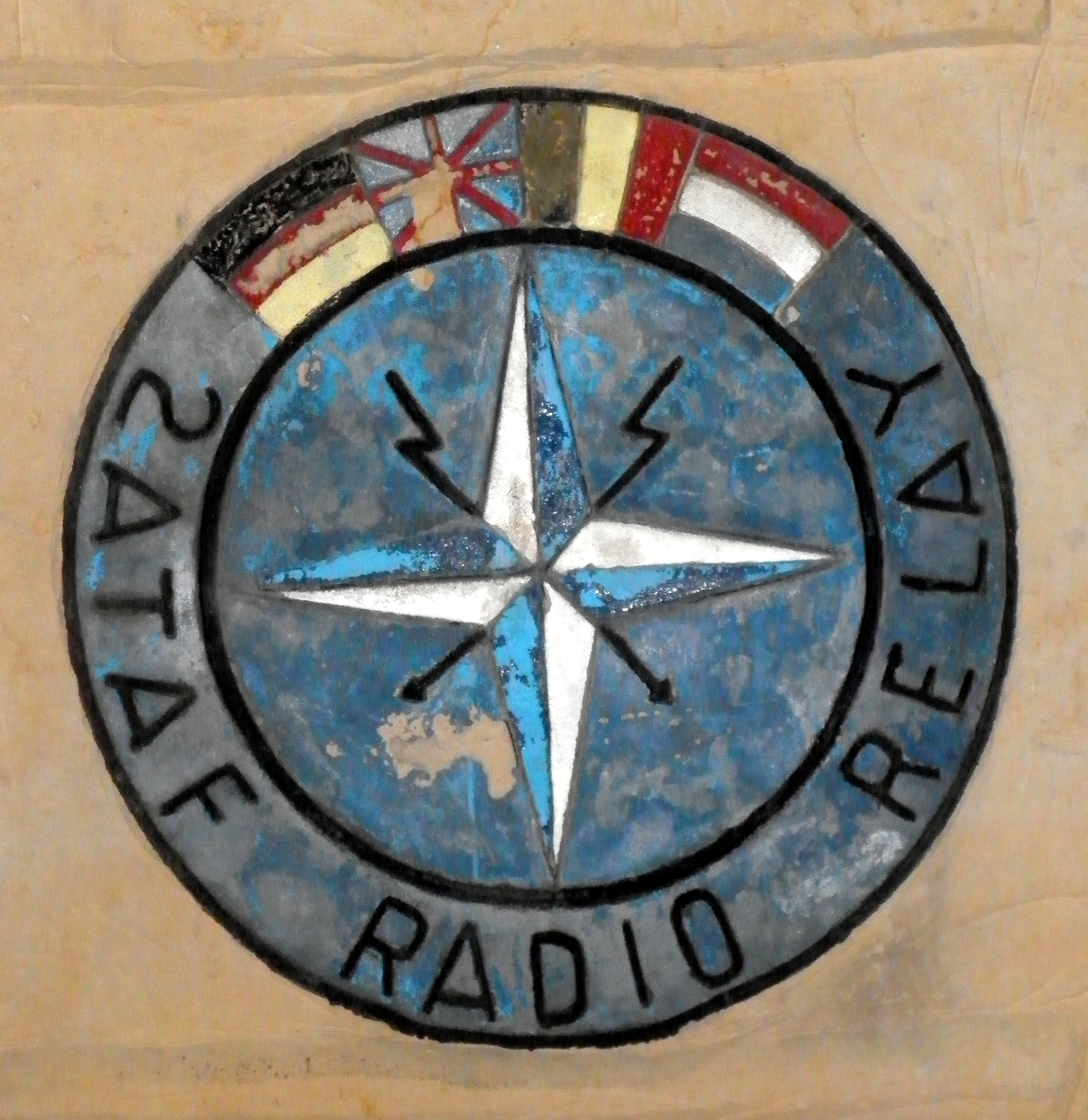
2ATAF Radio Relay

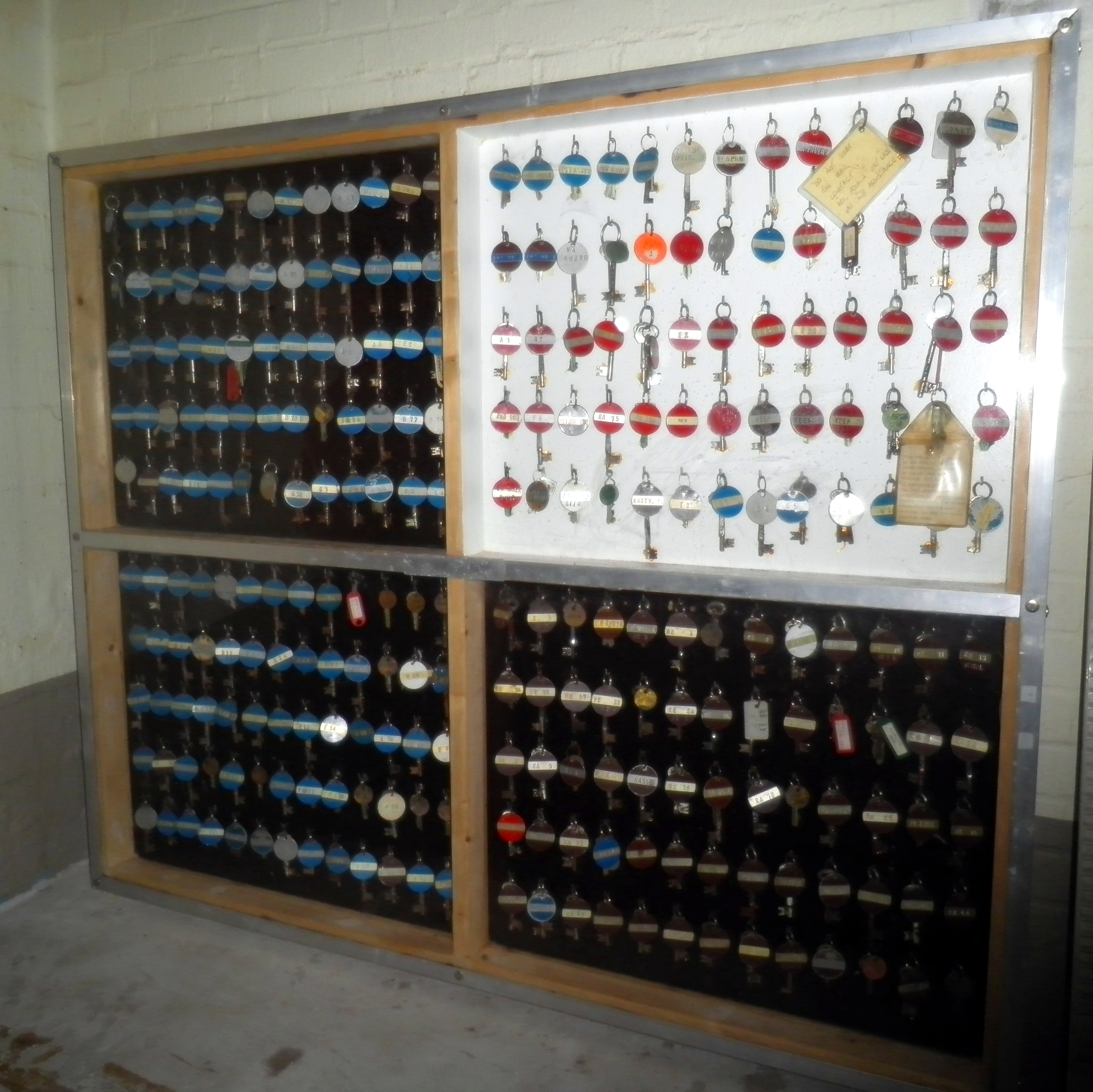
Keys

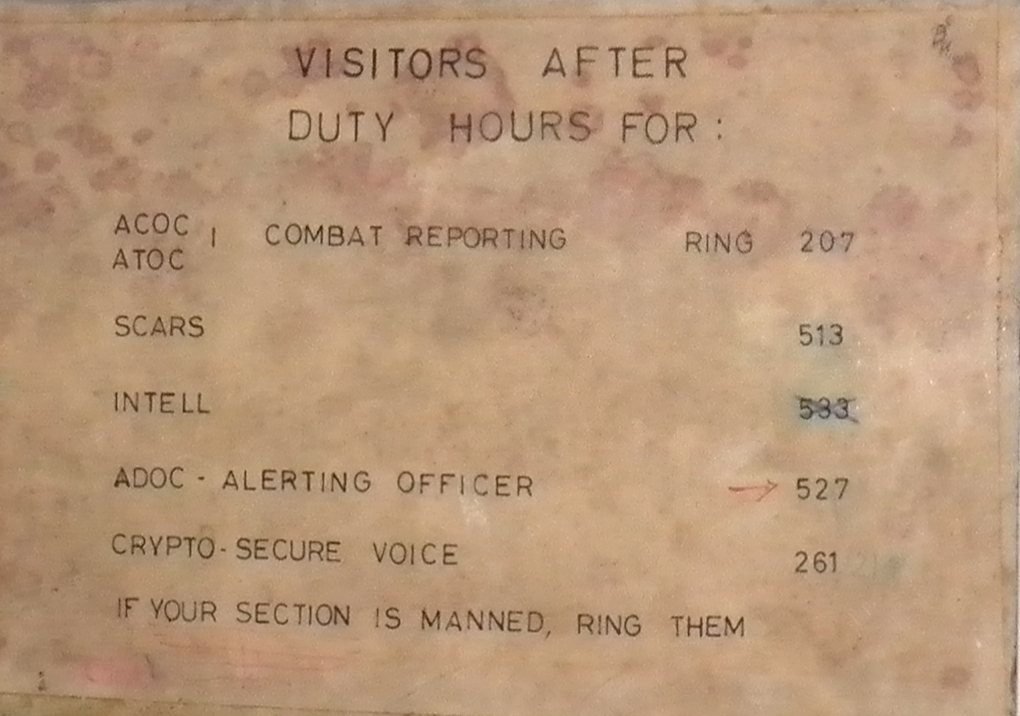
Phone numbers

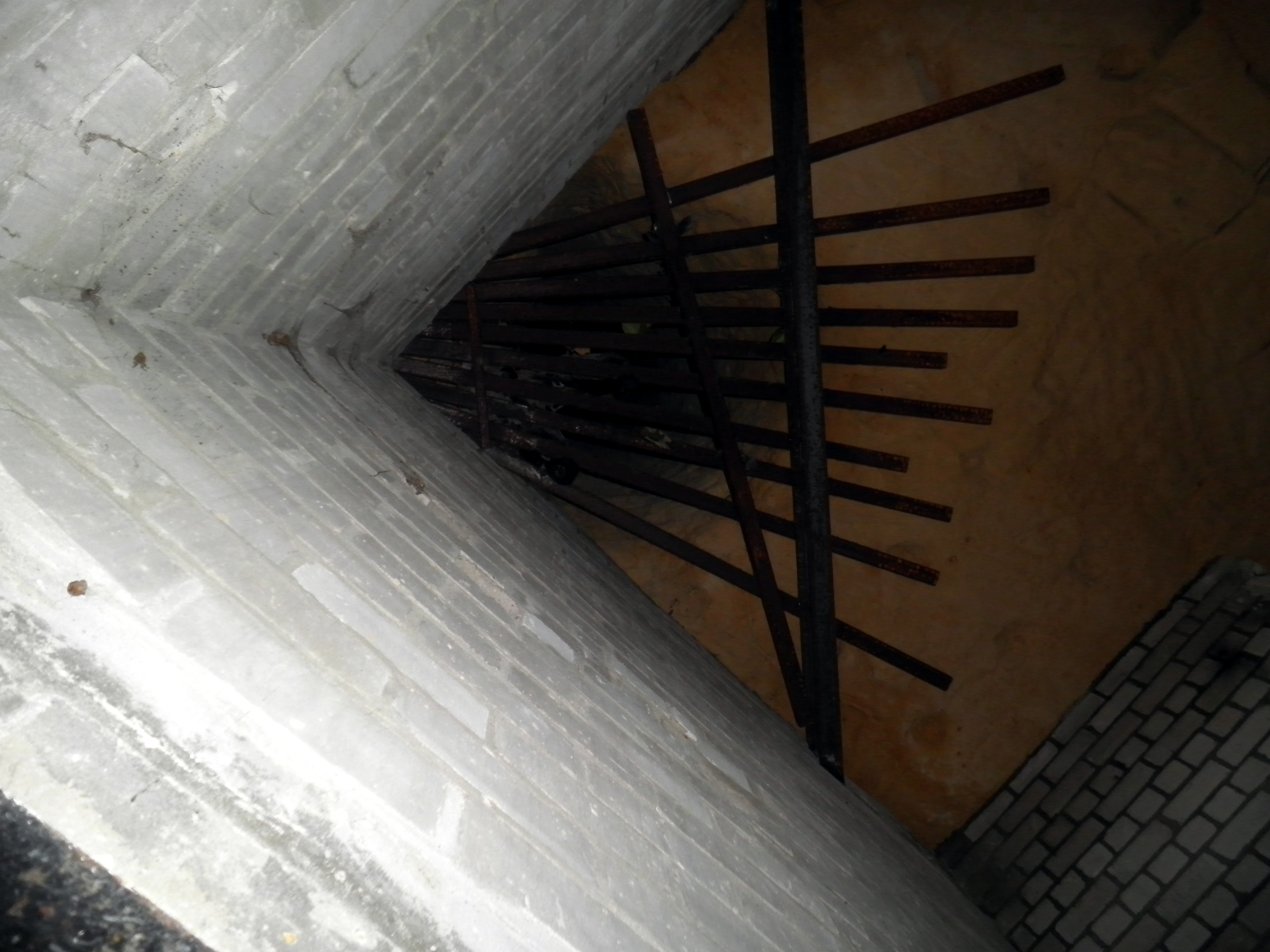
Shaft

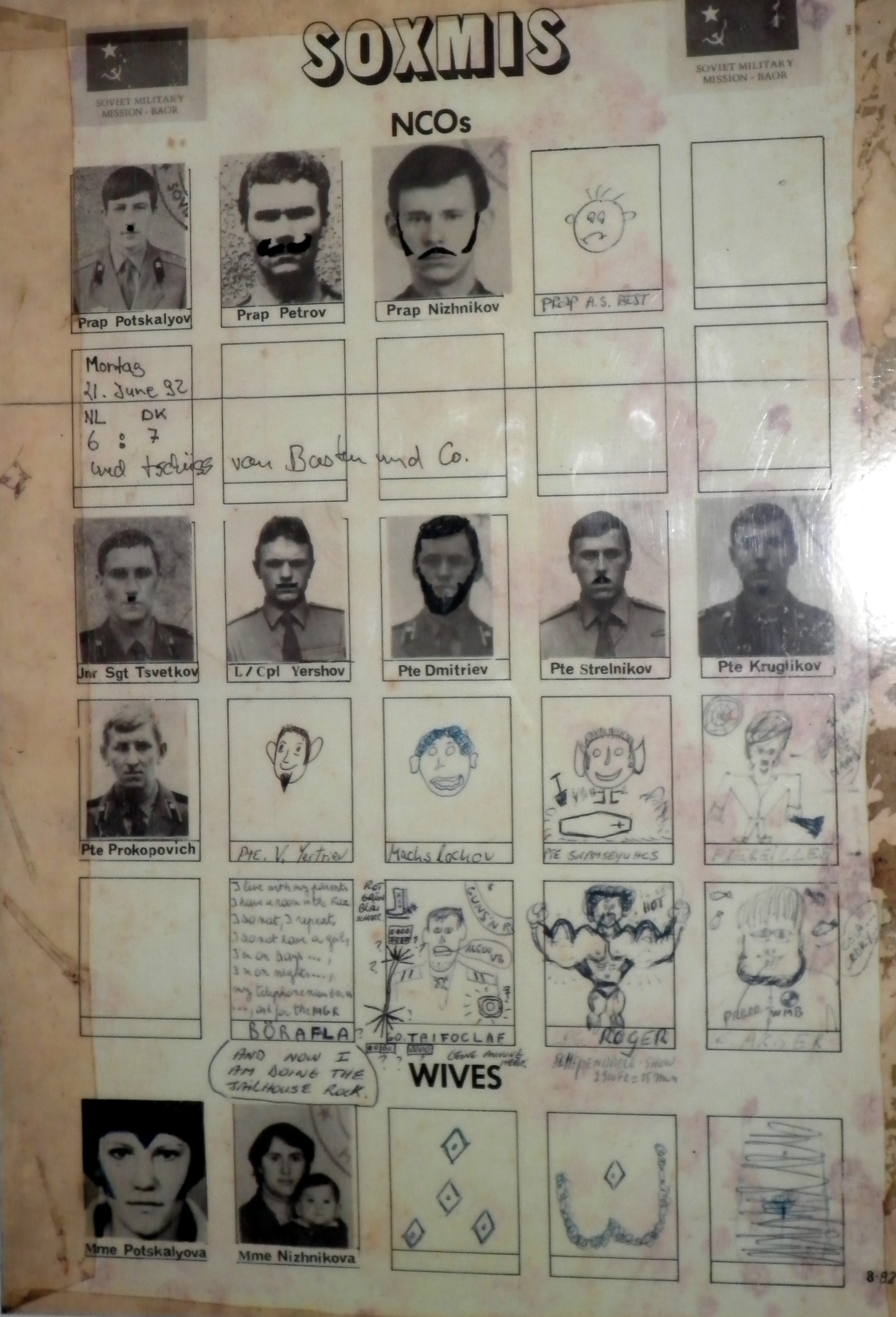
SOXMIS

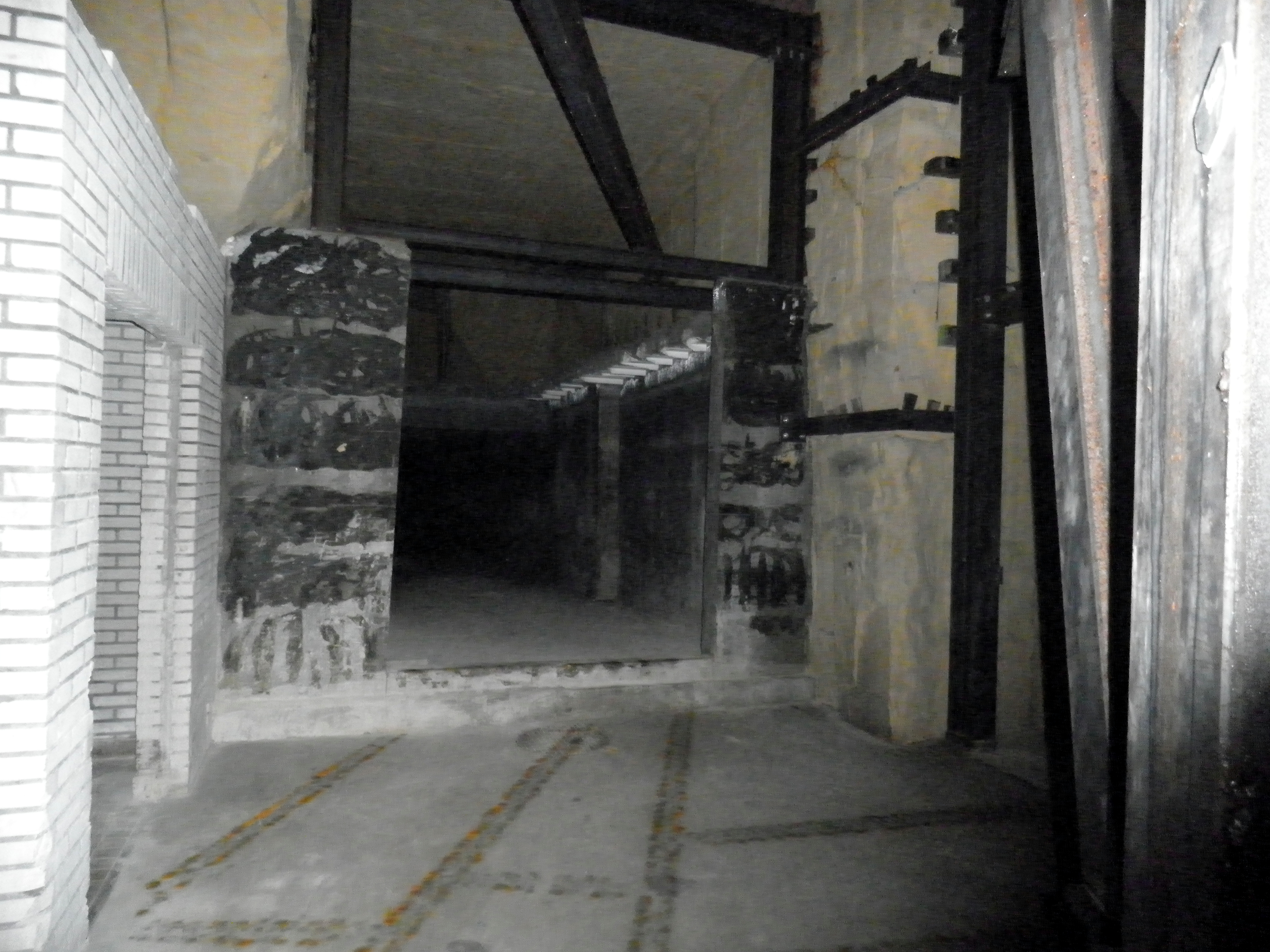
Water reservoir

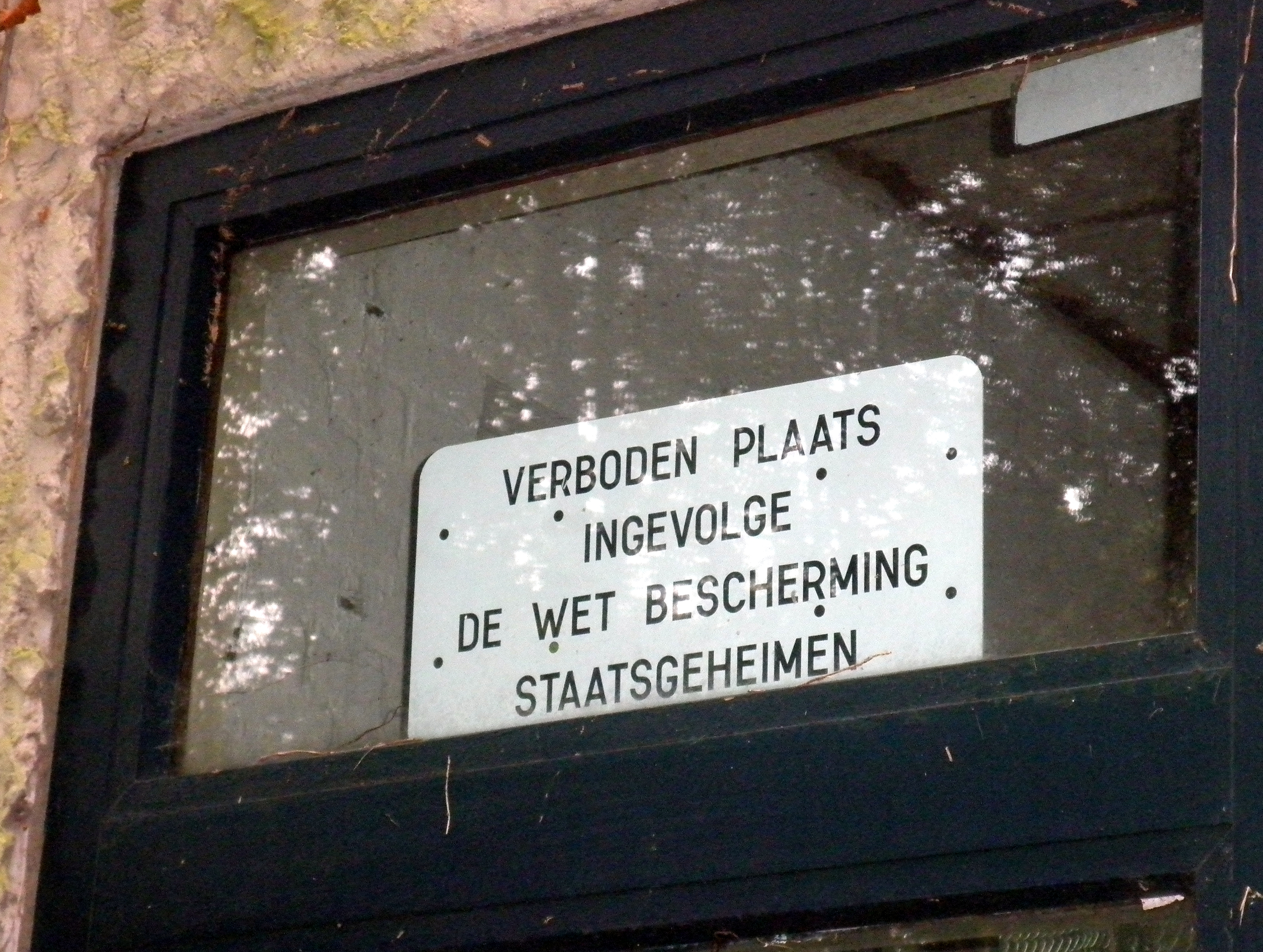
