= Northern Army Group =

Former NATO army group that defended western Germany during the Cold War

- NORTHAG insignia
- Active: 1 November 1952 – 24 June 1993
- Part of: Allied Forces Central Europe
- Headquarters: Rheindahlen

The Northern Army Group (NORTHAG) was a NATO military formation comprising four Western European Army Corps, during the Cold War as part of NATO's forward defence in western Germany.

The Army Group headquarters was established on 1 November 1952 in Bad Oeynhausen, but was relocated in 1954 to Rheindahlen. The HQ complex near Mönchengladbach contained NORTHAG HQ and three other command posts: the headquarters of the Second Allied Tactical Air Force (2 ATAF), British Army of the Rhine (BAOR) and Royal Air Force Germany (RAFG).

Previously, 21st Army Group had been on the left flank of the Allied advance into Germany, and had advanced into the North German Plain. This may have been the reason that a four-corps sized formation - which would usually be considered an army - was given the title of 'Army group'.

== Badge ==
During the construction of the main Joint Headquarters (JHQ) building, a Frankish battle axe (Francisca) was found. It was the badge that NORTHAG chose because the Franks were a West-European tribe fighting against attackers from the East. In the year 451 CE, the Franks defeated an army under the leadership of Attila at Châlons-sur-Marne and thus ended the potential conquest of Western Europe by the Huns.

== Structure ==
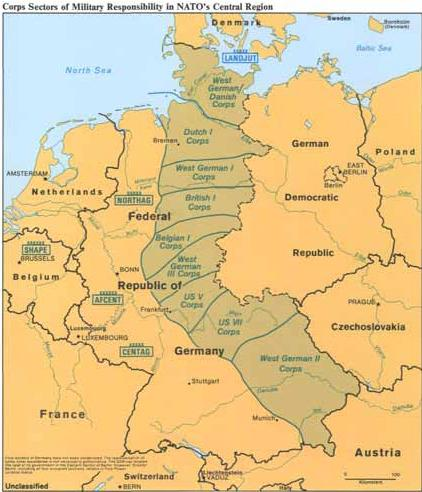
NATO corps sectors in the Central Region

In the NATO command structure NORTHAG belonged to Allied Forces Central Europe (AFCENT), which in turn reported to Supreme Headquarters Allied Powers Europe (SHAPE). NORTHAGs responsibility was the defense of the North German plains from south of the river Elbe to the city of Kassel. The defense north of the Elbe was the task of Allied Land Forces Command Schleswig-Holstein and Jutland (COMLANDJUT), while south of Kassel it was the task of CENTAG.

Commander in Chief of NORTHAG was the commanding General of the British Army of the Rhine (BAOR). Chief of Staff was a German Major General, with a Belgian or Dutch Major General as alternates.

Northern Army Group was assigned the following formations:

- I Dutch Corps
  - 1st Mechanized Division (Dutch),
  - 3rd Panzer Division (West German), from July 1985
  - 4th Mechanized Division (Dutch),
  - 5th Mechanized Division (Dutch),
  - 101st Infantry Brigade (Dutch),
- I German Corps
  - 1st Panzer Division (West German),
  - 7th Panzer Division (West German),
  - 11th Panzergrenadier Division (West German),
  - 27th Airborne Brigade (West German),
- I British Corps - 1980s listing
  - 1st Armoured Division,
  - 2nd Infantry Division
  - 3rd Armoured Division
  - 4th Armoured Division,
- I Belgian Corps
  - 1st Infantry Division
  - 16th Armoured Division

These organizations fell in peacetime under their respective national command authorities. Only in the case of attack did operational control over the Corps automatically transfer to NORTHAG. Air support was provided by 2 ATAF.

During peacetime NORTHAG multi-national staff commanded the following units:

- 13th Belgian Telecommunications Company (13 Cie T Tr)
- 28th Signal Regiment, Royal Signals (NORTHAG)
- German Telecommunications Battalion 840 (NORTHAG)
- Dutch telecommunications company
- NORTHAG telecommunications company (radio NORTHAG Air Support Squadron), which consisted of soldiers from all four nations.

Northag Transport Company, Consisting of an HQ Platoon and four national platoons A British, B Dutch, C Belgium, D German.

In the case of war the headquarters of the 2nd ATAF and NORTHAG would be relocated to the JOC (Joint Operations Center), a bunker complex in the former Cannerberg marl mine in the Maastricht area.

There were two other corps not located on the front lines but associated with NORTHAG. The III French Corps with the 2nd Armoured Division, and 10th Armoured, and 8th Infantry Division began to be more closely associated with the northern part of the Central Front from the late 1970s.

In addition, from the late 1970s the U.S. 3rd Brigade, 2nd Armoured Division was forward deployed at Garlstedt. III (US) Corps was later assigned as a reserve corps. The rest of 2nd Armored Division, along with 1st Cavalry Division, 5th Infantry Division (Mech), 212th Field Artillery Brigade and 3rd Armored Cavalry Regiment were tasked to join NORTHAG through OPERATION REFORGER within days after an outbreak of hostilities. They were to draw their equipment from POMCUS depots in the Netherlands, Belgium and North Rhine-Westphalia. These reinforcements depended upon the air bridge across the Atlantic being opened and the vehicle depots being unharmed or protected from early Soviet action against them.

== Field Operations ==
In the NATO defense plan, NORTHAG was assigned the area between Hamburg and Kassel (North-South) and the German-Dutch, Belgian to the (then) inner-German border to defend against a potential threat from the Warsaw Pact. The locations of NORTHAG forces were accordingly, mostly in this area. In the north the command bordered Allied Forces Northern Europe (AFNORTH) and in the south the Central Army Group (CENTAG).

Under General Sir Nigel Bagnall, NORTHAG tried to reorientate its defensive plans from a static defence to a more mobile approach. By 1986, this plan envisioned the formation of armor-heavy reserves held under army group command.

Ground operations relating to the crisis in former Yugoslavia began in late 1992. In November 1992, the United Nations Protection Force in Bosnia-Herzegovina was provided with an operational headquarters drawn from HQ NORTHAG, including a staff of some 100 personnel, equipment, supplies and initial financial support.

== Disbandment ==
On 24 June 1993, the headquarters of NORTHAG and 2 ATAF officially disbanded during a military ceremony. The last commander of NORTHAG was General Sir Charles Guthrie, KCB LVO OBE. The last Chief of Staff was Major General Helmut Willmann, later commander of the Eurocorps.
