= Static War Headquarters Castlegate =

NATO command bunker in Germany

Coordinates: 50°59′23″N 6°17′43″E

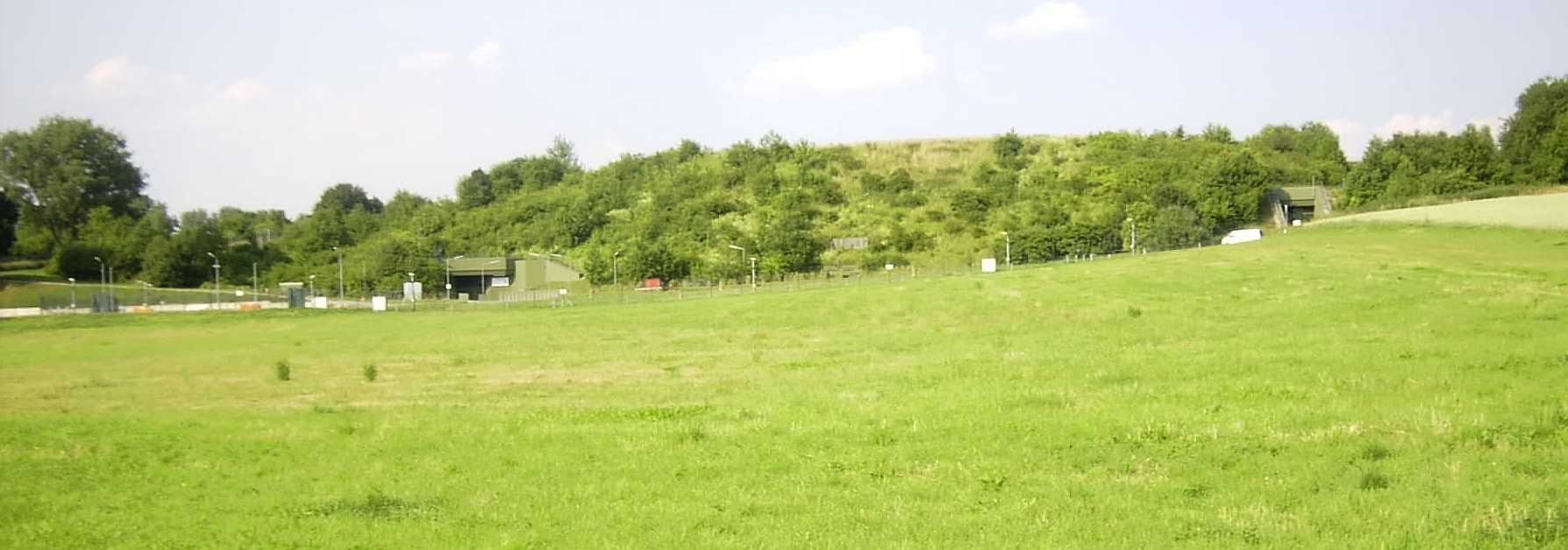
SWHQ Castlegate

Static War Headquarters Castlegate is a NATO command and communications bunker located approximately 2 km north-east of the town of Linnich, Germany. SWHQ Castlegate is operated in caretaker status for NATO by a German military contingent.

== Data ==
The cube-shaped bunker complex covers 14,000 square meters (53 m long and 45 m wide) and has six underground floors (up to 28 meters deep). It offers protection against conventional, biological or chemical attacks, as well as against shock waves and electromagnetic pulses from nearby nuclear weapons . The bunker complex is designed to enable more than 1,000 people to survive independently for several weeks. The construction costs are estimated at around 85 million euros, of which 22.5 million are for the electronic equipment alone.

== History ==
During the Cold War, the bunker was built in 1983 as a command post directly on the southern edge of the Glimbach district on the Moolberg and was intended to accommodate the entire AFNORTH headquarters from Brunssum in the event of war. Today it serves as a crisis and alternative location for the Allied Joint Force Command Brunssum, the successor to AFNORTH. The bunker was originally intended to serve as the headquarters of AFCENT - Allied Forces Central Europe - in the event of war.

The plans for "Castle Gate" date back to the early 1960s, when a "secure castle" for two NATO staffs ( NORTHAG and 2nd ATAF) was designed in Mönchengladbach. Construction began in 1983 and was completed in 1992.

The bunker construction site was the scene of several demonstrations by the peace movement in the 1980s. In 1986, a neighboring "Peace Field" was purchased by a large number of citizens in order to prevent further expansion of the complex. Celebrities and Green Party politicians were involved in the "Peace Field Society" founded for this purpose . Around 1,200 people acquired shares in the Peace Field, including celebrities such as Robert Jungk, Walter Jens, Petra Kelly, Antje Vollmer, Horst Eberhard Richter and the television pastor Jürgen Fliege, who was a Protestant pastor in Aldenhoven at the time.

In the meantime, the military-political situation had changed fundamentally. After a change in the NATO command structure, the bunker initially seemed superfluous and was "on ice" for a long time. It was not until 1998 that the facility was "rediscovered" and its necessity for the NATO command staff in Brunssum was established. The furnishing and installation of the electronic infrastructure followed. Twelve positions for maintenance work were created. Since then, there have been activities again on the outskirts of Linnich-Glimbach, which was the target of many demonstrations by the peace movement in the early 1990s. For example, a peace pagoda was built in the immediate vicinity by Buddhist monks.

On 1 October 2001, the bunker was handed over to NATO and has served as an alternative command post for the Allied Joint Force Command Brunssum since 2004. From 9 to 15 April 2008, the NATO exercise "Conducted Exercise Steadfast Joist 2008" was carried out as part of the CJTF concept.
