= Gerhard Barkhorn =

German general and fighter pilot during World War II (1919–1983)

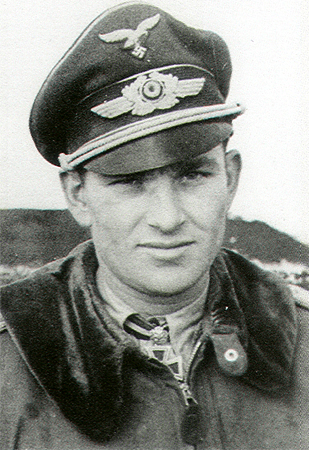
- Barkhorn as a Hauptmann
- Born: 20 March 1919; Königsberg, Prussia, Germany
- Died: 11 January 1983 (aged 63); Frechen/Cologne, West Germany
- Burial place: Tegernsee
- Military career
- Allegiance: Nazi Germany; West Germany
- Branch: Luftwaffe (Wehrmacht); German Air Force (Bundeswehr)
- Service years: 1937–1945; 1956–1975
- Rank: Major (Wehrmacht); Generalmajor (Bundeswehr)
- Nickname: Gerd
- Units: JG 2, JG 52, JG 6 and JV 44
- Commands: 4./JG 52, I./JG 52, II./JG 52, JG 6, JaboG 31 Boelcke
- Conflicts: See battles World War II: Battle of Britain; Eastern Front; Operation Barbarossa; Operation Blue; Operation Citadel; Crimean Offensive (1944); Operation Bagration; Defense of the Reich
- Awards: Knight's Cross of the Iron Cross with Oak Leaves and Swords

Gerhard "Gerd" Barkhorn (20 March 1919 – 11 January 1983) was a German military aviator who was a renowned wing commander in the Luftwaffe during World War II. As a fighter ace, he was the second most successful fighter pilot of all time after fellow German Erich Hartmann. Other than Hartmann, Barkhorn is the only fighter ace to ever exceed 300 claimed victories. Following World War II, he became a high-ranking officer in the German Air Force of the Federal Republic of Germany.

Born in the Weimar Republic in 1919, Barkhorn joined the Luftwaffe in 1937 and completed his training in 1939. Barkhorn flew his first combat missions during the "Phoney War" and then the Battle of Britain without shooting down any aircraft. Flying with Jagdgeschwader 52 (JG 52—52nd Fighter Wing), he claimed his first victory in July 1941 and his total rose steadily against the Soviet Air Forces. In March 1942, Barkhorn was appointed squadron leader of 4. Staffel (4th squadron) of JG 52 and was awarded the Knight's Cross of the Iron Cross in August 1942. He was given command of II. Gruppe (2nd group) of JG 52 in September 1943. Barkhorn was awarded the second highest decoration in the Wehrmacht when he received the Knight's Cross of the Iron Cross with Oak Leaves and Swords for 250 aerial victories.

Barkhorn flew 1,104 combat sorties and was credited with 301 victories on the Eastern Front piloting the Messerschmitt Bf 109. In January 1945, he left JG 52 on the Eastern Front and joined Jagdgeschwader 6 (JG 6—6th Fighter Wing) as Geschwaderkommodore (wing commander), defending Germany from Western Allied air attack. In April 1945, he joined Galland's Jagdverband 44 (JV 44—44th Fighter Detachment) and surrendered to the Western Allies in May 1945 and was released later that year. After the war, Barkhorn joined the German Air Force of the Bundeswehr, serving until 1975. On 6 January 1983, Barkhorn was involved in a car crash with his wife Christl. She died instantly and Barkhorn died five days later on 11 January.

== Early life and career ==
Barkhorn was born on 20 March 1919 in Königsberg in the Free State of Prussia of the Weimar Republic. Today it is Kaliningrad in Kaliningrad Oblast, the Russian exclave between Poland and Lithuania on the Baltic Sea. He was the third of four children of Stadtbauoberinspektor Tiefbautechniker im Straßenbau (inspector for road construction) Wilhelm and his wife Therese. Barkhorn had two brothers, Helmut and Dieter, and a sister Meta. (Note: His sister Meta died of appendicitis during the compulsory Reichsarbeitsdienst (Reich Labour Service). His brother Helmut was killed in action as a Fahnenjunker-Feldwebel on the first days of the Battle of France when his vehicle ran on a land mine. His younger brother Dieter was killed in 1943 as Leutnant and pilot on the Western Front. His father was conscripted into the Volkssturm (people's militia) and went missing in action in the Battle of Königsberg.) The four children were all members of the Bündische Jugend, a German youth movement. From 1925 to 1929, Barkhorn attended the Volksschule (primary school) in Königsberg and then the Wilhelms-Gymnasium, a secondary school, where he graduated with his Abitur (diploma) in early 1937.

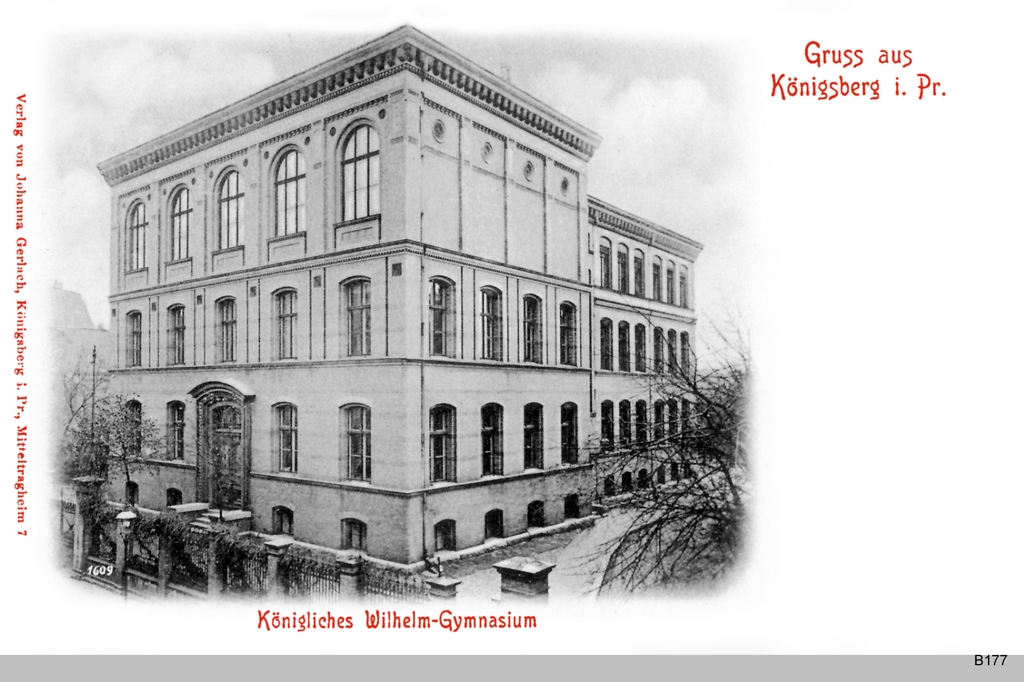
Barkhorn attended the Wilhelms-Gymnasium in Königsberg.

On 1 April 1937, Barkhorn started his compulsory Reichsarbeitsdienst (Reich Labour Service) with Arbeitsdienstabteilung 6/12, a labor service department, in Mehlkehmen, present-day Kalinino in Kaliningrad Oblast. His Reichsarbeitsdienst ended on 30 September. A month later, on 1 November, Barkhorn joined the military service in the Nazi German Luftwaffe as a Fahnenjunker (cadet) at the Air War School Klotzsche in Dresden. He started his flight training in March 1938 at the Luftkriegsschule 2 at Gatow. (Note: Flight training in the Luftwaffe progressed through the levels A1, A2 and B1, B2, referred to as A/B flight training. A training included theoretical and practical training in aerobatics, navigation, long-distance flights and dead-stick landings. The B courses included high-altitude flights, instrument flights, night landings and training to handle the aircraft in difficult situations.) His classmates at Gatow included Julius Meimberg and Egon Mayer. On 4 March, he made his maiden flight on a Heinkel He 72 biplane trainer. Until 25 March, accompanied by his flight instructor, he flew up to nine times daily, flights of up to 60 minutes. His first solo flight, his 68th in total, was flown on 29 March. In April and May, he learned to fly the Focke-Wulf Fw 44 and Bücker Bü 131. On 1 June, he began learning aerobatics on the Gotha Go 145. One of his flight instructors at the time was Franz Stigler who initially thought that Barkhorn was a bad pilot but later graduated him with good ratings.

In December 1938, Barkhorn and the other flight students transferred from Dresden to the airfield at Garz on the island of Usedom. On 6 December, Barkhorn made a crash landing in a Heinkel He 51 biplane fighter and sustained minor injuries. The pilots for the first time flew a mock combat against one of the other pilots in January 1939. In February, the students returned to Dresden where theoretical training was emphasized. Prior to completing his training, Barkhorn was given home leave in the summer. Effective as of 1 August 1939, Barkhorn was promoted to Oberfähnrich (rank equivalent to master sergeant) and at the same time to the officer rank of Leutnant (second lieutenant) on 27 August. His training in Dresden ended that day.

World War II in Europe began on Friday 1 September 1939 when German forces invaded Poland and Barkhorn was selected for specialized fighter pilot training. That day, Barkhorn was posted to the Jagdfliegerschule Schleißheim, the fighter pilot school at Schleißheim. Training began on the He 51, on 10 October, training progressed to the Messerschmitt Bf 108 Taifun single-engine sport and touring aircraft. Barkhorn first flew the Messerschmitt Bf 109 on the morning of 21 October. His first aerial gunnery training was flown on the He 51 on 7 November, scoring 20 out of 100 hits, a relatively poor performance. His next attempt, flown on 16 November was even worse, scoring only 10 out 100 hits on the target. Training in Schleißheim ended on 23 November with an aerial gunnery training on the Bf 109 and a navigation flight on the He 51. On 1 December, he was posted to the Ergänzungs-Jagdgruppe Merseburg, a supplementary training unit based at Merseburg. There, he received further training, particularly in formation flying. He made his last two flights in Merseburg on 7 January 1940, both aerial gunnery training on a Bf 109 B. His last flight was his 615th in total.

== World War II ==
Upon completion of his training, he was posted to 3. Staffel (3rd squadron) in Jagdgeschwader 2 "Richthofen" (JG 2—2nd Fighter Wing), named after the World War I fighter pilot Manfred von Richthofen, on 10 January 1940. At the time, the squadron was based at Frankfurt-Rebstock Airfield and commanded by Hauptmann Henning Strümpell. The squadron was subordinated to I. Gruppe (1st group) of JG 2 headed by Hauptmann Jürgen Roth. (Note: For an explanation of Luftwaffe unit designations see Organisation of the Luftwaffe during World War II.) The Gruppe was equipped with the Bf 109 E and flew combat air patrols along Germany's western border during the "Phoney War" period of World War II. In total, Barkhorn flew on 22 such missions with JG 2.

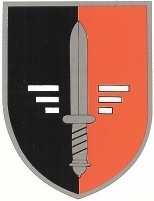
JG 52 Emblem

From 1 April until 30 June, Barkhorn was posted to Fliegerausbildungs-Regiment 10 (10th Aviators Training Regiment) based in Pardubitz, present-day Pardubice in the Czech Republic, as a company commander. In June 1940, Barkhorn fell ill and was diagnosed with scarlet fever. He was sent to a hospital in Wildenschwert, present-day Ústí nad Orlicí in the Czech Republic. By July, he had fully recovered and on 1 July was posted to the 4. Staffel of Jagdgeschwader 52 (JG 52—52nd Fighter Wing), a squadron of II. Gruppe. This squadron was commanded by Oberleutnant Johannes Steinhoff while the Gruppe was led by Hauptmann Horst-Günther von Kornatzki. Barkhorn conducted many training flights with 4. Staffel at Nordholz and Stade. Shortly after 18 August, he was transferred to 6. Staffel. His new Staffelkapitän (squadron leader) was Oberleutnant Werner Lederer. Lederer commanded the Staffel until 6 October when he was transferred and replaced by Oberleutnant Rudolf Resch. Flying from Peuplingues on 27 September, Barkhorn for the first time had enemy contact on a combat air patrol across the English Channel during the Battle of Britain. Near Maidstone and Chatham, the flight encountered Royal Air Force (RAF) fighters. He flew many fighter escort missions to England, including a long-range mission on 29 September for bombers from II. Gruppe of Lehrgeschwader 2 (LG 2—2nd Demonstration Wing) targeting London. On 4 October, he helped escort bombers from I. Gruppe of LG 2, and again on the following day. Barkhorn flew two further missions in support of I. Gruppe of LG 2 on 5 October and three days later, he escorted II. Gruppe of LG 2 and fighter bombers to London. On 10 October, he flew a courier mission, taking documents to Rouen, Beaumont and Cherbourg, before returning to Peuplingues. On 11 and 12 October, Barkhorn flew two further missions to London. On 23 October 1940, for his service he was awarded the Iron Cross 2nd Class (Eisernes Kreuz zweiter Klasse).

On 27 October, Barkhorn flew a further mission, escorting bombers of LG 2 to England. Two days later, on his 38th combat mission, Barkhorn encountered Supermarine Spitfires over the English Channel. His Bf 109 E-7 (Werknummer 5922—factory number) took numerous hits, forcing him to make an emergency landing in the English Channel. Floating in a small inflatable dinghy for two hours, he was rescued by the Seenotdienst, the German air-sea rescue service. Barkhorn flew again on 2 November. This was also the last day of operations for II. Gruppe before it returned to Germany. That day, II. Gruppe had also lost its commanding officer, Hauptmann Wilhelm Ensslen, who had led the Gruppe since 26 August and was killed in action. Ensslen was replaced by Hauptmann Erich Woitke. On 5 November, II. Gruppe moved to München Gladbach, present-day Mönchengladbach, for a period of rest and replenishment. On 3 December 1940, Barkhorn was awarded the Iron Cross 1st Class (Eisernes Kreuz erster Klasse).

On 22 December, II. Gruppe was ordered to Leeuwarden Airfield where they were tasked with flying fighter patrols along the Dutch North Sea coast. On 15 January 1941, the Gruppe moved to Ypenburg Airfield where they stayed until 10 February. Barkhorn's 6. Staffel also used a forward airfield at Haamstede. From this airfield, Barkhorn flew many escort missions for German shipping. On 10 February, II. Gruppe moved to Berck-sur-Mer. From this airfield, the Gruppe again patrolled the English Channel and missions to England. Barkhorn flew two more patrols on 12 February. Three days later, he participated on a mission to Dover-Dungeness. On 6 March, II. Gruppe was ordered to Maldegem, where they were joined by Walter Krupinski, someone Barkhorn had befriended during training, having completed his training with the Ergänzungsgruppe. Until 24 March, Barkhorn flew further combat air patrols, mostly in the area of Ostend to Calais followed by a shipping escort mission on 27 March. On 15 April, the Gruppe moved again, this time to Raversijde. On 27 April, II. Gruppe was ordered to an airfield near Katwijk aan Zee, west-northwest of Leiden, where they received the new Bf 109 F variant. On 24 May, the Gruppe returned again to Raversijde. During this time, Barkhorn flew many training and patrol missions on the Bf 109 F-2 until 20 April when he received the Front Flying Clasp of the Luftwaffe in Silver (Frontflugspange in Silber). II. Gruppe was withdrawn from the Channel on 9 June and headed east.

=== Operation Barbarossa ===
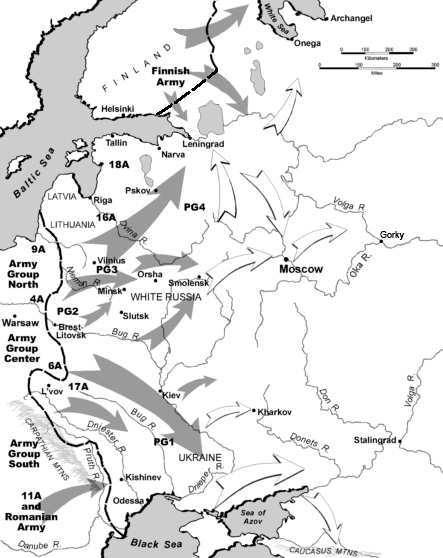
Map indicating Operation Barbarossa's attack plan

In preparation of Operation Barbarossa, the German invasion of the Soviet Union, II. Gruppe of JG 52, without a period of replenishment in Germany, was ordered to airfields close to the German-Soviet demarcation line. While the Gruppenstab (group headquarters unit) and 4. Staffel were based at Suwałki in northeastern Poland, 5. and 6. Staffel were transferred to a forward airfield at Sobolewo. For the invasion, II. Gruppe of JG 52 was subordinated to the Geschwaderstab (headquarters unit) of Jagdgeschwader 27 (JG 27—27th Fighter Wing). The Geschwader was part of the VIII. Fliegerkorps commanded by Generaloberst Wolfram Freiherr von Richthofen which supported the northern wing of Army Group Centre.

On 22 June, the German forces launched the attack on the Soviet Union which opened the Eastern Front. That day, Barkhorn flew five combat missions in support of the invasion. On his third mission, he was credited with a ground victory over a Polikarpov I-15 fighter aircraft during a strafing attack on a Soviet airfield. Barkhorn claimed his first aerial victory by shooting down a Red Air Force Ilyushin DB-3 bomber on 2 July, flying his 120th combat sortie. That day, II. Gruppe claimed 19 aerial victories in combat near Barysaw. The next day, II. Gruppe moved further east to an airfield at Sloboda, east of Minsk where they stayed for two days. The Gruppe then moved to Lyepyel where they supported Panzergruppe 2 and 3 in their advance to Vitebsk and Polotsk. On 12 July, the Gruppe moved to Kamary, an airfield in the western parts of Vitebsk. Barkhorn flew many combat missions during this period without claiming a further aerial victory. On 16 July, he was tasked with shuttling a Bf 109 back to Werneuchen in Germany for repairs, a task normally given to junior pilots. Ten days later, he returned to the Eastern Front. By this time, II. Gruppe had advanced to Andrejewka airfield near Smolensk. On 28 July, Barkhorn claimed his second aerial victory over a Polikarpov I-16 fighter. The following day, he was credited with the destruction of a DB-3 bomber, his third aerial victory.

On 5 August, II. Gruppe was ordered to relocate to Soltsy, west of Lake Ilmen, in support of the 16th Army and Army Group North. In the following days, Barkhorn flew many ground support, combat air patrols and Junkers Ju 87 dive bomber escort missions to the combat area near Shimsk and Veliky Novgorod. He claimed the destruction of an I-18 fighter, an early German designation for a Mikoyan-Gurevich MiG-1 fighter, on 19 August. The next day, II. Gruppe was ordered to an airfield at Spasskaya Polist, south of Chudovo and north of Lake Ilmen. Two days later, Barkhorn escorted a Focke-Wulf Fw 189 aerial reconnaissance aircraft to Chudovo on his first mission of the day. On his second mission that day, he claimed a Vultee V-11 attack aircraft, but the victim was actually an Ilyushin Il-2 attack aircraft. On 25 August, Barkhorn was credited with two aerial victories, a Polikarpov I-153 fighter on his first mission of the day and later an I-18 fighter. On 27 August, Barkhorn's Front Flying Clasp was upgraded to Gold (Frontflugspange in Gold).

On 2 September, II. Gruppe moved to Lyuban, staying there until the end of September. From there, the Gruppe flew missions against Shlisselburg, Mga and Leningrad. II. Gruppe's subordination to JG 27 ended on 20 October and they came under the command of the Stab of JG 52. Barkhorn was promoted to Oberleutnant (first lieutenant) on 1 November 1941. He claimed his tenth and last aerial victory in 1941 on a meteorological reconnaissance mission (Wetterflug) over an I-61, an early German designation for a Mikoyan-Gurevich MiG-3 fighter, on 30 November.

On 24 January 1942, having been withdrawn from the Eastern Front, II. Gruppe arrived in Jesau near Königsberg, present-day Kaliningrad in Russia, for a period of recuperation and replenishment. In Jesau, the Gruppe received many factory new Bf 109 F-4 aircraft. On 14 April, II. Gruppe received orders to move to Pilsen, present-day Plzeň in the Czech Republic, for relocation to the Eastern Front.

=== Squadron leader ===
While II. Gruppe was based at Jesau, Barkhorn was appointed Staffelkapitän of 4. Staffel of JG 52 on 1 March 1942. He succeeded Steinhoff in this capacity who had been given command of II. Gruppe of JG 52. The unit then moved to Wien-Schwechat on 24 April before flying to Zürichtal, present-day Solote Pole, a village near the urban settlement of Kirovske in the Crimea. There, II. Gruppe participated in Operation Trappenjagd, a German counterattack during the Battle of the Kerch Peninsula, launched on 8 May. On 16 May, II. Gruppe relocated to Artyomovsk, present-day Bakhmut, where JG 52 supported the German forces fighting in the Second Battle of Kharkov.

On 22 June, German forces launched Operation Fridericus II, the attack on Kupiansk, a preliminary operation to Case Blue, the strategic summer offensive in southern Russia. That day, Barkhorn for the first time became "ace-in-a-day", claiming five Lavochkin-Gorbunov-Gudkov LaGG-3 fighters shot down, taking his total to 26 aerial victories. Barkhorn again became an "ace-in-a-day" on 19 July, flying four missions that day, he shot down six Soviet fighters taking his total to 51 aerial victories. His claims that day include two Hawker Hurricanes, three LaGG-3s and an I-16 shot down. The following day, he increased his total number of aerial victories to 56, again an "ace-in-a-day" achievement. With Leutnant Waldemar Semelka as his wingman, Barkhorn shot down five LaGG-3 fighters.

On 22 July, II. Gruppe moved to an airfield named Nowy Cholan, approximately 200 kilometers (120 miles) northeast of Rostov-on-Don. On 24 July, Barkhorn transferred to an airfield named Nikolajewskaja, approximately 15 minutes flying time closer to front lines. During this day, Barkhorn claimed three further aerial victories, increasing his total to 64. The following day, he flew on an escort mission for a Fieseler Fi 156 Storch heading for the front lines. His Bf 109 F-4/R1 (Werknummer 13388—factory number) took a hit from anti-aircraft artillery, resulting in a forced landing near Morosow. Despite the aircraft sustaining only minor damage, Barkhorn suffered a severe injury to his lower leg and had to be evacuated by air. He was taken to a makeshift hospital installed at the Olympiapark Berlin. During his convalescence, Barkhorn was temporarily replaced by Semelka who was killed in action on 21 August. Command was then given to Leutnant Otto Leicher who was also killed in action. In consequence, Krupinski was transferred from 6. Staffel, taking command of 4. Staffel on 10 September. In July 1942, Barkhorn had destroyed 30 Soviet aircraft. While hospitalized, on 21 August 1942, he was awarded the German Cross in Gold (Deutsches Kreuz in Gold) and two days later the Knight's Cross of the Iron Cross (Ritterkreuz des Eisernen Kreuzes).

In late September, following his convalescence, Barkhorn returned to his 4. Staffel. By this time II. Gruppe, having made several relocations, had been based at Maykop since 21 September. On 2 October, he logged his first brief maintenance flight after returning to the front. On 7 October, Barkhorn, with Unteroffizier Werner Quast as his wingman, claimed a LaGG-3 fighter shot down north of Tuapse. Later that day, he claimed three further LaGG-3 fighters destroyed. On 19 December 1942, Barkhorn had raised his score to 101 victories. That day, he became the 32nd Luftwaffe pilot to achieve the century mark. Barkhorn came to respect the Soviet pilots. On one occasion he was involved in a forty-minute dogfight with a LaGG-3. "Sweat was pouring off me just as though I had stepped out of the shower", he recalled: despite having a faster aircraft he was simply unable to get a bead on the Russian pilot.

On 9 January 1943, Barkhorn claimed his 105th aerial victory. His victims included Lieutenant Vasiliyev, and Hero of the Soviet Union Podpolkovnik Lev Shestakov of the 236 IAP (Istrebitelny Aviatsionny Polk—Истребительный Авиационный Полк or Fighter Aviation Regiment) Barkhorn hit their Yakovlev Yak-1 fighters until they caught fire. Both pilots survived. On 11 January 1943, Barkhorn was awarded the Knight's Cross of the Iron Cross with Oak Leaves (Ritterkreuz des Eisernen Kreuzes mit Eichenlaub). Barkhorn claimed his 120th aerial victory on 27 February, four days later he went on home leave. During his vacation, he was presented the Oak Leaves to his Knight's Cross and married his fiancé, Christine Tischer, also known as Christl, in Tegernsee. The marriage produced three daughters, Ursula born 1943, Eva born 1945 and Dorothea born 1954. During his leave, Barkhorn was promoted to Hauptmann (captain) on 1 April.

Barkhorn returned to his unit on 23 April. At the time, II. Gruppe was based at Anapa located on the northern coast of the Black Sea near the Sea of Azov and was fighting in the Battle of the Caucasus. During his absence, Steinhoff as commander of II. Gruppe had been replaced by Hauptmann Helmut Kühle. On 28 April, Barkhorn claimed his 121st aerial victory, a LaGG-3 fighter. Barkhorn's 157 aerial victory, claimed on 23 August, was also II. Gruppe's 2,000th aerial victory in total. From 4 to 30 August, Barkhorn temporarily led I. Gruppe of JG 52. The acting commander of I. Gruppe, Hauptmann Johannes Wiese had fallen ill on 1 August and needed to be replaced during his recovery.

=== Group commander ===
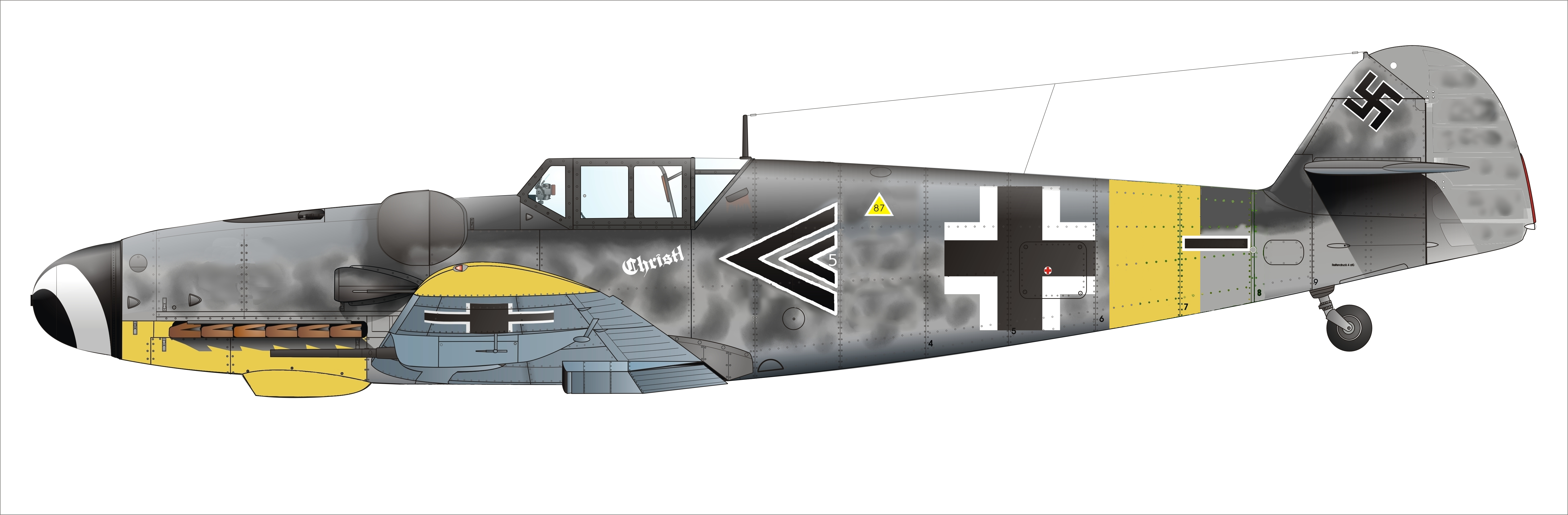
Barkhorn's Messerschmitt Bf 109 G-6 of Stab II./JG 52, November 1943

Barkhorn was appointed Gruppenkommandeur (group commander) of II. Gruppe of JG 52 on 1 September 1943. He replaced Kühle who was transferred. Command of 4. Staffel was passed on to Leutnant Heinrich Sturm. On 5 September, he shot down Hero of the Soviet Union and Soviet fighter pilot Nikolay Klepikov, an ace with 10 personal and 32 shared victories. These two Lavochkin La-5s shot down by Barkhorn were his 165th and 166th aerial victories. This was offset by the loss of II. Gruppe's 173-victory ace Oberleutnant Heinz Schmidt. Barkhorn reached the 200 mark on 30 November 1943. This achievement earned him a named reference in the Wehrmachtbericht on 2 December. That day, he also became an "ace-in-a-day" for the fourth time in combat near Tuzla Island. On 28 December, he yet again became an "ace-in-a-day", taking his total number of aerial victories to 222. The following day, he claimed II. Gruppe's 2,500th aerial victory in total. On 23 January 1944, Barkhorn became the first German pilot to fly 1,000 combat missions. At the time, Barkhorn's regular wingman was Heinz Ewald.

The main German fighter unit covering the Crimea and Kuban was his II. Group of JG 52 and in the three months between December 1943 and 13 February 1944 the unit claimed 350 victories, of which 50 were claimed by Barkhorn personally. On 13 February 1944, he reached 250 aerial victories. (Note: According to Mathews and Foreman claimed on 12 February 1944.) Barkhorn was the third pilot to reach this total, earning him a second named reference in the Wehrmachtbericht on 14 February. For several days, Barkhorn was grounded and did not fly any further combat missions. He claimed his next aerial victory on 25 February over a Petlyakov Pe-2 bomber.

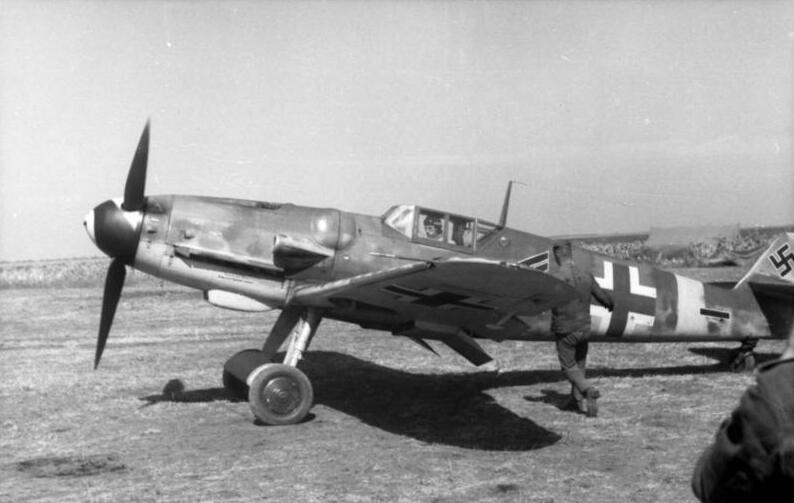
Barkhorn in the cockpit of a Bf 109, at Anapa, autumn 1943.

On 2 March 1944, he was awarded the Knight's Cross of the Iron Cross with Oak Leaves and Swords (Ritterkreuz des Eisernen Kreuzes mit Eichenlaub und Schwertern). The presentation of the Swords was made at the Führerhauptquartier (Führer Headquarter) on 24 March. Barkhorn took an overnight train to the Führerhauptquartier from the Anhalter Bahnhof in Berlin. On the train he met fellow JG 52 pilots Krupinski, Wiese and Hartmann, who were to receive the Oak Leaves to the Knight's Cross. At the Führerhauptquartier they joined Kurt Bühligen, Horst Ademeit, Reinhard Seiler, Hans-Joachim Jabs, Dr. Maximilian Otte, Bernhard Jope and Hansgeorg Bätcher from the bomber force, and the Flak officer Fritz Petersen, all destined to receive the Oak Leaves. The travelers assumed that they were heading for the Wolf's Lair in East Prussia but the train was heading for the Berghof in Berchtesgaden. On the train, all of them got drunk on cognac and champagne. Supporting each other and unable to stand, they arrived at Berchtesgaden. Major Nicolaus von Below, Hitler's Luftwaffe adjutant, was shocked. After some sobering up, they were still intoxicated. Hartmann took a German officer's hat from a stand and put it on, but it was too large. Von Below became upset, told Hartmann it was Hitler's and ordered him to put it back. Barkhorn was sent on a propaganda tour in Germany, visited Jagdgeschwader 11 (JG 11—11th Fighter Wing) at Wunstorf Airfield and was promoted to Major (major) on 1 April 1944. He returned to his II. Gruppe in late April, which was then based at Chersonesus at Sevastopol.

Barkhorn was credited with shooting down three Yakovlev Yak-7 fighters on 26 April, a further Yak-7 the following day, and again three Yak-7 fighters on 28 April. Barkhorn thus surpassed Walter Nowotny who at the time was credited with 256 aerial victories. On 25 May, Barkhorn was ordered to transfer one Staffel to the west in Defense of the Reich. Barkhorn selected Leutnant Hans Waldmann's 4. Staffel which was officially assigned to the II. Gruppe of Jagdgeschwader 3 "Udet" (JG 3—3rd Fighter Wing), at the time under the command of Hauptmann Hans-Ekkehard Bob, and later by Hauptmann Herbert Kutscha. Two days later, II. Gruppe was moved to Huși. On 30 May, Barkhorn was credited with shooting down two Bell P-39 Airacobra fighters. The following day, he claimed his 273rd aerial victory and was shot down by Soviet fighters and hospitalized for four months. On that day, Barkhorn was escorting Ju 87 dive bombers from III. Gruppe of Schlachtgeschwader 2 (SG 2—2nd Ground Attack Wing) headed by Major Hans-Ulrich Rudel on a ground support mission to the combat area at the Prut. Barkhorn claimed two P-39 fighters, an Il-2 ground attack aircraft and a Yak-9 fighter. He was then shot down in his Bf 109 G-6 (Werknummer 163195) by a P-39 fighter. Severely wounded in his right arm and leg, he made a forced landing near Iași. It had been his sixth mission of the day and he was attacking Soviet bombers when he was attacked from behind. Following immediate treatment at a field hospital in Huși, he was evacuated to Bad Wiessee for convalescence. With Barkhorn sidelined, Hartmann surpassed his total, taking his total to 301 aerial victories. Following this achievement, Hartmann was sent on home leave and married at Bad Wiessee on 10 September. Barkhorn, who was still recovering in Bad Wiessee at the time, attended the wedding and became Hartmann's best man.

During his convalescence, Barkhorn had temporarily been replaced by Hauptmann Helmut Lipfert until September, and by Hauptmann Heinrich Sturm until Barkhorn's return to II. Gruppe in October. Returning to his unit, the psychological damage and combat stress on Barkhorn became apparent; sitting in his cockpit he became overcome with anxiety, and even when flying with friendly aircraft behind him he felt intense fear. It took several weeks for him to overcome this condition. Barkhorn claimed his 275th victory on 14 November. Over the next few weeks Barkhorn added another 26 victories, scoring his 301st and final aerial victory on 5 January 1945.

=== Defense of the Reich ===
On 1 January 1945, the Luftwaffe launched Operation Bodenplatte, a failed attempt to gain air superiority during the stagnant stage of the Battle of the Bulge. In this attack, Jagdgeschwader 6 (JG 6—6th Fighter Wing) lost its Geschwaderkommodore (wing commander), Oberstleutnant Johann Kogler, who was taken prisoner of war. Following Operation Bodenplatte, JG 6 relocated from the Western Front to the Eastern Front where it was based at Tschenstochau, present-day Częstochowa in southern Poland. On or near 23 January, Barkhorn took command of JG 6, the Geschwaderstab had just moved from Schroda, present-day Środa Wielkopolska, to Sorau, present-day Żary. At the time, the Geschwaderstab was equipped with the Focke-Wulf Fw 190 A-8 and A-9. While the three groups of JG 6 were equipped with the Bf 109 G-14 and the Fw 190 A, the Geschwaderstab was equipped with Fw 190 D-9 in February.

Barkhorn led this unit until the end-March 1945. During his ten weeks tenure as Geschwaderkommodore of JG 6, he did not claim any aerial victories. He had difficulties adjusting to the Fw 190 D-9. He later stated that he would have needed 50 more flights to master the aircraft. It is unclear whether Barkhorn flew the Fw 190 D-9 in combat. Nevertheless, on 11 February, he was presented the Front Flying Clasp of the Luftwaffe in Gold with Pennant "1,100" (Frontflugspange in Gold mit Anhänger "1,100"). Shortly after 23 March, Barkhorn was relieved of command. His wingman later stated that Barkhorn was forced to leave for medical reasons. At the time he was suffering from severe physical and mental strain after four years of combat.

Following the dismissal of Generalleutnant Adolf Galland as General der Jagdflieger (Inspector of Fighters), Galland was given the opportunity by Hitler to prove his ideas about the Messerschmitt Me 262 jet fighter. He had hoped that the Me 262 would compensate for the numerical superiority of the Allies. In consequence, Galland formed Jagdverband 44 (JV 44—44th Fighter Detachment) at Brandenburg-Briest on 24 February 1945. Galland was also given carte blanche with respect to staffing and began recruiting his pilots. On 31 March, JV 44 had relocated to Munich-Riem. Galland and Steinhoff, who had also joined JV 44, drove to Bad Wiessee where Barkhorn and Krupinski were recovering. Both pilots accepted Galland's offer and joined JV 44. Barkhorn found flying the Me 262 over the western front difficult and he did not score any victories in it. On 21 April 1945, he flew his 1,104th and last mission. One of the engines of his aircraft flamed out as he was approaching an enemy bomber formation and he was forced to make an emergency landing. As he approached the airfield, his jet was attacked by several prowling North American P-51 Mustang fighters. Barkhorn managed to land his burning plane though he received a slight wound as a result of this action when the cockpit canopy – which on the Me 262 A, flipped open to starboard, like a Bf 109's did – prior to crash landing, slammed shut on his neck. On 4 May, JV 44 surrendered to U.S. forces at Maxglan, near Salzburg. Barkhorn and other pilots were taken to a makeshift prisoner of war camp near Bad Aibling. Five days later, a U.S. officer was looking for JV 44 pilots and Barkhorn, Krupinski, Karl-Heinz Schnell, Erich Hohagen and Waldemar Wübke stepped up. The men were then taken to Heidelberg, Wiesbaden-Erbenheim and flown to England for interrogation near London. In June, Barkhorn was taken to Southampton and then with a ship to Cherbourg where he was interned in a prisoner of war camp near Foucarville.

== Later life and service ==
Barkhorn was released as a prisoner of war on 3 September 1945. He then returned to Tegernsee to be reunited with his family. There, he was also joined by his mother who had managed to escape from Königsberg. In October, Barkhorn's first employment as an auxiliary worker was with Linhof, a manufacturer of cameras, based in Munich. A year later, he found employment in Grünwald. His employment there ended in 1949. Following a brief period of unemployment, he took a course at Volkswagen in November 1949. In December, he was hired by Auto Junk, a Volkswagen dealership in Trier, at first as head of technical field services. Four years later, Barkhorn was promoted to head of facility and service management.

=== With the German Air Force ===
Following the decision of the Cabinet of Germany to rearm the Federal Republic of Germany, Barkhorn was approached by the Federal Ministry of Defense in late 1955. He accepted the offer, and on 2 January 1956 joined the newly created German Air Force, at the time referred to as the Bundesluftwaffe. On 19 June 1956, Barkhorn was again promoted to the rank of Major, then followed by his oath of allegiance. The first three Bundesluftwaffe pilots to receive jet aircraft training were Steinhoff, Barkhorn's former squadron commander during World War II, Dietrich Hrabak and Kurt Kuhlmey. All three of them were trained by the United States Air Force (USAF) in the USA. Barkhorn, along with Krupinski and Herbert Wehnelt, belonged to the second batch of pilots which were sent to England and were trained by the RAF. At first, Ralph von Rettberg had been considered for training in England. Von Rettberg reconsidered and Krupinski then suggested to give the now vacant training position to Günther Rall. Rall however was already scheduled for a training in the U.S.. In consequence, the vacant training position was given to Barkhorn.

JaboG 31 Emblem

The three pilots were welcomed by the German ambassador in the UK, Hans von Herwarth. Training began at RAF Feltwell on 19 January 1956 on the Percival Provost, a propeller driven trainer aircraft. The pilots completed their refresher training on 23 March. Barkhorn then advanced to the de Havilland Vampire jet aircraft. Barkhorn, Krupinski and Wehnelt completed this training in May 1956. In June, the pilots trained on the Hawker Hunter for ten weeks. On 18 June 1956, Barkhorn, Krupinski and Wehnelt received the RAF aircrew brevet from Air Vice-Marshal George Philip Chamberlain in Stanford Park. Following his return to Germany, Barkhorn was appointed squadron leader of 1. Staffel of the Waffenschule der Luftwaffe 30 (WaSLw 30—Air Force Weapons School 30). Based at Fürstenfeldbruck Air Base, the training unit was commanded by Krupinski and later became the Jagdbombergeschwader 33 (JaboG 33—Fighter-Bomber Wing 33). On 1 July 1957, Barkhorn succeeded Krupinski as commander of the weapons school which was then moved to Büchel Air Base. From 1 April 1957 to 31 December 1962, he commanded the Jagdbombergeschwader 31 "Boelcke" (JaboG 31—Fighter-Bomber Wing 31), initially equipped with the Republic F-84F Thunderstreak. During this timeframe, Barkhorn was promoted to Oberstleutnant (lieutenant colonel) on 28 April 1958, effective as of 12 May 1958. Because Barkhorn had been separated from his family for more than two years, he requested to be transferred to a position located in southern Germany on 13 October 1958. This request was denied. On 28 September 1960, Barkhorn was promoted to Oberst (colonel). In May and June 1961, Barkhorn attended the 4. Staffel of the Waffenschule der Luftwaffe 10 (WaSLw 10—Air Force Weapons School 10) at Oldenburg Air Base. There, he was trained to fly the Lockheed F-104 Starfighter. In 1962, JaboG 31, under the command of Barkhorn, was the first unit to complete transition to the fighter bomber F-104 G. This event was to be celebrated at the Nörvenich Air Base on 20 June 1962. The day before, the aerobatics team of the Bundesluftwaffe, led by their flight instructor Captain Jon Speer from the USAF, practiced the diamond formation for the celebration. Flying too fast and too low, the four F-104 F Starfighters crashed near Balkhausen, present-day part of Kerpen. The pilots Speer, Bernd Kuebart (brother of Jörg Kuebart), Wolf von Stürmer and Hein Frye were all killed in the accident. The diamond formation was forbidden after the accident. Despite the order, Barkhorn had found out that other pilots of JaboG 31 had also practiced this formation flying their F-104 G fighter bombers. On 1 January 1963, Barkhorn was transferred to the Führungsstab der Luftwaffe (German Air Staff), a department of the Federal Ministry of Defense.

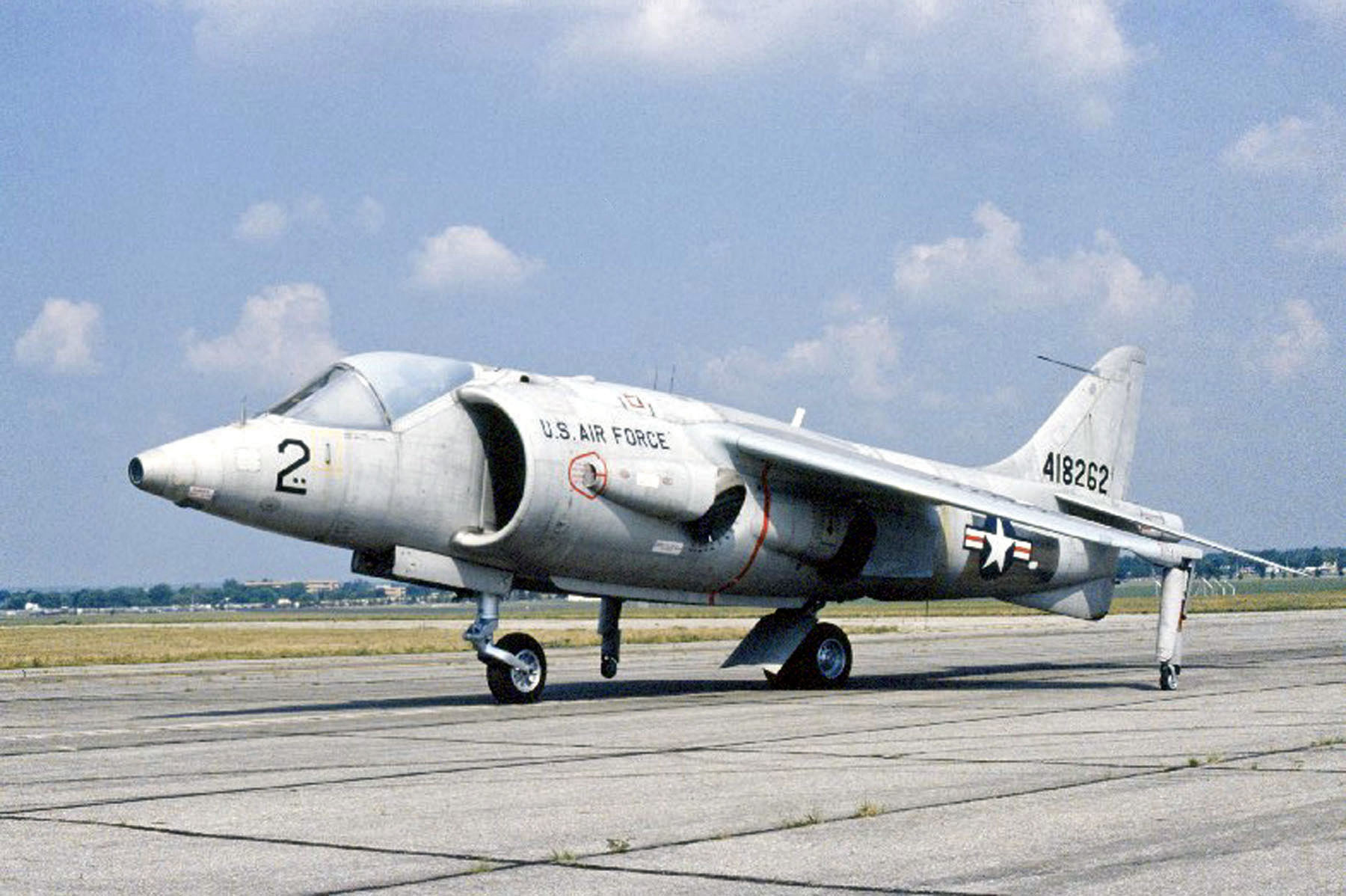
Hawker Siddeley XV-6A Kestrel in USAF livery

In 1964, Barkhorn was posted to the staff of Luftwaffen-Erprobungskommando (Air Force Test Command). From October 1964 until November 1965, Barkhorn headed the six-man Bundesluftwaffe contingent of the Tripartite Kestrel Evaluation Squadron at RAF West Raynham, Norfolk, England. The squadron's mission was to evaluate the military capabilities of the V/STOL Kestrel FGA.1, the development version of the Hawker Siddeley P.1127 and forerunner of the Hawker Siddeley Harrier V/STOL aircraft. The squadron consisted of military test pilots and ground staff from three nations: Britain, USA and West Germany. In addition to being one of the squadron pilots, Barkhorn also served as one of the squadron's two deputy commanders. During one mission on 13 October 1963, he crash-landed a Kestrel FGA.1 (serial XS689) at RAF West Raynham, when he apparently cut thrust one meter above ground, wiping out the undercarriage. A Luftwaffe Experte with 301 aerial victories, he is said to have commented, "Drei hundert und zwei [302]!" as he was helped from the jet. At the conclusion of the evaluation, Barkhorn then accompanied the American contingent to the U.S., where he assisted in that nation's continuing trials of six of the Kestrels (the West German and US aircraft) that had been shipped to the U.S. and designated the XV-6A for tri-service evaluation.

In April 1968, Barkhorn became a member of the Air Force Staff. He was then transferred to the Fourth Allied Tactical Air Force (4 ATAF) and the Allied Forces Baltic Approaches (AIRBALTAP) at the headquarters in Karup, Denmark. On 10 September 1969, with the permission of the President of Germany, he was given the temporary rank of Brigadegeneral (brigadier general), the official promotion followed on 14 May 1970, effective as of 1 April. In February 1972, Barkhorn was informed that his assignment to AIRBALTAP would have to be extended until 1 October 1973 because there were no vacant positions for a Brigadegeneral in Germany at the time. As of 1970, the first generation senior Bundesluftwaffe officers started going into retirement. Steinhoff, who had advanced in career to Inspector of the Air Force, had defined a small group of second generation leaders, among them Krupinski, Rall, Gerhard Limberg and Friedrich Obleser. At first, Barkhorn was also a member of this inner circle. However, Rall, who succeeded Steinhoff as Inspector of the Air Force in 1971, attested that Barkhorn lacked the toughness and ability to work under pressure required for a higher command position in the Bundesluftwaffe.

In early 1973, Rall had promised Barkhorn command of the 1st Luftwaffe Division, an offer that was later withdrawn. Following his assignment to AIRBALTAP, Barkhorn was promoted to Generalmajor (major general) on 1 October 1973. Barkhorn, whose aspiration for a higher command position in the Bundesluftwaffe was unfulfilled, asked to be released from active service in early 1974. This request was initially refused until in February 1975 his retirement process was initiated. On 16 April 1975, he requested that the authorities spare him from a personal handout of his retirement papers. His last position was Chief of Staff of the Second Allied Tactical Air Force (2 ATAF), a NATO military formation under Allied Air Forces Central Europe based in Ramstein Air Base. He retired from active service on 30 September 1975.

=== Accident and death ===
On 6 January 1983, Barkhorn was driving his wife Christl and their friend Reichsfreiherr Walter von Loë on a wintry highway close to the interchange Frechen, near Cologne, when they were involved in a serious car accident which was not Barkhorn's fault. Christl was thrown from the vehicle and killed instantly, while Barkhorn and von Loë were taken to a nearby hospital. Although Barkhorn had sustained severe internal injuries, he was still conscious when he arrived at the hospital. He asked the doctor about his wife, and learned that she had not survived the accident. Shortly afterwards, he fell into a coma. Von Loë died two days later. Barkhorn died on 11 January without regaining consciousness.

On 14 January, Barkhorn and his wife were buried in Tegernsee. He was given a military funeral, with many senior officers of the Bundesluftwaffe in attendance. Oberst Gert Overhoff, the Geschwaderkommodore of JaBoG 31 "Boelcke", carried his military decorations pillow. Generalleutnant Obleser, the Inspector of the Air Force, and Steinhoff gave a eulogy.

== Summary of career ==
=== Aerial victory claims ===
According to US historian David T. Zabecki, Barkhorn claimed 301 victories in 1,100 combat missions. He was shot down nine times, bailed out once and was wounded twice. Author Spick states his total number of combat missions was 1,104 and a mission-to-claim ratio of 3.67. Mathews and Foreman, authors of Luftwaffe Aces – Biographies and Victory Claims, researched the German Federal Archives and found records for 300 aerial victory claims, plus one further unconfirmed claim. All of his aerial victories were claimed on the Eastern Front. The authors Daniel and Gabor Horvath compared Soviet enemy loss reports to Barkhorn's claims over Hungary. In the timeframe 26 October 1944 to 5 January 1945, Barkhorn claimed 28 aerial victories, his 273rd to 300th aerial victory. In this timeframe, the authors found 22 matching Soviet losses, a corroboration of 79%.

=== Awards ===
- Pilot's Badge (3 May 1939)
- Iron Cross (1939)
  - 2nd class (23 October 1940)
  - 1st class (3 December 1940)
- Front Flying Clasp of the Luftwaffe in Gold with Pennant "1,100"
  - in Silver (20 April 1941)
  - in Gold (27 August 1941)
  - in Gold with Pennant (6 October 1942)
  - in Gold with Pennant "1,100" (11 February 1945)
- Combined Pilots-Observation Badge
- Honor Goblet of the Luftwaffe on 20 July 1942 as Oberleutnant and Staffelkapitän
- Wound Badge in Black (25 July 1942)
- German Cross in Gold on 21 August 1942 as Oberleutnant in the 4./Jagdgeschwader 52
- Eastern Medal (31 August 1942)
- Crimea Shield (15 March 1943)
- Slovak Medal of Valor in Silver 2nd Class (17 August 1943)
- Knight's Cross of the Iron Cross with Oak Leaves and Swords
  - Knight's Cross on 23 August 1942 as Oberleutnant and Staffelkapitän of the 4./Jagdgeschwader 52
  - 175th Oak Leaves on 11 January 1943 as Oberleutnant and Staffelkapitän of the 4./Jagdgeschwader 52
  - 52nd Swords on 2 March 1944 as Hauptmann and Gruppenkommandeur of the II./Jagdgeschwader 52

With an unknown date of presentation, Barkhorn was also awarded the Hungarian Cross of Valor, the Croatian Medal of Valor in Silver, and the Wehrmacht Long Service Award for four years of service.

=== Dates of rank ===
Wehrmacht
27 August 1939:	Leutnant (second lieutenant)
1 November 1941:	Oberleutnant (first lieutenant)
1 April 1943:	Hauptmann (captain)
1 April 1944:	Major (major)
Bundeswehr
19 June 1956:	Major
12 May 1958:	Oberstleutnant (lieutenant colonel)
28 September 1960:	Oberst (colonel)
10 September 1969:	Brigadegeneral (brigadier general; TR—temporary rank)
1 April 1970:	Brigadegeneral (brigadier general)
1 October 1973:	Generalmajor (major general)

== Notes ==
Military offices
Preceded by Major Johann Kogler	Commander of Jagdgeschwader 6 Horst Wessel; 16 January 1945 – 9 April 1945	Succeeded by Major Gerhard Schöpfel
Preceded by none	Commander of Jagdbombergeschwader 31 Boelcke; September 1957 – December 1962	Succeeded by Oberstleutnant Wilhelm Meyn
