= Boffin =

British slang term

Boffin is a British slang term for a scientist, engineer, or other person engaged in technical or scientific research and development. A "boffin" was viewed by some in the regular military or government services as odd, quirky or peculiar, though quite bright and essential to helping in the war effort through having and developing the key ideas leading to transformative military capabilities.

== Origins ==
=== Civil ===
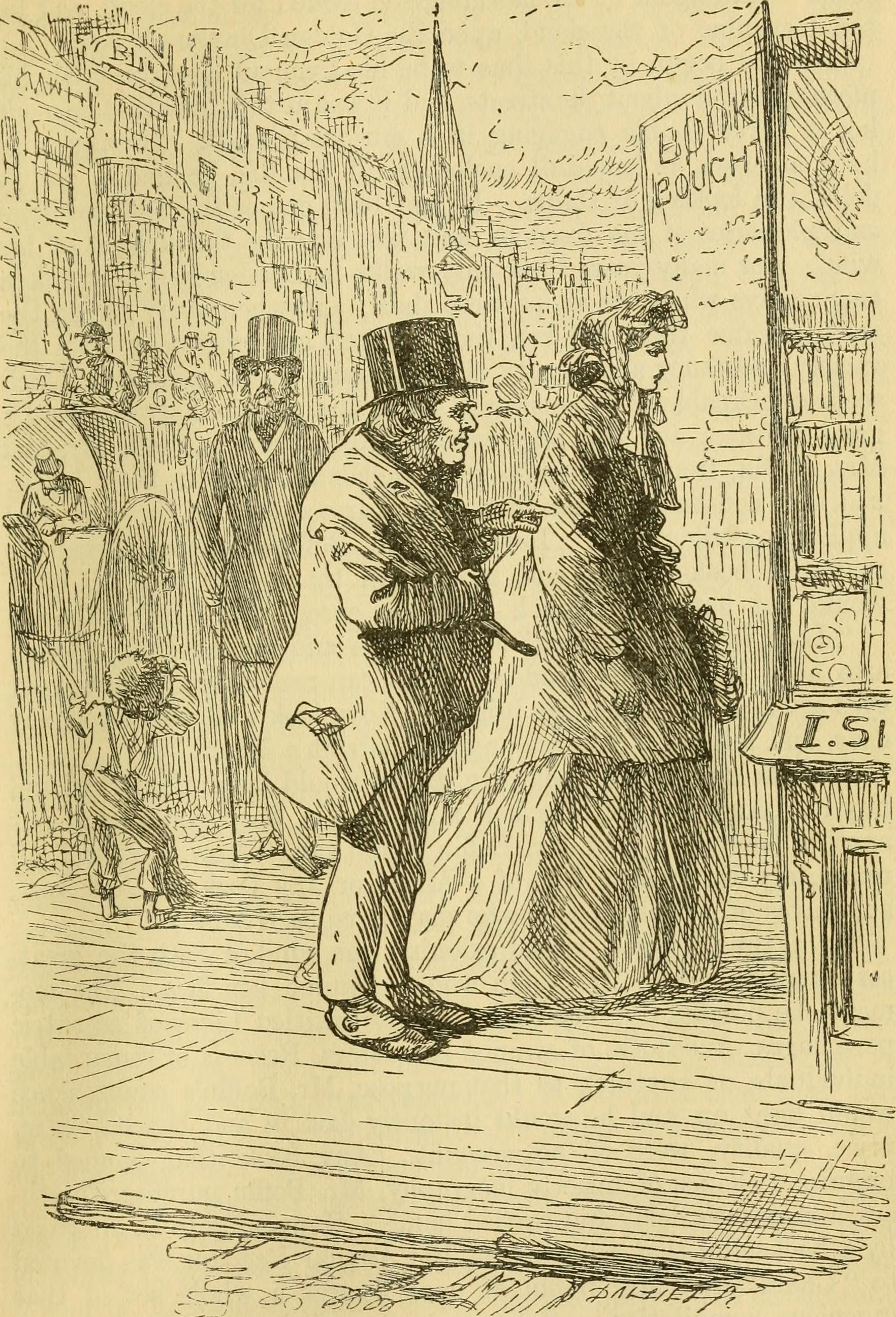
Illustration of Nicodemus Boffin from the Dickens novel Our Mutual Friend, a possible source of the term

The origins and etymology of boffin are obscure. A link to the mathematician and evolutionary theorist Buffon has been proposed. Alternatively, linguist Eric Partridge proposed the term derived from Nicodemus Boffin, the good-hearted 'golden dustman' character who appears in the novel Our Mutual Friend (1864/5) by Charles Dickens, described there as a "very odd-looking old fellow indeed". In the novel, Mr Boffin pursues a late-life education, employing Silas Wegg to teach him to read.

William Morris also has a man called Boffin, based on Charles Dickens and said to be a variant of 'Biffin', meet the newly arrived time traveller in his novel News from Nowhere (1890). Dickens had referred to a 'Miss Biffins', an artist with only vestigial arms and legs, in Martin Chuzzlewit (1843). Thus at this time a 'Boffin' is a good-hearted person who has suffered from 'hard times', been ill-regarded, taken an opportunity to better themselves and done well, demonstrating remarkable social mobility. Possibly ill-favoured in appearance, possibly artistic.

In 1894 Augustine Birrell invented a fictional character – Rev. Boffin B.A. – to epitomize those who bothered fellow Liberal politician Sir Frank Lockwood with seeming trifles. Sir Frank turned the joke on Birrell by writing letters to the papers and critical of him as if from Boffin, later published a popular book of cartoons on the affair and was only then identified as the author, as described in Birrell's humorous biography of Sir Frank.

J. R. R. Tolkien also had a police sergeant called Boffin in his children's tale Mr. Bliss (written around 1932, published 1982), but he is said to have derived the name from an Oxford family of bakers and confectioners rather than Dickens (as confirmed by his daughter Priscilla Tolkien). He later used Boffin as a surname for a family in The Hobbit (1937).

=== Military ===
The Oxford English Dictionary quotes use in The Times in September 1945 based on a Ministry of Aircraft Production press release:

1945 Times 15 Sept. 5/4 A band of scientific men who performed their wartime wonders at Malvern and apparently called themselves "the boffins".

Malvern was home to both the Telecommunications Research Establishment (TRE) and the Radar Research and Development Establishment (RRDE), who were later merged into the Radar Research Establishment (RRE). It developed RADAR in support of all the services. The then superintendent of TRE, A.P. Rowe used the term 'boffin' to refer to earlier R.A.F. usage and by 1942 an RAF training film (School for Secrets) cited 'boffin' as armed-forces slang for an RAF technician or research scientist. Post war, Sir Robert Watson-Watt, the British radar pioneer, cited Robert Hanbury Brown, who had been at RAF Bawdsey (later part of TRE), as the prototypical boffin, noting: "It is quite wrong to use the word ‘boffin’ simply to describe a scientist or technician; a boffin is essentially a middleman, a bridge between two worlds ...".

Sir Robert cites Air Vice-Marshal G. P. Chamberlain, who played a vital part in the use of radar to defeat night-bombers, as the source of the word. Chamberlain himself claimed that 'A Puffin, a bird with a mournful cry, got crossed with a Baffin, a mercifully obsolete Fleet Air Arm aircraft. Their offspring was a Boffin, a bird of astonishingly queer appearance, bursting with weird and sometimes inopportune ideas, but possessed of staggering inventiveness, analytical powers and persistence. Its ideas, like its eggs, were conical and unbreakable. You push the unwanted ones away, and they just roll back.'". A naval origin is supported by reports of an anti-submarine trial by HM Signal School April 1, 1941 based on equipment from TRE. Eric Partridge, in his dictionary of slang, noted that the word had been used in the Royal Navy as "an unkind term for any officer over forty", but this usage seems to have been overshadowed by that referred to by the OED, above.

Of its etymology Sir Robert himself wrote: “I am not quite sure about the true origins of this name of Boffin. ... I am sure it has nothing at all to do with that first literary “Back Room Boy,” the claustrophiliac Colonel Boffin, who as you remember never overtly emerged from his back room, although his voice was clearly audible from it. It is the very essence of the Boffin that he should emerge frequently and almost aggressively from the Back Room to which, however, he must return on his missions of interpretation and inspiration.”

The origin of the term appears to be Naval, rather than Air, but its main usage seems to have originated with Naval officers working with civilian radar 'boffins' and quickly adapted by other servicemen and boffins themselves.

A key innovation at TRE was Rowe's 'Sunday Soviets'. These reflected the lessons identified from the Great War as reflected in the Haldane principle, but adapted to suit the operational challenges. They allowed the boffins both to contribute more, and to be more recognized.

== Usage ==
=== World War II ===
World War II was regarded by many as a 'Wizard War'. War-time and immediate post-war reference to scientists was particularly associated with radar, either Malvern or Farnborough. Alternatively, Lindemann noted that Mervyn O'Gorman had inaugurated the use of scientific methods in aeronautical development at the Royal Aircraft Factory at Farnborough, developing a cadre of 'leaders and explorers' who have retrospectively been termed 'boffins'. Some "have been careful to differentiate between the true boffin and the 'nark', who was a member of the scientific staff of the Experimental Flying Section at Farnborough.' Similarly, the Secretary of State for War cites the contribution of an operational analyst to the U-boat war in 1943.”

The radar pioneer Robert Watson-Watt provided the following definition: "The Boffin is a researcher, of high scientific competence, who has learned that a device of great technical elegance, capable of a remarkable performance in the hands of a picked crew, is not necessarily a good weapon of war. He is the instrument for building into the design provisions which depend on close analysis of the vehicle in which the device is to operate, the field conditions in which it is to operate and above all things, the competence of those who are to operate, maintain, and repair it. He alone can save us from the danger of engendering electronic dinosaurs; he alone can provide on the one hand the knowledge on which the machine can be measured to the man and on the other, the knowledge on which can be based the selection, training, and (this is important) the inspiration of the normal human beings on whom its successful use, in the end, must rest. He must have an understanding and an appreciation of these normal human beings. He can reach these only through having their confidence. He is a middleman, but he is a middleman who can effect enormous economies and enormous increases in efficiencies. He is a rare bird, but he should be free to flit over the whole field of defense science, its origins, and its applications." He also noted that “It is a term of respect, and admiration, but particularly a term of affection—an affection which is expressed, as is the English way, in a slightly outside-in, jocular way so that the affection and admiration may not be regarded as too demonstrative.”

Thus a Boffin seems the type of person described by Isaac Newton (1642–1726/7), who, in his advice to the Admiralty, made an important distinction when he said that 'if, instead of sending observations of seamen to able mathematicians on land, the land would be able to send able mathematicians to sea, it would signify much more to the improvement of navigation and the safety of men's lives and estates on that element.'

Watson-Watt stated that 'the bill of the boffin has two separate functions. One is to poke into other people's business and the other is to puncture 'the more highly coloured and ornate eggs of the "Lesser Back Room Bird", which are quite inappropriate to the military scene.' Henry Tizard has also been regarded as the prototypical boffin.

An article published in 'The Journal' on 5 Dec 1969 attributed the origin of the term in reference to citizen scientists to Betty and Jack Rayner who were employed as scientist by the RAF in the summer of 1943 to support the war effort. An RAF colleague who liked to give Dickens' character names to his colleagues gave Betty the nickname Mrs. Boffin, and so Jack became known as Mr. Boffin.

According to the Daily Herald, "backroom boys known throughout the services of the United Nations [were known] as `Boffins`. [It] should be considered a badge of honour."

On VJ Day the Daily Herald reported: ”This is `Boffins Day` because for the first time it is permissible to tell something of the war saga of the backroom boys known throughout the services of the United Nations as `Boffins`. It is a dramatic and romantic story of a battle of wits, brains and inventive genius between the scientists of the United Nations and those of the enemy and the United Nations Team won hands down. ... Theirs was the best kept secret of the war they were conducting what had been aptly described as the very heart of the United Nations war effort.”

=== Cold War ===
In 1952 the Secretary of State for War noted the need to develop 'Colonel Boffins' at Shrivenham (1952). Notably, Richard Vincent acquired the nickname 'the boffin' after working at Malvern (1960–62) as a Gunnery Staff Captain and, via RMCS Shrivenham, rose to become Chief of the Defence Staff (United Kingdom).

In the 12 January 1953 issue of Life magazine, a short article on Malcolm Compston depicted him testing "the Admiralty's new plastic survival suit" in the Arctic Ocean; the article, entitled "Cold Bath for a Boffin", defines the term for its American audience as "civilian scientist working with the British Navy" and notes that his potentially life-saving work demonstrates "why the term 'boffin', which first began as a sailor's expression of joking contempt, has become instead one of affectionate admiration". By 1956 the US Navy apparently regarded boffins as too influential.

By 1962 Boffins were characterised as 'the man (sic) who could understand the viewpoint of the Services, who worked with them, and who frequently shared their dangers' and R V Jones, wartime head of scientific intelligence, was referred to as a boffin. By the late 60s the term was sometimes being used to include all scientists who had worked at Malvern, irrespective of how closely they worked with the services, even 'backroom' staff.

=== Post Cold War ===
Boffin continued, in the immediate postwar period, to carry some of its wartime connotation, as a modern-day wizard who labours in secret to create incomprehensible devices of great power. For example, the comics of the period depicted them as developing imaginative machines. However, their more nuanced wartime role was not reflected in popular culture, such as the 1951 Festival of Britain and the term was used in the UK parliament (1953) to refer to boffins as either narrow academics or the catalyst for growth.

The image of the technical hero was popularised by Nevil Shute's novel No Highway (1948), Paul Brickhill's non-fiction book The Dambusters (1951) and Shute's autobiography Slide Rule (1954). The Dambusters film (1954) also featured boffins as heroes, as did stand-alone films such as The Man in the White Suit (1951) and The Sound Barrier (1952).

John Wyndham's novel The Kraken Wakes (1953) includes a song called "The Boffin's Lament" or "The Lay of the Baffled Boffin", with Naval Boffins. By 1958 sound engineers such as Shute and Frank Cordell were being referred to as ‘Pop Boffins’. More recently, the term 'boffin' has been used to cover all of Churchill's war-winning Wizards, including atomic scientists, aeronautical engineers and the scientists of the Department of Miscellaneous Weapons Development (including Shute). By the late 60s the term boffins was being used for any research scientists who were making a difference. Alan Turing has been described as a 'boffin' both for his cryptanalytic wizardry and his backroom work on computers, as have some 'Pop' architects.

However, while the main characters in the semi-autobiographical films The Small Back Room (1948) and No Highway in the Sky (1948) came good in the end, many scientists were presented as figures of fun, including those working with computers, in bomb disposal and on aircraft. Moreover the films (unlike the books) used the term 'Boffin' to apply to any Back-Room Boy, with unfortunate connotations. By 1959 a biography refers to 'muzzle-headed boffins in cob-webby small backrooms'.

Moreover between 1968 and 1972 a series of English language primers portraying a 'mad professor', reinforced by a British TV children's comedy Bright's Boffins (1970–72), became the stereotype for children's literature. By the 1980s boffins were relegated, in UK popular culture, to semi-comic supporting characters such as Q, the fussy armourer-inventor in the James Bond films, and the term itself gradually took on a negative connotation within society at large. Thus, by the late 1990s, while the need for 'high-calibre' research staff with 'intimate knowledge' of users and their potential needs was well recognized by potential employers, the term 'boffin' was no longer used in its original sense, lest it conjure up images of 'mad scientists'.

This negative view changed after 2003, with Backroom Boys: The Secret Return of the British Boffin, but without making the original distinction between 'back-room boys' and boffins. By 2009 a popular history noted how enthusiastic 'home-taught boffins' and academics contributed to both world wars, and came to have 'key positions in directing the war effort' and a nostalgic popular book to accompany the Science Museum's 'Dan Dare and the Birth of High-Tech Britain' Exhibition described the optimism as the war-time boffins turned their attention to turning Britain into 'a place of ingenious, and beautifully crafted home-spun technology and design', until thwarted by the consumerist policies of Harold Macmillan. Norman Foster is cited as carrying forward the spirit of the boffin.

=== Popular culture ===
The term 'boffin' has become widely used in the UK popular media to refer to any scientist or scientific expert, especially those engaged in research. The Institute of Physics is running a campaign to limit this usage, due to the negative image.

In its July 1984 edition, Road and Track commented: "Peter Wright, formerly aerodynamic engineer for Team Lotus Research and Development, is known there as 'The Boffin' for his scientific wizardry." This Boffin would go on to pioneer active suspension in Formula-One.

The term is used frequently in the sketches of comedy duo Mitchell & Webb, particularly in the reoccurring sketch Big Talk.
