= Taktisches Luftwaffengeschwader 31 =

Tactical Air Force Wing 31
- Taktisches Luftwaffengeschwader 31 "Boelcke"
- Active: 20 June 1958–present
- Country: Germany
- Branch: German Air Force
- Role: Ground Attack
- Garrison/HQ: Nörvenich Air Base
- Patron: Oswald Boelcke

Commanders
- Current commander: Oberleutnant René Diegeler
- Notable commanders: Gerhard Barkhorn; Wilhelm Meyn; Friedrich Obleser

Aircraft flown
- Attack: Formerly: Republic F-84F Thunderstreak; Lockheed F-104 Starfighter; Panavia Tornado IDS; Present: Eurofighter Typhoon

Taktisches Luftwaffengeschwader 31 "Boelcke" (Tactical Air Force Wing 31; abbreviated as TaktLwG 31 "B"), formerly known as Jagdbombergeschwader 31 (Fighter-Bomber Wing 31; abbreviated as: JaBoG 31), is a fighter-bomber wing of the German Air Force (Luftwaffe). The wing is based in west Germany at Nörvenich Air Base. Its role are Air Interdiction, Offensive Counter Air and Close Air Support. The wing flies the Eurofighter Typhoon.

On 1 October 2013, the renamed unit also became the parent unit of the newly established Tactical Air Force Group "Richthofen".

== History ==
The wing was raised during 1957 on Büchel Air Base as Nörvenich Air Base had not been readied yet. On 1 October 1957 the 1st Squadron was officially activated making it the oldest squadron still in service with the German Air Force. During January 1958 the wing began its move to Nörvenich and on 20 June 1958 the wing was officially activated there. On 19 January 1959 Jagdbombergeschwader 31 became the first German Air Force wing to be assigned to NATO. On 20 April 1961 the wing was given the name "Boelcke", in honor of the World War I Luftstreitkräfte fighter pilot Oswald Boelcke. Initially equipped with Republic F-84F Thunderstreak fighters, the wing received Lockheed F-104 Starfighters starting in 1961 and became the first operational air force Starfighter wing on 20 June 1962.

With the introduction of the Panavia Tornado IDS in 1979 the Jagdbombergeschwader 31 again was the first unit to switch to the new plane. When the air force began fielding its newest combat plane the Eurofighter Typhoon JaBoG 31. The first four Eurofighters arrived at Nörvenich on 16 December 2009 and with the departure of the last Tornados on 25 June 2010 JaBoG 31 became the Luftwaffes first operational Eurofighter wing. A total of 31 Eurofighters will be based at Nörvenich.

Aircraft operated by JaBoG 31
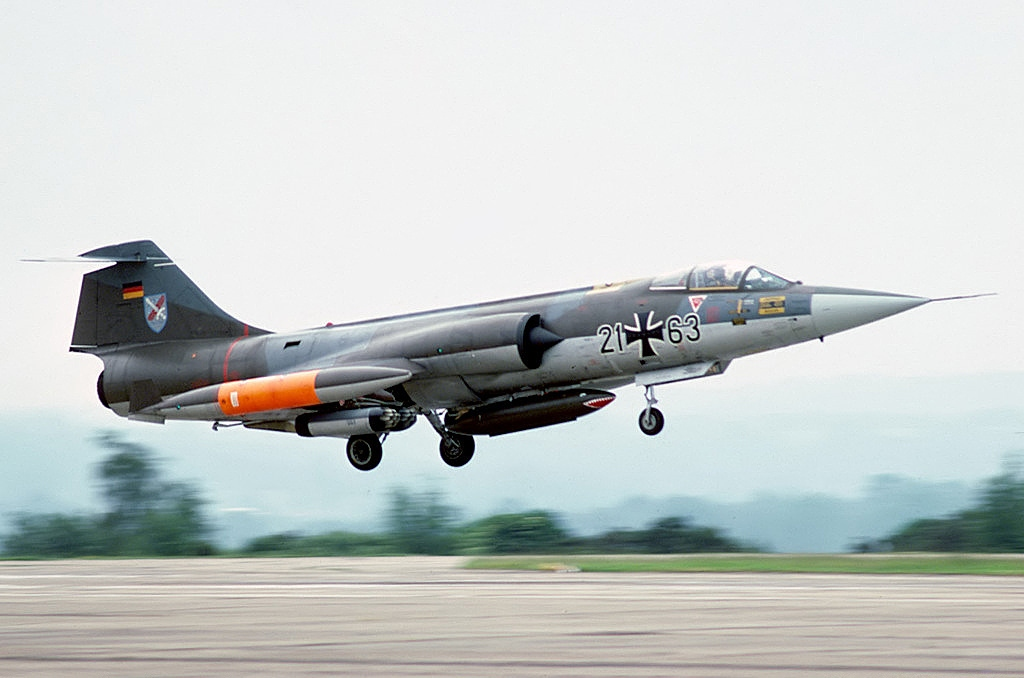
F-104 Starfighter

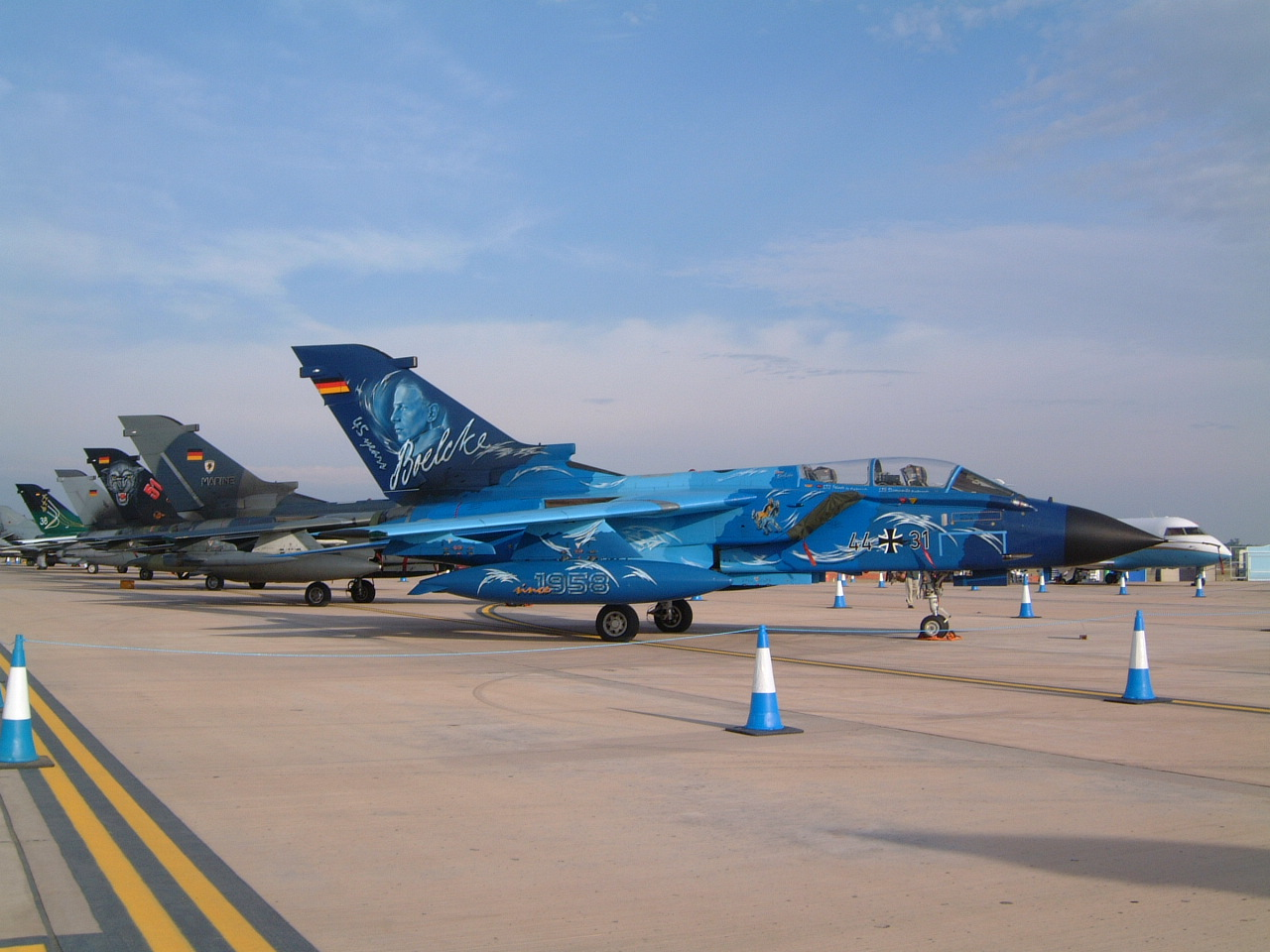
Tornado IDS

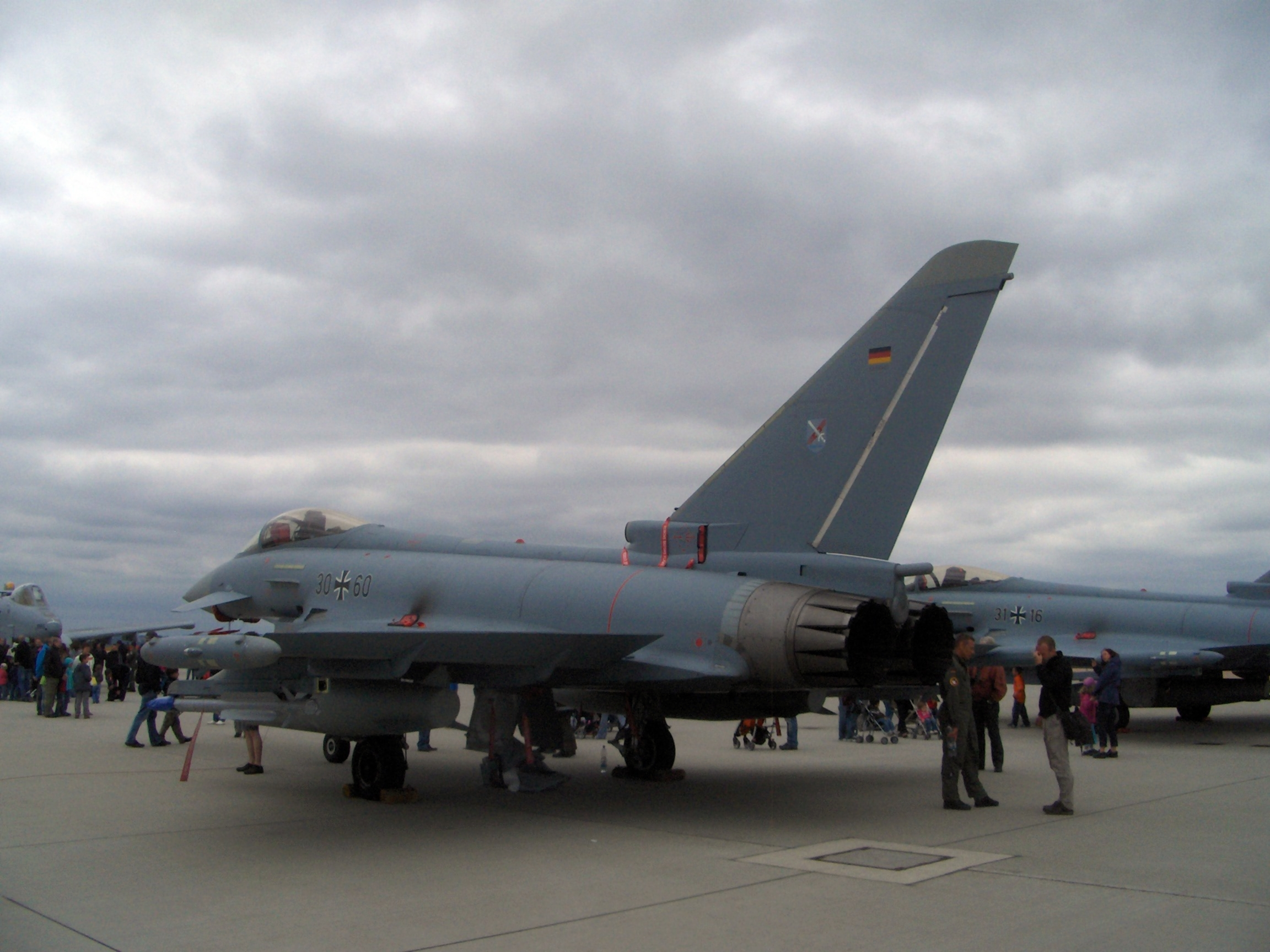
Eurofighter Typhoon

== Accidents ==
Since its inception JaBoG 31 has lost 33 pilots in accidents, 18 of which died between 1962 and 1979 in F-104 Starfighter accidents.

On 23 June 2014, a Eurofighter Typhoon was involved in a mid-air collision with a Learjet 35A over Olsberg, Germany. The severely damaged aircraft made a safe landing at Nörvenich Air Base. The Learjet crashed, killing both pilots.
