= 2014 Olsberg mid-air collision =

Aviation accident in Germany

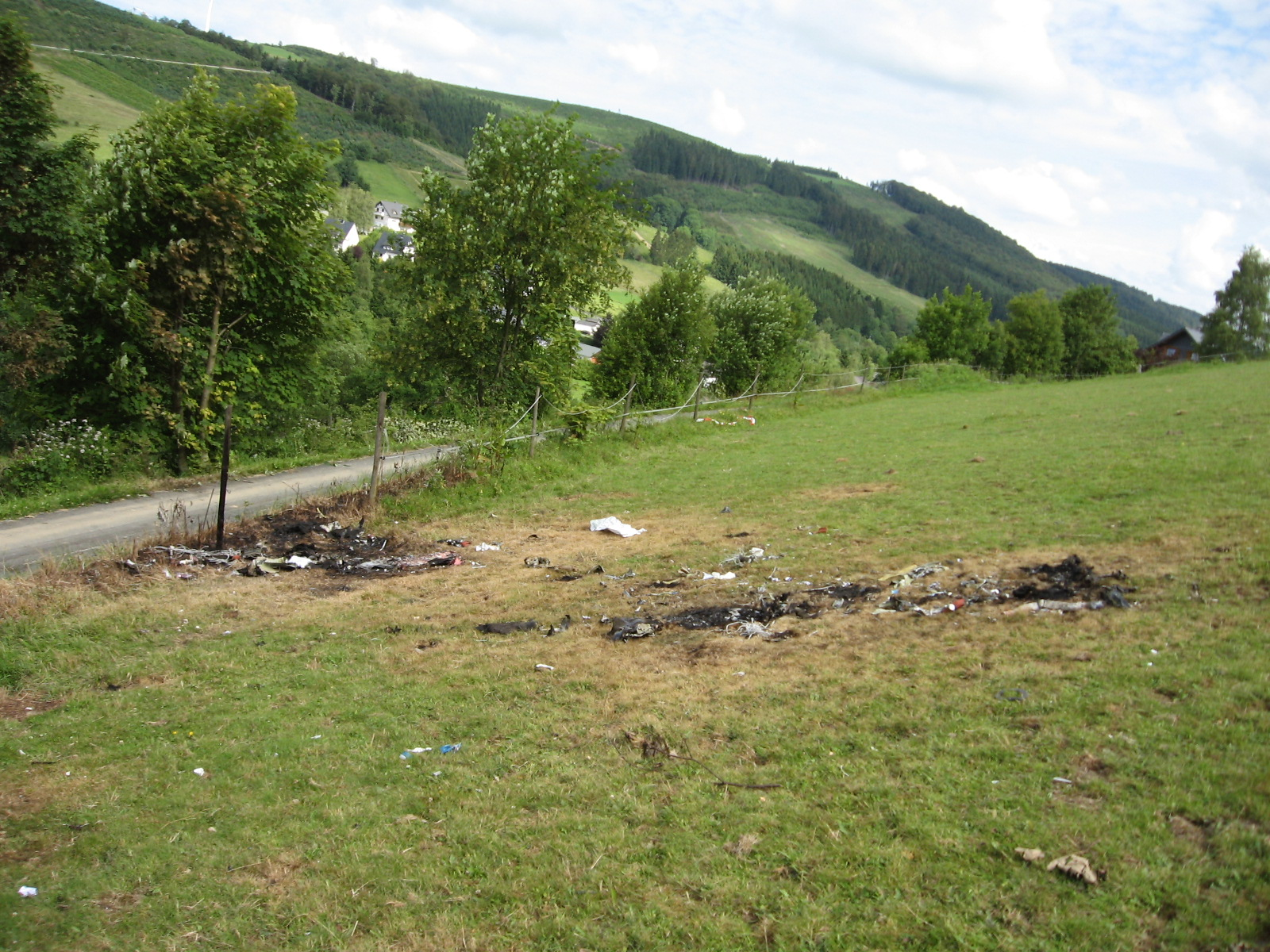
- The crash site of the Learjet

Accident
- Date: 23 June 2014
- Summary: Mid-air collision due to pilot error on the Learjet
- Site: Olsberg, North Rhine-Westphalia, Germany; 51.279°N 8.448°E
- Total fatalities: 2 (all on the Learjet)
- Total survivors: 1 (Eurofighter Typhoon)

First aircraft
- 30+91, the Typhoon involved in the collision, photographed in April 2013
- Type: Eurofighter Typhoon
- Operator: German Air Force
- Registration: 30+91
- Flight origin: Nörvenich Air Base, Germany
- Destination: Nörvenich Air Base
- Occupants: 1
- Crew: 1
- Survivors: 1

Second aircraft
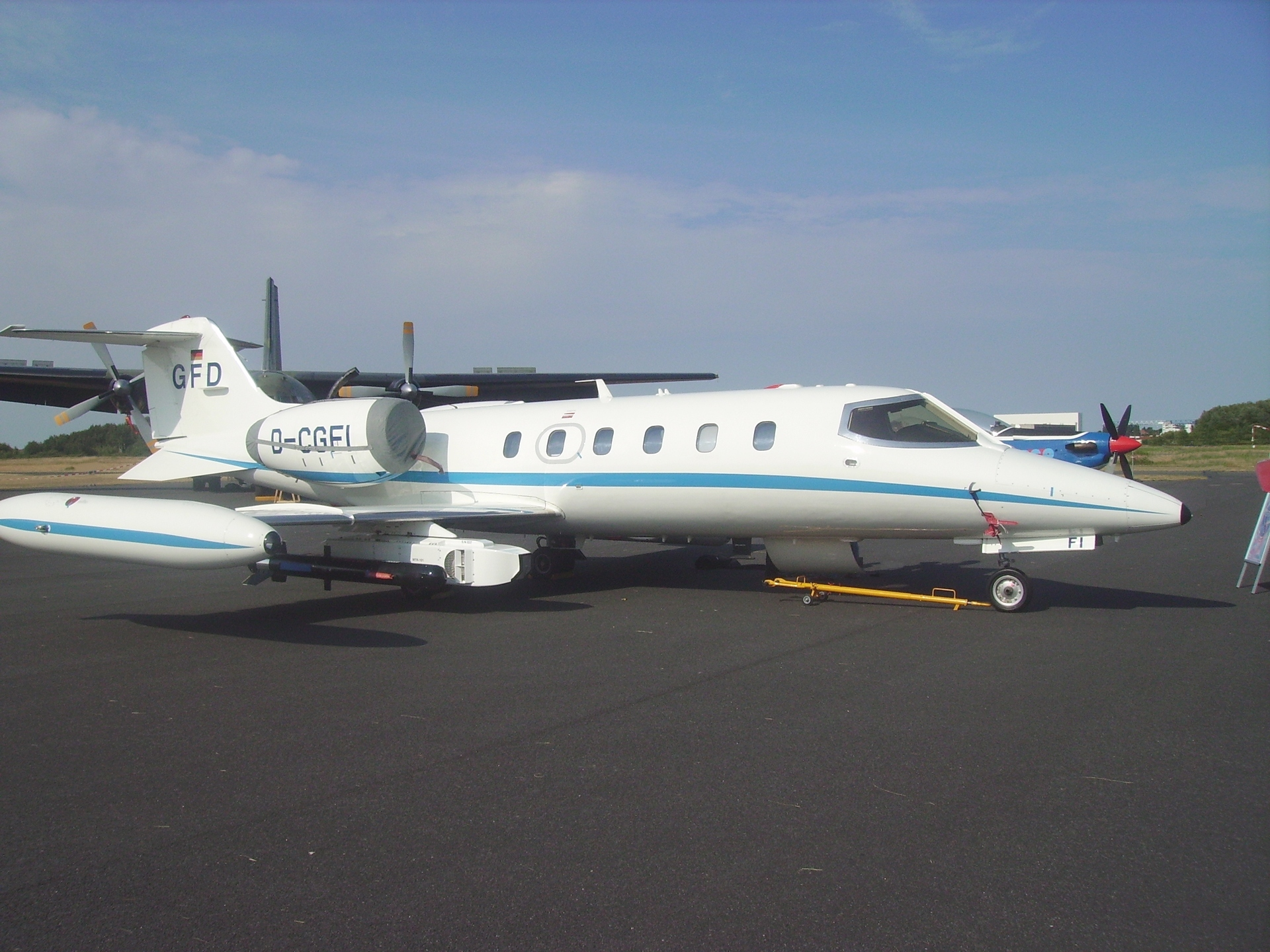
- D-CGFI, the Learjet involved in the collision, 2008
- Type: Learjet 35A
- Operator: GFD Gesellschaft Fur Flugzieldarstellung
- Registration: D-CGFI
- Flight origin: Hohn Air Base, Germany
- Destination: Hohn Air Base
- Occupants: 2
- Crew: 2
- Fatalities: 2
- Survivors: 0

On 23 June 2014, a German Eurofighter Typhoon fighter jet and a Learjet 35 business jet participating in a military exercise collided mid-air over Olsberg, North Rhine-Westphalia, Germany. The Learjet subsequently crashed to the ground with the loss of both crew members on board. The Typhoon was damaged but managed to land safely.

== Collision ==
The accident happened at 14:38 CEST (12:38 UTC). (Note: "History of the Flight" (interim report, page 4).) Two Eurofighter Typhoons were on exercise with the Learjet in the Elpe-Olsberg area. The Learjet was simulating a civilian airliner that had been hijacked and had broken off radio contact with Air Traffic Control, while the Typhoons were simulating a military response to such a scenario. (Note: "Planned Training Procedure" (interim report, page 13).) The lead Typhoon intercepted the Learjet, and as the latter turned to follow it, the two aircraft collided. (Note: "Flight data analysis" (final report, pages 44–45).)

The Learjet crashed about 100 metres (110 yd) from houses in Olsberg, killing both crew members. (Note: "Wreckage and Impact Information" (interim report, page 9).) The Typhoon aircraft was severely damaged, but was able to land safely at Nörvenich Air Base, near Cologne. The second Typhoon landed at Cologne Bonn Airport.

== Aircraft ==
The first aircraft was a Eurofighter Typhoon, msn GS0070. The aircraft was built in 2012. (Note: "Aircraft Information" (interim report, page 8).) It was operated by Taktisches Luftwaffengeschwader 31 "Boelcke", Luftwaffe. It was based at Nörvenich Air Base.

The second aircraft was a Learjet 35A, registered D-CGFI, msn 35A-612, which had first flown in 1986. (Note: "Aircraft Information" (interim report, page 7).) It was operated by the GFD Gesellschaft für Flugzieldarstellung, a subsidiary company of Airbus Defence and Space, and was based at Hohn Air Base.

== Investigations ==
Investigations into the accident were carried out by the General Flugsicherheit der Bundeswehr and the Bundesstelle für Flugunfalluntersuchung (BFU). The cockpit voice recorder and flight data recorder of the Learjet were recovered on the day of the accident, from a site 3 kilometres (2 mi) from the crash site of the aircraft. The data from these devices were published in the BFU's interim report in September. (Note: "Flight Recorder" (interim report, page 9).) The BFU's final report into the accident was published in August 2015. It stated that the causes of the accident were:

- Immediate Causes:
  - During positioning for the interception, the collision risk due to unexpected manoeuvres of the intercepted airplane was not sufficiently taken into consideration.
  - The Learjet crew did not take into account the risks due to possible limitations of the field of vision and the distraction of using the computer when deciding their task distribution. Due to insufficient situational awareness during the intervention, the Learjet crew continued the turn with an excessive bank angle despite the loss of visual contact with the Eurofighter flying at the inside of the turn.
- Systemic Causes:
  - The operator had not specified in detail how the crew should distribute their tasks during Renegade exercises.
  - Neither the operator commissioned to conduct the aerial target demonstration nor the Air Force had sufficiently described the Renegade training nor had a commensurate risk analysis been done.
