= Wilhelm Meyn =

German Air Force general and WW2 veteran

- Born: 3 June 1923; Hamburg
- Died: 4 May 2002 (aged 78); Hoppstädten-Weiersbach
- Military career
- Allegiance: Nazi Germany; West Germany
- Branch: Luftwaffe; German Air Force
- Service years: 1940–45; 1956–79
- Rank: Oberleutnant (Wehrmacht); Generalmajor (Bundeswehr)
- Units: StG 3, SG 3 Jagdgeschwader 72 "Westfalen"; Jagdbombergeschwader 31 "Boelcke"
- Commands: Jagdgeschwader 72 "Westfalen"; Jagdbombergeschwader 31 "Boelcke"
- Conflicts: World War II: Battle of Kursk; Kerch–Eltigen Operation; Crimean Offensive; Courland Pocket; Defense of the Reich
- Awards: Knight's Cross of the Iron Cross

Wilhelm Meyn (3 June 1923 – 4 May 2002) was a general in the German Air Force. During World War II, he served in the Luftwaffe and was a recipient of the Knight's Cross of the Iron Cross of Nazi Germany. In 1956, he joined the Bundeswehr of West Germany and rose to the rank of Generalmajor, retiring in 1979.

== Summary of career ==
=== Aerial victory claims ===
Mathews and Foreman, authors of Luftwaffe Aces — Biographies and Victory Claims, researched the German Federal Archives and state that Meyn was crited with approximately 26 aerial victories, all of which claimed on the Eastern Front.

=== Awards and decorations ===
- German Cross in Gold on 28 January 1944 as Leutnant in the III./Sturzkampfgeschwader 3
- Knight's Cross of the Iron Cross on 24 October 1944 as Leutnant and Staffelführer of the 9./Schlachtgeschwader 3

Military offices
Preceded by —	Commander of Aufklärungsgeschwader 52; 1959 – December 1959	Succeeded by Oberst Roderich Cescotti
Preceded by —	Commander of Jagdbombergeschwader 72; 13 March 1961 – 14 December 1962	Succeeded by Oberstleutnant Hans Gerhard Opel
Preceded by Oberstleutnant Gerhard Barkhorn	Commander of Jagdbombergeschwader 31; 17 December 1962 – 17 December 1963	Succeeded by Oberst Friedrich Obleser
