= Werner Quast =

German fighter ace and Knight's Cross recipient

- Born: 21 June 1920; Thale
- Died: 12 July 1962 (aged 42); Mittenwald
- Military career
- Allegiance: Nazi Germany (to 1945); West Germany
- Branch: Luftwaffe; German Air Force
- Service years: 1940–1945; 1956–1962
- Rank: Fahnenjunker-Oberfeldwebel (Wehrmacht); Hauptfeldwebel (Bundeswehr)
- Nickname: "Quax"
- Unit: JG 52
- Conflicts: World War II: Battle of the Caucasus; Battle of Kursk
- Awards: Knight's Cross of the Iron Cross

Werner Hermann Quast (21 June 1920 – 12 July 1962) was a German Luftwaffe ace and recipient of the Knight's Cross of the Iron Cross during World War II. The Knight's Cross of the Iron Cross, and its variants were the highest awards in the military and paramilitary forces of Nazi Germany during World War II. Following a mid-air collision on 7 August 1943, he was taken prisoner by Soviet forces and was held until 1949. He joined the postwar Luftwaffe in 1956 and died in a helicopter accident in Mittenwald on 12 July 1962. During his career he was credited with 84 aerial victories, all on the Eastern Front.

== Career ==
Quast was born on 21 June 1920 in Thale of the Weimar Republic. Following flight training, (Note: Flight training in the Luftwaffe progressed through the levels A1, A2 and B1, B2, referred to as A/B flight training. A training included theoretical and practical training in aerobatics, navigation, long-distance flights and dead-stick landings. The B courses included high-altitude flights, instrument flights, night landings and training to handle the aircraft in difficult situations.) he was posted to the 4. Staffel (4th squadron) of Jagdgeschwader 52 (JG 52—52nd Fighter Wing) in the summer of 1942. At the time, the Staffel was under the command of Oberleutnant Gerhard Barkhorn and subordinated to II. Gruppe (2nd group) of JG 52 headed by Hauptmann Johannes Steinhoff.

=== War against the Soviet Union ===
In August 1942, II. Gruppe was subordinated to VIII. Fliegerkorps and supported the 6th Army offensive to capture Stalingrad. On 20 August, II. Gruppe reached the airfield at Tusov, approximately 25 kilometers (16 miles) southwest of Kalach-na-Donu on the western bank of the Don, from where the Gruppe operated in the combat area of Stalingrad. Flying from this airfield, Quast claimed his first aerial victory on 23 August when he shot down a Lavochkin-Gorbunov-Gudkov LaGG-3 fighter. Six days later, Quast claimed two further LaGG fighters in the same combat area.

In September 1942, II. Gruppe was ordered into the Battle of the Caucasus, supporting Army Group South on the front over the Caucasus. Opposing it was the 4th and 5th Air Armies of the Red Air Force. The Gruppe then moved to Maykop located in the North Caucasus on 21 September where, with the exception of 24 to 29 October, they were based until 26 November. Operating from Maykop, Quast claimed his fourth and fifth aerial victory when he again claimed two LaGG fighters shot down on 7 October. To support the German forces fighting in the Battle of Stalingrad forced the Luftwaffe to relocate its forces and ordered II. Gruppe to move from Maykop to Morozovsk, located approximately 200 kilometers (120 miles) west of Stalingrad, on 26 November.

=== Kuban bridgehead and Crimea ===
II./JG 52 insignia

The Gruppe was moved to the combat area of the Kuban bridgehead on 10 February 1943 where it was initially based at an airfield at Slavyansk-na-Kubani. Due to whether conditions, II. Gruppe then moved to Kerch on 16 February. While based at Slavyansk-na-Kubani, Quast claimed three aerial victories on 11 February including two Polikarpov I-16 fighters. The next day, he shot down an Ilyushin Il-2 ground-attack aircraft followed by four fighters claimed destroyed on 13 February. Operating from Kerch, Quast claimed a I-16 fighter shot down on 25 February and a LaGG-3 fighter the next day followed by a Petlyakov Pe-2 bomber on 5 March. On 13 March, the Gruppe moved to Anapa located on the northern coast of the Black Sea near the Sea of Azov and was fighting in the Battle of the Caucasus.

Flying from Anapa, Quast sank a Soviet motor torpedo boat of the Black Sea Fleet in the area of Gelendzhik on 20 April 1943. By end-April 1943, credited with 38 aerial victories, Quast had become the fourth highest scoring active fighter pilot of II. Gruppe of JG 52. At the time, the most successful fighter pilots of the Gruppe were Oberleutnant Heinz Schmidt with 130 aerial victories to date, Oberleutnant Barkhorn with 124 claims to date, followed by Leutnant Helmut Haberda with 49 aerial victories. By the end of May, Quast had moved into third place within II. Gruppe, his number of aerial victories had increased to 52 claims. In June, his number of aerial victories had reached 65 claims. For this, Quast was awarded the Honour Goblet of the Luftwaffe (Ehrenpokal der Luftwaffe) on 25 June. On 23 July, he received the German Cross in Gold (Deutsches Kreuz in Gold).

On 7 August, Quast claimed three aerial victories over Yakovlev Yak-1 fighters on an early morning mission in the vicinity southwest of Novorossiysk. During this aerial combat, his Messerschmitt Bf 109 G-6 (Werknummer 15844—factory number) collided with the debris of his third claim. He bailed out approximately 40 km (25 mi) southwest of Novorossiysk over the Black Sea and was taken prisoner of war. During his captivity, he was awarded the Knight's Cross of the Iron Cross (Ritterkreuz des Eisernen Kreuzes) on 31 December 1943 in absentia. The Soviets released him as a prisoner of war in 1949.

== Later life and death ==
Following World War II, Quast joined the post-war Bundesluftwaffe as a Hauptfeldwebel (master sergeant). On 12 July 1962, Quast was killed in a flying accident when the Aérospatiale Alouette III light utility helicopter, on which he was riding as a passenger, flew into a cable near Mittenwald killing all on board. He is listed on the Ehrenmal der Bundeswehr (Bundeswehr Memorial).

== Summary of career ==
=== Aerial victory claims ===
According to US historian David T. Zabecki, Quast was credited with 84 aerial victories. Spick also lists Quast with 84 aerial victories claimed in an unknown combat missions. Mathews and Foreman, authors of Luftwaffe Aces — Biographies and Victory Claims, researched the German Federal Archives and found records for 84 aerial victories, all of which claimed on the Eastern Front.

Victory claims were logged to a map-reference (PQ = Planquadrat), for example "PQ 49342". The Luftwaffe grid map (Jägermeldenetz) covered all of Europe, western Russia and North Africa and was composed of rectangles measuring 15 minutes of latitude by 30 minutes of longitude, an area of about 360 square miles (930 km^{2}). These sectors were then subdivided into 36 smaller units to give a location area 3 km × 4 km (1.9 mi × 2.5 mi) in size.

Chronicle of aerial victories
This and the ♠ (Ace of spades) indicates those aerial victories which made Quast an "ace-in-a-day", a term which designates a fighter pilot who has shot down five or more airplanes in a single day. This and the ? (question mark) indicates information discrepancies listed by Prien, Stemmer, Rodeike, Bock, Mathews and Foreman.
Claim	Date	Time	Type	Location	Claim	Date	Time	Type	Location
– 4. Staffel of Jagdgeschwader 52 – Eastern Front — August 1942 – 3 February 1943
1	23 August 1942	09:40	LaGG-3	PQ 49342 south of Stalingrad	4	7 October 1942	13:26	LaGG-3	PQ 95674, Gunaiberg; 45 km (28 mi) northeast of Tuapse
2	29 August 1942	06:15	LaGG-3	PQ 49212 northeast of Grebenka	5	7 October 1942	13:35	LaGG-3	PQ 95674, Gunaiberg; 45 km (28 mi) northeast of Tuapse
3	29 August 1942	06:17	LaGG-3	PQ 49212 northeast of Grebenka					
– 4. Staffel of Jagdgeschwader 52 – Eastern Front — 4 February – 7 August 1943
6	11 February 1943	07:25	I-153	PQ 34 Ost 8537, Gelendzhik; 25 km (16 mi) east of Novocherkassk	46	26 May 1943	16:20? (Note: According to Mathews and Foreman claimed at 16:30.)	Yak-1	PQ 34 Ost 75892; Black Sea, 60 km (37 mi) south of Gelendzhik
7	11 February 1943	10:45	I-16	PQ 34 Ost 75461; Black Sea, 5 km (3.1 mi) west of Kabardinka	47	28 May 1943	09:34	Yak-1	PQ 34 Ost 76892, northeast of Kijewskoje vicinity of Kijewskoje
8	11 February 1943	11:05	I-16	PQ 34 Ost 75452; 8 km (5.0 mi) south of Novorossiysk	48♠	30 May 1943	07:23	Il-2 m.H. (Note: The "m.H." refers to an Ilyushin Il-2 with rear gunner (mit Heckschütze).)	PQ 34 Ost 75152 vicinity of Anapa
9	12 February 1943	13:15	Il-2	PQ 34 Ost 85433 south of Stawropoliskaja	49♠	30 May 1943	07:38	Yak-1	PQ 34 Ost 75182 vicinity of Kutak
10	13 February 1943	07:30	I-16	PQ 34 Ost 85414 over sea, southwest of Anapa	50♠	30 May 1943	07:50	Yak-1	PQ 34 Ost 7536
11	13 February 1943	07:33	I-16	PQ 34 Ost 85442 east of Krassnyi	51♠	30 May 1943	15:30	Yak-1	PQ 34 Ost 76884 vicinity of Gostagejewo
12	13 February 1943	07:35	I-153	over hight 591	52♠	30 May 1943	15:40	Yak-1	PQ 34 Ost 76864, Kruglik north of Kessjetowa
13	13 February 1943	13:37	LaGG-3	PQ 34 Ost 8592; 25 km (16 mi) southeast of Novocherkassk	53	31 May 1943	10:43	P-39	PQ 34 Ost 86721 southeast of Slavyansk-na-Kubani
14	25 February 1943	07:15	I-16	PQ 34 Ost 75423 southwest of Novorossiysk	54	3 June 1943	10:55	Yak-1	PQ 34 Ost 86772 south of Trojzkaja
15	26 February 1943	10:47	LaGG-3	PQ 34 Ost 75464, southeast of Kabardinka; Black Sea, 5 km (3.1 mi) west of Kabardinka	55	3 June 1943	18:37	Yak-1	PQ 34 Ost 75231, northwest of Krymskaja northwest of Krymsk
16	5 March 1943	09:40	Pe-2	PQ 34 Ost 76732 south of Ssewernije	56	4 June 1943	05:40	Pe-2	PQ 34 Ost 86723 vicinity of Tichonowskij
17	28 March 1943	05:30	La-5	PQ 34 Ost 76691 west of Slavyansk-na-Kubani	57	4 June 1943	10:20	Yak-1	PQ 34 Ost 85113 east of Krymsk
18	28 March 1943	05:50	P-39	PQ 34 Ost 86572 north of Slavyansk-na-Kubani	58	5 June 1943	11:30	Yak-1	PQ 34 Ost 85141 east of Krymsk
19	29 March 1943	15:12	I-16	PQ 34 Ost 76692 vicinity of Deaschi	59	5 June 1943	18:50	La-5	PQ 34 Ost 75232, southeast of Kijewskoje north of Krymsk
20	29 March 1943	15:15	I-16	PQ 34 Ost 86543 west of Krassnoarmejskaja	60	8 June 1943	09:23	LaGG-3	PQ 34 Ost 76821 vicinity of Kalabatka
21	30 March 1943	06:20	LaGG-3	PQ 34 Ost 8654	61	9 June 1943	18:30	La-5	PQ 34 Ost 85111 vicinity of Krasshyj Golubowski
22	30 March 1943	06:30	LaGG-3	PQ 34 Ost 8652	62	10 June 1943	06:31	Yak-1	PQ 34 Ost 85111 vicinity of Krasshyj Golubowski
23	11 April 1943	05:48	LaGG-3	PQ 34 Ost 86584 east of Slavyansk-na-Kubani	63	10 June 1943	11:50	La-5	PQ 34 Ost 76894, east of Kijewskoje vicinity of Kijewskoje
24	15 April 1943	12:29	I-16	PQ 34 Ost 85141 east of Krymsk	64	10 June 1943	11:52	La-5	PQ 34 Ost 85111 vicinity of Krasshyj Golubowski
25	18 April 1943	14:52	Yak-1	PQ 34 Ost 86794 east of Mingrelskaya	65	13 June 1943	10:42	La-5	PQ 34 Ost 86774 vicinity of Bondarenka
26	19 April 1943	16:43	Yak-1	PQ 34 Ost 75424; 4 km (2.5 mi) east of Novorossiysk	66	16 July 1943	06:25	Pe-2	PQ 34 Ost 85122 vicinity of Sswobodnyj
27	19 April 1943	16:45	Yak-1	PQ 34 Ost 75434 vicinity of Kabardinka	67	16 July 1943	14:32	Yak-1	PQ 34 Ost 66632
28	21 April 1943	08:48	P-40	PQ 34 Ost 75434 vicinity of Kabardinka	68	21 July 1943	16:42	Yak-1	PQ 34 Ost 75351 over sea, south of Anapa
29	21 April 1943	09:20	Yak-1	PQ 34 Ost 75462, west of Kabardinka vicinity of Kabardinka	69♠	22 July 1943	07:05	Yak-1	PQ 34 Ost 75232, southeast of Kijewskoje north of Krymsk
30	27 April 1943	14:15	Yak-1	PQ 34 Ost 85154 vicinity of Achtyrskaja	70♠	22 July 1943	07:14	Yak-1	PQ 34 Ost 85121 vicinity of Sswobodnyj
31	27 April 1943	17:06	Yak-1	PQ 34 Ost 85172 vicinity of Beregowoj	71♠	22 July 1943	11:35	Yak-1	PQ 34 Ost 85141 east of Krymsk
32	27 April 1943	17:20	Yak-1? (Note: According to Mathews and Foreman claimed as a Lavochkin-Gorbunov-Gudkov LaGG-3.)	PQ 34 Ost 85213 vicinity of Rekrowski	72♠	22 July 1943	11:45	Il-2	PQ 34 Ost 75231, northwest of Krymskaja northwest of Krymsk
33	28 April 1943	11:40	Yak-1	PQ 34 Ost 85183 vicinity of Erwinskij	73♠	22 July 1943	16:19	Yak-1	PQ 34 Ost 75232, southeast of Kijewskoje north of Krymsk
34	29 April 1943	08:45	Yak-1	PQ 34 Ost 85112 east of Mertschanskaja	74♠	22 July 1943	18:32	Il-2 m.H.	PQ 34 Ost 76891 vicinity of Kijewskoje
35	29 April 1943	08:52	Yak-1	PQ 34 Ost 85124 northeast of Sorin	75	23 July 1943	17:24	Il-2 m.H.	PQ 34 Ost 76894, east of Kijewskoje vicinity of Kijewskoje
36	29 April 1943	09:09? (Note: According to Mathews and Foreman claimed at 09:03.)	Yak-1	PQ 34 Ost 85142 vicinity of Beregowoj	76	23 July 1943	17:28	Yak-1	PQ 34 Ost 86773, northeast of Kijewskoje northeast of Krymsk
37	29 April 1943	13:20	LaGG-3	PQ 34 Ost 86792, northeast of Mingrelskaja south of Fedorowskaja	77	30 July 1943	06:41	Yak-1	PQ 34 Ost 76894, east of Kijewskojevicinity of Krymsk
38	30 April 1943	10:22	Yak-1	PQ 34 Ost 85153 vicinity of Abinsk	78	30 July 1943	10:43	Yak-1	PQ 34 Ost 75234, west of Kijewskojevicinity of Kijewskoje
39	4 May 1943	15:00	Yak-1	PQ 34 Ost 75442, west of Gelendzhik; Black Sea, 15 km (9.3 mi) southwest of Novorossiysk	79	2 August 1943	08:20	Yak-1	PQ 34 Ost 76821 vicinity of Kalabatka
40	5 May 1943	15:35	Yak-1	PQ 34 Ost 75262 south of Krymsk	80	6 August 1943	15:05	Yak-1	PQ 34 Ost 75171, west of Anapa over sea, southwest of Anapa
41	11 May 1943	07:20	Yak-1	PQ 34 Ost 85111 vicinity of Krasshyj Golubowski	81	6 August 1943	15:17	Yak-1	PQ 34 Ost 75494; Black Sea, 10 km (6.2 mi) southwest of Gelendzhik
42	23 May 1943	05:42	P-40	PQ 34 Ost 85281 south of Slavyansk-na-Kubani	82	7 August 1943	06:24? (Note: According to Mathews and Foreman claimed at 06:27.)	Yak-1	PQ 34 Ost 75321 over sea, south of Anapa
43	23 May 1943	05:55	Yak-1	PQ 34 Ost 85343 south of Tscheschskij	83	7 August 1943	06:35	Yak-1	PQ 34 Ost 75392 over sea, southeast of Anapa
44	26 May 1943	11:05	Yak-1	PQ 34 Ost 75231 northwest of Krymsk	84	7 August 1943	06:40	Yak-1	PQ 34 Ost 75612 vicinity of Wassiljewka
45	26 May 1943	13:12	P-39	PQ 34 Ost 85111 vicinity of Krasshyj Golubowski					

== Awards ==
- Iron Cross (1939)
  - 2nd Class
  - 1st Class (19 March 1943)
- Honor Goblet of the Luftwaffe on 25 June 1943 as Feldwebel and pilot
- German Cross in Gold on 23 July 1943 as Feldwebel in the 4./Jagdgeschwader 52
- Knight's Cross of the Iron Cross on 31 December 1943 as Fahnenjunker-Oberfeldwebel and pilot in the 4./Jagdgeschwader 52 (Note: According to Scherzer as Oberfeldwebel and pilot in the II./Jagdgeschwader 52.)
