= Olsberg, Germany =

Olsberg
- Town
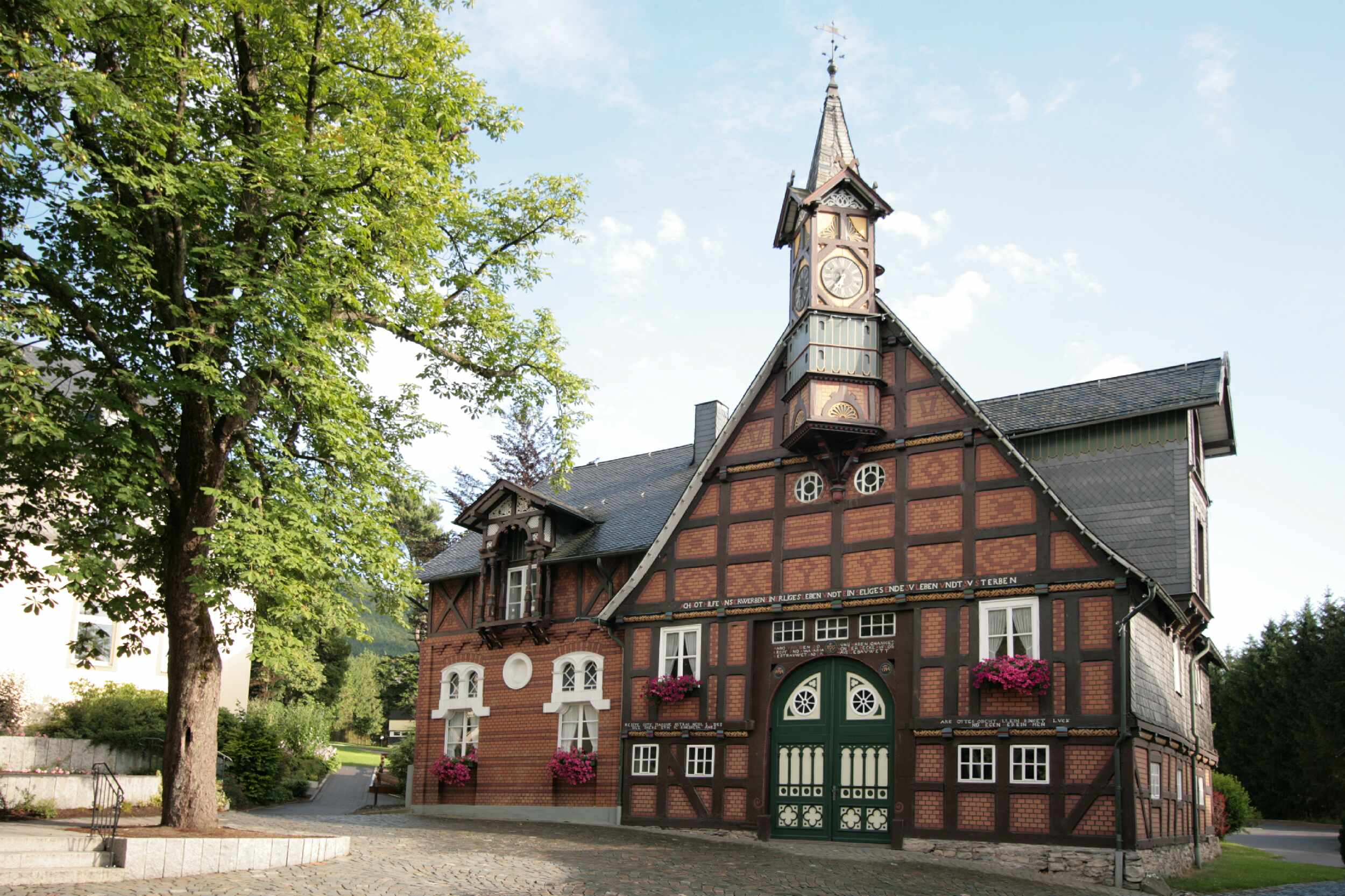
- Kroppsches Haus in Olsberg

- Flag Coat of arms

- Location of Olsberg within Hochsauerlandkreis district
- Interactive map of Olsberg
- Location within Germany Location within North Rhine-Westphalia
- Coordinates: 51°21′N 8°29′E
- Country: Germany
- State: North Rhine-Westphalia
- Admin. region: Arnsberg
- District: Hochsauerlandkreis
- Subdivisions: 15

Government
  - Mayor (2020–25): Wolfgang Fischer (CDU)

Area
  - Total: 118 km^{2} (46 sq mi)
- Elevation: 313–843 m (1,027–2,766 ft)

Population (2025-12-31)
  - Total: 20,930
  - Density: 177/km^{2} (459/sq mi)
- Time zone: UTC+01:00 (CET)
  - Summer (DST): UTC+02:00 (CEST)
- Postal codes: 59939
- Dialling codes: 02962
- Vehicle registration: HSK
- Website: www.olsberg.de

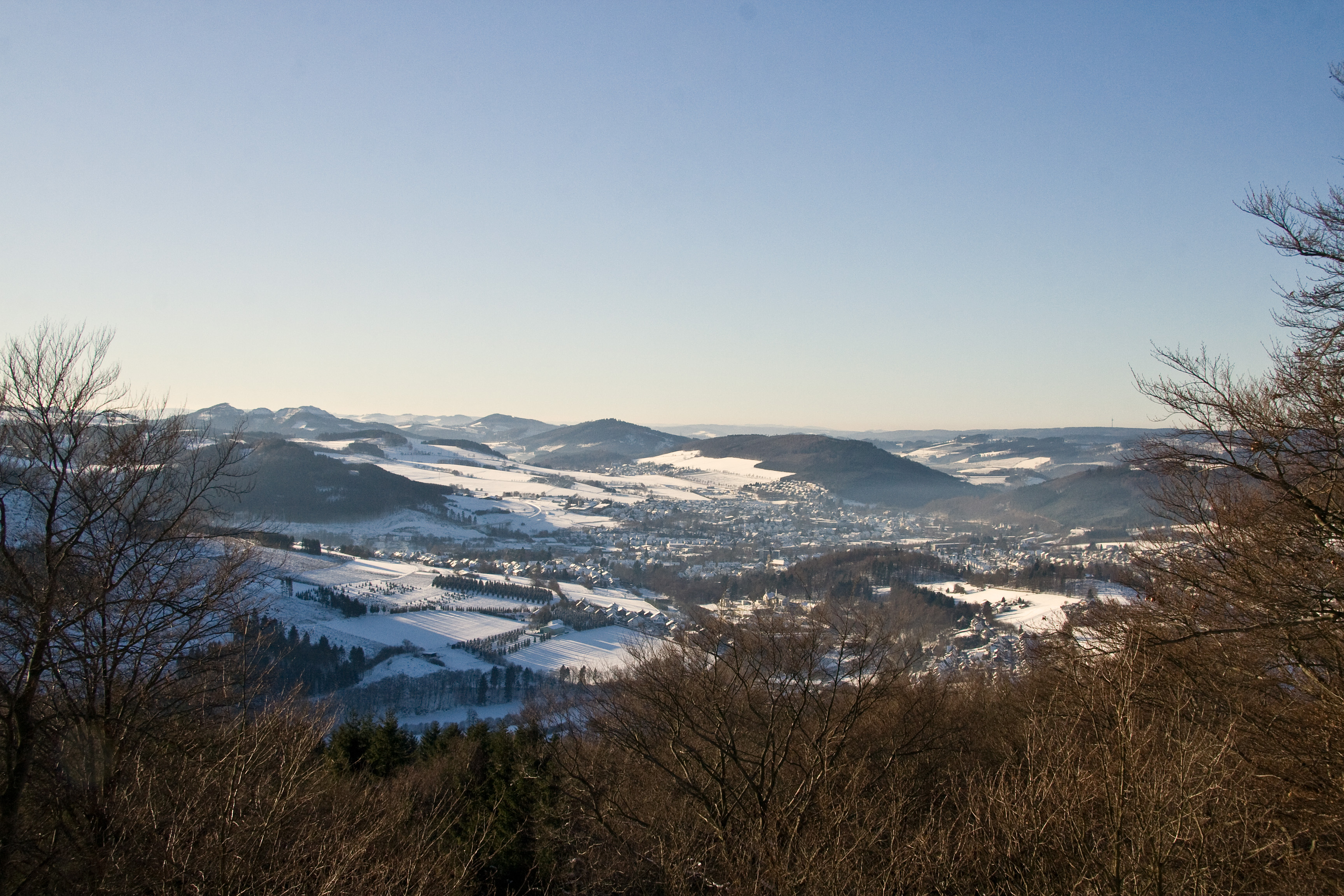
View of Olsberg and Bigge

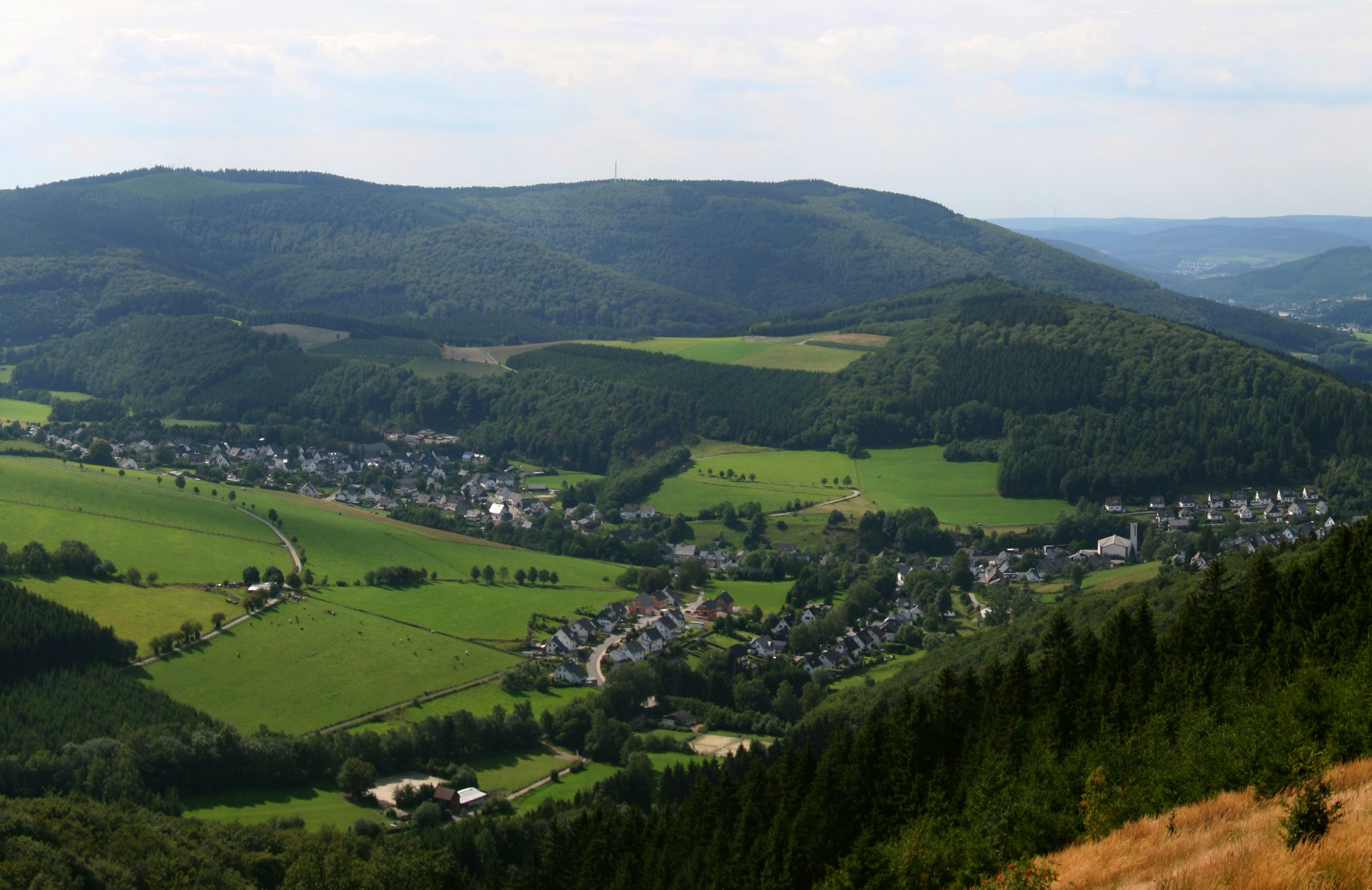
view of Ginsterkopf and Elleringhausen

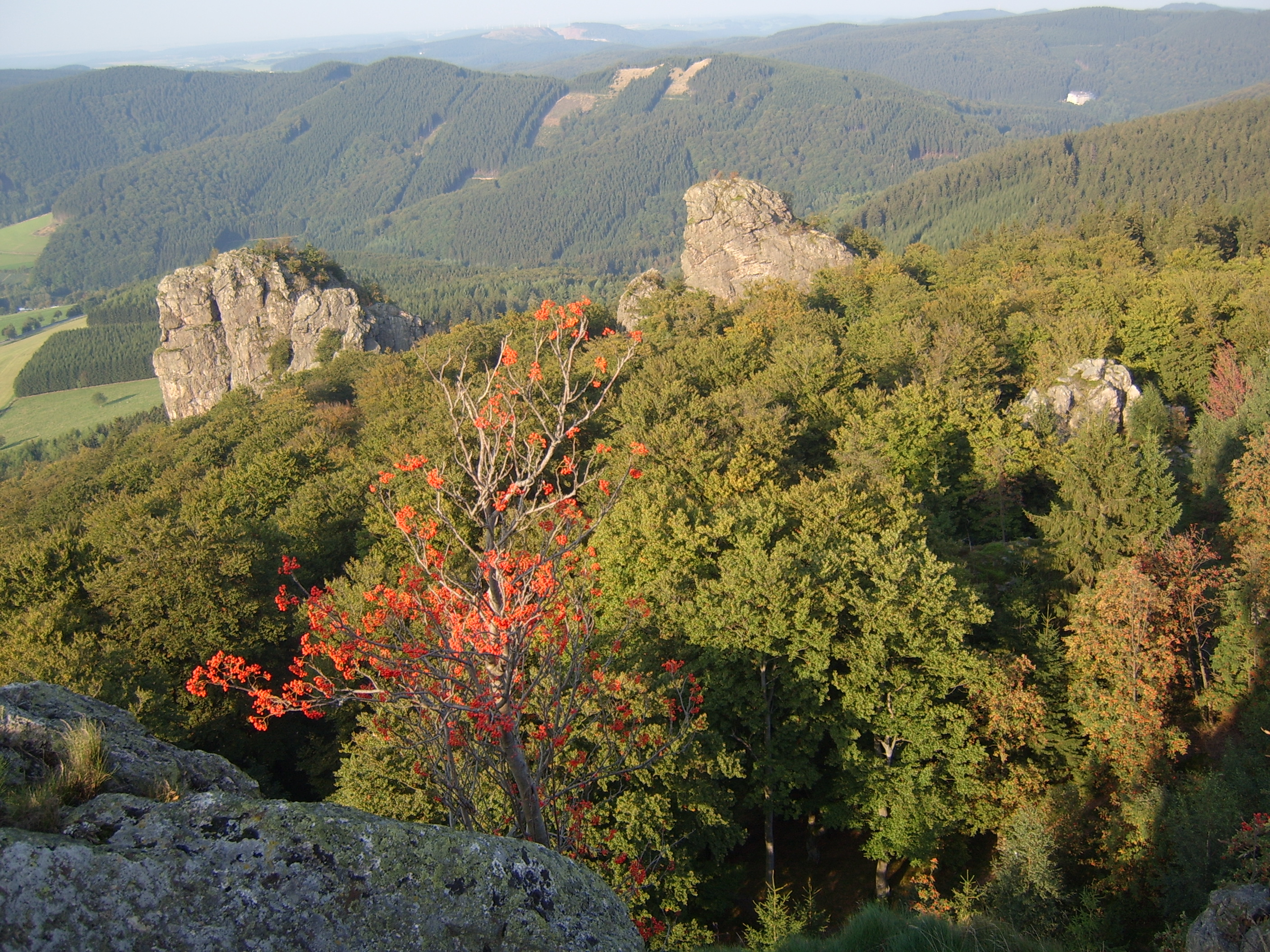
Bruchhauser Steine

Olsberg (German pronunciation: [ˈɔlsbɛʁk]) is a town in the Hochsauerland district, in North Rhine-Westphalia, Germany.

== Geography ==
It is situated on the river Ruhr, approx. 15 km east of Meschede. It is bordered by Arnsberg Forest Nature Park, on the northern fringe of the Rothaargebirge. The town's setting is dominated by heavily wooded ridges and valleys formed by the Ruhr and three of its tributaries.

A notable feature situated within the town's limits are the Bruchhauser Steine, four large porphyry rocks located on a mountain near the village of Bruchhausen.

The Langenberg, the highest mountain of north-west Germany and North Rhine-Westphalia, is located on the eastern town border, the peak being just inside the town's limits.

=== Neighbouring towns and municipalities ===
Clockwise from the north, Olsberg is bordered by:

- Brilon
- Willingen
- Winterberg
- Schmallenberg
- Bestwig

=== Division of the town ===
The town of Olsberg comprises twelve villages. The town's core consists of Olsberg itself and Bigge, which have physically merged since the 1950s.

- Antfeld
- Assinghausen
- Bigge
- Olsberg
- Bruchhausen
- Brunskappel
- Elleringhausen
- Elpe/Heinrichsdorf
- Gevelinghausen
- Helmeringhausen
- Wiemeringhausen
- Wulmeringhausen

== History ==
The town was formed on January 1, 1975, in the course of the municipal reorganization of North Rhine-Westphalia. Before that date all villages (except Bigge and Olsberg, which had been merged already been merged into a single municipality in 1969) have been independent municipalities. On 23 June 2014, a Learjet 35 and a Eurofighter Typhoon collided over the city. Both people on board the Learjet died, while the pilot on the Typhoon survived.

== Population ==
Historical population

Year	Pop.	±% p.a.
1965	13,485	—
1970	13,801	+0.46%
1975	14,119	+0.46%
1980	14,200	+0.11%
1985	14,232	+0.05%
1990	15,227	+1.36%
1995	16,267	+1.33%

Year	Pop.	±% p.a.
2000	16,195	−0.09%
2005	15,803	−0.49%
2010	15,102	−0.90%
2015	14,874	−0.30%
2020	14,432	−0.60%
2025	14,596	+0.23%

Source: Landesdatabank Nordrhein-Westfalen

== Politics ==
The town council is currently headed by mayor Wolfgang Fischer (CDU), re-elected in 2020. The composition of the town council is, since 2020:

Party	Seats
CDU	16
SPD	9
Green	4
FDP	2
Left	1

== Economy ==
Traditionally dominated by agriculture (especially dairy farming) and small scale wood and metal craft, the town's economical base today relies on the tertiary sector, especially tourism. Industry consists primarily of metallurgy and sawmills.

== Transport ==
=== Rail ===
The town has two train stations.

- Olsberg railway station is situated on the railway line between Hagen and Kassel and receives a generally hourly service in both direction.
- Bigge railway station is on the line between Dortmund and Winterberg and has a one train in each direction every two hours.

=== Bus ===
Buses connect the town core to the neighbouring villages and towns, generally with hourly services. Most bus services meet at Olsberg railway station to connect with train services.

=== Road ===
The Bundesstraße 480 runs through the town from north to south, and meets the Bundesstraße 7 just north of the town in the village of Altenbüren. The current end of the A46 motorway is 5 km to the Northwest.

==== Town bypass ====
Construction on a southern bypass road started in 2005 and is scheduled for opening in 2010. It will take the Bundesstrasse 480 to a new route bypassing the town core to the west and the south.

== Education ==
Children are allocated to four primary schools according to their place of residence. Additionally there are three secondary schools, one of which caters for children with physical disabilities. While the town does not have a Gymnasium (higher education school), it maintains a vocational college.

== International relations ==
Olsberg is twinned with:

- Olsberg, Canton of Aargau (Switzerland) -- since 1974
- Fruges (France) -- since 1965
- Jöhstadt (Germany) -- since 1990

== See also ==
- 2014 Olsberg mid-air collision
