= George Philip Chamberlain =

RAF Officer

CB OBE George Philip Chamberlain
- Born: August 18, 1905; Enville, Staffordshire, England
- Died: November 2, 1995 (aged 90)
- Allegiance: United Kingdom
- Branch: Royal Air Force
- Rank: Air Vice-Marshal
- Commands: Royal Air Force

George Philip Chamberlain CB OBE (18 August 1905, in Enville, Staffordshire – 2 November 1995) was an Air Vice-Marshal in the Royal Air Force.
