= Nörvenich Air Base =

Nörvenich Air Base Advanced Landing Ground Y-58
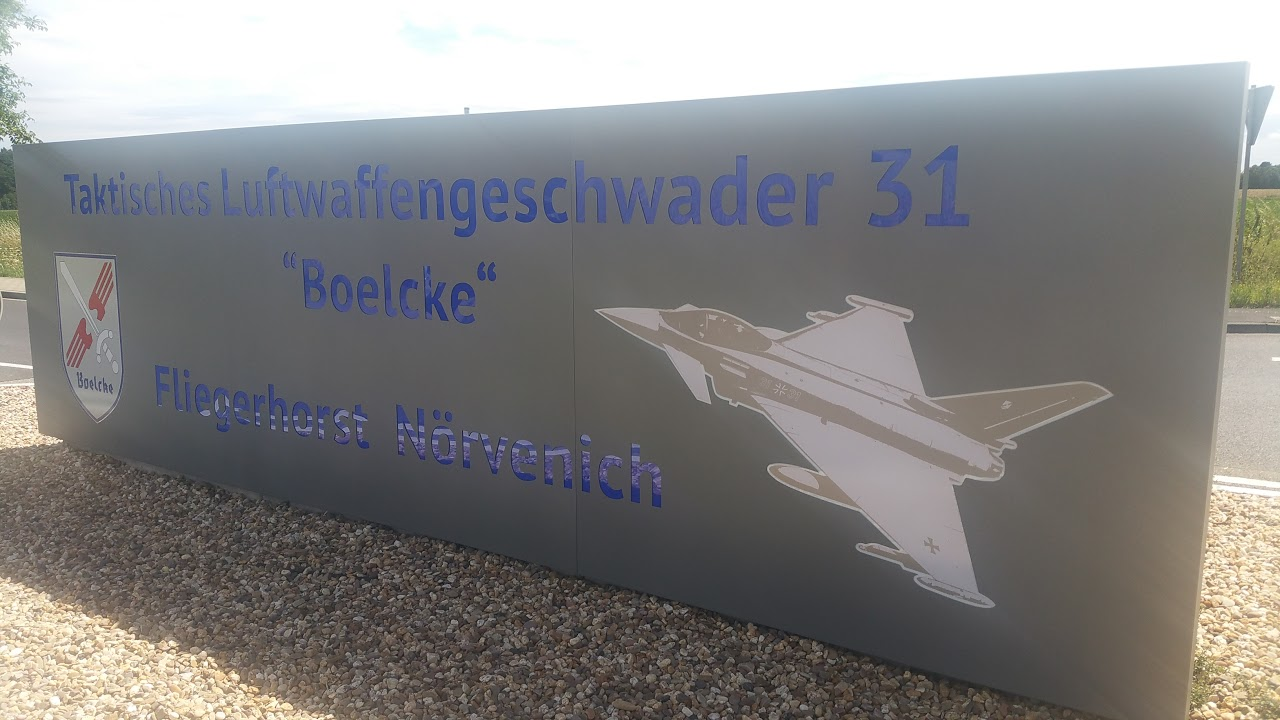
- IATA: none; ICAO: ETNN

Summary
- Airport type: Military
- Location: Nörvenich, Germany
- Elevation AMSL: 382 ft (116 m)
- Coordinates: 50°49′54″N 006°39′30″E
- Website: FNörvenich Air Base

Map
- Location within Germany

Runways
Direction	Length		Surface
Direction	ft	m	Surface
06/24	8,048	2,439	ASP

Nörvenich Air Base (Fliegerhorst Nörvenich) is a German Air Force air base in Nörvenich, North Rhine-Westphalia, Germany (ICAO: ETNN). It has been the home of Taktisches Luftwaffengeschwader 31 "Boelcke", which flies the Eurofighter Typhoon. Since 2023, Tactical Air Force Wing 33 from Büchel Air Base, the sole remaining German base with nuclear weapons, has been exercising at Nörvenich Air Base, while Büchel´s airfield will be renovated to accommodate the new F-35 jets by 2026.

== History ==
Nörvenich Air Base was built in Nörvenich, near Düren, North Rhine-Westphalia for the RAF Germany in 1952 and opened in August 1954. In 1958, Jagdbombergeschwader 31 (Fighter-Bomber Wing 31; abbreviated as: JaBoG 31) based at Nörvenich, was the first German fighter-bomber wing to use the U.S.-built Republic F-84F Thunderstreak of the United States Air Force. In January 1959, this squadron was the first German Air Force wing to be assigned to NATO. In 1961, it was the first wing to use Lockheed F-104 Starfighters. The first "Tornado" (Panavia PA 200) started in July 1983 from the air base. Since June 2010, the squadron has been flying Eurofighter Typhoons.

From Aug 12, 1977 to Aug 27, 1977, exercise 'Coronet Poker' saw 18 F-105s from the USAFR's 301TFW deploy to the base. Thirteen Thunderstick II F-105Ds and one F-105F came from the 457th TFS, based at Carswell Air Force Base, Texas. Three standard F-105Ds and one F-105F were contributed by the 465th TFS, from Tinker AFB, OK.

=== 21st century ===
During 17 to 28 August 2020, the Israeli Air Force made a historic fighter deployment when six F-16C/D Fighting Falcon “Barak” fighter jets operated from the base, taking part in Exercise Blue Wings 2020 with the resident Taktisches Luftwaffengeschwader 31 and their Eurofighters. This marked the first time in history Israeli combat aircraft had landed in Germany.

As of 2023, Tactical Air Force Wing 33 from Büchel Air Base, the sole remaining German base with nuclear weapons, is exercising at Nörvenich Air Base, while Büchel´s airfield will be renovated to accommodate the new F-35 jets by 2026, at a cost of 10 billion €.
