= Walter Krupinski =

German general and fighter pilot during World War II (1920–2000)

- Walter Krupinski
- Born: 11 November 1920; Domnau, East Prussia
- Died: 7 October 2000 (aged 79); Neunkirchen-Seelscheid
- Military career
- Allegiance: Nazi Germany (to 1945); West Germany
- Branch: Luftwaffe; German Air Force
- Service years: 1939–1945; 1955–1976
- Rank: Hauptmann (Wehrmacht); Generalleutnant (Bundeswehr)
- Nicknames: Graf Punski, The Count
- Units: JG 52, JG 5, JG 11 and JV 44
- Commands: 7./JG 52, 1./JG 5, II./JG 11, III./JG 26; JaBoG 33
- Conflicts: See battles World War II: Eastern Front; Operation Barbarossa; Western Front; Invasion of Normandy; Defense of the Reich; Operation Bodenplatte
- Awards: Knight's Cross of the Iron Cross with Oak Leaves

Walter Krupinski (11 November 1920 – 7 October 2000) was a German Luftwaffe fighter ace in World War II and a senior West German Air Force officer during the Cold War. He was one of the highest-scoring pilots in the war, credited with 197 victories in 1,100 sorties. He was called by his fellow pilots Graf Punski (Count Punski) due to his Prussian origins. Krupinski was one of the first to fly the Messerschmitt Me 262 jet fighter in combat as a member of Jagdverband 44 (JV 44—44th Fighter Detachment) led by Adolf Galland.

Born in the Weimar Republic in 1920, Krupinski joined the Luftwaffe in 1939 and completed his flight training in 1940. Flying with Jagdgeschwader 52 (JG 52–52nd Fighter Wing), he claimed his first victory in August 1941 and his total rose steadily against Soviet Air Forces. In October 1942, Krupinski was awarded the Knight's Cross of the Iron Cross and was appointed squadron leader of 7. Staffel (7th squadron) of JG 52 in March 1943. Krupinski was awarded the Knight's Cross of the Iron Cross with Oak Leaves for 174 aerial victories. He was then transferred, serving with Jagdgeschwader 5 (JG 5—5th Fighter Wing) and was then given command of II. Gruppe (2nd group) of Jagdgeschwader 11 (JG 11—11th Fighter Wing) in 1944. Wounded in a flight accident in August, he commanded III. Gruppe of Jagdgeschwader 26 "Schlageter" (JG 26—26th Fighter Wing) following his convalescence in September. He finished the war serving with JV 44, flying the Me 262, and surrendered to the Western Allies in May 1945.

After the war, Krupinski joined the German Air Force of the Bundeswehr, serving until 1976 when he was forced into early retirement. Krupinski died in Neunkirchen-Seelscheid on 7 October 2000.

== Childhood, education and early career ==
Krupinski was born on 11 November 1920, in the town of Domnau in the Province of East Prussia, and grew up in Braunsberg, present-day Braniewo, Poland. He was the first son of Friedrich Wilhelm Krupinski, a Obergerichtsvollzieher (bailiff), and his wife Auguste, née Helmke. His two younger brothers were Paul and Günther. Paul joined the Kriegsmarine and entered the U-boat service, and was killed in action on 11 November 1944 while serving on U-771 as an Oberleutnant zur See (first lieutenant), which was sunk off the Norwegian coast by the British submarine HMS Venturer.

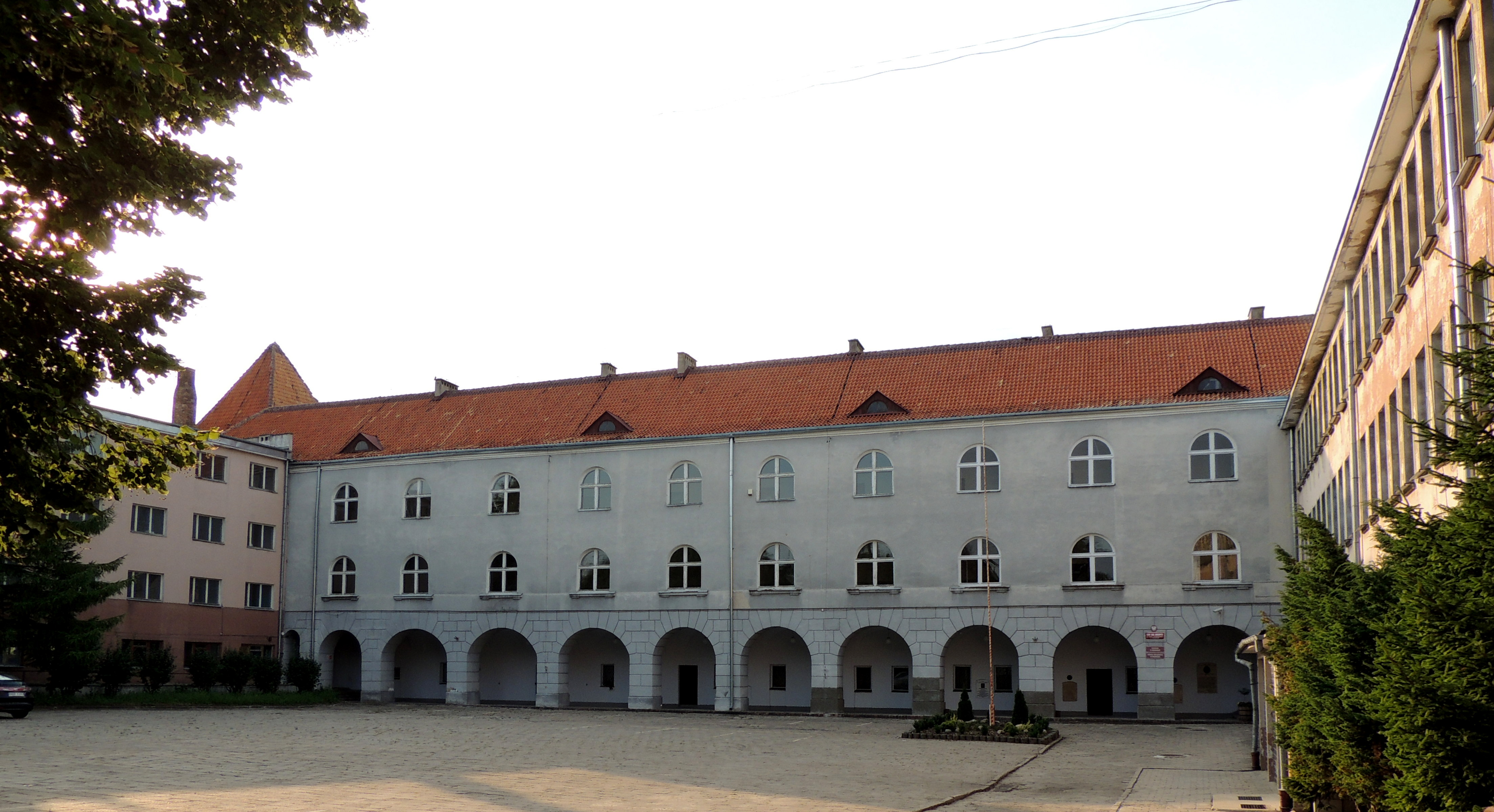
Courtyard Lyceum Hosianum, today a vocational school

When the naval branch of Hitler Youth in Braunsberg was founded in 1936, Krupinski joined the organization. There, he received nautical training and went on cruises, making him eligible for a nautical patent. That year, he also met Ilse Hartung, a doctor’s daughter, at a dance class whom he married in 1944. On 21 March 1939, Krupinski graduated with his Abitur (diploma) from the Lyceum Hosianum in Braunsberg. On 1 April 1939, Krupinski started his compulsory Reichsarbeitsdienst (Reich Labour Service) in Freystadt, present-day Kisielice.

On 1 October, Krupinski joined the military and received his basic training with Fliegerausbildungs-Regiment 10 (10th Aviators Training Regiment) based in Neukuhren, present-day Pionersky, as a Fahnenjunker (ensign). After six weeks of basic training, he was posted to the Luftkriegsschule 2 (Air War School 2). Krupinski made his maiden flight on 9 November. (Note: Flight training in the Luftwaffe progressed through the levels A1, A2 and B1, B2, referred to as A/B flight training. A training included theoretical and practical training in aerobatics, navigation, long-distance flights and dead-stick landings. The B courses included high-altitude flights, instrument flights, night landings and training to handle the aircraft in difficult situations.) Over the next nine months, he learned to fly the Focke-Wulf Fw 44, Heinkel He 72 and then the twin-engine Fw 58. He was taught blind flying on the Junkers W 34. He also flew the Arado Ar 65 and Ar 66, Bücker Bü 131 and Bü 133, the Fieseler Fi 156 Storch, the Fw 56, the Gotha Go 145, the Heinkel He 46, the He 51 and the Henschel Hs 123. On 24 June 1940, Krupinski received his B2 pilot license.

Following two weeks of vacation, Krupinski completed his training at Jagdfliegerschule 5 (5th fighter pilot school) in Wien-Schwechat to which he was posted on 1 July 1940. Jagdfliegerschule 5 at the time was under the command of the World War I flying ace and recipient of the Pour le Mérite Eduard Ritter von Schleich. One of his course mates was Hans-Joachim Marseille, who had been posted to the Jagdfliegerschule 5 in late 1939 but had not yet graduated out of disciplinary reasons. His three-roommates at the school were Walter Nowotny, Paul Galland, the brother of Adolf Galland, and Peter Göring, a nephew of the Reichsmarschall (Empire Marshal) Hermann Göring.

== World War II ==
After completing his flight training at Jagdfliegerschule 5, Krupinski was sent to Ergänzungsjagdgruppe Merseburg, a supplementary training unit based in Merseburg, on 1 October 1940. On 15 October, he was then posted to the Ergänzungsstaffel (training squadron) of Jagdgeschwader 52 (JG 52—52nd Fighter Wing). The Ergänzungsstaffel was headed by Oberleutnant Werner Lederer and based at Krefeld Airfield where the pilots received further training flying the Messerschmitt Bf 109 E. At Merseburg, Krupinski met and befriended Gerhard Barkhorn and Willi Nemitz. On 13 May 1940, for his service he was awarded the Iron Cross 2nd Class (Eisernes Kreuz zweiter Klasse).

On 1 February 1941, Krupinski was transferred to 6. Staffel. (Note: For an explanation of Luftwaffe unit designations see Organization of the Luftwaffe during World War II.) 6. Staffel at the time was under the command of Staffelkapitän (squadron leader) Rudolf Resch. Resch later gave Krupinski the nickname "Graf Punski" ("Count Punski") or sometimes just "Der Graf" ("The Count"). The nickname had its origins in a late-night conversation between Krupinski and Resch. His father was a professor of Slavic studies in Dresden. When Krupinski tried to explain his East Prussian origin, Resch informed him that the ending in "-ski" or "-zky" denoted a landowner, or that it indicated a Freiherr ("free lord"), and thus the lowest level in the medieval noble hierarchy in the East. The witty banter which then followed, led at first in his squadron, then in his group and eventually in the entire German fighter force to his nickname which stuck with for the rest of his life. His Staffel was subordinated to II. Gruppe of JG 52 which was headed by Hauptmann Erich Woitke.

=== Operation Barbarossa ===
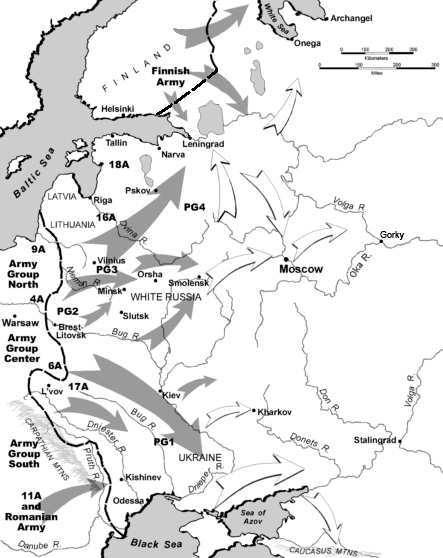
Map indicating Operation Barbarossa's attack plan

In preparation of Operation Barbarossa, the German invasion of the Soviet Union launched on 22 June 1941, II. Gruppe of JG 52, without a period of replenishment in Germany, was ordered to airfields close to the German-Soviet demarcation line. While the Gruppenstab (group headquarters unit) and 4. Staffel were based at Suwałki in northeastern Poland, 5. and 6. Staffel were transferred to a forward airfield at Sobolewo. For the invasion, II. Gruppe of JG 52 was subordinated to the Geschwaderstab (headquarters unit) of Jagdgeschwader 27 (JG 27—27th Fighter Wing). The Geschwader was part of the VIII. Fliegerkorps commanded by Generaloberst Wolfram Freiherr von Richthofen which supported the northern wing of Army Group Centre.

II. Gruppe was ordered to relocate to Soltsy, 30 kilometers (19 miles) west of Lake Ilmen, on 5 August in support of the 16th Army and Army Group North. Here, the Gruppe supported the fighting south of Lake Ilmen, and the German attacks on Shlisselburg, Leningrad and the Soviet fleet at Kronstadt. On 16 August, Krupinski claimed his first aerial victory. At 05:48, he shot down an I-18 fighter, an alternative Luftwaffe name for a Mikoyan-Gurevich MiG-1, north of Shimsk. Since German forces had reached the proximity of Leningrad, II. Gruppe was ordered to Lyuban on 1 September, approximately 70 kilometers (43 miles) to Leningrad and located on the road to Moscow. The Gruppe stayed at Lyuban until 30 September, flying missions to Shlisselburg, Leningrad and Mga. Fighting in this combat area, Krupinski claimed an Ilyushin DB-3 bomber on 17 September and a Polikarpov I-153 fighter on 21 September.

On 2 October, German forces launched Operation Typhoon, the failed strategic offensive to capture Moscow. In support of this offensive, II. Gruppe was moved to Stabna, located just north of Smolensk. Operating from Stabna, Krupinski shot down a Tupolev SB near Kholm fighter on 4 October. On 12 October, II. Gruppe was ordered to Novodugino where it stayed for four days. The Gruppe then moved to an airfield west of Kalinin, present-day Tver, on 16 October. The following day, Krupinski claimed his fifth aerial victory over an I-18 fighter. The Gruppe relocated to an airfield southeast of Kalinin on 22 October. The next day, Krupinski claimed a Polikarpov R-5 reconnaissance bomber shot down. On 4 November, II. Gruppe had moved to Ruza. There, Krupinski claimed his last aerial victory during Operation Barbarossa on 28 November when he shot down an Ilyushin Il-2 ground attack aircraft near Solnechnogorsk. On 30 November, II. Gruppe moved to Klin located 85 kilometers (53 miles) northwest of Moscow. While Soviet forces retook Klin on 15 December, Krupinski had been sent to Insterburg on 13 December. Woitke had tasked him with organizing transportation of vital technical equipment to the Gruppe.

=== Eastern Front ===
In late January 1942, II. Gruppe was withdrawn from the Eastern Front and sent to Jesau near Königsberg for a period of recuperation and replenishment, arriving on 24 January 1942. In Jesau, the Gruppe received many factory new Bf 109 F-4 aircraft. On 14 April, II. Gruppe received orders to move to Pilsen, present-day Plzeň in the Czech Republic, for relocation to the Eastern Front. The Gruppe had also received a new commander, Woitke had been transferred and was replaced by Hauptmann Johannes Steinhoff. Following his home leave, Krupinski had rejoined his unit at Jesau. The Gruppe then moved to Wien-Schwechat on 24 April before flying to Zürichtal, present-day Solote Pole, a village near the urban settlement Kirovske in the Crimea. There, II. Gruppe participated in Operation Trappenjagd, a German counterattack during the Battle of the Kerch Peninsula, launched on 8 May.

II./JG 52 insignia

Following a series of relocations, including a short deployment on the Crimea, the Gruppe was then ordered to the airfield named Kharkov-Waitschenko on 14 May and participated in the Second Battle of Kharkov. On 16 May, the Gruppe again relocated moving to Artyomovsk, present-day Bakhmut, where they stayed until 23 May supporting German forces fighting in the Second Battle of Kharkov. On 23 May, the Gruppe was ordered to relocate to Barvinkove. On 1 June, II. Gruppe moved to an airfield at Grakowo, located approximately halfway between Kharkov and Kupiansk. The main German objectives in that combat area were, breakthrough to the upper Don and capture of Voronezh. There, Krupinski claimed his first aerial victory in 1942 when he shot down a MiG-1 fighter northwest of Kupiansk on 4 June. The Gruppe stayed at Grakowo until 26 June when it moved to Bilyi Kolodiaz. During this period, Krupinski claimed further aerial victories, a Lavochkin-Gorbunov-Gudkov LaGG-3 fighter on 5, 14 and 24 June each, and a MiG-1 on 22 June, taking his total to twelve.

On 28 June, the Wehrmacht initiated Fall Blau (Case Blue), the 1942 strategic summer offensive in southern Russia. The objective was to secure the oil fields of Baku as well as an advance in the direction of Stalingrad along the Volga River, to cover the flanks of the advance towards Baku. Tasked with aerial support of this offensive was Luftflotte 4 (Air Fleet 4) to which JG 52 was subordinated. Following the German advance, Krupisnki had increased his number of aerial victories to twenty by the end of July. On 20 August, II. Gruppe reached the airfield at Tusov, approximately 25 kilometers (16 miles) southwest of Kalach-na-Donu on the western bank of the Don, from where the Gruppe operated in the combat area of Stalingrad. Flying from this airfield, Krupinski's number of aerial victories increased to 31 by end of August.

In September 1942, II. Gruppe was ordered into the Battle of the Caucasus, supporting Army Group South on the front over the Caucasus. Opposing it was the 4th and 5th Air Armies of the Red Air Force. The Gruppe reached an airfield named Gonschtakowka located north-northeast of Mozdok on the Terek on 6 September. On 25 July 1942, the Staffelkapitän of 4. Staffel, Oberleutnant Barkhorn, his friend from Merseburg, had been injured in combat. During his convalescence, Barkhorn was temporarily replaced by Leutnant Waldemar Semelka who was killed in action on 21 August. Command was then given to Leutnant Otto Leicher who was also killed in action. In consequence, Krupinski was transferred, taking command of 4. Staffel from 10 to 30 September when Barkhorn returned. During his tenure with 4. Staffel, Krupinski had to bail out of his Bf 109 G-2 (Werknummer 13537—factory number) due to engine failure on 17 September. Fighting in the North Caucasus region in September, Krupinski increased his number of aerial victories to 47.

Following his 50th aerial victory, Krupinski was awarded the Honor Goblet of the Luftwaffe (Ehrenpokal der Luftwaffe) on 13 September 1942. On 25 October, his Bf 109 G-2 (Werknummer 13861) was severely damaged in aerial combat resulting in a forced landing destroying the aircraft at the airfield near Soldatskaya, approximately 15 kilometers (9.3 miles) north-northwest of Prokhladny. Two days later, he received the German Cross in Gold (Deutsches Kreuz in Gold). By end October, Krupinski increased his number of aerial victories to 59. On 29 October 1942, Krupinski and Leutnant Rudolf Miethig from 3. Staffel were awarded the Knight's Cross of the Iron Cross (Ritterkreuz des Eisernes Kreuzes).

While Soviet forces launched Operation Uranus, the operation which led to the encirclement of Axis forces in the vicinity of Stalingrad, Krupinski was in a hospital at Maykop and had his synovial bursa removed following an injury sustained to knee. He was then flown to Liegnitz, present-day Legnica, for further treatment. On 12 December, he was met by his future wife Ilse Hartung in Berlin and the couple continued their voyage to Braunsberg. In January 1943, Krupinski learned that he had been transferred to Ergänzungs-Jagdgruppe Ost, a supplementary training unit for fighter pilots destined for the Eastern Front, as an instructor. At the time, the unit was commanded by Oberstleutnant Hermann Graf and was based at La Leu Airfield near La Rochelle, France.

=== Squadron leader ===
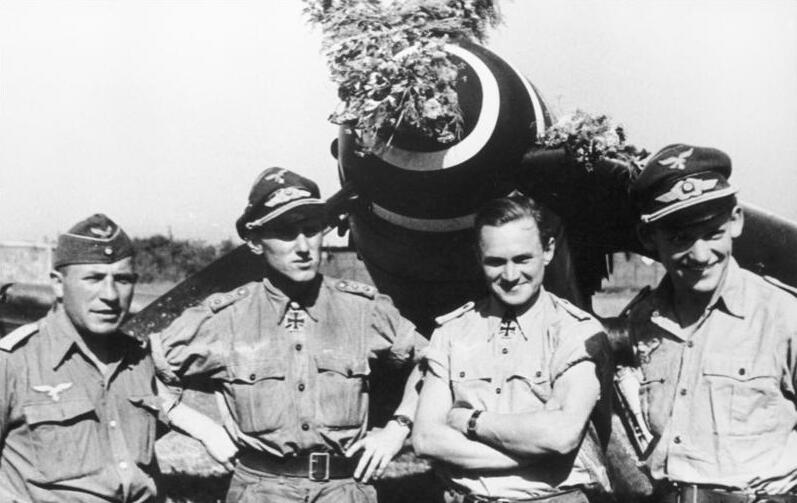
Günther Rall after his 200th aerial victory. Walter Krupinski (second from right) standing to his left.

On 15 March, Krupinski was transferred back to JG 52 where was made Staffelkapitän of 7. Staffel. The Staffel was subordinated to III. Gruppe under the command of Major Hubertus von Bonin. At the time, III. Gruppe was based at an airfield near Kerch and was fighting over the Kuban bridgehead. On 1 April, III. Gruppe moved to Taman where it was headquartered until 2 July. Krupinski claimed his first aerial victory of the year and 67th in total on 2 May when he shot down a Yakovlev Yak-1 fighter southwest of Abinsk Fighting over the Kuban bridgehead, Krupinski's aerial victories increased to 88 claims by the end of June.

JG 52 moved north in preparation for Operation Citadel and the Battle of Kursk. III. Gruppe arrived in Ugrim, located south of Kursk, on 3 July. Hauptmann Günther Rall, who had already served as acting Gruppenkommandeur (group commander) of III. Gruppe in February and March 1943, officially replaced Bonin in this position on 5 July 1943. That day, Krupinski claimed two LaGG-3 fighters shot down but was also severely injured in a landing accident at Ugrim. Krupinski collided with a Bf 109 taking off, causing his Bf 109 G-6 (Werknummer 20062) to flip over, severely injuring him. He had sustained injuries to the head, including lacerations, a fracture of the parietal bone and a rib. After immediate treatment, Krupinski was flown to Heiligenbein, present-day Mamonovo. He was then taken to a hospital at Braunsberg for further convalescence. He returned to his unit on 6 August. During his absence, Leutnant Erich Hartmann, who went on to become the highest scoring fighter pilot of the war, temporarily commanded 7.Staffel.

On 18 August 1943, Krupinski was credited with his 100th aerial victory. He was the 51st Luftwaffe pilot to achieve the century mark. On 24 September, III. Gruppe moved to an airfield located just west of Zaporizhzhia. There, the Gruppe fought over the area between the lower Dnieper and the Crimea during the Battle of the Dnieper. On 29 August, Rall claimed his 200th aerial victory and Generaloberst Otto Deßloch immediately sent him on a lengthy home leave. In consequence, Krupinski was made acting Gruppenkommandeur of III. Gruppe until Rall resumed command on 1 October. There, Krupinski became an "ace-in-a-day" on 10 October when he shot down four LaGG-3 and two Bell P-39 Airacobra fighters.

=== Oak Leaves to the Knight's Cross ===
Following his 174th aerial victory, Krupinski was awarded the Knight's Cross of the Iron Cross with Oak Leaves (Ritterkreuz des Eisernen Kreuzes mit Eichenlaub) on 2 March 1944. He was the 415th member of the German armed forces to be so honored. At the time of the presentation of the Oak Leaves, his number of aerial of victories had increased to 177 claims. In addition, he had also been credited with the destruction of three T-34 tanks on the ground.

Both Krupinski and Hartmann were ordered to the Reichsluftfahrtministerium (Ministry of Aviation) in Berlin for the Oak Leaves presentation. Both arrived in Berlin on 23 March 1944 only to learn that the presentation would be made at the Führerhauptquartier (Führer Headquarter). They were instructed to go the Anhalter Bahnhof where they would take an overnight train to the Führerhauptquartier. Here they met fellow JG 52 pilots Barkhorn, who was to receive the Swords to his Knight's Cross, and Johannes Wiese. Also present were Kurt Bühligen, Horst Ademeit, Reinhard Seiler, Hans-Joachim Jabs, Dr. Maximilian Otte, Bernhard Jope and Hansgeorg Bätcher from the bomber force, and the Flak officer Fritz Petersen, all destined to receive the Oak Leaves. Krupinski assumed that they were heading for the Wolf's Lair in East Prussia but the train was heading for the Berghof in Berchtesgaden. On the train, all of them got drunk on cognac and champagne. Supporting each other and unable to stand, they arrived at Berchtesgaden. Major Nicolaus von Below, Hitler's Luftwaffe adjutant, was shocked. After some sobering up, they were still intoxicated. Hartmann took a German officer's hat from a stand and put it on, but it was too large. Von Below became upset, told Hartmann it was Hitler's and ordered him to put it back.

=== Defense of the Reich ===
On 11 April 1944, the Staffelkapitän of 2. Staffel of Jagdgeschwader 5 (JG 5—5th Fighter Wing), Oberleutnant Edgar Habermann, was killed in action. In consequence, Krupinski was transferred from the Eastern Front to Germany, succeeding Habermann in this capacity. At the time, the squadron is subordinated to I. Gruppe of JG 5, based at Herzogenaurach Airfield and was fighting in Defense of the Reich. The Gruppe was commanded by Major Horst Carganico. Promoted to the rank of Hauptmann (captain) on 1 May 1944, Krupinski was made Gruppenkommandeur of II. Gruppe of Jagdgeschwader 11 (JG 11—11th Fighter Wing). He succeeded Major Rall who had been wounded on 12 May. On 30 May, the United States Army Air Forces (USAAF) targeted German aircraft manufacturing and the Luftwaffe airfields. The Eighth Air Force dispatched 928 heavy bombers and their fighter escort to factories at Dessau, Halberstadt and Oschersleben. In parallel the airfields at Oldenburg and Rotenburg an der Wümme were hit. JG 11 intercepted bombers of the 1st Bombardment Division (1 BD) which targeted German aircraft manufacturing. In this aerial battle, Krupinski claimed two escorting North American P-51 Mustang fighters shot down.

After the Allied invasion of Normandy in June 1944, the Gruppe was moved to Normandy to operate on low-level Army support missions. Krupinski claimed 10 Allied aircraft with JG 11. On 23 July, Krupinski married Ilse Hartung in Braunsberg. The two had known each other since 1936 and at the time were expecting their daughter Carola, born in September 1944. On 12 August, without enemy involvement on a relocation flight, the engine of his Bf 109 G-5 (Werknummer 110244) had exploded in mid-flight near Marburg. Taking to his parachute, he sustained burns to his hands and face, requiring one month of hospitalization. He was replaced by Hauptmann Karl Leonhard as commander of II. Gruppe of JG 11. This was his fifth injury of the war for which he was presented with the Wound Badge in Gold (Verwundetenabzeichen in Gold) in January 1945.

Following his convalescence, he was appointed Gruppenkommandeur of III. Gruppe of Jagdgeschwader 26 "Schlageter" (JG 26—26th Fighter Wing) on 27 September 1944, replacing Klaus Mietusch who had been killed in action on 17 September. At the time, JG 26 was under the command of Oberstleutnant Josef Priller. Caldwell described Krupinski's style of command as too loose. He stated that under his command, III. Gruppe performance as a fighter unit declined. Caldwall attributed this to Krupinski being "weary of the war". On 18 December, Krupinski was involved in an incident that led to the suicide of Oberleutnant Peter Reischer, Staffelkapitän of 11. Staffel. Reischer had led a morning mission which was supposed to take the flight to the combat area over the Ardennes. After the mission, Reischer reported that his flight had attacked Allied armor near Aachen and then had fought an aerial battle. In truth, his flight flew around Lower Saxony, never approaching the combat zone. The lie was revealed by means of the Y-Control System, a radio guidance system, as one of the aircraft was equipped with the FuG16ZY, an airborne transceiver. Krupinski then ordered Reischer to lead a successful second mission or face a court-martial for cowardice. The second mission was inconclusive and upon return, Reischer shot himself.

On 25 March 1945, III. Gruppe of JG 26 was disbanded. Priller, who had been transferred and then held a staff position with the General der Jagdflieger (Inspector of Fighters), had recommended to Krupinski to go to Lechfeld where III. Gruppe of Ergänzungs-Jagdgeschwader 2 (EJG 2—2nd Supplementary Fighter Group) under the command of Oberstleutnant Heinrich Bär was based. EJG 2 was a jet fighter training unit where pilots learned to fly the Messerschmitt Me 262. Krupinski asked Bär if he and his pilots from JG 26 could be trained to fly the Me 262. Due to capacity reasons, Bär had to reject the request and Krupinski headed for the fighter pilot recreation facility at Bad Wiessee.

=== Jagdverband 44 ===
Following the dismissal of Generalleutnant Adolf Galland as General der Jagdflieger, Galland was given the opportunity by Hitler to prove his ideas about the Me 262 jet fighter. He had hoped that the Me 262 would compensate for the numerical superiority of the Allies. In consequence, Galland formed Jagdverband 44 (JV 44—44th Fighter Detachment) at Brandenburg-Briest on 24 February 1945. Galland was also given a carte blanche with respect to staffing and began recruiting his pilots. On 31 March, JV 44 had relocated to Munich-Riem. Galland drove to Bad Wiessee where Krupinski and Barkhorn were recovering. Both pilots accepted Galland's offer and joined JV 44.

At 3:00 pm on 24 April 1945, Krupinski was one of four pilots to take off from Munich-Riem to intercept a USAAF Martin B-26 Marauder aircraft formation. Günther Lützow, who failed to return from this mission, led the flight of four. Lützow's fate remains unknown to this date. Later that day, Krupinski led a flight of Me 262 fighters against Boeing B-17 Flying Fortress bombers. Damaged by the defensive fire of a bomber he believed to have damaged, he then fired at an escorting Republic P-47 Thunderbolt fighter. The two fighters collided and the P-47 fell away. Krupinski did not claim an aerial victory.

=== Prisoner of war ===
On 4 May, JV 44 surrendered to U.S. forces at Maxglan, near Salzburg. Krupinski and other pilots were taken to a makeshift prisoner of war camp near Bad Aibling. Five days later, a U.S. officer was looking for JV 44 pilots and Krupinski, Barkhorn, Erich Hohagen, Karl-Heinz Schnell, and Waldemar Wübke stepped up. The men were then taken to Heidelberg, Wiesbaden-Erbenheim and flown to England for interrogation at the Combined Services Detailed Interrogation Centre at Latimer near London.

In June, Krupinski was taken to Southampton and then with a ship to Cherbourg where he arrived on 6 June. Upon arrival, he was beaten by a French soldier and butted over the head resulting in a fractured skull. The injury was so severe that he was taken to the Luftwaffe hospital at München-Oberföhring and to the US Army Hospital 1022 B at Wasserburg am Inn on 24 July. He was discharged as a prisoner of war on 28 September.

== Later life and service ==
Krupinski was picked up at Wasserburg by his friend Barkhorn who took him home to his family at Tegernsee. There, Krupinski learned that his wife and daughter had found refuge with her oldest sister in Bad Salzschlirf. Since Krupinski was still suffering from his head injury, the family lived off his wife’s income who was working as a waitress for the US garrison at Bad Salzschlirf.

=== Gehlen Organization ===
The former General Reinhard Gehlen had offered his services to the Americans in the end of 1945. Gehlen had served as chief of Fremde Heere Ost (FHO), the German Army's military intelligence unit on the Eastern Front. The Gehlen Organization was in need for people who were familiar with the air war. Krupinski was hired and helped gather information about the armed forces in the Soviet occupation zone until 1953. There are many conflicting or missing bits of information about this stage of Krupinski's life. He had done little to lift this veil of uncertainty.

=== With the German Air Force ===
Krupinski entered the Amt Blank (Blank Agency), named after Theodor Blank, the forerunner of the German Federal Ministry of Defense on 7 April 1953. On 19 November 1955, Krupinski joined the newly created German Air Force, at the time referred to as the Bundesluftwaffe, holding the rank of Major. The first three Bundesluftwaffe pilots to receive jet aircraft training were Johannes Steinhoff, Krupinsk's former group commander during World War II, Dietrich Hrabak and Kurt Kuhlmey. All three of them were trained by the United States Air Force (USAF) in the USA. Krupinski, along with Barkhorn and Herbert Wehnelt, belonged to the second batch of pilots which were sent to England and were trained by the RAF. The three pilots were welcomed by the German ambassador in the UK, Hans von Herwarth. Training began at RAF Feltwell on 19 January 1956 on the Percival Provost, a propeller driven trainer aircraft. The pilots completed their refresher training on 23 March. Krupinski then advanced to the de Havilland Vampire jet aircraft. Krupinski, Barkhorn and Wehnelt complete this training in May 1956. In June, the pilots trained on the Hawker Hunter for ten weeks. On 18 June 1956, Krupinski, Barkhorn and Wehnelt received the RAF aircrew brevet from Air Vice-Marshal George Philip Chamberlain in Stanford Park.

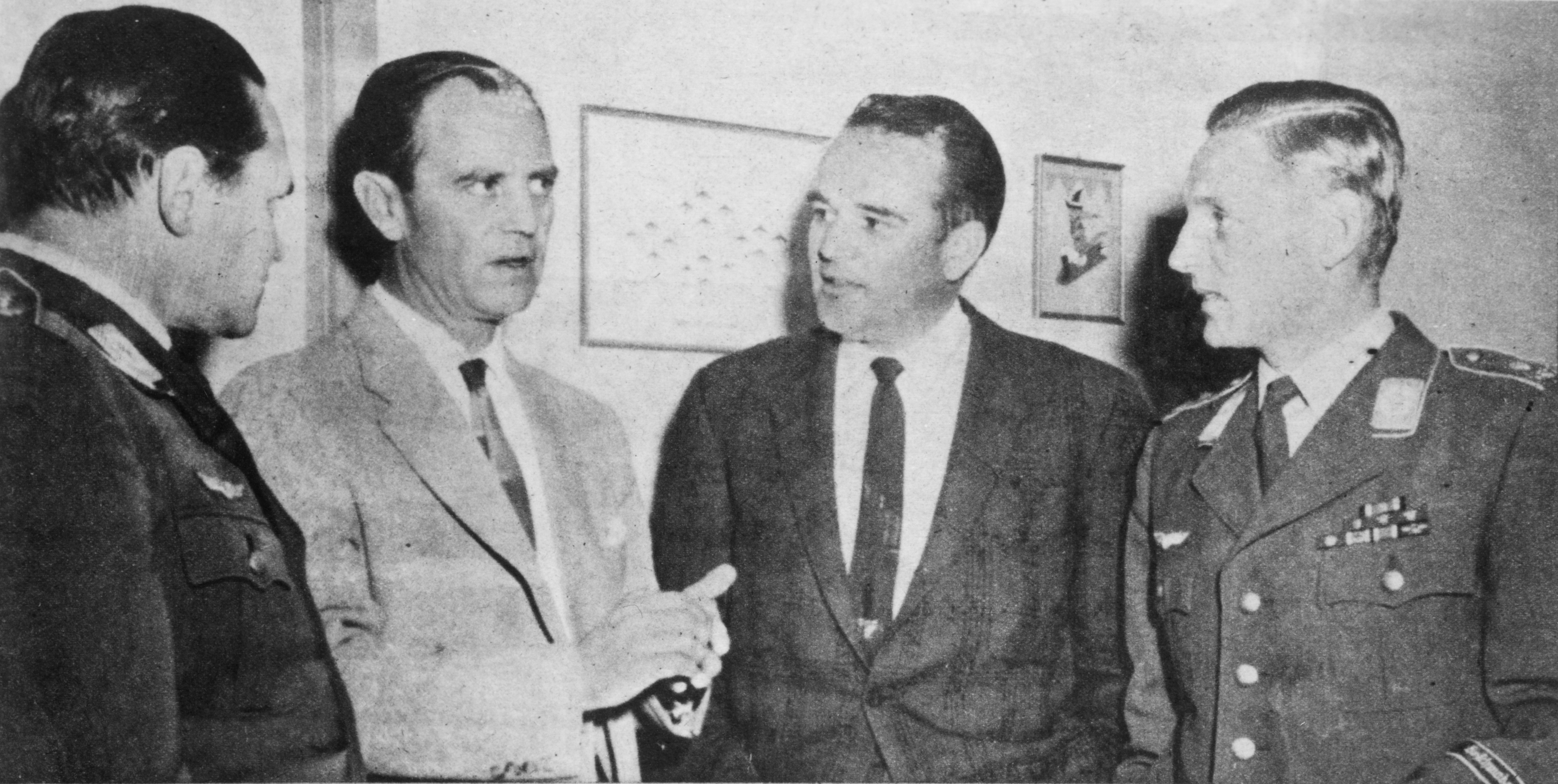
Krupinski (left) and German flying ace Erich Hartmann (right) meeting American flying aces Hubert Zemke (second from left) and Bud Mahurin (1963)

Given the rank of major in 1957, Krupinski went to lead Jagdbombergeschwader 33 (JaBoG 33—Fighter-Bomber Wing 33) the first postwar German jet fighter wing. In 1966 Krupinski took command of the German forces of the Luftwaffen-Ausbildungs-Kommando in Fort Bliss, Texas with the rank of brigadier general. On 19 November 1968, he was appointed Inspector of Aviation Safety, an office within the Luftwaffenamt (Air Force Office). Krupinski held this position until 30 June 1969 when he became commander of the 3rd Luftwaffe division. In 1971 he became chief of staff of Second Allied Tactical Air Force. In October 1974 Krupinski was promoted commanding officer of the airfleet. Due to the Rudel Scandal he was forced into early retirement on 8 November 1976 holding the rank of Generalleutnant (lieutenant-general). Krupinski died in Neunkirchen-Seelscheid on 7 October 2000. He received a military funeral on 11 November with Jörg Kuebart giving a eulogy.

== Summary of career ==
=== Aerial victory claims ===
According to US historian David T. Zabecki, Krupinski was credited with 197 aerial victories. Spick also list Krupinski with 197 aerial victories, claimed in approximately 1,100 combat missions. This figure includes 177 aerial victories claimed over the Eastern Front and 20 in the western theatre of operations and includes one heavy bomber. Mathews and Foreman, authors of Luftwaffe Aces — Biographies and Victory Claims, researched the German Federal Archives and found records for 197 aerial victory claims, plus five further unconfirmed claims. This figure of confirmed claims includes 178 aerial victories on the Eastern Front and 19 on the Western Front, including one four-engined bomber and two victories with the Me 262 jet fighter.

=== Awards ===
- Wound Badge in Gold (January 1945)
- Honor Goblet of the Luftwaffe (Ehrenpokal der Luftwaffe) on 13 September 1942 as Leutnant and pilot (Note: According to Obermaier in May 1942.)
- German Cross in Gold on 27 August 1942 as Leutnant in the 6./Jagdgeschwader 52
- Iron Cross (1939)
  - 2nd Class (13 May 1940)
  - 1st Class (18 September 1941)
- Knight's Cross of the Iron Cross with Oak Leaves
  - Knight's Cross on 29 October 1942 as Leutnant and pilot in the 6./Jagdgeschwader 52
  - 415th Oak Leaves on 2 March 1944 as Oberleutnant and Staffelkapitän of the 7./Jagdgeschwader 52

== Notes ==
Military offices
New creation	Commander of Jagdbombergeschwader 33; 1 October 1958 – 31 December 1962	Succeeded by Oberst Georg Wroblewski
Preceded by Generalmajor Günter Proll	Commander of 3. Luftwaffendivision (Bundeswehr); July 1969 – 30 September 1972	Succeeded by Generalmajor Gerhard Limberg
Preceded by Generalleutnant Herbert Wehnelt	Commanding General of Air Force Forces Command; 1 October 1974 – 9 November 1976	Succeeded by Generalleutnant Bruno Loosen
