= Günther Rall =

German general and fighter pilot during World War II

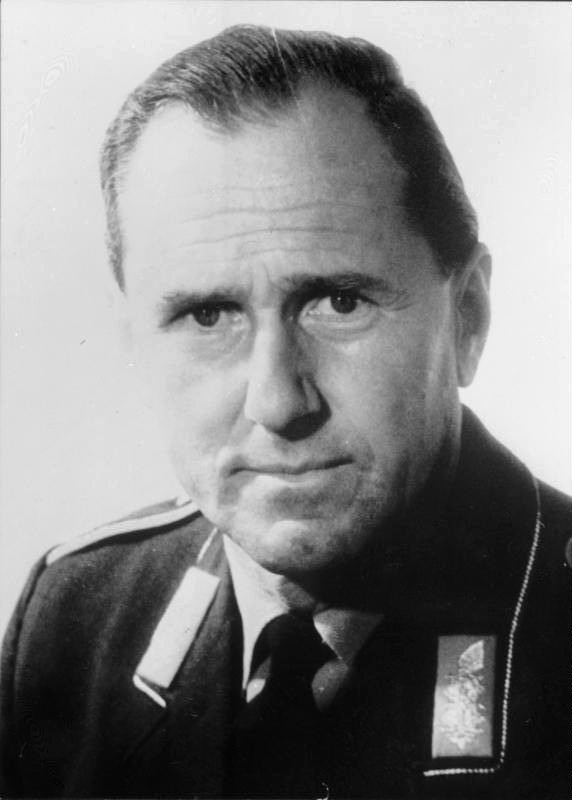
- Rall in the early 1970s
- Born: 10 March 1918; Gaggenau, German Reich
- Died: 4 October 2009 (aged 91); Bad Reichenhall, Germany
- Military career
- Allegiance: Nazi Germany; West Germany
- Branch: Luftwaffe; German Air Force
- Service years: 1936–1945; 1956–1975
- Rank: Major (Wehrmacht); Generalleutnant (Bundeswehr)
- Commands: 8./JG 52, III./JG 52, II./JG 11, JG 300: 3. Luftwaffendivision; 1. Luftwaffendivision
- Wars: See battles World War II: Battle of Britain; Eastern Front; Operation Barbarossa; Operation Blue; Operation Citadel; Crimean Offensive; Defense of the Reich
- Awards: Knight's Cross of the Iron Cross with Oak Leaves and Swords; Order of Merit of the Federal Republic of Germany
- Other work: arms industry consultant

German Representative to the NATO Military Committee
- In office 1974–1975
- Preceded by: Peter von Butler
- Succeeded by: Herbert Trebesch

Inspector of the Air Force
- In office 1971–1974
- Preceded by: Johannes Steinhoff
- Succeeded by: Gerhard Limberg

Günther Rall (10 March 1918 – 4 October 2009) was a highly decorated German military aviator, officer and General, whose military career spanned nearly forty years. Rall was the third most successful fighter pilot in aviation history, behind Gerhard Barkhorn, who is second, and Erich Hartmann, who is first.

Rall was born in Gaggenau, the German Empire, in March 1918. Rall grew up in the Weimar Republic. In 1933 the Nazi Party seized power and Rall, deciding upon a military career, joined the Army in 1936 to train as an infantry soldier. Rall transferred to the Luftwaffe soon after and he qualified as a fighter pilot in 1938. In September 1939 World War II began with the German invasion of Poland. Rall was assigned to Jagdgeschwader 52 (JG 52—52nd Fighter Wing) and flew combat patrols during the Phoney War period on the Western Front. Rall flew combat missions in the Battle of France and Battle of Britain, claiming one enemy aircraft destroyed in May 1940. Rall's wing sustained heavy casualties and the then 22 year old was appointed as a Staffelkapitän (squadron leader). He served in the Balkans Campaign in April and May 1941 without success.

In June 1941, JG 52 moved to the Eastern Front, where it remained from the start of Operation Barbarossa until the end of the war. Rall claimed his first successes in the air defense of Romania. In November 1941, he was shot down, wounded and invalidated from flying for a year. At this time Rall had claimed 36 aerial victories. His achievements earned him the German Cross in Gold in December 1941. Rall returned in August 1942 and was awarded the Knight's Cross of the Iron Cross on 3 September 1942 for 65 enemy aircraft shot down. By 22 October Rall had claimed 100 victories and received the Knight's Cross with Oak Leaves. He reached 200 in late August 1943. On 12 September 1943, he was awarded the Knight's Cross of the Iron Cross with Oak Leaves and Swords, the second highest military award in Nazi Germany at the time of the presentation. By the end of 1943 Rall had achieved over 250 victories, the second flier to do so after Walter Nowotny, who did so in October 1943.

In April 1944, Rall left JG 52 and the Eastern Front. He was given command of II. Gruppe (2nd group) of Jagdgeschwader 11 and served in the Defense of the Reich where he was wounded for a third time. In November 1944, Rall was appointed as an instructor and flew captured Allied fighter aircraft in order to prepare instruction notes on their performance for German fighter pilots. Rall ended the war with an unsuccessful stint commanding Jagdgeschwader 300 (JG 300—300th Fighter Wing) near Salzburg, Austria, where he surrendered in May 1945. During World War II, Rall was credited with the destruction of 275 enemy aircraft in 621 combat missions. He was shot down five times and wounded on three occasions. Rall claimed all of his victories in a Messerschmitt Bf 109, though he also flew the Focke-Wulf Fw 190 operationally. All but three of his claims were against Soviet opposition. Rall joined the West German Air Force in 1956, served as Inspector of the Air Force from 1971 to 1974, and as the German representative to the NATO Military Committee until 1975. After his retirement Rall became a consultant. Among his post-war achievements was the honor of the Order of Merit of the Federal Republic of Germany. It was awarded to him for his post-1945 service.

== Early life and career ==
Rall was born on 10 March 1918 in Gaggenau, at the time in the Grand Duchy of Baden of the German Empire during World War I. He was the second child of merchant Rudolf Rall and his wife Minna, née Heinzelmann. His sister Lotte was four years older than Rall. Rall stated that his father was a member of Der Stahlhelm, Bund der Frontsoldaten (The Steel helmet, League of front-line Soldiers) and had an affiliation with the German National People's Party.

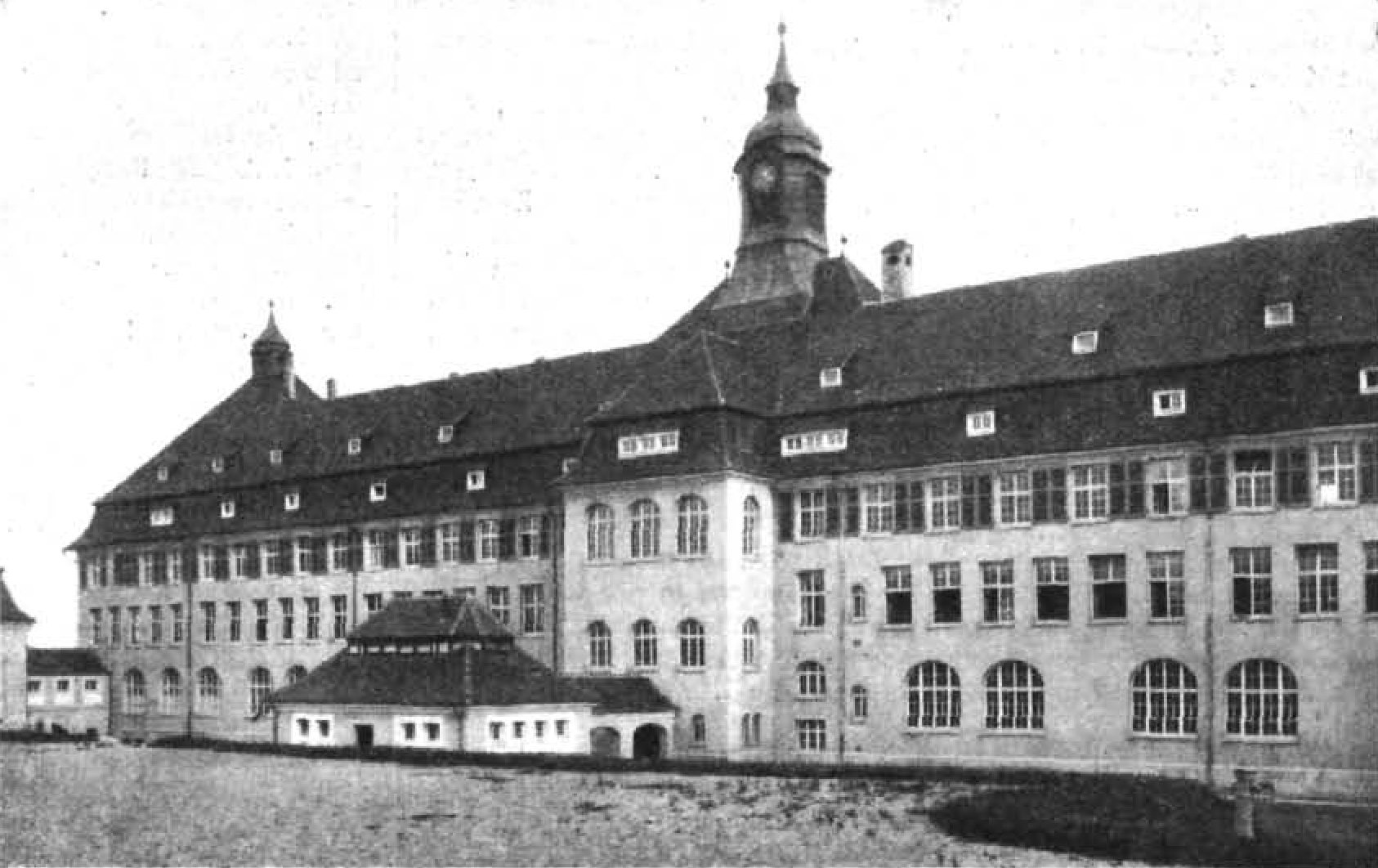
Rall attended the Napola in Backnang

In 1922, the Rall family moved to Stuttgart. There, in 1928, Rall joined the Christian Boy Scouts. In 1934, the Gleichschaltung converted the Christian Boy Scouts into the Deutsches Jungvolk as part of the Hitler Youth. He attended the Volksschule in Stuttgart. For his secondary education, he first attended the humanities-oriented Karls-Gymnasium in Stuttgart. Then in 1935 he transferred to the National Political Institutes of Education (Nationalpolitische Erziehungsanstalt—Napola) in Backnang, a secondary boarding school founded under the recently established Nazi state. The goal of the Napola schools was to raise a new generation for the political, military and administrative leadership of Nazi Germany. There he received his Abitur (university entry qualification). Following graduation, Rall volunteered for military service in December 1936.

On 4 December 1936, Rall joined the 13. (Württembergisches) Infanterie-Regiment of the Army in Ludwigsburg as a Fahnenjunker (junior officer candidate). From 1 January to 31 June 1938, he attended the Kriegsschule, a military school in Dresden. In the summer of 1938, Rall requested to be transferred to the Luftwaffe. Now an Oberfähnrich, he was trained as a pilot at Unterbiberg airfield. (Note: Flight training in the Luftwaffe progressed through the levels A1, A2 and B1, B2, referred to as A/B flight training. A training included theoretical and practical training in aerobatics, navigation, long-distance flights and dead-stick landings. The B courses included high-altitude flights, instrument flights, night landings and training to handle the aircraft in difficult situations.) On 1 September 1938, he was promoted to Leutnant (second lieutenant). Rall then attended the Jagdfliegerschule Werneuchen (fighter pilot school) from 15 July to 15 September 1939. He was then posted to 4. Staffel (4th squadron) of Jagdgeschwader 52 (JG 52—52nd Fighter Wing) on 16 September where he served as a Rottenführer (flight leader of a Rotte).

== World War II ==
World War II in Europe began on 1 September 1939 when German forces invaded Poland. JG 52 did not support the invasion. It was posted to western Germany, protecting the German border during the "Phoney War" and Rall did not see combat. On 7 March 1940, he was transferred to 8. Staffel when JG 52 was augmented by the newly created III. Gruppe (3rd group). On 10 May 1940 Fall Gelb began, and JG 52 supported German forces in the invasion of Belgium and Battle of France. On the third day of the campaign, 12 May 1940, Rall achieved his first victory. Three French Curtiss H75-C1 fighters were attacking a German reconnaissance aircraft at a height of 26,000 feet (7,900 meters). Rall attacked them and shot down one, stating: "I was lucky in my first dogfight, but it did give me a hell of a lot of self-confidence ... and a scaring, because I was also hit by many bullets." The victory was his only success on the Western Front.

JG 52 was later moved to Peuplingues and Coquelles on the French Channel coast where it fought in the Battle of Britain. Due to heavy losses, he was given command as a Staffelkapitän (squadron leader) of 8. Staffel JG 52 (Note: For an explanation of Luftwaffe unit designations see Organisation of the Luftwaffe during World War II.) on 25 July 1940. He was promoted to Oberleutnant (first lieutenant) a week later, on 1 August 1940. Rall replaced Oberleutnant Lothar Ehrlich, who was killed in action with No. 610 Squadron RAF the previous day during the convoy battles. Ehrlich was one of three pilots killed that day. Rall said of the battle, "probably no one even had time to shout a warning. Suddenly a flock of Spitfires were on us like hawks on a bunch of chickens." Rall placed the blame for losses on faulty tactics such as flying the Bf 109s in close escort roles for the slow Junkers Ju 87 Stuka dive-bombers. On the day he was appointed Oberleutnant, JG 52 lost another four pilots, including two Staffelkapitäns. Rall's Staffel lost one pilot missing in action with No. 65 Squadron RAF over Dover in the early afternoon. Rall and his unit achieved little. Several of the highest claiming pilots of JG 52, including Gerhard Barkhorn, Alfred Grislawski, Adolf Dickfeld, were not successful over England.

The rise of General Ion Antonescu in Romania in 1940 led to a reorganization of his country's armed forces. In this task, he was supported by a military mission from Germany, the Luftwaffenmission Rumänien (Luftwaffe Mission Romania) under the command of Generalleutnant (equivalent to major general) Wilhelm Speidel. III. Gruppe JG 52 was transferred to Bucharest in mid-October and temporarily renamed I. Gruppe of Jagdgeschwader 28 (JG 28—28th Fighter Wing) until 4 January 1941. Its primary task was to train Romanian Air Force personnel. Rall arrived at Pipera Airfield on 15 October, where 8. Staffel stayed until 18 November when they moved to Leipzig-Mockau Airfield. Three days later, 8. Staffel moved to Parndorf in Austria. On 30 November, the Staffel began relocating back to Pipera Airfield where they arrived on 2 December, staying there until 27 May 1941.

Rall's unit was then transferred to Greece and participated in the final phase of the Balkans Campaign. On 27 May, Rall flew to Plovdiv, Saloniki, Tatoi Airfield north of Athens and then to Molaoi where he stayed until 10 June. Based at Molaoi, he flew combat missions in support of the airborne invasion and subsequent Battle of Crete. JG 52 was transferred back to Romania to help defend their recently acquired allies' Ploiești oil fields.

=== Eastern Front ===
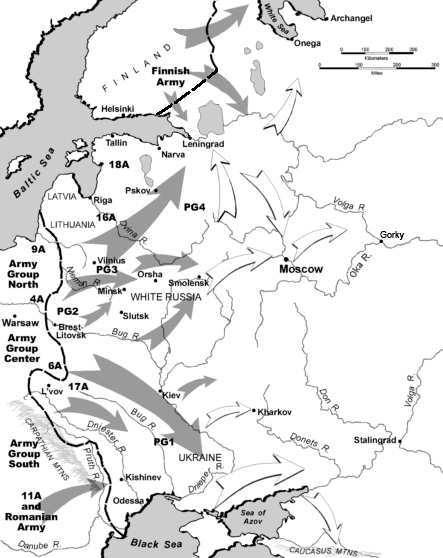
Map indicating Operation Barbarossa's attack plan

On 21 June 1941, III. Gruppe was ordered to Mizil in preparation for Operation Barbarossa, the German invasion of the Soviet Union. Its primary objective was to provide fighter protection for the oil fields and refineries at Ploiești. The invasion of the Soviet Union began on 22 June. The next day, the Gruppe moved to Mamaia, the northern district of Constanța on the Black Sea coast. On 22 June, the Axis forces launched the war on the Eastern Front. The majority of JG 52 were supporting Army Group South and the invasion of the Ukrainian SSR.

Rall's contingent remained in eastern Romania. The Red Air Force (VVS) immediately began a campaign to destroy the Romanian oil fields. Major General Pavel Zhigarev, commanding the VVS ChF (Air Command Crimea), committed the 63 BAP (63rd Bomber Aviation Regiment) and 40 SBAP (40th High Speed Bomber Aviation Regiment). The attacks met with some success, although heavy losses forced the switch to night bombing from mid-July. Rall scored his second, third and fourth victories intercepting Soviet bombers. During a five-day period, III. Gruppe JG 52 claimed between 45 and 50 Soviet aircraft. Rall remarked the reason for the success was the Soviets did not provide fighter escort for their bombers.

The Gruppe moved to Belaya Tserkov on 1 August during the Battle of Kiev and also used an airfield at Yampil from 6 to 8 August. Rall claimed his fifth victory on 4 August thus becoming an "ace". While providing escort for Sturzkampfgeschwader 77 (StG 77—77th Dive Bomber Wing) on 13 August 1941, with Jagdgeschwader 3 (JG 3—3rd Fighter Wing), Rall claimed a Polikarpov I-16 as did JG 3's Günther Lützow. The Soviet pilots were from the 88 IAP Fighter Regiment and identified as Lieutenants Yakov Kozlov and Ivan Novikov. (Note: IAP—Istrebitelny Aviatsionny Polk (Fighter Aviation Regiment—Истребительный Авиационный Полк)) III. Gruppe JG 52 supported the encirclement of Kiev in August.

Rall claimed 12 victories in October 1941 as III. Gruppe JG 52 fought for air superiority during the First Battle of Kharkov; an autumn offensive to seize the industrialized regions of Eastern Ukraine. On 14 October there was heavy air fighting. Rall claimed an Ilyushin Il-2 over his group's Poltava airfield after being scrambled in the midst of a Soviet air attack. The Germans had failed in the race for the Ukrainian industrial heartland. After the capture of Kharkov and Stalino the Germans found 54 medium and 223 large factories; all empty. Some 1.5 million wagonloads had been evacuated.

On 23 October, III. Gruppe JG 52 moved to Chaplynka in the Crimea. With II. Gruppe JG 3 and JG 77, it was ordered to clear the skies. The Crimean Campaign lasted into the following year. The German fighter units claimed 140 aircraft from 18 to 24 October over Perekop. Rall had reached 28 victories by this date. At the time, his regular wingman was Obergefreiter Friedrich Wachowiak.

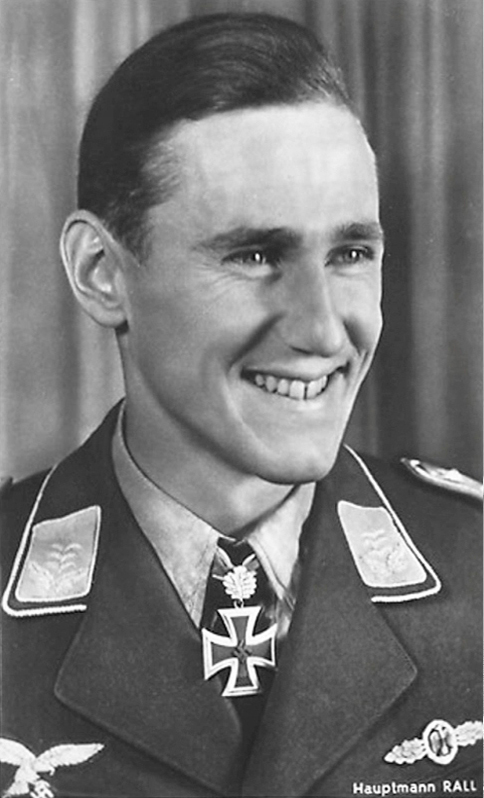
Knight's Cross portrait, 1942

The Gruppe then moved to an airfield at Taganrog on 2 November where they stayed until 1 January 1942. In November the Red Army regrouped and conducted a well-orchestrated recapture of Rostov. The victory denied the Germans access to the Caucasus. Rall received the Honor Goblet of the Luftwaffe (Ehrenpokal der Luftwaffe) on 17 November. On 28 November 1941, Rall claimed his 36th victory near the contested city, but as he watched the burning I-16 fall in the fading light, Rall relaxed his vigilance and was shot down. He tried to fly back to German lines with a damaged engine, but crash landed and was knocked unconscious. A German tank crew rescued him from the wreck. His Bf 109 F-4 (Werknummer 7308—factory number) came down in the vicinity of Rostov.

X-rays revealed he had broken his back in three places. Doctors told him he was finished as a pilot and transferred him to a hospital in Vienna in December 1941. Despite the prognosis, Rall defied odds and returned to combat a year later. During his treatment, he met Hertha Schön, whom he married in 1943. (Note: According to Rall's own account, his wife Hertha helped a number of Jewish families escape to England following the Anschluss, the annexation of Austria into Nazi Germany on 12 March 1938. Prior to becoming a doctor, Hertha worked as a nurse and was befriended by several Jewish doctors and their families in Vienna whom she helped relocate to England. These activities did not go unnoticed by the Gestapo and Hertha left Vienna and moved to Prague to study medicine as well as to avoid further investigation and potential prosecution. In early 1943, Rall himself became subject to these investigations, which led nowhere.) While hospitalized, he was awarded the German Cross in Gold (Deutsches Kreuz in Gold) on 15 December 1941. In Rall's absence, III. Gruppe had claimed 90 of the 135 aircraft shot down by Luftflotte 4 in December. This was achieved without any loss; making it the most successful of the German fighter groups. The VVS Southern Front admitted the loss of 44 aircraft from 1 to 22 December. The losses for the remaining nine days were not stated.

Rall returned to 8. Staffel JG 52 in August 1942. From 2 to 30 August, Rall claimed victory 37 through 62; a run of 26 aerial victories in a four-week period. On 6 August Rall claimed four in one day. At this time Rall's unit was operating in support of the Battle of the Caucasus, deep in southern Russia. His 61st claim was for a victory achieved in the vicinity of Grozny. German forces reached the Terek River in late August 1942 and erected pontoon bridges. The Soviets began air attacks on the crossings, and Rall's III. Gruppe claimed 32 aerial victories in their defense.

On 3 September, Rall was awarded the Knight's Cross of the Iron Cross (Ritterkreuz des Eisernen Kreuzes). The pilots of JG 52 opposed the Soviet 4th Air Army (4 VA) effectively; and with pilots such as Rall, Dickfeld and Grislawski, they dominated the air space whenever they appeared in strength. The 4 VA reported the loss of 149 aircraft in September 1942. On 30 September 1942 Rall claimed his 90th aerial victim, bringing his total for the month to 28.

On 22 October, Rall was credited with his 100th aerial victory. He was the 28th Luftwaffe pilot to achieve the century mark. On 2 November 1942, Rall was required to meet Adolf Hitler and was personally awarded the Knight's Cross of the Iron Cross with Oak Leaves (Ritterkreuz des Eisernen Kreuzes mit Eichenlaub). Rall took the opportunity to ask Hitler when the war would be over. To Rall's surprise Hitler replied that he did not know. After the ceremony Rall was granted leave. Rall travelled by train to Vienna on 11 November and married Hertha. Upon completion of his leave, Rall returned to the front as III. Gruppe JG 52 was ordered to cover the retreat after the Battle of Stalingrad where several Axis field armies were destroyed.

=== Kuban bridgehead ===
The Kuban bridgehead was the main area of operations for Rall in early 1943. Hitler wished to maintain a foothold in the Caucasus to defend the Crimea and retain the captured facilities at Maykop, which had just been repaired. Hitler hoped he could use the region as a staging area for a renewed offensive against the Soviet oilfields. The Luftwaffe was rushed to the Kuban to support the German 17th Army's defenses. StG 2, StG 77, StG 1, JG 3, and JG 52 were sent to the region as powerful close support just as the Soviet Front began its offensive. The fighter units were able to inflict heavy losses on Soviet aviation. Rall, who was not impressed by the latest Bell P-39 Airacobra now in use by Soviet pilots, observed that Soviet fighter aviation displayed a new aggressive posture in late 1942 and early 1943.

Rall achieved his first successes over the combat area of the Kuban bridgehead on 21 March 1943, and by 30 April had claimed 126 aircraft destroyed. The Gruppe was moved to an airfield at Taman on 1 April. Operating from Taman until 2 July, III. Gruppe also flew missions from Kerch on 12 May, from Sarabuz and Saky on 14 May, from Zürichtal (now Solote Pole near Kirovske) on 23 May, and Yevpatoria on 25/26 June. Rall claimed his 116th aerial victory on 20 April, this claim was the Geschwader's 5,000th victory. In the first week of May, Rall claimed a Soviet-flown Spitfire. After filling out and submitting the combat report, Rall was told by his superiors to keep the encounter to himself lest it lower morale. Three weeks later he was credited with a 145th victory. Rall noted the improvement of Soviet pilot training and regarded the Kuban as the first serious test of the German fighter force on the Eastern Front.

=== Group commander ===
The German defenses held in the Kuban in 1943 until the autumn. JG 52 moved north in preparation for Operation Citadel and the Battle of Kursk. Rall, who had already served as acting Gruppenkommandeur (group commander) of III. Gruppe in February and March 1943, officially replaced Major Hubertus von Bonin in this position on 5 July 1943. Command of 8. Staffel passed to Leutnant Friedrich Obleser. Rall had 42 aircraft under his command—two over the full complement of machines and pilots—35 were operational. I. Gruppe JG 52, by comparison, had 32 Bf 109s operational out of a total of 34. The Stab (headquarters unit) of JG 52 contributed a further four Bf 109s.

Rall continued to claim enemy aircraft. On 8 July a two-man patrol with Erich Hartmann resulted in two claims for him, and a third for Rall. A Soviet post-battle analysis mentioned this specific engagement;

Eight Yak-1s in the Provorot region observed two Me 109s off their flight path. Paying no attention to the enemy aircraft our fighters continued. Seizing a convenient moment, the German fighters attacked our aircraft and shot down three Yak-1s.

III./JG 52 emblem

On 9 July, following combat with Soviet fighters, Rall made a forced landing in his Bf 109 G-6 (Werknummer 20019) near Petrovka, north of Belgorod. Four days later, a mid-air collision with a Lavochkin-Gorbunov-Gudkov LaGG-3 fighter resulted in another forced landing at Ugrim airfield. Rall claimed 21 air victories in July but the German offensive rapidly bogged down. The Red Army began a counteroffensive in the region to contain the German operation and destroy its forces, launching Operation Kutuzov and Operation Polkovodets Rumyantsev. Rall stated that after Kursk his pilots no longer believed the endsieg, though the German army managed to stabilize the front somewhat over the following weeks. On 3 August, Rall's group had only 22 operational Bf 109s from a total of 29; down from its designated strength of 40 aircraft.

The claims of fighter pilots on each side have often been disputed. The 2nd Air Army, responsible for defending the airspace opposite Stab. I. and III. Gruppe JG 52 at the start of the battle, lost 153 fighters from 5 to 10 July 1943, representing 40 percent of its initial strength. The Soviets admitted the loss of 1,000 aircraft in their "defensive" phase of the battle. In the first three days till 8 July, Soviet records admit the loss of 566 aircraft while the Germans claimed 923; not all of the German claims were confirmed by their own side. The 17th Air Army, opposite II. Gruppe JG 52, noted 706 aircraft lost while the Germans claimed 1,052. At the beginning of the offensive, the only fighter support for JG 52 came from II. and III. Gruppe of JG 3.

In August 1943, Rall claimed 33 aircraft shot down as JG 52 fought over Central Ukraine through the late summer. Rall claimed two LaGG-3 fighters shot down on 29 August 1943 in the vicinity of Kuybyshev, present-day Samara, taking his total to 200 aerial victories. Following Hermann Graf and Hans Philipp, Rall was the third fighter pilot to reach the double century mark. This achievement earned him a named reference in the Wehrmachtbericht that day. On 12 September, he was also honored with the Knight's Cross of the Iron Cross with Oak Leaves and Swords (Ritterkreuz des Eisernen Kreuzes mit Eichenlaub und Schwertern). He was the 34th member of the German armed forces to be so honored. The presentation was made by Hitler at the Wolf's Lair, Hitler's headquarters in Rastenburg on 22 September 1943. Three other Luftwaffe officers were presented with awards that day by Hitler. Major Hartmann Grasser and Hauptmann Heinrich Prinz zu Sayn-Wittgenstein were awarded the Oak Leaves, and Hauptmann Walter Nowotny also received the Swords to his Knight's Cross with Oak Leaves.

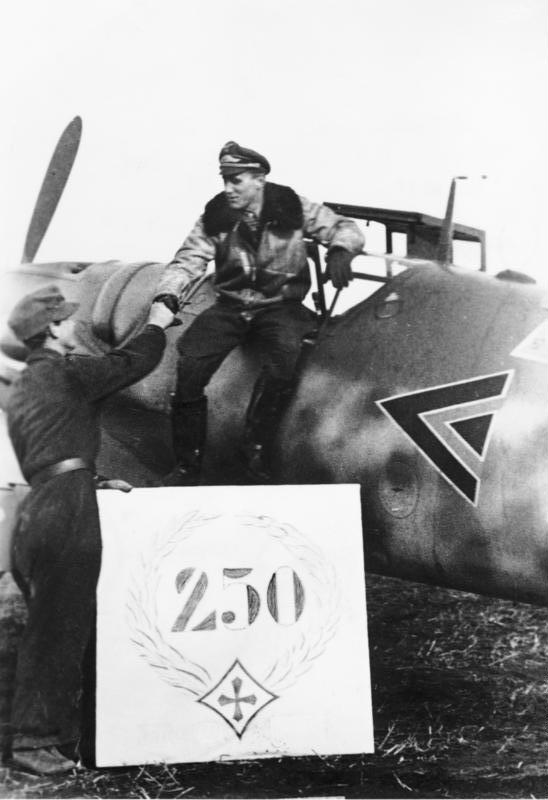
28 November 1943, Rall after his 250th aerial victory

Following the award ceremony, Rall went on vacation until the end of September. On his return Rall immediately began where he left off, claiming Soviet aircraft consistently. Over the course of October 1943 he claimed 40 aircraft; his first coming on 1 October. The majority were claimed in the Southern Ukraine. With few exceptions, the enemy aircraft claimed were fighters.

On 1 November 1943, Rall was promoted to Major, a rank he retained until the end of the war. In November he claimed 12 aircraft and on the twenty-eighth day became the second fighter pilot after Nowotny to reach 250 aerial victories. Rall filed his last claim of the year on 30 November. It was credited as his 252nd aerial victory. On 11 January 1944, Rall received the certification for the Oak Leaves and Swords along with medals from Hitler. Rall was on home leave from 1 December 1943 to 30 January 1944. During his absence, III. Gruppe was temporarily led by Oberleutnant Josef Haiböck.

In 1944 Rall continued to claim but at a slower rate. The Soviet Crimean Offensive opened on 8 April and five weeks later ended the German occupation in the Crimea. Rall claimed his 273rd and last aerial victory on the Eastern Front on 16 April 1944 over a Lavochkin La-5 fighter aircraft in the vicinity of Sevastopol.

=== Defense of the Reich ===
On 19 April 1944, Rall was transferred to Jagdgeschwader 11 (JG 11—11th Fighter Wing), as Gruppenkommandeur of II. Gruppe JG 11, flying operations in Defense of the Reich. Rall replaced Major Günther Specht who was appointed Geschwaderkommodore of JG 11. Rall led his unit against the bomber fleets of the Eighth Air Force of the United States Army Air Forces (USAAF). The purpose of his Bf 109-equipped group was to engage the American escorting fighters to allow the slower, heavier, and well-armed Focke-Wulf Fw 190 Sturmbock (Battering Ram) aircraft to intercept the bombers.

Within two weeks, Rall was in combat. On 29 April, he claimed a Lockheed P-38 Lightning shot down north of Hanover. That day the USAAF targeted Berlin with 679 heavy-bombers escorted by 814 fighter aircraft. The German day fighter force was beginning to falter under the pressure. General der Jagdflieger (General of Fighters) Adolf Galland reported that from January to April 1944, 1,000 German pilots had been killed or wounded; Rall would soon become one of them.

On 12 May, the Eighth Air Force targeted the German fuel industry. 886 bombers escorted by 980 fighters headed for the five main synthetic fuel factories in Leuna, Merseburg, Böhlen and Zeitz, the Protectorate of Bohemia and Moravia and Brüx. That day, Rall was leading a Staffel of Bf 109s and bounced a flight of three Republic P-47 Thunderbolts led by Colonel Hubert Zemke. Zemke was experimenting with a new tactic, the "Zemke fan", in which independent flights scattered in front of the bombers in order to cover as much sky as possible, thereby maximizing the chance of intercepting German fighters. Zemke's flight had strayed too far in front of the bomber stream, and the fighters of JG 11 spotted an opening. The Zemke tactic left flights of P-47s isolated if large numbers of Bf 109s were encountered.

Rall was flying at 36,000 feet (11,000 meters) without cabin heating or pressurization, and 10,000 feet (3,000 meters) above the Fw 190s. Rall attacked and claimed a Thunderbolt. His Staffel was then ambushed by P-47s. Rall dived to escape, but his Bf 109 could not out-dive the Thunderbolts, which were attacking line-abreast, preventing him from turning left or right. Rall was near 620 miles per hour (1,000 kilometers per hour), but his aircraft was hit in the engine and radiator by pilots of the 56th Fighter Group. Rall's left thumb was hit, and after he cleared the ice from his windshield with his remaining good hand, he decided there was no escape, and bailed out. He landed in a tree on a steep slope, and subsequently rolled down into a gully after releasing his parachute harness. By luck, he avoided aggravating his earlier back injury and was tended to by farmers. Rall was hospitalized for many months in Nassau. Doctors found his thumb was attached only by skin and could not be saved. Rall credited the wound with saving his life as the Eighth Air Force had established air superiority over Germany.

Rall's unit succeeded in this battle, but at a high cost. Besides Rall's claim of one P-47, two North American P-51 Mustang fighters were also claimed by other pilots. The group lost 11 Bf 109s, with two pilots killed and five wounded—all of the Stabschwarm were shot down. In autumn 1944, Rall moved to Bad Wörishofen and became an instructor at the Verbandsführerschule of the General der Jagdflieger (Training School for Unit Leaders). Part of this training involved flying captured Allied aircraft and preparing notes for student pilots on their capabilities and deficiencies. Rall flew in mock-combat with Bf 109s; specifically, he flew the Spitfire, P-38, P-47, and the P-51 fighters.

On 20 February 1945, he was appointed Geschwaderkommodore of Jagdgeschwader 300 (JG 300—300th Fighter Wing), operating from airfields in southern Germany during the last months of the war. On his arrival Rall found 15 burning German fighters on the airfield courtesy of a low-level P-51 attack. Rall reported the wing was in chaos, with no radar, while fuel and food had to be sought from day to day. JG 300 withdrew to Salzburg in Austria as American and French forces advanced deep into southern Germany. Rall did not claim an enemy aircraft during his time with JG 300.

On 2 March 1945, JG 300 sortied with all four groups for the last time supported by JG 301. The two units sent 198 fighters to contest an American air raid. Only small groups reached the bombers, but their successes had no effect. JG 300 continued to fly and fight into 1945. On one mission, the pilots claimed an optimistic total of 50 to 60 aircraft at the cost of 24 killed against the ever present USAAF fighter escorts, while Rall was hospitalized again due to his wounds.

== Later life and service ==
Rall remained in a prisoner of war camp for a few weeks. Rall was approached by the Americans who were recruiting Luftwaffe pilots who had experience with the Messerschmitt Me 262 fighter. He was transferred to Bovingdon near Hemel Hempstead, and then based at RAF Tangmere, where he met RAF fighter pilot Robert Stanford Tuck, with whom he became close friends.

After his release, Rall settled back into civilian life working for Siemens & Halske as a salesman from July 1947 to May 1948. In 1948 he visited England again. Rall accompanied Hertha Rall and stayed in Grosvenor Square with Dr Paul Kaspar and Jewish acquaintances, whom she had helped escape from the Nazis. Rall knew of Hertha's wartime Jewish connections and was concerned they would attract the attention of Nazi authorities. In 1943, Hertha was suspected of Jewish sympathies by the Gestapo, but no action was taken.

Of Nazi crimes, Rall acknowledged the pilots at the front knew of Nazi concentration camps but didn't know exactly what they were used for. When he first heard of Auschwitz and The Holocaust, initially he believed it to be propaganda. Rall could not believe Germans would do such things. The criminal nature of the Nazi Party did not occur to Rall when Hitler came to power; "The fact that we did not explore the essence of the Nazi regime when it came to power is, of course, one of our great failings."

By 1954, Hertha was a physician at the Schule Schloss Salem near Lake Constance. There, Rall became a personal assistant to the dean of the school, Prince George William of Hanover. Rall and his wife were invited by Prince George William of Hanover and met Queen Elizabeth II and her husband Prince Philip, Duke of Edinburgh during their first state visit to West Germany (18–28 May 1965).

=== With the German Air Force ===
Rall rejoined the newly established West German military in 1956 and became one of the first cadre of officers in the German Air Force, at the time referred to as the Bundesluftwaffe. Around 6,000 veterans survived the war but only 160 were fit to fly after years of idleness. The Bundesluftwaffe was ten years behind the times in modern aviation experience. The German military cadre knew they would have to spend years as pupils before they could stand on their own.

In August 1956, Rall received refresher training flying the North American T-6 Texan at the Landsberg-Lech Air Base. He was then sent to Fürstenfeldbruck Air Base where he received further training on the Lockheed T-33. Rall was sent to the United States to train on modern jets at Lackland Air Force Base near San Antonio, Texas. Rall was one of fifteen officers sent to the US. Among this group were former Luftwaffe pilots Erich Hartmann and Friedrich Obleser. The German pilots were then sent to Luke Air Force Base in Arizona where they received further training. The idea was to make the Bundesluftwaffe a carbon copy of the United States Air Force. The future chief of staff commented on modern USAF training methods compared to the old, highly individualistic training program of the Luftwaffe:

The systematic and consistent American training methods were impressive. All in all, these methods were better, more efficient in view of the aircraft we were being trained to fly. Indeed, we were going to fly jets—for most of us this was a new era. The memories of flying the Me 262 were nostalgic for some of us but not a secure foundation you could build on.

One of his tasks was to oversee modifications to the Lockheed F-104 Starfighter to comply with the requirement of the Bundeswehr, leading to the F-104G version. The accident rate of the new version was alarming when introduced in 1960. The machine was nicknamed the Witwenmacher (widow maker) after 292 crashes and 116 deaths. Rall was mentioned as having been involved in the Lockheed bribery scandals. In 1975, the former Lockheed Corporation lobbyist Ernest Hauser made a public appearance on a German television show aired by the public broadcaster ARD. Hauser claimed Lockheed had made a series of bribes to groups which included the Christian Social Union in Bavaria and Rall, the head of the F-104 task-force. The party and its leader, Franz Josef Strauß, denied the allegations, and Strauß filed a slander suit against Hauser. As the allegations could not be corroborated, the entire issue was dropped.

Officers like Erich Hartmann and Johannes Steinhoff believed the F-104 was too advanced for German pilots. Rall and Steinhoff thought it was a matter of training. They visited the United States to receive further training which reduced accidents when introduced to the German program. In particular, the training sought to address the fundamental change in role from high-altitude interceptor in the United States to fighter-bomber in Germany; and the radically different climate and weather conditions experienced at low altitudes by German pilots over Germany.

Rall received recommendations for senior commands by his then superior General Kurt Kuhlmey. Following his promotion to Brigadegeneral (brigadier general), he was appointed commander of the 3. Luftwaffendivision (3rd Air Force Division) in Münster. In summer 1966, he visited Fort Bliss where the Bundesluftwaffe had a training facility commanded by Rall's former World War II comrade, Brigadegeneral Walter Krupinski.

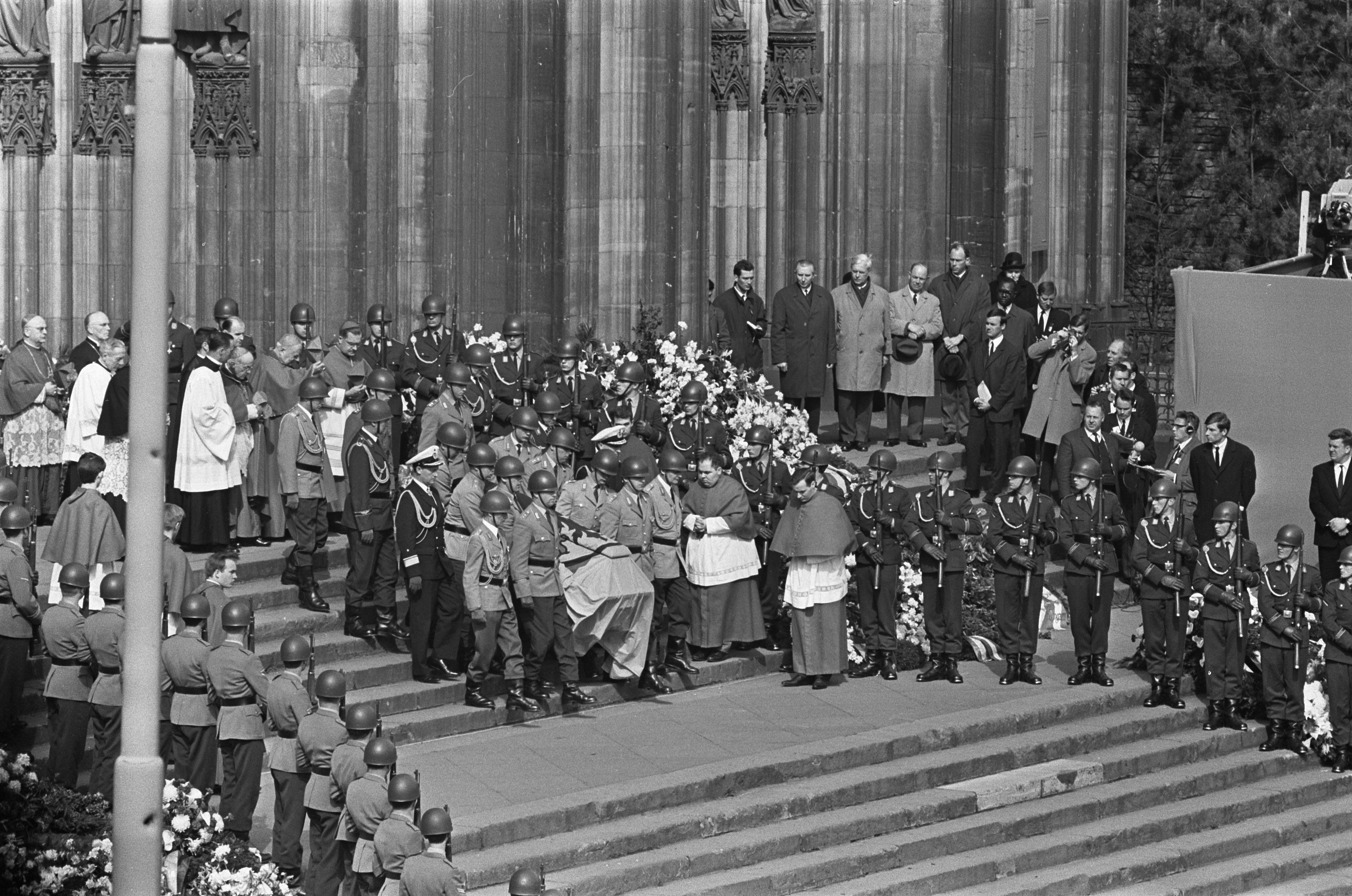
Rall (wearing a helmet, 3rd person on the right of the coffin behind the man with the white cap) at Adenauer's funeral.

When Konrad Adenauer, the former Chancellor of Germany, died on 19 April 1967, Rall was chosen for the military honor guard on 25 April. He was instructed to appear in full uniform, wearing all his medals and decorations. Since his awards had been stolen by a US soldier during his captivity, Rall had to purchase a new set of medals. Rall was then promoted to Generalmajor on 15 November 1967, and on 1 April 1968 was given command of the 1. Luftwaffendivision (1st Air Force Division) in Meßstetten. The promotion was endorsed by General Helmut Mahlke of the Office of the German Air Force.

On 1 May 1969, Rall was appointed chief-of-staff of the Fourth Allied Tactical Air Force (4 ATAF) based at Ramstein Air Base. There, he lived near Chuck Yeager, at the time vice-commander of the Seventeenth Air Force. Rall was then appointed commanding general of Luftflottenkommando (Air Force Forces Command) at Köln-Wahn, a position he held from 1 October to 31 December 1970. From 1 January 1971 to 31 March 1974, he held the position of Inspector of the Air Force. In this capacity, he visited Washington DC and Fort Bliss.

On 22 November 1973, Rall in his role as Inspector of the Air Force gave Jagdgeschwader 74 (JG 74—74th Fighter Wing) the honorary name "Mölders". Werner Mölders was a former Luftwaffe fighter pilot and leader during the Spanish Civil War and World War II who had died in a flying accident on 22 November 1941. In his commemoration speech, Rall emphasized Mölders' military virtues and achievements. In 1998, on the 61st anniversary of the bombing of the Spanish town of Guernica during the Spanish Civil War, the German Parliament decided members of the Condor Legion such as Mölders should "no longer be honored". In 2005, the Federal Ministry of Defence decided to remove the name "Mölders" from JG 74. The decision was confirmed on 11 March 2005 by the Federal Minister of Defense Peter Struck.

Rall served as a military attaché with NATO from 1 April 1974 to 13 October 1975. Rall's forced retirement in 1975 was as a result of a controversial visit to apartheid-governed South Africa. Rall received a request from a German journalist, and former Bundesluftwaffe pilot, to attend a veterans meeting there. When news of the general's ill-advised visit to Cape Town broke, German weekly magazine Stern claimed Rall held high-level meetings with South African officials and emphasized the personal nature of the trip.

Despite its policy of apartheid, South Africa was seen as strategically important to NATO and the South Africans exploited Rall's visit. The political embarrassment, following a concerted press campaign, encouraged Federal Minister of Defense Georg Leber to retire Rall in October 1975. Rall subsequently resigned as military attaché to NATO. According to the German news magazine Der Spiegel, Leber had stated he had not known of Rall's planned visit to South Africa. However, the South African ambassador in West Germany, Donald Bell Sole, had informed Leber six months before the visit about Rall's travel plans. Sole had informed the South African government of the conversation between him and Leber in a letter dated 4 April 1974. When Der Spiegel published a copy of this letter in October 1974, the South African government was forced to recall Sole from West Germany.

=== Civilian life ===
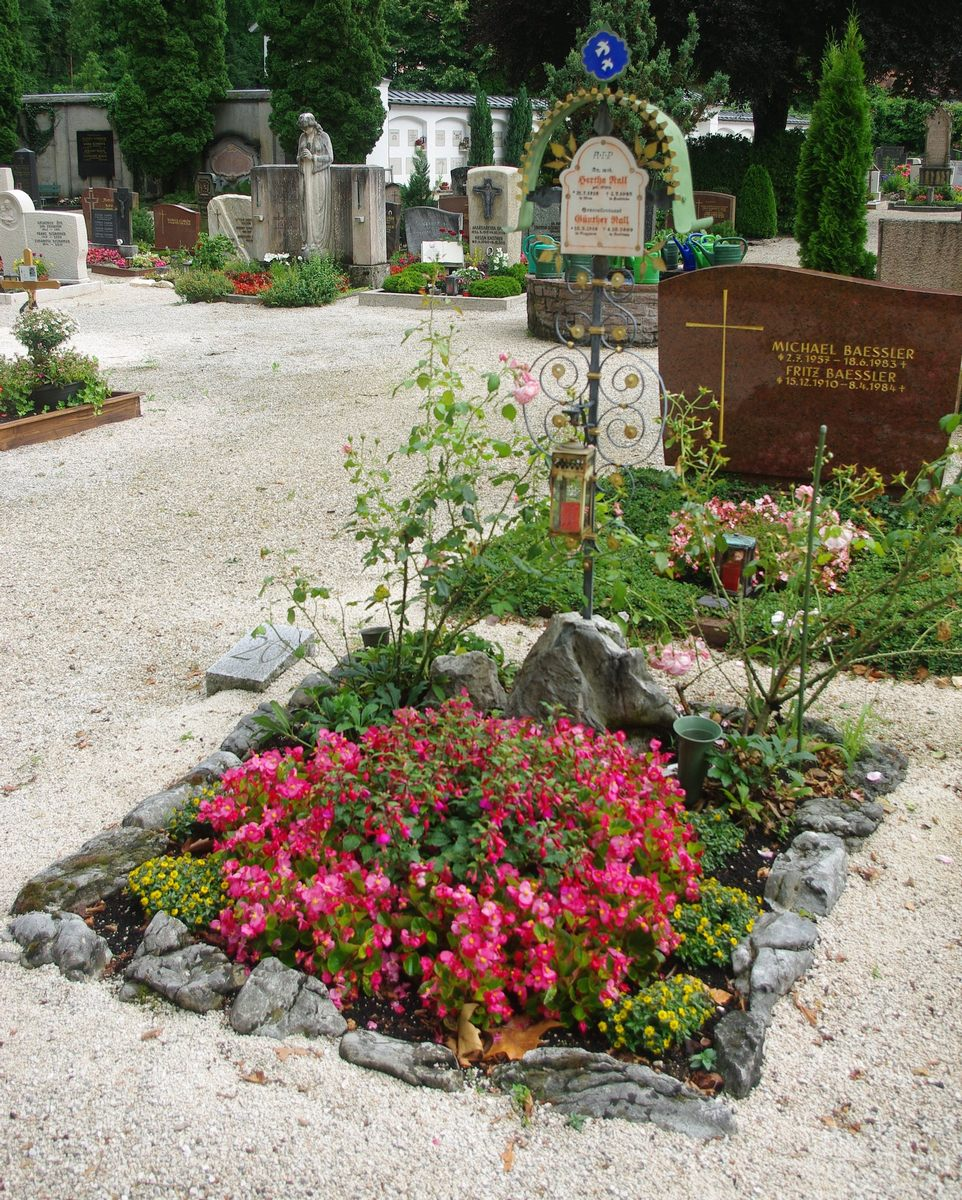
Rall's grave in Bad Reichenhall

Following his retirement from military service, Rall worked in the aerospace and arms industries as a consultant. Companies he worked for included General Electric, MTU Aero Engines and for Gerd H. Buck. His consultancy work ended in 1989. MTU licensed, built and maintained the General Electric J79 axial-flow turbojet engine installed in the F-104 Starfighter. In this capacity, Rall acted as a liaison to various NATO member countries, as well as with the Bolivarian Military Aviation and civilian aviation in Venezuela. Buck was the owner of a company based in Fronau, now part of Schneizlreuth, which had specialized in defensive systems against missiles, and laser and radar guided weapons of all types. The company is now a subsidiary of Rheinmetall.

On 4 July 1985, Rall's wife Hertha died. The couple had four children. Their first child named Monika, born six months into the pregnancy in 1942, only lived for 24 hours. Their second child Alex, born in 1945, died following a De Havilland Mosquito attack. On 28 September 1950, their daughter Franziska was born in Stuttgart, and their son Felizitas was born on 17 March 1955. Rall's memoir, Mein Flugbuch (My Flight Logbook), was released in 2004.

On 4 October 2009, Rall died in Bad Reichenhall after suffering from a heart attack. He was buried with military honors at the St. Zeno Cemetery following a memorial service held at the Evangelical City Church in Bad Reichenhall on 15 October. The funeral was attended by the Inspector of the Air Force, Klaus-Peter Stieglitz. Rall's damaged flying glove, which he wore when shot down in 1944 by American fighters, is now on display at the National Air and Space Museum in Washington, D.C.

== Summary of career ==
=== Aerial victory claims ===
According to American historian David T. Zabecki, Rall was credited with 275 aerial victories. Spick also lists Rall with 275 aerial victories claimed in 621 combat missions and a mission-to-claim ratio of 2.26. Of these, three were claimed over the Western Allies and the remaining 272 on the Eastern Front. Mathews and Foreman, authors of Luftwaffe Aces – Biographies and Victory Claims, researched the German Federal Archives and found records for 274 aerial victory claims, plus one further unconfirmed claim. This number includes one victory over a French P-36, one victory over a U.S. P-38 fighter, and 272 Soviet-piloted aircraft on the Eastern Front.

=== Awards ===
- Iron Cross (1939)
  - 2nd Class (23 May 1940)
  - 1st Class (July 1940)
- Wound Badge (1939) in Gold
- Combined Pilots-Observation Badge
- "Crete" Cuffband
- Front Flying Clasp of the Luftwaffe for fighter pilots in Gold with penant "600"
- Honour Goblet of the Luftwaffe (Ehrenpokal der Luftwaffe) on 17 November 1941 as Oberleutnant and pilot
- German Cross in Gold on 15 December 1941 as Oberleutnant in the 8./Jagdgeschwader 52
- Knight's Cross of the Iron Cross with Oak Leaves and Swords
  - Knight's Cross on 3 September 1942 as Staffelkapitän of the 8./Jagdgeschwader 52 (Note: According to Scherzer, Rall was awarded the Knight's Cross on 4 September 1942 as pilot in the III./Jagdgeschwader 52.)
  - 134th Oak Leaves on 26 October 1942 as Oberleutnant and Staffelkapitän of the 8./Jagdgeschwader 52
  - 34th Swords on 12 September 1943 as Hauptmann and Gruppenkommandeur in the III/Jagdgeschwader 52
- Commander's Cross of the Order of Merit of the Federal Republic of Germany (1973)

== Publications ==
- Rall, Günther (2007) [2004]. Braatz, Kurt [in German] (ed.). Günther Rall: Mein Flugbuch—Erinnerungen 1938–2004 [Günther Rall: My Flight Book—Recollections 1938–2004] (in German). Moosburg, Germany: NeunundzwanzigSechs Verlag. ISBN 978-3-9807935-3-7.

== Notes ==
Military offices
| Preceded by Major Kurd Peters | Commander of Jagdgeschwader 300; 20 February 1945 – 8 May 1945 | Succeeded by Post abolished |
| Preceded by Major Carl-Heinz Greve | Commander of Jagdbombergeschwader 34 Allgäu; 1 October 1964 – 31 March 1966 | Succeeded by Oberst Hans-Ulrich Flade |
| Preceded by Generalmajor Erwin Wicker | Commander of 3rd Luftwaffe Division (Bundeswehr); 1967 – 31 March 1968 | Succeeded by Generalmajor Günter Proll |
| Preceded by Generalmajor Konrad Stangl | Commander of 1st Luftwaffe Division (Bundeswehr); 1 April 1968 – 15 April 1969 | Succeeded by Generalmajor Hans Asmus |
| New creation | Commanding General of Air Force Forces Command; 1 October – 15 December 1970 | Succeeded by Generalleutnant Herbert Wehnelt |
| Preceded by Generalleutnant Johannes Steinhoff | Inspector of the Air Force; 1 January 1971 – 31 March 1974 | Succeeded by Generalleutnant Gerhard Limberg |
