= Friedrich Obleser =

German general and fighter pilot during World War II

- Obleser during his service in the Bundeswehr
- Born: 21 February 1923; Pottenstein, Austria
- Died: 5 June 2004 (aged 81); Neunkirchen-Seelscheid, Germany
- Military career
- Allegiance: Nazi Germany; West Germany
- Branch: Luftwaffe; German Air Force
- Service years: 1940–1945, 1956–1983
- Rank: Oberleutnant (Wehrmacht); Generalleutnant (Bundeswehr)
- Unit: JG 52
- Commands: Jagdbombergeschwader 43; Jagdbombergeschwader 31
- Conflicts: World War II
- Awards: Knight's Cross of the Iron Cross; Order of Merit of the Federal Republic of Germany

Inspector of the Air Force
- In office 1978–1983
- Preceded by: Gerhard Limberg
- Succeeded by: Eberhard Eimler

Friedrich-Erich Obleser (21 February 1923 – 5 June 2004) was a German general in the Bundeswehr. During World War II, he served as a fighter pilot in the Luftwaffe. A fighter ace, Obleser was credited with 120 aerial victories and was a recipient of the Knight's Cross of the Iron Cross, the highest award in the military and paramilitary forces of Nazi Germany during World War II. For his post-war service in the German Air Force, he received the Grand Cross with Star of the Order of Merit of the Federal Republic of Germany.

== Early life and career ==
Obleser was born on 21 February 1923 in Pottenstein in the district of Baden in Lower Austria in Austria. In 1940, he volunteered for military service in the Luftwaffe. Following flight training, (Note: Flight training in the Luftwaffe progressed through the levels A1, A2 and B1, B2, referred to as A/B flight training. A training included theoretical and practical training in aerobatics, navigation, long-distance flights and dead-stick landings. The B courses included high-altitude flights, instrument flights, night landings and training to handle the aircraft in difficult situations.) Obleser was assigned to 8. Staffel (8th squadron) of Jagdgeschwader 52 (JG 52—52nd Fighter Wing), a squadron of III. Gruppe of JG 52.

== World War II ==
World War II in Europe had begun on Friday 1 September 1939 when German forces invaded Poland. In January 1943, Obleser arrived with 8. Staffel under command of Hauptmann Günther Rall at the Gigant airfield which was located in the vicinity of Salsk. At the time, the Red Army had launched Operation Koltso, the final phase of the Battle of Stalingrad. Rall made Obleser his wingman and also appointed him as technical officer of the Staffel, a position which was responsible for the overall readiness of the equipment and aircraft. Obleser flew his first combat mission on 12 January 1943 on the Eastern Front. There, he claimed his first aerial victory on 28 March over a Bell P-39 Airacobra.

The Gruppe was moved to the combat area of the Kuban bridgehead on 1 April 1943 where it was based at an airfield at Taman. Operating from Taman until 2 July, III. Gruppe also flew missions from Kerch on 12 May, from Sarabuz and Saky on 14 May, Zürichtal, present-day Solote Pole, a village near the urban settlement Kirovske on 23 May, and Yevpatoria on 25/26 June. While based at Taman, Obleser claimed ten further aerial victories by end of April, increasing his number of aerial victories to eleven in total. On 28 May 1943, Obleser was wounded when his Messerschmitt Bf 109 G-4 (Werknummer 19284—factory number) was hit by anti-aircraft artillery resulting in a forced landing at Varenikovskaya.

=== Squadron leader ===
Following his convalescence, Obleser was appointed Staffelkapitän (squadron leader) of 8. Staffel of JG 52 on 6 July 1943, succeeding Rall who took command of III. Gruppe. Prior to his appointment, the Staffel had briefly been led by Leutnant Berthold Korts until Obleser took command. In preparation for Operation Citadel, III. Gruppe had relocated to the central sector of the eastern Front. The Gruppe first moved to Zaporizhzhia and then to Ugrim on 3 July. There, under the command of Luftflotte 4, they supported Army Group South fighting on the southern flank of the salient.

III./JG 52 emblem

On 9 September, III. Gruppe moved to an airfield at Dnipropetrovsk, present-day Dnipro, where they stayed until 24 September. Here on 18 September, Obleser claimed his 50th aerial victory and became an "ace-in-a-day" the following day. The Gruppe reached an airfield near Apostolovo on 1 November. With the exception of a brief period from 12 to 20 November when they also used an airfield at Kirovohrad, the Gruppe remained here until 7 January 1944. Here, Obleser claimed further aerial victories, increasing his total to 82 by end of 1943. For this, Obleser received the Honor Goblet of the Luftwaffe (Ehrenpokal der Luftwaffe) on 8 November 1943 and the German Cross in Gold (Deutsches Kreuz in Gold) six days later.

Obleser was awarded the Knight's Cross of the Iron Cross (Ritterkreuz des Eisernen Kreuzes) on 23 March 1944, nominated after his 80th aerial victory. At one point he questioned the aerial victory claims made by Erich Hartmann. Hartmann asked Rall to have Obleser transferred to be Hartmann's wingman for a while. Obleser became a witness on some of Hartmann's claims and no longer questioned Hartmann's claims. On 21 July 1944, Obleser was credited with his 100th aerial victory. He was the 87th Luftwaffe pilot to achieve the century mark.

On 12 December, III. Gruppe moved to an airfield at Zagórze, located 36 kilometers (22 miles) west of Kraków. The Gruppe flew relatively few missions at the time. Obleser toyed around with a Panzerfaust, a recoil-less anti-tank weapon, in an attempt to increase its firing range. On 30 December, Obleser was severely wounded when a Panzerfaust exploded in his hand. He did not see any further action before the end of the war in May 1945. He was temporarily replaced by Leutnant Karl Gratz until Leutnant Viktor Petermann officially succeeded Obleser on 7 January 1945 as commander of 10. Staffel.

== Later life ==
After Obleser was released from US captivity, he worked as a commissioner of a recycling company, which predominantly had to dismantle and dispose of bomber aircraft. He then became head of an industrial application department in the private industry. In 1956, Obleser continued his military career, joining the German Air Force of West Germany as a Hauptmann. Following multiple assignments to various fighter units, Obleser was appointed wing commander of Jagdgeschwader 72 in Leck, later known as Jagdbombergeschwader 43, and then commander of Jagdbombergeschwader 31 "Boelcke". Obleser then held the position of system officer for the multirole combat aircraft (MRCA) within the German Air Staff. He then was appointed general manager of the NATO MRCA Management Agency.

Obleser then served as chief of the Air Force Office (Luftwaffenamt) and commanding general of the Air Force Support Command (Luftwaffenunterstützungskommando). From 1 October 1978 until his retirement on 31 March 1983, he held the position of Inspector of the Air Force in the Bundeswehr, achieving the rank of Generalleutnant.

In June 1981, the Federal Minister of Defence Hans Apel threatened Obleser with early retirement following Obleser's report to the Defense Committee of the German Bundestag (Verteidigungsausschuss des Deutschen Bundestages). Obleser had stated that, due to the latest defense budget cut, the German Air Force could only partially fulfill its obligations. Apel had viewed Obleser's statement as lack of loyalty towards his superiors. Earlier in March 1981, although skeptical of the proposal, Obleser had approved two budget cuts suggested by Inspector General of the Bundeswehr Jürgen Brandt.

Obleser died of natural causes on 5 June 2004 in Neunkirchen-Seelscheid, at 81 years of age.

== Summary of career ==
=== Aerial victory claims ===
According to US historian David T. Zabecki, Obleser was credited with 120 aerial victories. Spick also lists Obleser with 120 aerial victories claimed in approximately 500 combat missions, all which on the Eastern Front. In addition to these claims, Weal states that Obleser claimed nine aerial victories over United States Army Air Forces (USAAF) aircraft, including two heavy bombers. Mathews and Foreman, authors of Luftwaffe Aces — Biographies and Victory Claims, researched the German Federal Archives and state that Obleser was credited with 112 aerial victories, all of which claimed on the Eastern Front. The authors also state that Obleser claimed nine undocumented aerial victories over USAAF aircraft, two heavy bombers and seven fighter aircraft.

Victory claims were logged to a map-reference (PQ = Planquadrat), for example "PQ 34 Ost 86724". The Luftwaffe grid map (Jägermeldenetz) covered all of Europe, western Russia and North Africa and was composed of rectangles measuring 15 minutes of latitude by 30 minutes of longitude, an area of about 360 square miles (930 km^{2}). These sectors were then subdivided into 36 smaller units to give a location area 3 km × 4 km (1.9 mi × 2.5 mi) in size.

Chronicle of aerial victories
This and the ♠ (Ace of spades) indicates those aerial victories which made Obleser an "ace-in-a-day", a term which designates a fighter pilot who has shot down five or more airplanes in a single day. This and the – (dash) indicates unconfirmed aerial victory claims for which Obleser did not receive credit. This and the ? (question mark) indicates information discrepancies listed by Barbas, Prien, Stemmer, Rodeike, Balke, Bock, Mathews and Foreman. This and the * (asterisk) indicates that the authors Barbas, Prien, Stemmer, Rodeike, Balke, Bock, Mathews and Foreman disagree on the claimed aircraft type.
Claim	Date	Time	Type	Location	Claim	Date	Time	Type	Location
– 8. Staffel of Jagdgeschwader 52 – Eastern Front — 4 February – 31 December 1943
1	28 March 1943	05:37	P-39	PQ 34 Ost 86724 vicinity of Tichonowskij	41	21 August 1943	13:20	Il-2	PQ 34 Ost 88283, southwest of Kuibyschewo; 1 km (0.62 mi) south of Jalisawehino
2	11 April 1943	15:55	P-39	PQ 34 Ost 85153; PQ 86153 vicinity of Nowo Nekrassowskij	42	22 August 1943	08:23	LaGG-3* (Note: According to both Barbas, and Mathews and Foreman claimed as a Lavochkin-Gorbunov-Gudkov aircraft.)	PQ 34 Ost 88283, southwest of Kuybyshev; 1 km (0.62 mi) south of Jalisawehino
3	20 April 1943	07:04	LaGG-3*	PQ 34 Ost 85192 vicinity of Erdol	43	22 August 1943	18:00	LaGG-3*	PQ 34 Ost 88284; 10 km (6.2 mi) southwest of Jalisawehino
4	21 April 1943	10:57	LaGG-3*	PQ 34 Ost 75452; 8 km (5.0 mi) south of Novorossiysk	44	24 August 1943	12:44	Il-2 m.H. (Note: The "m.H." refers to an Ilyushin Il-2 with rear gunner (mit Heckschütze).)	PQ 34 Ost 88282, west of Kuibyschewo; 5 km (3.1 mi) southeast of Jalisawehino
? (Note: This claim is not listed by Prien, Stemmer, Rodeike and Bock.)	21 April 1943	11:05	Il-2	PQ 75452; 8 km (5.0 mi) south of Novorossiysk	45	24 August 1943	15:13	Il-2	PQ 34 Ost 88252, Marinowka; 25 km (16 mi) east-northeast of Kuteinykove
5	21 April 1943	11:06	Il-2	PQ 34 Ost 75; PQ 75453; Black Sea, 10 km (6.2 mi) south of Novorossiysk	46	26 August 1943	06:49	P-39	PQ 34 Ost 88273; 15 km (9.3 mi) west-southwest of Jalisawehino
— (Note: This unconfirmed claim is not listed by Prien, Stemmer, Rodeike and Bock, nor by Mathews and Foreman.)	21 April 1943	11:38	Il-2	PQ 75452	47	29 August 1943	06:24	P-39	PQ 34 Ost 88343; 25 km (16 mi) southwest of Kuteinykove
6	24 April 1943	16:48	P-39	PQ 34 Ost 75444; Black Sea, 15 km (9.3 mi) southwest of Novorossiysk	48	5 September 1943	17:15	Il-2 m.H.	PQ 34 Ost 79484; 25 km (16 mi) north-northeast of Grischino
7	24 April 1943	16:53	Il-2 m.H.	PQ 34 Ost 75461; Black Sea, 5 km (3.1 mi) west of Kabardinka	49	14 September 1943	09:25	LaGG-3*	PQ 34 Ost 69413; PQ 68475; 20 km (12 mi) east of Polohy
8? (Note: This claim is not listed by Barbas, nor by Mathews and Foreman.)	27 April 1943	14:18	LaGG-3	PQ 34 Ost 76713	50	18 September 1943	07:30	Il-2 m.H.	PQ 34 Ost 69711; 30 km (19 mi) north-northwest of Pokrowskoje
9	27 April 1943	16:03	LaGG-3*	PQ 34 Ost 75713; PQ 85771 over sea, south of Gelendzhik	51	18 September 1943	13:40	LaGG-3*	PQ 34 Ost 68373; 15 km (9.3 mi) west-northwest of Polohy
10	27 April 1943	16:20	LaGG-3	PQ 34 Ost 85112 north of Mertschanskaja	52♠	19 September 1943	05:25	LaGG-3*	PQ 34 Ost 59444; 20 km (12 mi) west-northwest of Pavlohrad
11	30 April 1943	14:50	LaGG-3*	PQ 34 Ost 85113, east of Krymskaja east of Krymsk	53♠	19 September 1943	08:07	LaGG-3*	PQ 34 Ost 59524; 15 km (9.3 mi) east of Dnepropetrovsk
12	3 May 1943	05:08	I-153* (Note: According to Mathews and Foreman claimed as a Curtiss P-40 Warhawk.)	PQ 34 Ost 76854 east of Varenikovskaya	54♠	19 September 1943	08:10	Il-2 m.H.	PQ 34 Ost 59553; 25 km (16 mi) south-southeast of Dnepropetrovsk
13	3 May 1943	05:12	I-153	PQ 34 Ost 76862 vicinity of Imeni Dimitrowo	55♠	19 September 1943	15:07	Il-2 m.H.	PQ 34 Ost 59583; PQ 59531; 25 km (16 mi) east of Dnepropetrovsk
14	4 May 1943	15:55	LaGG-3*	PQ 34 Ost 85313 southeast of Schapssugskaja	56♠	19 September 1943	15:26	Il-2 m.H.	PQ 34 Ost 59641; 20 km (12 mi) southwest of Pavlohrad
15	5 May 1943	07:22? (Note: According to Barbas, Mathews and Foreman claimed at 07:32.)	LaGG-3*	PQ 34 Ost 85174, southwest of Abinskaja vicinity of Nowenjkij	57	21 September 1943	13:40	LaGG-3*	PQ 34 Ost 59383; PQ 59381 south-southeast of Dnepropetrovsk
16	5 May 1943	07:38? (Note: According to Mathews and Foreman claimed at 07:32.)	LaGG-3*	PQ 34 Ost 85161 west of Eriwanskaja	58	23 September 1943	14:07	Il-2 m.H.	PQ 34 Ost 58993; PQ 58193; 15 km (9.3 mi) east-southeast of Zaporizhia
17	6 May 1943	05:15	Il-2 m.H.	PQ 34 Ost 75241; PQ 75291 vicinity of Neberdshajewskaja	59	25 September 1943	15:03	LaGG-3*	PQ 34 Ost 58672; 10 km (6.2 mi) northwest of Bolschoj-Tokmak
18	8 May 1943	16:05	Spitfire	PQ 34 Ost 85113, east of Krymskaja east of Krymsk	60	25 September 1943	15:05	LaGG-3*	PQ 34 Ost 58673; 10 km (6.2 mi) northwest of Bolschoj-Tokmak
19	9 May 1943	07:20	LaGG-3*	PQ 34 Ost 75262 south of Krymsk	61	26 September 1943	06:51	P-39	PQ 34 Ost 58673; 10 km (6.2 mi) northwest of Bolschoj-Tokmak
20	11 May 1943	06:29	LaGG-3*	PQ 34 Ost 85152, north of Abinskaja east of Sorin	62	26 September 1943	07:10	Il-2* (Note: According to Barbas claimed as an Ilyushin Il-2 with rear gunner (mit Heckschütze).)	PQ 34 Ost 58331; PQ 58531; 15 km (9.3 mi) southwest of Zaporizhia
21	11 May 1943	06:40	LaGG-3*	PQ 34 Ost 86112 north of Mertschanskaja	63	27 September 1943	14:15	LaGG-3*	PQ 34 Ost 58192; 15 km (9.3 mi) east-southeast of Zaporizhia
22	22 May 1943	09:25	LaGG-3*	PQ 34 Ost 85563 over sea, south of Gelendzhik	64	29 September 1943	14:10	Il-2 m.H.	PQ 34 Ost 58672, Bolschoj Tokmak; 10 km (6.2 mi) northwest of Bolschoj-Tokmak
23	26 May 1943	13:19	LaGG-3*	PQ 34 Ost 76861 north of Kessjetowa	65	30 September 1943	11:23	P-39	PQ 34 Ost 58564, northeast of Michailowka vicinity of Kalinowka
24	26 May 1943	16:05	LaGG-3*	PQ 34 Ost 76894 vicinity of Kijewakoje	66	1 October 1943	06:50	LaGG-3	PQ 34 Ost 58674; 10 km (6.2 mi) northwest of Bolschoj-Tokmak
25	27 May 1943	06:35	LaGG-3*	PQ 34 Ost 85113, east of Krymskaja east of Krymsk	67	1 October 1943	07:20	Il-2 m.H.	PQ 34 Ost 58133; 20 km (12 mi) northeast of Zaporizhia
26	28 May 1943	12:12	LaGG-3*	PQ 34 Ost 76894 vicinity of Kijewakoje	68	1 October 1943	12:25	LaGG-3	PQ 34 Ost 58561 vicinity of Kalinowka
27	3 August 1943	08:45	Il-2 m.H.	PQ 35 Ost 61293; 25 km (16 mi) southeast of Prochorowka	69	3 October 1943	08:23	LaGG-3	PQ 34 Ost 58153 northeast of Zaporizhia
28	3 August 1943	18:39	LaGG-3*	PQ 35 Ost 61194; 10 km (6.2 mi) east of Krasnyi Lyman	70	3 October 1943	16:12	LaGG-3	PQ 34 Ost 58583; 20 km (12 mi) northwest of Beloserka
29	4 August 1943	04:48	LaGG-3*	PQ 35 Ost 61332, northwest of Belgorod; 10 km (6.2 mi) north of Tomarovka	71	4 October 1943	11:45	LaGG-3	PQ 34 Ost 58672, Bolschoj Tokmak; 10 km (6.2 mi) northwest of Bolschoj-Tokmak
30	4 August 1943	10:55	Il-2	PQ 35 Ost 61154; 10 km (6.2 mi) north of Krasnyi Lyman	72	6 October 1943	07:10	P-39	PQ 34 Ost 58674; 10 km (6.2 mi) northwest of Bolschoj-Tokmak
31	4 August 1943	15:15	Il-2 m.H.	PQ 34 Ost 61624; 20 km (12 mi) southeast of Belgorod	73	7 October 1943	07:44	LaGG-3	PQ 34 Ost 49173; 55 km (34 mi) east-northeast of Myronivka
32	5 August 1943	09:43	LaGG-3*	PQ 35 Ost 61412; 15 km (9.3 mi) north of Belgorod	74	7 October 1943	11:10	LaGG-3	PQ 34 Ost 49322, west of Schulgowka; 60 km (37 mi) west-northwest of Dnepropetrovsk
33	7 August 1943	08:46	LaGG-3*	PQ 35 Ost 51612; 10 km (6.2 mi) west of Grayvoron	75	7 October 1943	11:15	LaGG-3	PQ 34 Ost 49321; 60 km (37 mi) west-northwest of Dnepropetrovsk
34	8 August 1943	15:00	LaGG-3*	PQ 35 Ost 61532; 15 km (9.3 mi) southwest of Belgorod	76	8 October 1943	06:40	LaGG-3	PQ 34 Ost 49321; 60 km (37 mi) west-northwest of Dnepropetrovsk
35	9 August 1943	05:35	LaGG-3*	PQ 35 Ost 61652; 15 km (9.3 mi) northwest of Vovchansk	77	8 October 1943	13:06	LaGG-3	PQ 34 Ost 58683; 5 km (3.1 mi) north of Bolschoj-Tokmak
36	9 August 1943	05:39	LaGG-3*	PQ 35 Ost 61633; PQ 61639; 15 km (9.3 mi) north of Vovchansk	78	10 October 1943	06:00	Il-2 m.H.	PQ 34 Ost 58164, east of Zaporizhia; 20 km (12 mi) east of Zaporizhia
37	14 August 1943	14:52	Pe-2	PQ 35 Ost 60163; 15 km (9.3 mi) east-southeast of Kharkiv	79	28 November 1943	14:35	LaGG-3	PQ 34 Ost 48644; 20 km (12 mi) south-southeast of Nikopol
38	19 August 1943	09:32	LaGG-3*	PQ 34 Ost 88263; 10 km (6.2 mi) east of Marinowka	80	7 December 1943	13:53	Il-2 m.H.	north of Nowa Praha north Nowaja Praga
39	19 August 1943	11:38	LaGG-3*	PQ 34 Ost 88254, Kalinowka vicinity of Dmitrijewka	81	17 December 1943	13:45	Boston	northeast of Losowatka northeast of Losowatka
40	19 August 1943	11:44	LaGG-3*	PQ 34 Ost 88281; 5 km (3.1 mi) southwest of Jalisawehino	82	19 December 1943	12:10	Il-2 m.H.	south of Nowo-Dnjeprowka
– 8. Staffel of Jagdgeschwader 52 – Eastern Front — 1 January – 31 December 1944
83	7 January 1944	11:35	P-39	PQ 34 Ost 39763; 20 km (12 mi) west-southwest of Perekop	94	15 April 1944	16:15	LaGG	PQ 34 Ost 35651; Laspi Bight; Black Sea, 3 km (1.9 mi) south of Laspi Bight
84	15 January 1944	10:30	Il-2	PQ 34 Ost 19494; 25 km (16 mi) west of Kirovograd	95	15 April 1944	16:18	Il-2 m.H.	PQ 34 Ost 35311; Black Sea, 35 km (22 mi) west-northwest of Sevastopol
85	23 January 1944	10:30	P-39	PQ 34 Ost 38824; 45 km (28 mi) south of Apostolove	96	17 April 1944	15:30	LaGG	PQ 34 Ost 35451; Dzhankoi
86	30 January 1944	12:02	LaGG	PQ 34 Ost 19152; 25 km (16 mi) south-southwest of Signajewka	97	27 June 1944	19:40	Pe-2	PQ 25 Ost 95243
87	1 February 1944	07:28	LaGG	PQ 34 Ost 19274; 25 km (16 mi) south-southeast of Signajewka	98	7 July 1944	10:30? (Note: According to Barbas, Mathews and Foreman claimed at 15:15.)	LaGG	PQ 25 Ost 55393; 45 km (28 mi) east of Otopeni
88	1 February 1944	10:06	LaGG	PQ 34 Ost 19134; 10 km (6.2 mi) south-southwest of Signajewka	99	19 July 1944	14:45	P-39	PQ 25 Ost 42552; 25 km (16 mi) northwest of Liuboml
89	26 February 1944	12:02	Pe-2	PQ 34 Ost 19452; 30 km (19 mi) west-northwest of Kirovograd	100	21 July 1944	18:58	P-39	PQ 25 Ost 31876; 20 km (12 mi) south of Rawa Ruska
90	14 March 1944	15:34	LaGG	PQ 25 Ost 70543; 15 km (9.3 mi) southeast of Balakleya	101	24 July 1944	18:28	LaGG	PQ 25 Ost 30694; 5 km (3.1 mi) northeast of Stryj
91	21 March 1944	16:21	LaGG	PQ 25 Ost 70551; 20 km (12 mi) north of Izium	102	12 August 1944	14:04	LaGG	PQ 25 Ost 11383; 25 km (16 mi) north-northwest of Mielec
92	31 March 1944	15:53? (Note: According to Mathews and Foreman claimed at 05:53.)	LaGG	PQ 25 51783; 10 km (6.2 mi) southeast of Brody	103	17 August 1944	12:44	P-39	PQ 25 Ost 11474; 20 km (12 mi) southwest of Sandomierz
93? (Note: This claim is not listed by Barbas, nor by Mathews and Foreman.)	3 April 1944	15:53	LaGG	PQ 25 Ost 51783	104	22 August 1944	15:20	P-39	PQ 25 Ost 11417; 15 km (9.3 mi) west of Sandomierz
? (Note: This claim is not listed by Prien, Stemmer, Balke and Bock.)	4 April 1944	14:03	LaGG	PQ 50674; 25 km (16 mi) south of Ternopol	105	22 August 1944	15:33	LaGG	PQ 25 Ost 11287; 10 km (6.2 mi) north of Sandomierz
– 10. Staffel of Jagdgeschwader 52 – Eastern Front — 1 January – 31 December 1944
106	26 August 1944	10:45	Il-2 m.H.	PQ 25 Ost 11189; 10 km (6.2 mi) west of Opatów	110	2 September 1944	14:09	La-5*	PQ 25 Ost 11197 vicinity of Opatów
107	27 August 1944	15:24	Il-2 m.H.	PQ 25 Ost 11319; 25 km (16 mi) southwest of Opatów	111	15 October 1944	10:48	LaGG	PQ 25 Ost 26759; PQ 20759; 45 km (28 mi) south of Sanok
108	31 August 1944	18:33	LaGG	PQ 25 Ost 11321; 15 km (9.3 mi) south-southwest of Opatów	112	25 October 1944	14:59	Il-2 m.H.	PQ 25 Ost 25599; 25 km (16 mi) west-northwest of Prahovo
109	1 September 1944	11:15	Il-2	PQ 25 Ost 11389; PQ 11385; 15 km (9.3 mi) south-southwest of Opatów					
According to Prien, Stemmer, Balke and Bock, Obleser claimed two undocumented aerial victories after 31 October 1944, his 113th and 114th aerial victories. These claims are not listed by Barbas, nor by Mathews and Foreman.

=== Awards ===
- Iron Cross (1939) 2nd and 1st Class
- Honor Goblet of the Luftwaffe on 8 November 1943 as Leutnant in the 8./Jagdgeschwader 52
- German Cross in Gold on 14 November 1943 as Leutnant in the III./Jagdgeschwader 52
- Knight's Cross of the Iron Cross on 23 March 1944 as Leutnant and Staffelführer of the 8./Jagdgeschwader 52 (Note: According to Scherzer on 26 March 1944.)
- Order of Merit of the Federal Republic of Germany
  - Officer's Cross (April 1973)
  - Commanders Cross (26 September 1979)
  - Grand Cross with Star (4 March 1983)

== Notes ==
=== Discrepancies in claimed aircraft type ===
Military offices
Preceded by Oberstleutnant Erich Hohagen	Commander of Jagdgeschwader 72; 1 November 1961 – 19 December 1963	Succeeded by Oberstleutnant Benno Schmieder
Preceded by Oberstleutnant Wilhelm Meyn	Commander of Jagdbombergeschwader 31 Boelcke; December 1963 – November 1966	Succeeded by Oberst Paul Monreal
Preceded by Generalleutnant Gerhard Limberg	Inspector of the Air Force; 1 October 1978 – 31 March 1983	Succeeded by Generalleutnant Eberhard Eimler
