= Rudel =

Rudel is a surname. Notable people with the surname include:

- Hans-Ulrich Rudel (1916–1982), highly decorated German pilot during World War II and post-war neo-Nazi activist
- Jaufre Rudel (died in or after 1147), Prince of Blaye and a troubadour
- Julius Rudel (1921–2014), Austrian-born American opera and orchestra conductor
- Wulgrin II of Angoulême (c. 1089–1140), called Rudel, possibly the father or father-in-law of Jaufre Rudel

Fictional characters:

- Hanna Rudel, a fictional character from the anime/manga series Strike Witches

Computing:

- Rudel is a plugin for the GNU Emacs text editor allowing collaborative real-time editing using the Obby protocol.

== See also ==
- Günther Rüdel (1883–1950), German general in the Luftwaffe during World War II
- Rudel Scandal, a 1976 political scandal involving Hans-Ulrich Rudel
- Rudel "Rudy" Miller (1900–1994), American college athlete and professional baseball player
- Rudl, a Norwegian folk dance
