= Eberhard Eimler =

German Air Force general (1930–2022)

- Born: 30 November 1930; Ulm, Free People's State of Württemberg, Weimar Republic
- Died: 17 December 2022 (aged 92)
- Burial place: Rheinbach, North Rhine-Westphalia, Germany
- Education: Bundeswehr Command and Staff College
- Military career
- Allegiance: West Germany
- Branch: West German Air Force
- Service years: 1956–1990
- Rank: General
- Commands: Deputy Supreme Allied Commander Europe; Inspector of the Air Force; Light Combat Squadron 42
- Awards: Order of Merit of the Federal Republic of Germany

Eberhard Eimler (30 November 1930 – 17 December 2022) was a German general who served as the Inspector of the Air Force from 1983 to 1987 and a Deputy Supreme Allied Commander Europe from 1987 until his retirement in 1990. He began his service as a pilot in the West German Air Force in 1956, shortly after the Bundeswehr was established. Eimler became the first Bundeswehr general who did not have military service in World War II.

== Early life and education ==
Eberhard Eimler was born on 30 November 1930. In 1945 Eimler delivered food from East Prussia to the construction sites of Nazi Germany's Ostwall. He later became an electrician before studying electrical engineering at a university. During his studies he worked for the office of a U.S. travel agency in Ulm.

== Military career ==
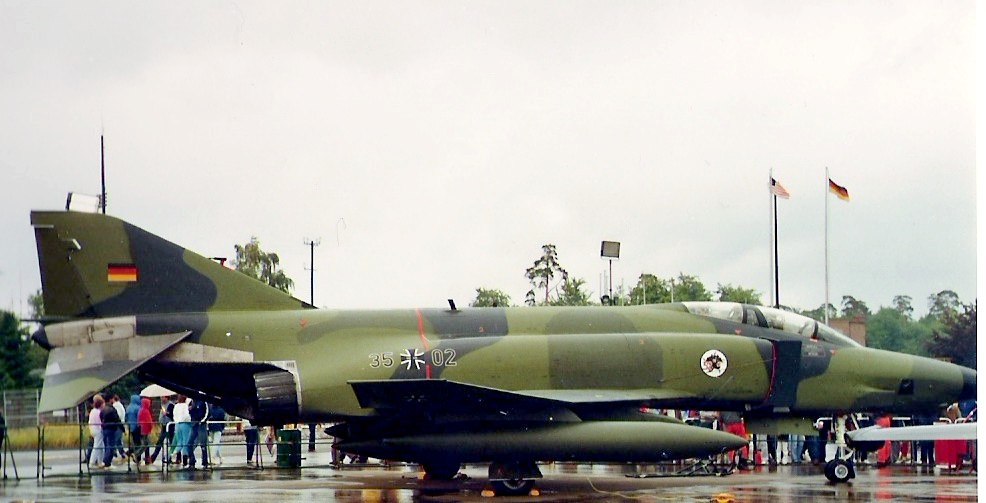
A West German Air Force F-4 Phantom, a type flown by Eimler

He volunteered for the West German Air Force in 1956 because he had a passion for flying, and refused the government's attempt to place him in the Navy instead. He was among the first members of the Bundeswehr after the war, and received training from American, British, and Canadian NATO personnel. Eimler was trained as an officer, pilot, and flight instructor, flying the Fiat G.91, the McDonnell Douglas F-4 Phantom, and the Transall C-160. He received staff officer training at the Bundeswehr Command and Staff College.

He worked at West Germany's Federal Ministry of Defense in Bonn, serving as an adjutant to the Inspector General of the Air Force, Johannes Steinhoff, from 1968 to 1970. In 1971, he became commander of Light Combat Squadron 42, which was equipped with the Fiat G.91. The unit was noted to be in "very good" condition during his tenure as commander and he became a candidate for promotion to general officer.

In March 1976, he was promoted to brigadier general, becoming the youngest general officer in the Bundeswehr and the first to not have military service in World War II. In October 1980, at age 49, Eimler was promoted to lieutenant general and was made deputy commander of Allied Air Forces Central Europe at Ramstein Air Base. On 1 April 1983 Eimler was made Inspector of the Air Force by Defense Minister Hans Apel. During his tenure, the G.91 was replaced in the West German Air Force by the Alpha Jet, and the operational readiness of F-4 Phantoms was improved. Eimler initiated the development of the Tornado ECR, and obtained the political support of Chancellor Helmut Kohl for the Tactical Combat Aircraft in 1983, which eventually became the Eurofighter Typhoon.

On 28 August 1987, he was appointed as a Deputy Supreme Allied Commander Europe at NATO headquarters in Mons, Belgium. Eimler became the fourth four-star general in the West German Air Force, and was awarded the Grand Cross with the Star of the Order of Merit of the Federal Republic of Germany. He retired on 30 September 1990, shortly before the end of the Cold War.

== Post-military ==
In 1993, Eimler was investigated in a suspected bribery case based on the owner of a company working on a new military aircraft, Grob G 520, sending him to his vacation home in Brazil. He denied any wrongdoing.

Eimler gave a speech at the 60th anniversary celebration of the Air Force in September 2016. He died on 17 December 2022, aged 92, and a received a funeral with full military honors from the Air Force on 6 January 2023 in Rheinbach.

Military offices
Preceded by Friedrich Obleser	Inspector of the German Air Force; 1983–1987	Succeeded by Horst Jungkurth
Preceded by Hans-Joachim Mack	Deputy Supreme Allied Commander Europe; With Sir John Akehurst; 1987–1990	Succeeded by Dieter Clauss
