= Air Force Command (Germany) =

Air Force Command — XXXX —
- Kommando Luftwaffe (Kdo Lw)
- Insignia
- Active: 1 October 2012
- Country: Germany
- Branch: German Air Force
- Type: High command
- Garrison/HQ: Gatow

Commanders
- Inspector of the Air Force: Lieutenant General Holger Neumann
- Deputy Inspector of the Air Force: Lieutenant General Ansgar Rieks
- Chief of Staff: Major General Wolfgang Ohl

The Air Force Command (German: Kommando Luftwaffe, Kdo Lw) is the high command of the German Air Force of the Bundeswehr as well as the staff of the Inspector of the Air Force. It was formed in 2012, as a merger of the German Air Staff (Führungsstab der Luftwaffe) with parts of the Air Force Office (Luftwaffenamt), and the Air Force Forces Command (Luftwaffenführungskommando), as part of a larger reorganization of the Bundeswehr. The headquarters of the command are in Gatow, Berlin, but some of the staff is dislocated in Cologne.

== Subordinate Units ==
- Air Component Command in Kalkar
- Air Force Forces Command (Luftwaffentruppenkommando) in Cologne
