= Inspector of the Air Force (Germany) =

Commander of the modern German Air Force

Inspector of the German Air Force
- Inspekteur der Luftwaffe
- Standard of the Inspector of the Air Force
- Incumbent; Generalleutnant Holger Neumann since 27 May 2025
- Federal Minister of Defence
- Abbreviation: InspL
- Reports to: General Inspector of the Bundeswehr
- Precursor: Oberkommando der Luftwaffe
- Formation: 1 June 1957
- First holder: Josef Kammhuber

The Inspector of the Air Force (German: Inspekteur der Luftwaffe) is the commander of the Air Force of the modern-day German Armed Forces, the Bundeswehr. The Inspector is responsible for the readiness of personnel and materiel in the German Air Force, in that function reports directly to the Federal Minister of Defence. The current Inspector is Holger Neumann, appointed on 27 May 2025.

The Inspector of the Air Force is the chief of the Air Force Command, based in Gatow, Berlin. They sit under the General Inspector of the Bundeswehr and are a member of the Defence Council for Bundeswehr-wide matters. Both the Inspector and their deputy hold the rank of lieutenant general (German: Generalleutnant) while in office, although the first Inspector, Josef Kammhuber, was an exception, holding the rank of full general as a reward for his efforts to build up a new German Luftwaffe.

== List of Inspectors of the Air Force ==
No.	Portrait	Inspector of the Air Force	Took office	Left office	Time in office
1	Josef Kammhuber	General; Josef Kammhuber (1896–1986)	1 June 1957	30 September 1962	5 years, 121 days
2	Werner Panitzki	Lieutenant General; Werner Panitzki (1911–2000)	1 October 1962	25 August 1966	3 years, 328 days
3	Johannes Steinhoff	Lieutenant General; Johannes Steinhoff (1913–1994)	2 September 1966	31 December 1970	4 years, 120 days
4	Günther Rall	Lieutenant General; Günther Rall (1918–2009)	1 January 1971	31 March 1974	3 years, 89 days
5	Gerhard Limberg	Lieutenant General; Gerhard Limberg (1920–2006)	1 April 1974	30 September 1978	4 years, 182 days
6	Friedrich Obleser	Lieutenant General; Friedrich Obleser (1923–2004)	1 October 1978	30 March 1983	4 years, 180 days
7	Eberhard Eimler	Lieutenant General; Eberhard Eimler (born 1930)	1 April 1983	30 September 1987	4 years, 182 days
8	Horst Jungkurth [de]	Lieutenant General; Horst Jungkurth (born 1933)	1 October 1987	31 March 1991	3 years, 181 days
9	Jörg Kuebart	Lieutenant General; Jörg Kuebart (1934–2018)	1 April 1991	30 September 1994	3 years, 182 days
10	Bernhard Mende [de]	Lieutenant General; Bernhard Mende (1937–2004)	1 October 1994	30 September 1997	2 years, 364 days
11	Rolf Portz [de]	Lieutenant General; Rolf Portz (born 1940)	1 October 1997	31 March 2001	3 years, 181 days
12	Gerhard W. Back [de]	Lieutenant General; Gerhard W. Back (born 1944)	1 April 2001	11 January 2004	2 years, 285 days
13	Klaus-Peter Stieglitz [de]	Lieutenant General; Klaus-Peter Stieglitz (born 1947)	12 January 2004	29 October 2009	5 years, 290 days
14	Aarne Kreuzinger-Janik	Lieutenant General; Aarne Kreuzinger-Janik (born 1950)	29 October 2009	25 April 2012	2 years, 179 days
15	Karl Müllner	Lieutenant General; Karl Müllner (born 1956)	25 April 2012	29 May 2018	6 years, 34 days
16	Ingo Gerhartz	Lieutenant General; Ingo Gerhartz (born 1965)	29 May 2018	27 May 2025	6 years, 363 days
17	Holger Neumann [de]	Lieutenant General; Holger Neumann (born 1968)	27 May 2025	Incumbent	1 year, 171 days
