= Gerhard Limberg =

German Air Force general

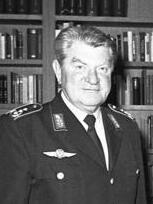
- Born: 7 July 1920
- Died: 23 March 2006 (aged 85)
- Military career
- Allegiance: Germany
- Branch: German Air Force
- Rank: Generalleutnant
- Commands: Inspector of the Air Force

Gerhard Limberg (7 July 1920 – 23 March 2006) was a general in the Air Force of West Germany. He was Inspector of the Air Force, the senior air force appointment, from 1974 to 1978.

== Awards ==
- German Cross in Gold on 20 March 1944 as Leutnant in the III./Schlachtgeschwader 4

Military offices
Preceded by Oberstleutnant Karl Henze	Commander of JaboG 35/LeKG 41; October 1963 – February 1968	Succeeded by Oberst Dieter Hein
Preceded by Generalmajor Walter Krupinski	Commander of 3. Luftwaffendivision (Bundeswehr); 1 October 1971 – 30 September 1972	Succeeded by Generalmajor Ernst-Dieter Bernhard
Preceded by Generalleutnant Günther Rall	Inspector of the Air Force; 1 April 1974 – 30 September 1978	Succeeded by Generalleutnant Friedrich Obleser
