= John Akehurst (British Army officer) =

British Army general (1930–2007)

General Sir John Akehurst KCB CBE
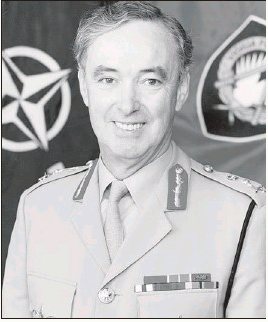
- Born: 12 February 1930; Chatham, Kent, England
- Died: 20 February 2007 (aged 77)
- Military career
- Allegiance: United Kingdom
- Branch: British Army
- Service years: 1947–1990
- Rank: General
- Service number: 407732
- Commands: Deputy Supreme Allied Commander Europe; UK Field Army; Staff College, Camberley; 4th Armoured Division; Dhofar Brigade; 2nd Battalion Royal Anglian Regiment
- Conflicts: Malayan Emergency; Dhofar Rebellion
- Awards: Knight Commander of the Order of the Bath; Commander of the Order of the British Empire; Mentioned in Despatches

General Sir John Bryan Akehurst, KCB, CBE (12 February 1930 – 20 February 2007) was a British Army officer who rose to be Deputy Supreme Allied Commander Europe.

== Military career ==
Educated at Cranbrook School and the Royal Military Academy, Sandhurst, John Akehurst was commissioned into the Northamptonshire Regiment in 1949. He was seconded to the Malay Regiment in 1952 during the Malayan Emergency. He was appointed commanding officer of 2nd Battalion Royal Anglian Regiment in 1968.

In 1974 he commanded the Dhofar Brigade of the Sultan of Oman's Armed Forces against a communist-inspired armed insurrection during the Dhofar Rebellion. It reached a peak in the autumn of 1975 when he successfully launched an attack from the mountain garrison of Sarfait on the border, although at Christmas 1975 his helicopter was attacked by guerrillas.

He spent two years as deputy military secretary from 1976 to 1978 and then became general officer commanding 4th Armoured Division in 1979. In 1982 he was appointed commandant of the Staff College, Camberley, and in 1984 he became commander of the UK Field Army. His final appointment was as Deputy Supreme Allied Commander Europe in 1987; he retired in 1990.

== Family ==
In 1955 he married Shirley Anne Webb. Their two children died in childhood from cystic fibrosis. Lady Akehurst died on 31 December 2020 at the age of 85.

== Bibliography ==
- We Won a War: The Campaign in Oman 1965–1975 by John Akehurst, Russell Publishing, 1982, ISBN 978-0-85955-091-8
- Generally Speaking: Then Hurrah for the life of a Soldier by John Akehurst. Published by Michael Russell Publishing Ltd, 1999, ISBN 978-0859552530

Military offices
Preceded by Richard Vickers	GOC 4th Armoured Division; 1979–1981	Succeeded by Jeremy Reilly
Preceded by David Alexander-Sinclair	Commandant of the Staff College, Camberley; 1982–1984	Succeeded by Patrick Palmer
Honorary titles
Preceded by Sir Timothy Creasey	Colonel of the Royal Anglian Regiment; 1986−1991	Succeeded by Patrick Stone
Military offices
Preceded by Sir Edward Burgess	Commander UK Field Army; 1984–1987	Succeeded by Sir David Ramsbotham
Preceded by Sir Edward Burgess	Deputy Supreme Allied Commander Europe; With Eberhard Eimler; 1987–1990	Succeeded by Sir Brian Kenny
