= Jörg Kuebart =

German Air Force general (1934–2018)

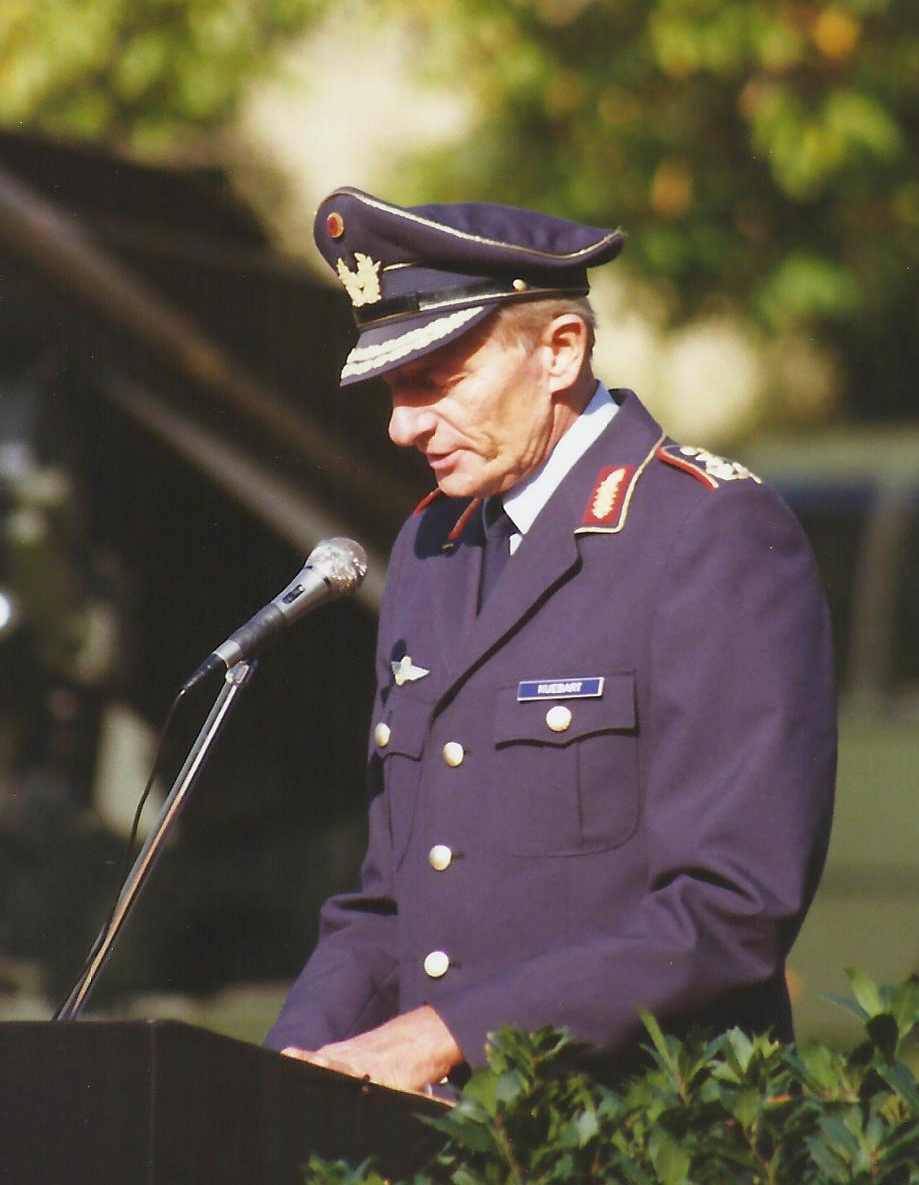
- Born: 2 September 1934; Allenstein, East Prussia (today Olsztyn, Poland)
- Died: 14 February 2018 (aged 83); Bad Honnef, Germany
- Military career
- Allegiance: Germany
- Branch: German Air Force
- Service years: 1956–94
- Rank: Generalleutnant
- Commands: Jagdbombergeschwader 34; 4 Luftwaffendivision

Jörg Kuebart (2 September 1934 – 14 February 2018) was a German general of the German Air Force. He served as Inspector of the Air Force in 1991–94.

Jörg Kuebart was born in Allenstein, East Prussia (today Olsztyn, Poland). His family was expelled from his hometown after World War II. Kuebart joined the Bundesgrenzschutz in 1955 and the Bundeswehr in 1956, where he initially was trained as a tank commander. In 1957 he changed over to the air force and was trained as a pilot at Landsberg am Lech and Fürstenfeldbruck on the T-6 Texan, the F-84 Thunderjet and the Lockheed T-33. His brother Bernd also served in the air force and was one of four Lockheed F-104 Starfighter pilots killed on 16 June 1962.

In 1958–64 Kuebart served as a pilot and squadron commander at the Jagdbombergeschwader 33 in Büchel. Promoted a Hauptmann he received his General Staff Training at the Führungsakademie der Bundeswehr in 1964–66. In 1968–72 Kuebart commanded the Jagdbombergeschwader 34 "Allgäu" and was promoted to an Oberst. In 1972–74 he served as a department director at the Luftflottenkommando in Cologne and in 1977 he became the German Military attaché in Madrid and in 1979, by then a Brigadegeneral, in London.

After his return to Germany he became a Generalmajor and the commander of the 4. Luftwaffendivision in Aurich and a Generalleutnant and Commanding General of the Luftwaffenführungskommando in Cologne-Wahn. 1989–91 Kuebart served as the Deputy Commander and Chief of Staff of Allied Air Forces Central Europe.

On 1 April 1991 Kuebart became Germany's Inspector of the Air Force, a position he held until his retirement on 30 September 1994. After his retirement, from 29 September 2000 to 6 October 2006, he served as president of the Gemeinschaft der Jagdflieger, a German veterans organization.

Jörg Kuebart was married and had three sons.

Military offices
Preceded by Generalleutnant Fritz Wegner	Commanding General of Air Force Forces Command; 1 April 1983 – 31 March 1989	Succeeded by Generalleutnant Walter Schmitz
Preceded by Generalleutnant Horst Jungkurth	Inspector of the Air Force; 1991–1994	Succeeded by Generalleutnant Bernhard Mende
