= Jeremy Reilly =

British Army officer (1934–2017)

Lieutenant-General Sir Jeremy Reilly KCB DSO
- Born: Jeremy Calcott Reilly; 7 April 1934
- Died: 1 January 2017 (aged 82)
- Allegiance: United Kingdom
- Branch: British Army
- Service years: 1954–1989
- Rank: Lieutenant-General
- Commands: 2nd Bn Royal Regiment of Fusiliers; 6th Field force and UK Mobile Force; 4th Armoured Division
- Awards: Knight Commander of the Order of the Bath; Distinguished Service Order

Lieutenant-General Sir Jeremy Calcott Reilly KCB DSO (7 April 1934 – 1 January 2017) was a British Army officer who commanded 4th Armoured Division.

== Military career ==
After an early childhood in India, he was educated at Uppingham School and the Royal Military Academy Sandhurst, Reilly was commissioned into the Royal Warwickshire Regiment in 1954. He was given command of the 2nd Battalion Royal Regiment of Fusiliers in 1971 and served in Northern Ireland during the Troubles, often being interviewed on TV. Reilly worked with local community representatives to undermine the IRA and was a formidable opponent in north and west Belfast for that organisation. He was subsequently appointed an instructor at the Staff College, Camberley in 1974, Commander of 6th Field Force and the UK Mobile Force in 1979 and General Officer Commanding 4th Armoured Division in 1981. He went on to lead the Directorate of Business Delivery at the Ministry of Defence in 1983, to become Assistant Chief of Defence Staff at the Ministry of Defence in 1985 and to be Commander for Training and Arms Directors in 1986 before he retired in 1989.

== Personal life ==
In 1960 he married Julia Elizabeth Forrester; they had three daughters. He died on 1 January 2017 at the age of 82.

Military offices
Preceded by John Akehurst	General Officer Commanding the 4th Armoured Division; 1981–1983	Succeeded by John Waters
