= Carl-Heinz Greve =

German general in the Bundeswehr

- Born: 17 October 1920
- Died: 21 May 1998 (aged 77)
- Military career
- Allegiance: Nazi Germany; West Germany
- Branch: Luftwaffe; German Air Force
- Rank: Generalleutnant
- Conflicts: World War II
- Awards: Knight's Cross of the Iron Cross

Carl-Heinz Antonius Greve (17 October 1920 – 21 May 1998) was a German general in the Bundeswehr. During World War II, he served in the Luftwaffe and was a recipient of the Knight's Cross of the Iron Cross of Nazi Germany.

== Awards and decorations ==
- Knight's Cross of the Iron Cross on 7 October 1942 as Leutnant and pilot in the 3./Kampfgruppe 606
- Order of Merit of the Federal Republic of Germany
  - Merit Cross 1st Class (15 May 1973)
  - Great Cross of Merit (30 November 1974)

Military offices
Preceded by Generalmajor Hans Asmus	Commander of 1. Luftwaffendivision (Bundeswehr); 1 October 1970 – 30 September 1974	Succeeded by Generalmajor Wolfgang Bergh
