= Air Force Office (Germany) =

- Active: 1 May 1956–30 June 2013
- Country: Germany
- Branch: German Air Force
- Type: High command authority
- Headquarters: Köln
- Motto(s): Leistungsfähig, kompetent, zukunftsorientiert

Commanders
- Notable commanders: Friedrich Obleser; Helmut Mahlke

The Air Force Office (German: Luftwaffenamt, LwA) was a high command authority of the German Air Force of the Bundeswehr, responsible for the conceptual planning as well as the training, supply, and equipment of the Air Force. In 2013, it was disbanded after its functions were merged into the new Air Force Command (Kommando Luftwaffe), along with those of the other high command bodies of the German Air Force.

In addition to the Air Force Office and Air Force Forces Command, a number of their subordinate units were disbanded, including the Air Force Training Command.

The subordinate elements of the Air Force Office were:

- Surgeon General of the Air Force
- Bundeswehr Air Traffic Services Office
- Air Force Support Group (supporting the Air Force Forces Command and Air Force Office)
- Legal Advisor Center
- Air Force Training Command
  - Air Force Officer School
  - Air Force Non-Commissioned Officer School
  - Air Force Technical School 1 (with Air Force Bands 1 and 2)
  - Air Force Technical School 3 (with Air Force Bands 3 and 4)
  - Air Force Training Regiment
  - Air Force Specialized Schools
- German Air Force Command United States/ Canada
  - Air Force Flying Training Center, United States, Holloman AFB
  - 2nd German Air Force Training Squadron, NAS Pensacola
  - 3rd German Air Force Training Squadron, Goodyear Airport
  - German participation in Euro NATO Joint Jet Pilot Training (ENJJPT), Sheppard AFB
  - Air Force Tactical Training Center Air Defense Missiles, Fort Bliss
- Air Force Weapon Systems Command
  - Maintenance Regiment 1
    - Avionics Center
    - Aircraft Technology Center
  - Maintenance Regiment 2
    - Maintenance Group 21
    - Maintenance Group 22
    - Maintenance Group 25
    - Air Defense Missile Center
  - Weapon Systems Support Center
