= Rudel Scandal =

1976 political scandal in Germany

The Rudel Scandal of 1976 (German: Rudel-Affäre) was a political scandal in Germany which concerned the way the German Armed Forces dealt with the traditions of the Wehrmacht.

In the spring of 1976, businessman and former Nazi Germany's Luftwaffe flying ace Hans-Ulrich Rudel, who had returned from Paraguay was invited by high-ranking Bundeswehr officers to a veterans' reunion of the Aufklärungsgeschwader 51 "Immelmann". Rudel had earlier been a leading member of the German Reich Party, and was considered persona non grata by the Ministry of Defense because of his undiminished admiration of Adolf Hitler. He was invited only after an intervention by the opposition's spokesman for Defense, Manfred Wörner, and attended as the last commander of Schlachtgeschwader 2 "Immelmann".

Present at the meeting, where Rudel signed his books and gave autographs to soldiers, were the German Air Force generals Karl Heinz Franke and Walter Krupinski. Later, the generals publicly compared Rudel's past as a Nazi and Neo-Nazi supporter to the career of prominent Social Democrat leader Herbert Wehner, who had been a member of the German Communist Party in the 1930s and who had lived in Moscow during World War II, where he was allegedly involved in NKVD operations. Calling Wehner an extremist, they described Rudel as an honourable man who "hadn't stolen the family silver or anything else".

When these remarks became public, the Federal Minister of Defense Georg Leber ordered the generals into early retirement as of 1 November 1976. Leber, however, a member of the Social Democratic Party of Germany (SPD), was heavily criticised for his actions by the Christian Democratic Union (CDU) opposition, and the scandal contributed to the minister's retirement in early 1978.
