= Ugrim =

Ugrim Угрим
- Khutor
- Location within Belgorod Oblast Location within Russia
- Coordinates: 50°32′N 36°22′E
- Country: Russia
- Region: Belgorod Oblast
- District: Belgorodsky District
- Time zone: UTC+3:00

Ugrim (Russian: Угрим) is a rural locality (a khutor) in Belgorodsky District, Belgorod Oblast, Russia. The population was 48 as of 2010. There are 5 streets.

== Geography ==
Ugrim is located 8 km northwest of Maysky (the district's administrative centre) by road. Dolbino is the nearest rural locality.
