= Air Force Forces Command (Germany) =

- German: Luftwaffenführungskommando, LwFüKdo
- Active: 1 October 1970 – 30 June 2013
- Country: Germany
- Branch: German Air Force
- Type: High command authority
- Size: 450 (staff)
- Headquarters: Köln

The Air Force Forces Command (German: Luftwaffenführungskommando, LwFüKdo), previously the Air Fleet Command (German: Luftflottenkommando) from 1970 to 2001, was a high command authority of the German Air Force of the Bundeswehr, responsible for the operations of the Air Force. In 2013, it was disbanded after its functions were merged into the new Air Force Command (Kommando Luftwaffe), along with those of the other high command bodies of the German Air Force.

Its subordinate elements were:

- Air Force Operations Command
  - German Joint Force Air Component Command Headquarters (JFAC HQ)
- National Air Defense Command Center
- German Space Situational Awareness Center
- Air Force Support Command
- 1st Air Division in Southern Germany
- 2nd Air Division in Eastern Germany
- 4th Air Division in Western Germany
- Air Command and Control Section 1
- Air Command and Control Section 3
- Air Command and Control Section 2
- Surface-to-Air Missile Wing 5
  - SAM Battalion 22
  - SAM Battalion 23
- Surface-to-Air Missile Wing 2
  - SAM Battalion 21
  - SAM Battalion 24
- Surface-to-Air Missile Wing 1
  - SAM Battalion 25
  - SAM Battalion 26
- Air Transport Wing 61 (disbanded 31 December 2017)
- Air Transport Wing 62
- Air Transport Wing 63 (disbanded December 2021)
- Helicopter Wing 64
- Special Air Mission Wing
- Fighter-Bomber Wing 31 “Boelcke”
- Fighter-Bomber Wing 33
- Fighter Wing 73 "Steinhoff"
- Fighter Wing 74
- Reconnaissance Wing 51 "Immelmann"
- German Air Force Tactical Training Center Italy
- Air Force Regiment "Friesland"
