= 131st Fighter Squadron =

Unit of the Massachusetts Air National Guard, US

131st Fighter Squadron

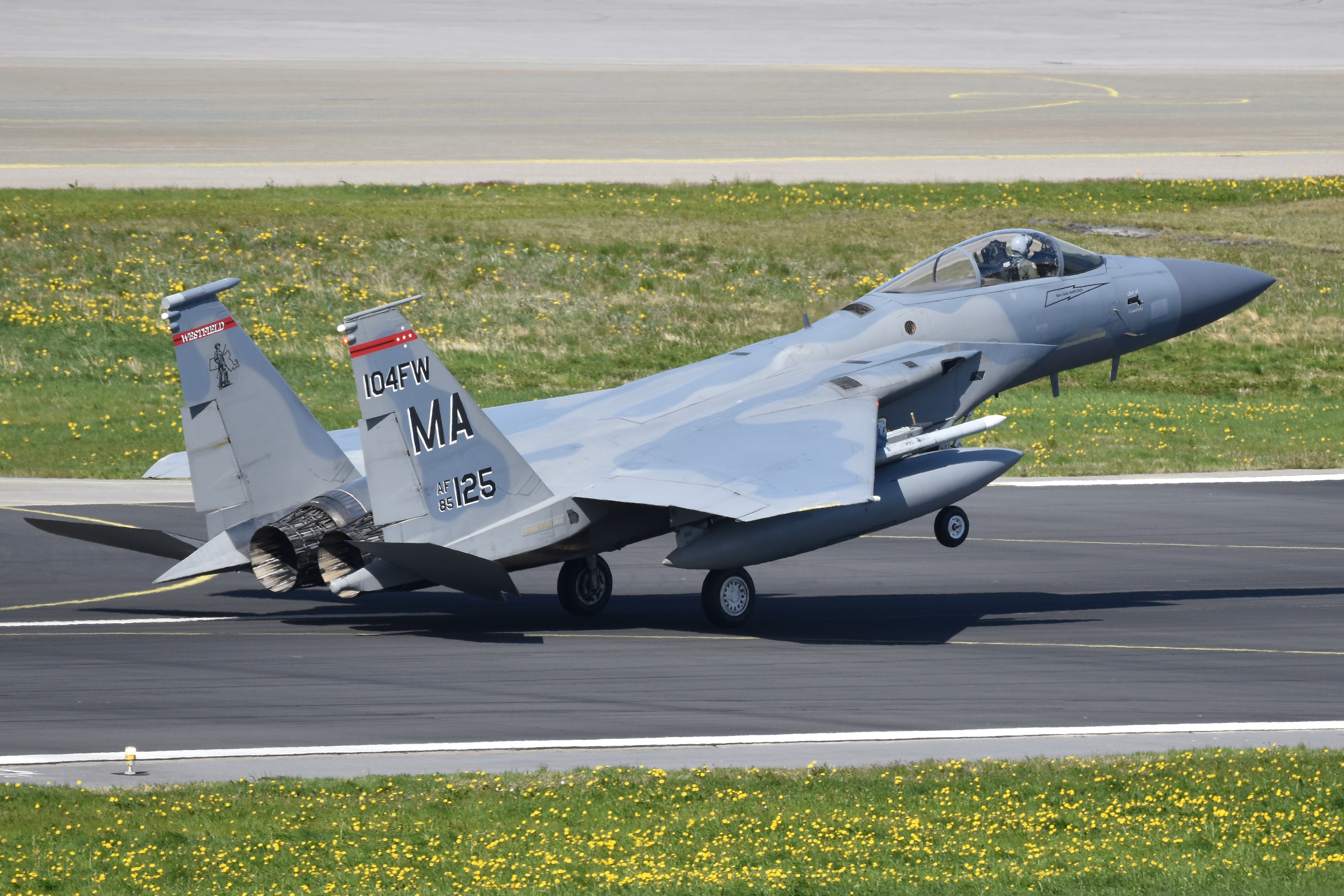
- 131st FS F-15C' landing at Bodø Main Air Station, Norway (Note: Aircraft is McDonnell Douglas F-15C Strike Eagle, serial 85-0125 in 2019.)
- Active: 1942–1946; 1946–present
- Country: United States
- Allegiance: Massachusetts
- Branch: Air National Guard
- Type: Squadron
- Role: Fighter
- Part of: Massachusetts Air National Guard
- Garrison/HQ: Barnes Air National Guard Base, Massachusetts
- Nickname: Barnestormers
- Engagements: Pacific Ocean Theater
- Decorations: Air Force Outstanding Unit Award

Insignia
- 131st Fighter Squadron emblem

- 131st Fighter-Interceptor Squadron emblem

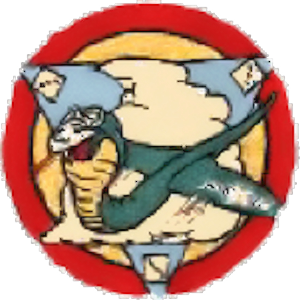
- 333d Fighter Squadron emblem
- Tail code: MA
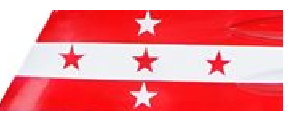
- Tail stripe

The 131st Fighter Squadron, also known as the Barnestormers, is a unit of the Massachusetts Air National Guard 104th Fighter Wing located at Barnes Air National Guard Base, Massachusetts. The squadron is due to convert to the Lockheed Martin F-35A Lightning II in June 2026.

== History ==
=== World War II ===
The squadron was first established in August 1942 at Bellows Field, Hawaii Territory as the 333rd Fighter Squadron. It was initially part of the air defense of Hawaii, equipped with P-39 Airacobras. It also served as a Replacement Training Unit and flew reconnaissance patrols over Hawaii until late 1943.

The 333d deployed to the Central Pacific as part of the Thirteenth Air Force island hopping campaign against Japanese in late 1943. It engaged in combat with the Japanese until April 1944, returning to Hawaii and being re-equipped and trained with long-range P-51 Mustangs. The squadron redeployed to the Western Pacific, and was stationed on Iwo Jima while the battle for the island was still ongoing, and engaged in long-range B-29 Superfortress escort missions over Japan. It continued that mission until the end of hostilities in August 1945. The unit moved to the Mariana Islands, as a Far East Air Forces fighter squadron, and was inactivated there in 1946.

=== Massachusetts Air National Guard ===
The 333d Fighter Squadron was redesignated the 131st Fighter Squadron and was allotted to the Air National Guard on 24 May 1946.It was organized at Barnes Municipal Airport, Massachusetts, and was extended federal recognition on 24 February 1947. The squadron was equipped with P-47D Thunderbolts and was assigned to the Massachusetts National Guard 102d Fighter Group.

In 1950, the Massachusetts ANG converted to the wing-base (Hobson Plan) organization. As a result, the 67th Fighter Wing was withdrawn from the Air National Guard and inactivated on 31 October 1950. In its place, the 102d Fighter Group was assigned to the newly activated 102d Fighter Wing, however there was no change in mission to the 131st, and it remained assigned to the 102d Fighter Group.

==== Air defense mission ====
The mission of the 131st Fighter Squadron was the air defense of Massachusetts. With the surprise invasion of South Korea on 25 June 1950, and the regular military's lack of readiness, most of the Air National Guard was federalized and placed on active duty. The 131st was retained by the Commonwealth of Massachusetts to maintain the air defense mission. In 1951, the F-47s were retired to Davis-Monthan Air Force Base and the 131st was re-equipped with the F-51H Mustang Very Long Range fighter. With its air defense mission, the 131st was redesignated as the 131st Fighter-Interceptor Squadron.

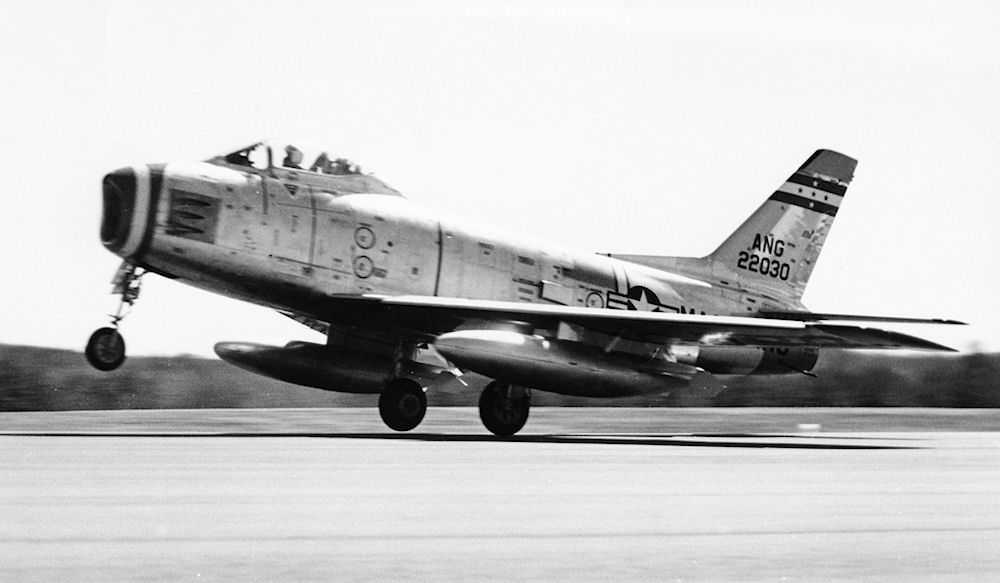
131st Tactical Fighter Squadron F-86H Sabre (Note: Aircraft is North American F-86H-1-NA Sabre, serial 52-2030.)

Beginning on 1 March 1953, the 131st placed two F-51H fighters and five pilots on air defense "runway alert" from one hour before sunrise to one hour after sunset. The runway alert program was the first broad effort to integrate reserve forces into a major Air Force operational mission on a volunteer basis during peacetime. In 1954, the Mustangs were reaching the end of their service lives, and the 131st entered the jet age when it received F-94A Starfire interceptors.

After the Korean War, the Massachusetts Air Guard began to modernize and expand. On 1 May 1956 the 102d wing was redesignated as the 102d Air Defense Wing and the Guard units at Barnes were authorized to expand to a group level. The 104th Fighter Group (Air Defense) was established, with the 131st becoming the group's flying squadron. Other elements assigned into the group were the 104th Material Squadron, 104th Air Base Squadron, and the 104th USAF Infirmary. The 104th, along with the 102d Fighter Group (Air Defense) at Logan Airport, Boston began attending annual training at Otis Air Force Base.

==== Tactical Air Command ====
The squadron's air defense mission ended on 10 November 1958, when the Massachusetts Air Guard and its units were reassigned to Tactical Air Command (TAC) and converted to F-86H Sabre fighter-bombers. During the 1950s and early 1960s, better training and equipment, and closer relations with the Air Force improved the readiness of the Massachusetts Air National Guard.

===== 1961 Berlin federalization =====
During the summer of 1961, as the 1961 Berlin Crisis unfolded, the 131st Tactical Fighter Squadron was notified on 16 August of its pending federalization and call to active duty. On 1 October, the 131st was federalized and assigned to the 102d Tactical Fighter Wing, which was federalized and placed on active duty at Otis Air Force Base.

The mission of the 102d wing was to reinforce the United States Air Forces in Europe (USAFE) and deploy units to Phalsbourg-Bourscheid Air Base, France. In France, the units were to provide close air support and air interdiction to North Atlantic Treaty Organization (NATO) ground forces. This involved keeping its aircraft on 24/7 alert. Between 28 and 30 October, wing elements departed Otis for Phalsbourg. The wing deployed 82 F-86H Sabres. In addition, two C-47 Skytrain and six T-33 Shooting Star aircraft were assigned to the wing for support and training purposes.

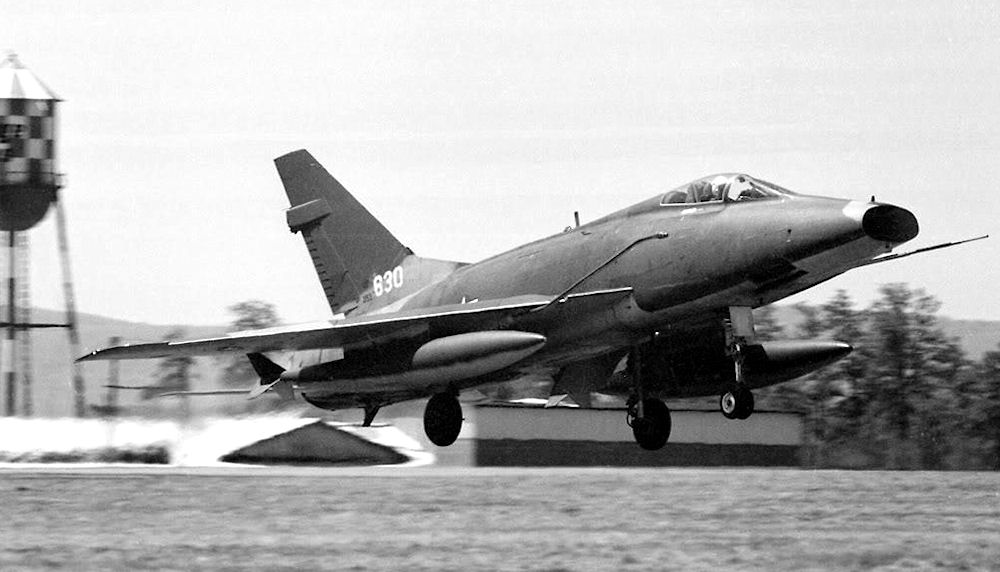
131st TFS F-100D Super Sabre (Note: Aircraft is North American F-100D-45-NH Super Sabre, serial 55-2830.)

Starting on 5 December, the 131st began deploying to Wheelus Air Base, Libya for gunnery training. During its time in Europe, the squadron participated in several USAF and NATO exercises, including a deployment to Leck Air Base, West Germany near the Danish border. At Leck, ground and support crews from both countries exchanged duties, learning how to perform aircraft maintenance and operational support tasks.

On 7 May 1962, Seventeenth Air Force directed that the elements of the 102d wing, deploy back to the United States during the summer, and the unit returned to the United States in July 1962. Regular USAF personnel, along with a group of Air National Guard personnel who volunteered to remain on active duty, formed the 480th Tactical Fighter Squadron of the newly activated 366th Tactical Fighter Wing. The last of the ANG aircraft departed on 20 July.

===== Vietnam era =====
After the Berlin Crisis, the readiness status of the 104th Tactical Fighter Group improved under the "gaining command concept", whereby the regular Air Force Tactical Air Command was responsible for overseeing the training of the group. Operational readiness inspections also honed the edges of the wing.

In 1964, the 131st switched from F-86H Sabres to the F-84F Thunderstreak. Exactly why this equipment change was made cannot be determined. The F-86H was a viable aircraft in the ANG's inventory, with the Sabres from both the 101st and 131st Tactical Fighter Squadrons being sent to the New Jersey ANG, and the 119th and 141st Tactical Fighter Squadrons sending their F-84Fs to the Massachusetts squadrons. The 131st flew the Thunderstreaks throughout the 1960s, and although the squadron was not activated during the Vietnam War, several of its pilots volunteered for combat duty in Southeast Asia. In 1971, the 104th began re-equipping with the F-100D Super Sabre; the Air Guard was always one generation of fighter aircraft behind the Air Force during this time.

===== Close air support =====
The 104th remained as a tactical fighter unit flying the F-100 until July 1979 when the F-100s were retired and the unit was re-equipped with new A-10 Thunderbolt IIs as part of the "Total Force" concept which equipped ANG units with front-line USAF aircraft. This marked the first time the 131st had received new aircraft.

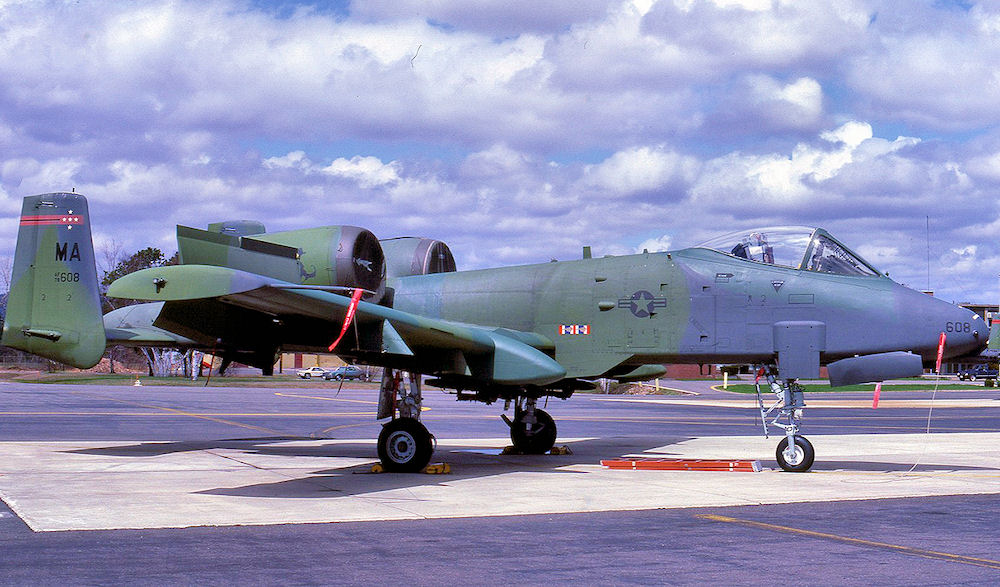
131st TFS A-10A 78-0608, 1989

For most of its existence, the Air Guard had been a reserve force for federal use, only in wartime or national emergency. By the 1980s, the Air Guard was an integral part of daily Air Force operations in what was called "The Total Force Policy" of the United States Department of Defense (DoD). As a result, the Massachusetts Air Guard took on more missions. With the receipt of the A-10, the 131st began a commitment to USAFE, beginning frequent deployments to West Germany, England, Italy, Turkey, and other NATO bases.

In 1990 the 131st was programmed to receive the specialized Block 10 F-16A/B Fighting Falcon, also referred to as the F/A-16 due to its close air support configuration. The 1990 Gulf Crisis, however, delayed this transition. During Operation Desert Storm, the F/A-16 was battle tested, and it was discovered that the close air support F-16 project was a failure. Subsequently, the conversion of the squadron was cancelled in 1993, and the 131st remained an A-10 Thunderbolt II close air support squadron.

==== Air Combat Command ====
===== A-10 Thunderbolt II =====
In March 1992, the unit was redesignated as the 131st Fighter Squadron. In June, Tactical Air Command was inactivated and was replaced by Air Combat Command (ACC). In 1995, the 104th adopted the Air Force Objective Organization plan and the 104th Fighter Group became a Wing, and the 131st was assigned to the new 104th Operations Group.

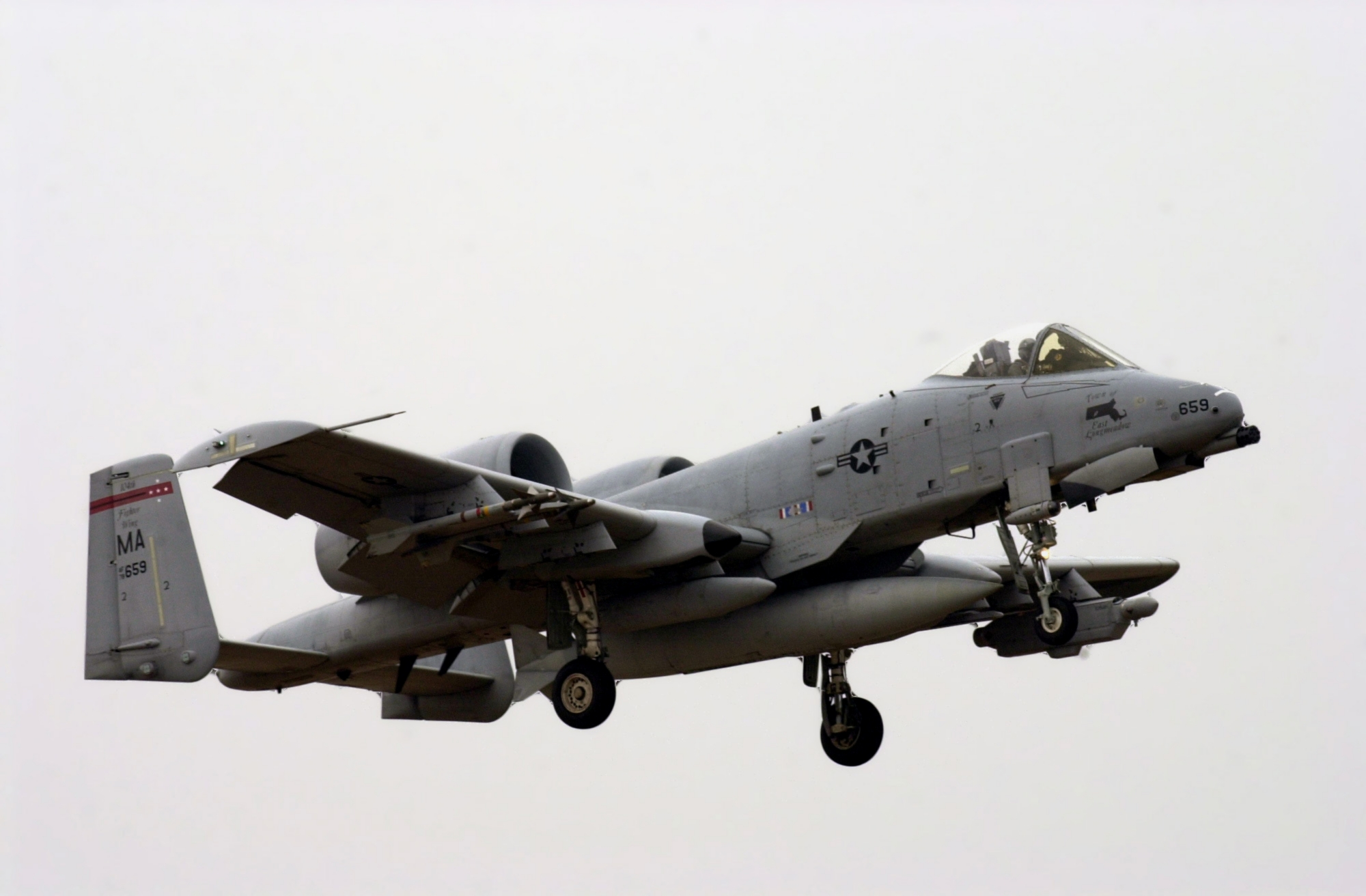
131st FS A-10A, serial 78-0659 on approach to Aviano Air Base, Italy, 2003

From August to October 1995, some 400 airmen of the 104th Fighter Wing deployed to Aviano Air Base, Italy as part of the NATO mission to repel Serbian forces in Bosnia. This was the first time that the 131st Fighter Squadron flew combat sorties since World War II. Four years later, in 1999, elements of the 104th mobilized and flew sorties over the skies of the former Republic of Yugoslavia. As part of an Air Guard A-10 group, the 131st attacked Serb forces in Kosovo.

In mid-1996, the Air Force, in response to budget cuts, and changing world situations, began experimenting with Air Expeditionary organizations. The Air Expeditionary Force concept was developed, a concept that would mix Active-Duty, Reserve and Air National Guard elements into a combined force, instead of entire permanent units deploying as in the 1991 Gulf War, Expeditionary units are composed of "aviation packages" from several wings, including active-duty Air Force, the Air Force Reserve Command and the Air National Guard, would be married together to carry out the assigned deployment rotation.

As a result of the global war on terrorism, in 2003, the 131st Expeditionary Fighter Squadron flew hundreds of combat missions with the A-10 in support of U.S. Army and Marine operations in Afghanistan (Operation Enduring Freedom) and Iraq (Operation Iraqi Freedom). During March and April 2003, as part of Operation Iraqi Freedom, 131st Fighter Squadron A-10s supported the U.S. Army by flying combat missions that interdicted enemy forces.

===== F-15C/D Eagle =====
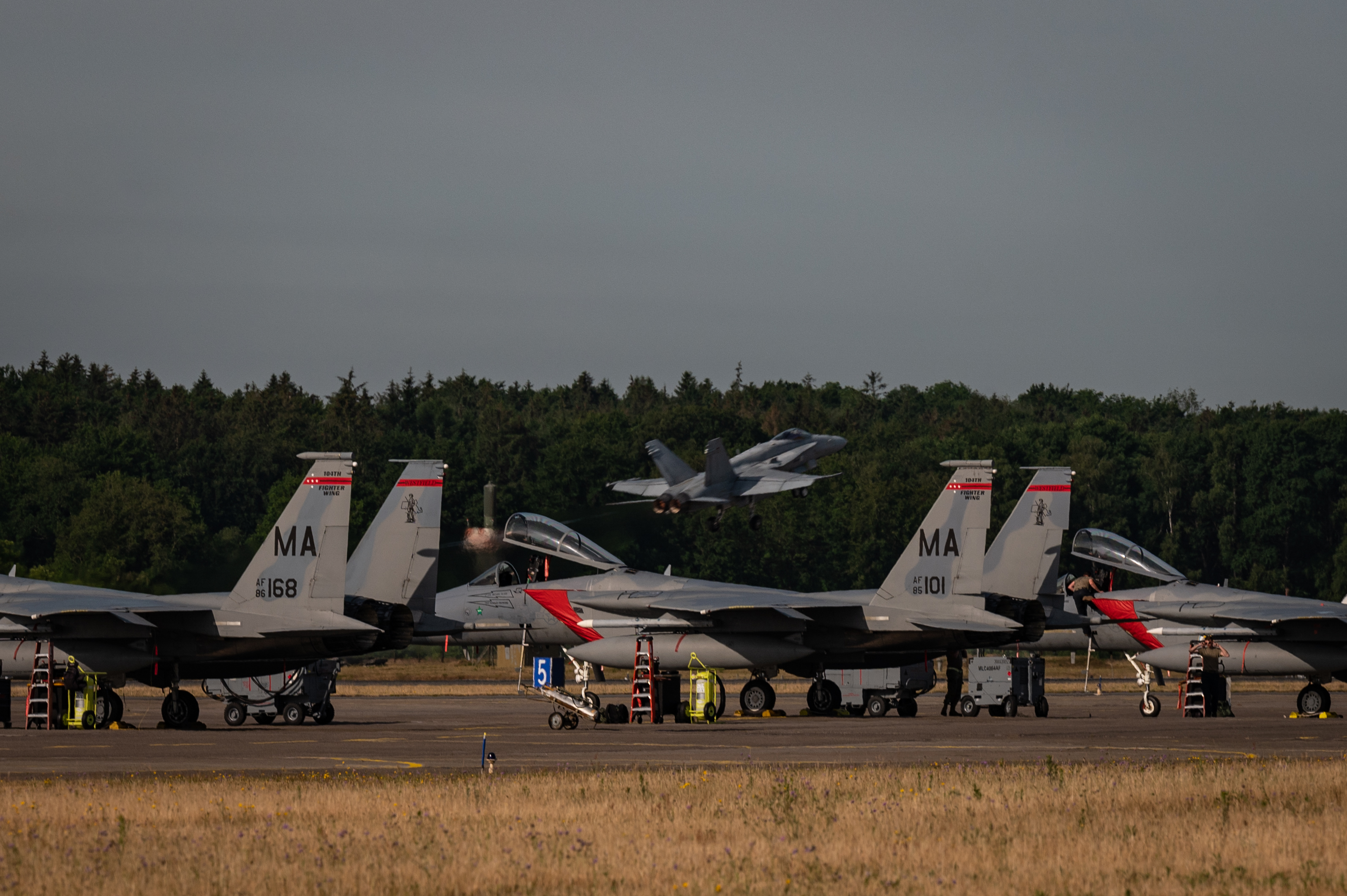
131st EFS F-15Cs on the flight line at Hohn Air Base, Germany, 2023

In its 2005 Base Realignment and Closure recommendations, the Department of Defense recommended that the 131st send its A-10s to the Maryland Air National Guard 104th Fighter Squadron at Warfield Air National Guard Base, Middle River, Maryland. In return, the 131st received the F-15C/D Eagles of the 102d Fighter Wing at Otis, which was to convert into a non-flying intelligence wing. The realignment marked the end for the 131st's nearly 30-year mission of flying close-air support missions with the A-10. The 131st took over the homeland security mission of the 102d. In 2007, the A-10s began flying to Maryland and the F-15s began arriving from Otis. By the end of 2007, 18 F-15Cs and one trainer F-15D had arrived at Barnes.

In addition to the air defense mission, the men and women of the 131st Fighter Squadron deployed on air expeditionary missions to the Middle East in support of combat operations as part of Operation Enduring Freedom. The last such deployment was completed in July 2012.

Between September 2021 and April 2022, the 131st FS received newer FY84 and FY86 F-15Cs from the 493rd Fighter Squadron at RAF Lakenheath, United Kingdom, due to the 493rd FS divesting their jets in preparation to convert to the Lockheed Martin F-35A Lightning II. The 131st FS also received F-15Cs from Kadena Air Base's 18th Wing.

In April 2023, it was announced that the 131st FS would be receiving 18 Lockheed Martin F-35A Lightning IIs to replace their aging F-15C/D Eagles. The Barnestormers are scheduled to divest their last F-15C Eagle in December 2025.

The 131st FS participated in Exercise Air Defender 23. Organized by the Bundeswehr, the Barnestormers deployed eight F-15Cs to Hohn Air Base, Germany, between 12 and 23 June 2023 to take part in the largest ever air deployment exercise in NATO history.

In October 2025, the final F-15s from the 131st FS departed Barnes to their final resting place at Davis-Monthan Air Force Base.

===== F-35A Lightning II =====
In April 2024, the 131st chose its initial cadre of 21 airmen to undertake a two-year course to train on the F-35A Lightning II in preparation for delivery of the first jets in June 2026.

== Lineage ==
- Constituted as the 333d Fighter Squadron (Single Engine) on 18 August 1942

Activated on 23 August 1942
Inactivated on 12 January 1946

- Redesignated 131st Fighter Squadron, Single Engine and allotted to the National Guard on 24 May 1946

Activated on 18 December 1946
Extended federal recognition on 24 February 1947
Redesignated 131st Fighter-Interceptor Squadron on 16 August 1952
Redesignated 131st Tactical Fighter Squadron (Day) on 10 November 1958
Federalized and placed on active duty on 1 October 1961
Released from active duty and returned to Massachusetts control on 31 August 1962
Redesignated 131st Tactical Fighter Squadron c. 15 October 1962
Redesignated 131st Fighter Squadron on 1 June 1992
Deployed as the 131st Expeditionary Fighter Squadron to Trapani Birgi Air Base, Italy from 17 May 1999 to 7 June 1999 and to Aviano Air Base, Italy from January 2003 to October 2003.

=== Assignments ===
- 18th Fighter Group, 23 August 1942
- 318th Fighter Group, 11 January 1943 – 12 January 1946
- 102d Fighter Group (later 102d Fighter-Interceptor Group), 24 February 1947
- 104th Fighter Group (Air Defense) (later 104th Tactical Fighter Group), 1 May 1956
- 102d Tactical Fighter Wing, 1 October 1961
- 104th Tactical Fighter Group (later 104th Fighter Group), 20 August 1962
- 104th Operations Group, October 1995–present

=== Stations ===
- Bellows Field, Hawaii Territory, 23 August 1942
- Canton Army Air Field, Phoenix Islands, 11 September 1942
- General Lyman Field, Hawaii Territory, 6 April 1943
- Bellows Field, Hawaii Territory, 28 July 1943
- East Field (Saipan), Mariana Islands, 6 July 1944
- Ie Shima Airfield, Ryukyu Islands, 30 April 1945
- Naha Airfield, Okinawa, November 1945 – December 1945
- Fort Lewis, Washington, 11–12 January 1946
- Barnes Municipal Airport, Massachusetts, 14 May 1946
- Phalsbourg Air Base, France, 1 October 1961
- Barnes Municipal Airport (later Barnes Air National Guard Base), Massachusetts, 20 August 1962 – Present

==== Massachusetts Air National Guard deployments ====
- 1961 Berlin Crisis federalization
- Operation Restore Hope

Yenişehir Airport, Turkey, 1982

- Operations Deny Flight and Deliberate Force

Aviano Air Base, Italy, 1995

- Operation Southern Watch (AEF)

Al Jaber Air Base, Kuwait, 2000

- Operation Iraqi Freedom (AEF)

Balad Air Base, Iraq, 2003

- Operation Enduring Freedom (AEF)

Undisclosed Location, Southwest Asia, 2012

=== Aircraft ===
- Bell P-39 Airacobra (1942–1944)
- Republic P-47 Thunderbolt (1944–1945)
- Lockheed P-38 Lightning (1944–1945)
- Republic F-47D Thunderbolt (1947–1951)
- North American F-51D Mustang (1951–1954)
- Lockheed F-94A Starfire (1954–1957)
- North American F-86H Sabre (1957–1965)
- Republic F-84F Thunderstreak (1965–1971)
- North American F-100D Super Sabre (1971–1979)
- Fairchild Republic A-10A Thunderbolt II (1979–2007)
- McDonnell Douglas F-15C/D Eagle (2007–2025)
- Lockheed Martin F-35A Lightning II (planned for 2026)
