= Air Transport Wing 63 =

Coordinates: 54.3119°N 9.5381°E

- Lufttransportgeschwader 63 (LTG 63)
- Active: 24 August 1957 - 15 December 2021
- Disbanded: 15 December 2021
- Country: Germany
- Branch: German Air Force
- Type: Wing
- Role: Strategic and tactical transport
- Part of: Air Force Combat Command; Kommando Einsatzverbände der Luftwaffe
- Garrison/HQ: Hohn Air Base
- Decorations: Campaign streamer Schleswig-Holstein (1981); Campaign streamer Federal Republic of Germany (1997)

Aircraft flown
- Transport: Transall C-160

Air Transport Wing 63 (German: Lufttransportgeschwader 63) was a wing of the German Air Force (Luftwaffe). The wing was created in 1957 and was last based at Hohn Air Base in Schleswig-Holstein, Germany, operating the last German Transall C-160 fixed-wing aircraft.

In December 2021, the wing was disbanded with the phaseout of its Transall aircraft in favour of the Airbus A400M, which are all stationed in Wunstorf. A contingent of 60 will maintain Hohn Air Base as a reserve airfield for Tactical Wing 51 from Jagel.

== Commanding officers ==
- Oberstleutnant Wilhelm Batz, 15 December 1961 – 31 January 1964
- Oberst Horst Rudat, 1 February 1964 – 31 March 1971
- Oberst Dr. Heinz-Ulrich Beuther, 1 April 1971 – 31 March 1979
- Oberst Hubert Marquitan, 1 April 1979 – 30 September 1980
- Oberst Rudi Gutzeit, 1 October 1980 – 30 September 1986
- Oberst Jürgen Reiss, 1 October 1986 – 31 March 1991
- Oberst Joachim Mörsdorf, 1 April 1991 – 30 September 1993
- Oberst Hans-Otto Elger, 1 October 1993 – 31 March 1995
- Oberst Hans-Jürgen Ochs, 1 April 1995 – 30 September 1998
- Oberst Hans-Jürgen Miunske, 1 October 1998 – 27 March 2003
- Oberst Helmut Fritzsche, 28 March 2003 – 27 March 2006
- Oberst Manfred Merten, 27 March 2006 – 25 February 2010
- Oberst Stefan W. Neumann, 25 February 2010 – 18 June 2012
- Oberst Hartmut Zitzewitz, 19 June 2012 – 22 October 2018
- Oberst Markus Kleinbauer, 22 October 2018 - 15 December 2021
