= Walter Wolfrum =

WWII German Fighter Pilot Ace (1923–2010)

- Wolfrum as an Oberleutnant
- Born: 23 May 1923; Schmölz, Küps
- Died: 26 August 2010 (aged 87); Schwabach, Germany
- Military career
- Allegiance: Nazi Germany
- Branch: Luftwaffe
- Service years: 1940–1945
- Rank: Oberleutnant (first lieutenant)
- Unit: JG 52
- Commands: 1./JG 52
- Conflicts: See battles World War II: Eastern Front; Battle of the Caucasus
- Awards: Knight's Cross of the Iron Cross
- Other work: Gold leaf business Aerobatics pilot & coach

Walter Wolfrum (23 May 1923 – 26 August 2010) was a German military aviator who served in the Luftwaffe during World War II. As a fighter ace, he flew 424 combat missions and claimed 137 aerial victories—that is, 137 aerial combat encounters resulting in the destruction of the enemy aircraft. This ties him for 43rd place among highest scoring fighter aces. He was also a recipient of the Knight's Cross of the Iron Cross, the highest award in the military and paramilitary forces of Nazi Germany during World War II.

Following World War II, Wolfrum worked in the gold leaf business and continued flying as aerobatics pilot. He died on 26 August 2010 in Schwabach, Germany.

== Early life and career ==
Wolfrum was born on 23 May 1923 in Schmölz, today part of Küps in Upper Franconia, then in Bavaria of the Weimar Republic. He was the second of four children of the protestant pastor Ludwig Wolfrum. Wolfrum had a three years older sister, Annemarie, and two younger brothers, Herbert and Helmut, born in 1926 and 1930. In 1929, Wolfrum's father was transferred and the family moved to Georgensgmünd. Here, his father joined the Nazi Party in 1932.

On 15 October 1940, Wolfrum began his military training with Fliegerausbildungs-Regiment 10 (10th Flight Training Regiment) in Neukuhren, now Pionersky in Russia, then in East Prussia. On 1 March 1941, he was posted to the Luftkriegsschule 2 (LKS 2—2nd air war school) at Berlin-Gatow holding the rank of Fahnenjunker (officer cadet).

On 18 December, Wolfrum was transferred to Ergänzungs-Jagdgruppe Ost (EJGr Ost—Supplementary Fighter Group, East) which was based at Saint-Jean-d'Angély in France. EJGr Ost main purpose was to provide specialized training for new fighter pilots destined for the Eastern Front. Training was provided by experienced Eastern Front veterans, who were rotated in and out of this unit. Wolfrum was assigned to group of six trainee pilots which included Wilhelm Batz and Franz Schall. Their fighter pilot instructor was Oberfeldwebel Karl Steffen, a combat veteran credited with 44 aerial victories. On 25 January 1943, Wolfrum was ordered to report to Jagdgeschwader 52 (JG 52—52nd Fighter Wing) which was fighting on the southern sector of Eastern Front.

== World War II ==
World War II in Europe had begun on Friday, 1 September 1939 when German forces invaded Poland. In June 1941, German forces had launched Operation Barbarossa, the invasion of the Soviet Union. Following a short vacation with his family, Wolfrum travelled by train to Krakau, now Kraków in Poland. At Kraukau, he was given a factory new Messerschmitt Bf 109 G-2 to be shuttled to the front. A stopover for refueling at Reichshof, now Rzeszów, resulted in a crash landing in snowy conditions and forced layover of ten days for repairs of the aircraft. On 10 February, Wolfrum reported to the Geschwaderkommodore (wing commander) of JG 52, Oberstleutnant Dietrich Hrabak, at Mariupol on the Sea of Azov. Hrabak assigned Wolfrum to II. Gruppe (2nd group) of JG 52 under command of Hauptmann Johannes Steinhoff which had sustained heavy losses in the Battle of Stalingrad. At the time, the Gruppe was based at an airfield at Slavyansk-na-Kubani in the combat area of the Kuban bridgehead. There, Steinhoff assigned Wolfrum to 5. Staffel (5th squadron) which was then temporarily headed by Oberfeldwebel Willi Nemitz before cammand officially passed to Leutnant Helmut Haberda in late February.

II./JG 52 insignia

On 13 March 1943, II. Gruppe of JG 52 moved to an airfield at Anapa located on the northern coast of the Black Sea near the Sea of Azov and was fighting in the Battle of the Caucasus until 5 July. Here on 26 May, Oberleutnant Wilhelm Batz was placed in command of 5. Staffel. Batz succeeded Leutnant Josef Zwernemann who temporarily led the Staffel after its former commander, Leutnant Helmut Haberda, had been killed in action on 8 May. Two days later flying his 62 combat mission, Wolfrum claimed his first aerial victory when he shot down a Yakovlev Yak-1 fighter aircraft. On 28 July, he was awarded the Iron Cross 2nd Class (Eisernes Kreuz zweiter Klasse) and received the Iron Cross 1st Class (Eisernes Kreuz erster Klasse) on 22 September. In mid-December, Wolfrum was sent on home-leave stayed with his family over Christmas. In early 1944, he headed for the fighter pilot recreation facility at Bad Wiessee and returned to his unit in early February.

On 14 April 1944, II. Gruppe moved to Chersonesus at Sevastopol. The following day, Wolfrum claimed his 70th and last aerial victory while flying with II. Gruppe, an Ilyushin Il-2 ground-attack aircraft. At the time, he was the seventh most successful fighter pilot of the Gruppe. For these achievements, Wolfrum was presented the Honor Goblet of the Luftwaffe (Ehrenpokal der Luftwaffe). Following this engagement with ten Il-2 ground-attack aircraft, he made a forced landing in his Bf 109 G-6 (Werknummer 411777—factory number) 5 kilometers (3.1 miles) southwest of Sevastopol. His aircraft was destroyed in a fire and Wolfrum sustained minor injuries. Hit by the tail gunner of an Il-2, Wolfrum's aircraft started burning and his canopy failed to release, preventing him from bailing out. Wolfrum, who suffered burns to his face and hands, was sent to a hospital at Mamaia.

=== Squadron leader ===
On 10 May 1944 following his recovery, Wolfrum was transferred and appointed Staffelkapitän (squadron leader) of 1. Staffel of JG 52, succeeding Oberleutnant Karl-Heinz Plücker who was killed in action. At the time, the Staffel was based at Leipzig, present-day Serpneve, and subordinated to I. Gruppe headed by Hauptmann Johannes Wiese. Wolfrum was then awarded the German Cross in Gold (Deutsches Kreuz in Gold) for his achievements while flying with II. Gruppe.

I./JG 52 insignia

On 20 May, Wolfrum claimed six aerial victories, an "ace-in-a-day" achievement. He became a double "ace-in-a-day" following eleven aerial victories on 30 May 1944. The next day, he again claimed six aircraft shot down, again making him an "ace-in-a-day". On 30 May, 1. Staffel moved to an airfield at Iași where they stayed until 6 June. Here on 1 June, Wolfrum claimed four aerial victories, all Yakovlev Yak-9 fighter aircraft, including his 100th in total. He was the 74th Luftwaffe pilot to achieve the century mark.

The Staffel returned to Leipzig on 6 June. Five days later, I. Gruppe received a new commander, Hauptmann Adolf Borchers who replaced Wiese after he had been wounded in combat. On 22 June, Soviet forces launched Operation Bagration, attacking Army Group Centre in Byelorussia, with the objective of encircling and destroying its main component armies. On 26 June, 1. Staffel moved to Poloniczna, a makeshift airfield located approximately 50 kilometers (31 miles) northeast of Lemberg, now Lviv. Here on 7 July, Wolfrum claimed four Yak-9 fighters shot down. He then claimed three aerial victories on 14 July. The next Wolfrum, claimed a single Il-2 ground-attack aircraft, a single Yak-9 fighter and two Bell P-39 Airacobra fighters, taking his total to 116 aerial victories.

=== Wounded in combat and end of war ===
On 16 July during the Lvov-Sandomierz Offensive, Wolfrum again became a double "ace-in-a-day" when he claimed ten aircraft shot down in combat near Kamionka, northeast of Lemberg. Following these ten victories, he was severely wounded requiring a lengthy period of convalescence. In consequence, Oberleutnant Manfred Eberwein was given command of 1. Staffel.

Wulfrum had claimed two Yak-9 fighters on his first combat mission of the day. These two claims were misidentified Yak-1 fighters of 611 IAP (Istrebitelny Aviatsionny Polk—Истребительный Авиационный Полк or Fighter Aviation Regiment) which lost two aircraft in this encounter. He again claimed two Yak-9s on the second mission. On his third mission, he claimed four further aierial victories, all Lavochkin La-5 fighters. Flying his fourth mission of the day, the Staffel engaged a formation of Petlyakov Pe-2 and North American B-25 Mitchell bombers, escorted by Yak-9 and La-5 fighters. During this encounter, Wolfrum claimed a Yak-9 fighter shot down but lost his wingman who had aborted the mission due to combat damage sustained. Wulfrum then detected a formation of high flying P-39 fighters which he engaged. In this engagement, he claimed one of the P-39s shot down before he was hit, taking a bullet wound to the right hip, probably hit by a P-39 from 9 IAP. Wolfrum managed to disengage and return to the Poloniczna airfield. After he landed his Bf 109 G-6 (Werknummer 163631), he lost consciousness. He was recovered from the cockpit and flown in a Junkers Ju 52 transport aircraft to a hospital at Lemberg. He received immediate surgery which revealed that a .50 caliber projectile had penetrated his abdomen and pelvis. He was then transported back to Germany where he was awarded the Knight's Cross of the Iron Cross (Ritterkreuz des Eisernen Kreuzes) while still hospitalized on 27 July. At the time of his injury sustained, Wolfrum was credited with 126 aerial victories and the leading fighter pilot of I. Gruppe. To date, Wolfrum had flown 406 combat missions.

On 31 August 1944, Oberst Hrabak, Geschwaderkommodore of JG 52, submitted a report, requesting a preferential promotion for Wolfrum to Oberleutnant (first lieutenant). The application was seconded by General Hans Seidemann, commander-in-chief of the VIII. Fliegerkorps, on 8 September. The request was approved and the promotion backdated to 1 September. Following his convalescence on 4 February 1945, Wolfrum retook command of 1. Staffel of JG 52. Consequently, Eberwein was transferred. At the time, I. Gruppe was based at Weidengut, present-day Wierzbie in Poland, and under command of Hauptmann Erich Hartmann.

The Gruppe moved to Breslau-Schöngarten, now Wrocław Airport, on 7 February. Here two days later, Wolfrum's Bf 109 G-10 was hit by a Yak-9 fighter while fighting over Oder bridgehead near Steinau, now Ścinawa. This encounter ended in a belly landing at the Breslau-Schöngarten airfield. That night, the Gruppe was forced to retreat and returned to Weidengut. Here on 10 February, Wolfrum claimed his first aerial victory following his convalescence when he shot down a Yak-9 fighter but was again shot down. He crash landed his Bf 109 G-10 (Werknummer 491415) southwest of Steinau. On 5 April, I. Gruppe moved to an makeshift airfield at Raudnitz, present-day Roudnice nad Labem. Here on 17 April, Wolfrum claimed his last two aerial victories, both claims were over Yak-9 fighters, taking his total to 137. On 19 April, the Gruppe moved to an airfield located approximately 4 kilometers (2.5 miles) southwest of Deutsch-Brod, now Havlíčkův Brod. At the end of the war, Wolfrum surrendered to the US 90th Infantry Division.

== Later life ==
Following the end of World War II, according to Wolfrum's own account, he and Hans-Ulrich Rudel were in contact in the first years. The two had briefly met twice during the war. Wolfrum's girlfriend Irene Rühl had a friend who worked for the Americans as a secretary at a hospital in Fürth where Rudel was being treated. With the help of this friend, Rudel's release papers were signed and he was set free. Wolfrum states that he then periodically aided Rudel as a motorcycle driver and courier. Additionally, Wolfrum's father helped Rudel's father, Johannes Rudel, find a new home and position as a pastor in Gunzenhausen. At the time, Rudel was getting in contact with his former comrades from Schlachtgeschwader 2. With the aid of these comrades, Rudel had set up a smuggling ring across the various zones of Allied-occupied Germany. The official currency in Germany at the time was still the Reichsmark and its exchange rate varied from zone to zone. Rudel and his men built an illegal business, disguised as a haulage company, around this discrepancy in exchange rates by smuggling large sums of money from one zone to another, buying and selling currency with a profitable margin. Wolfrum states that his contact with Rudel ended in 1948 after Rudel had left for Argentina.

In late 1945, Wolfrum married Irene Rühl, nicknamed "Quex" for her lively character by her friends. The two had shared a long friendship and had first met at a dancing school in 1939 aged 16. The marriage produced four daughters. On 1 February 1946, Wolfrum, who had briefly considered attending university, was hired by his father-in-law August Rühl, founder and owner of the August Rühl GmbH, a manufacturer of gold leaf in Schwabach. On 16 May 1988, his wife Irene died of cancer. Two years later, Wolfrum married Monika Patzig.

Wolfrum then became a successful aerobatics pilot, winning the German Championship in 1962 and taking second place in 1961, 1963, 1964 and 1966. He died on 26 August 2010 at the age of 87 in Schwabach, Germany.

== Summary of career ==
=== Aerial victory claims ===
According to US historian David T. Zabecki, Wolfrum was credited with 137 aerial victories. Spick also lists him with 137 aerial victories claimed in 423 combat missions and a mission-to-claim ratio of 3.09. Obermaier lists him with 424 combat missions flown. Mathews and Foreman, authors of Luftwaffe Aces — Biographies and Victory Claims, researched the German Federal Archives and state that Wolfrum was credited with 134 aerial victories, plus sixteen further unconfirmed claims. All of his victories were claimed on the Eastern Front.

=== Awards ===
- Iron Cross (1939)
  - 2nd Class (28 July 1943)
  - 1st Class (22 September 1943)
- Honor Goblet of the Luftwaffe on 24 April 1944 as Leutnant and pilot (Note: According to Obermaier on 20 April 1944. Barbas states on 20 March 1944.)
- German Cross in Gold on 18 May 1944 as Leutnant in the 5./Jagdgeschwader 52
- Knight's Cross of the Iron Cross on 27 July 1944 as Leutnant and pilot in the 5./Jagdgeschwader 52 (Note: According to Scherzer as pilot in the I./Jagdgeschwader 52.)
