= Wilhelm Batz =

German World War II fighter pilot (1916–1988)

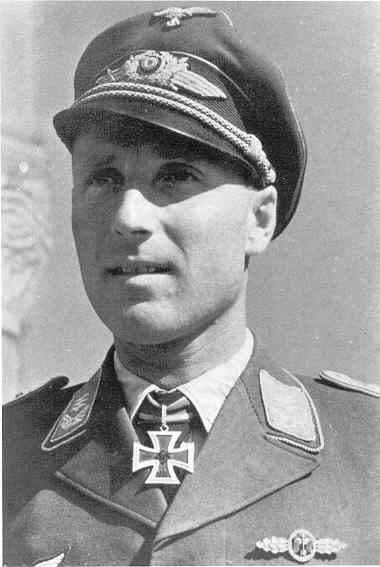
- Batz as a Hauptmann
- Born: 21 May 1916; Bamberg, German Empire
- Died: 11 September 1988 (aged 72); Ebern, Unterfranken, West Germany
- Burial place: Leverkusen-Opladen
- Military career
- Allegiance: Nazi Germany; West Germany
- Branch: Luftwaffe (Wehrmacht); German Air Force (Bundeswehr)
- Service years: 1935–1945; 1956–1972
- Rank: Major (Wehrmacht); Oberstleutnant (Bundeswehr)
- Unit: Flugzeugführerschule "S"
- Commands: III./JG 52, II./JG 52; LTG 63
- Conflicts: See battles World War II: Eastern Front Defense of the Reich
- Awards: Knight's Cross of the Iron Cross with Oak Leaves and Swords

Wilhelm Batz (21 May 1916 – 11 September 1988) was a German Luftwaffe fighter ace during World War II. A flying ace or fighter ace is a military aviator credited with shooting down five or more aircraft during aerial combat. Batz flew 445 combat missions and claimed 237 aircraft shot down; 234 victories were achieved over the Eastern Front, including at least 46 Ilyushin Il-2 ground-attack aircraft. Batz claimed three victories, including one four-engine bomber against the United States Army Air Forces (USAAF) over the Ploieşti oil fields. Following the war, he served in the German Air Force of the Federal Republic of Germany (West Germany).

Born in Bamberg, Batz joined the Luftwaffe in 1935 and completed his flight training in 1939. Batz then served as a flight instructor before he was trained as fighter pilot. In February 1943, Batz was transferred to II. Gruppe (2nd Group) of Jagdgeschwader 52 (JG 52—52nd Fighter Wing) which was on the Eastern Front. Batz claimed his first aerial victory on 11 March 1943. Following the claiming of 100 aerial victories, he was awarded the Knight's Cross of the Iron Cross on 26 March 1944. He was given command of III. Gruppe of JG 52 in April 1944 and command of II. Gruppe of JG 52 in February 1945. Batz was awarded the Knight's Cross of the Iron Cross with Oak Leaves and Swords in April 1945. After the war, Batz joined the Air Force of the Bundeswehr, commanding Lufttransportgeschwader 63 (LTG 63–Air Transport Wing 63). He retired in 1972 and died on 11 September 1988 in Ebern in Unterfranken.

== Early life and career ==
Batz was born on 21 May 1916 in Bamberg, in the Kingdom of Bavaria. He was the son of a Beamter, a civil servant. Batz grew up between the world wars, with the Red Baron as his ideal of a fighter pilot. After Batz graduated with his Abitur (university-preparatory high school diploma), he volunteered for four years military service in the Luftwaffe on 1 November 1935. After he completed his basic training at Neubiberg, he was posted to the flight school at Kaufbeuren Airfield on 1 February 1936. Following flight training, he became a flight instructor with Fliegerausbildungs-Regiment 23 (23rd Aviators Training Regiment). (Note: Flight training in the Luftwaffe progressed through the levels A1, A2 and B1, B2, referred to as A/B flight training. A training included theoretical and practical training in aerobatics, navigation, long-distance flights and dead-stick landings. The B courses included high-altitude flights, instrument flights, night landings and training to handle the aircraft in difficult situations.) In November 1939, Batz was posted to at Jüterbog-Damm Airfield in Jüterbog and later to Reinsdorf Airfield.

In June 1940, Batz returned to Fliegerausbildungs-Regiment 23 in Kaufbeuren. He then attended an officers training course at the Luftkriegsschule 2 in Berlin–Gatow. On 1 November 1940, Batz was promoted to Leutnant (second lieutenant). He continued to serve as a flight instructor, logging more than 5,000 flying hours, until 31 October 1942. On 1 November, Batz was posted to the Jagdfliegerschule (fighter pilot school) in Bad Aibling. On 20 December, Batz moved on to 2. Staffel (2nd squadron) of Ergänzungs-Jagdgruppe Ost (EJGr Ost—Supplementary Fighter Group, East) which was based at Saint-Jean-d'Angély in France. EJGr Ost main purpose was to provide specialized training for new fighter pilots destined for the Eastern Front. Training was provided by experienced Eastern Front veterans, who were rotated in and out of this unit. Batz was assigned to group of six trainee pilots which included Franz Schall and Walter Wolfrum. Their fighter pilot instructor was Oberfeldwebel Karl Steffen, a combat veteran credited with 44 aerial victories.

== World War II ==
World War II in Europe had begun on Friday 1 September 1939 when German forces invaded Poland. On 1 February 1943, Batz was transferred to II. Gruppe (2nd group) of Jagdgeschwader 52 (JG 52—52nd Fighter Wing). The Gruppe was based at an airfield at Rostov-on-Don on the Eastern Front and under command of Hauptmann Johannes Steinhoff. The Gruppe was moved to the combat area of the Kuban bridgehead on 10 February where it was initially based at an airfield at Slavyansk-na-Kubani. Due to weather, II. Gruppe moved to Kerch on 16 February. Here flying with the Gruppenstab (headquarters unit), Batz claimed his first aerial victory on 11 March when he shot down a Lavochkin-Gorbunov-Gudkov LaGG-3 fighter. Two days later, the Gruppe moved to an airfield at Anapa. During the relocation flight, he was credited with the destruction of a Douglas A-20 Havoc bomber, also known as "Boston". On 1 April, Batz was promoted to Oberleutnant (first lieutenant).

Flying from Anapa, Batz claimed two LaGG-3 fighters shot down on 15 April, the second near Abinskaya. On 20 April, he claimed four aerial victories. He was credited with the destruction of an Ilyushin Il-2 ground-attack aircraft. A LaGG-3 fighter claimed near Gelendzhik remained unconfirmed while a further claim over another LaGG-3 fighter shot down near Kabardinka, located approximately 15 km (9.3 mi) northwest of Gelendzhik and an Il-2 ground-attack aircraft destroyed west of Gelendzhik were approved. On 24 April, he was awarded the Iron Cross 2nd Class (Eisernes Kreuz zweiter Klasse) for seven aerial victories. On 9 May, Batz was credited with shooting down a Yakovlev Yak-1 fighter.

=== Squadron leader ===
On 26 May 1943, Batz was appointed Staffelkapitän (squadron leader) of 5. Staffel of JG 52. He succeeded Leutnant Josef Zwernemann who temporarily led the Staffel after its former commander, Leutnant Helmut Haberda had been killed in action on 8 May. On 3 July, Batz was awarded the Iron Cross 1st Class (Eisernes Kreuz erster Klasse). By end of October, Batz was credited with 36 aerial victories, making him the fifth leading active fighter pilot of II. Gruppe. The Gruppe had moved to Kherson on 30 October and then transferred to Baherove on the Crimean peninsula on 2 November where it was based until 19 March 1944. By end of November, Batz had increased his number of aerial victories to 50. In December, he claimed 25 further aerial victories, raising his total to 75 on 7 December. This included three "ace-in-a-day" achievements on 1, 2 and 5 December. On 7 December, Batz attacked small vessels off the coast of Eltigen (Heroyevskoe), part of Kerch. During the strafing attack, his Bf 109 was hit by anti-aircraft fire resulting in a forced landing. Batz sustained injuries to his shoulder and was sent on home leave. His home leave and convalescence ended in February 1944. On 28 January 1944, Batz received the German Cross in Gold (Deutsches Kreuz in Gold).

Batz claimed his first three aerial victories of 1944 on 10 February when he shot down a Yak-1 and two Yakovlev Yak-9 fighters. At the end of February, his number of aerial victories had increased to 88, putting him in second place in II. Gruppe tied with Leutnant Heinrich Sturm and Leutnant Helmut Lipfert. On 19 March, the Gruppe was ordered to Grammatikowo located near Sovietskyi. Here on 22 March, Batz claimed his 100th aerial victory when he shot down a Yak-9 and Bell P-39 Airacobra fighter. He was the 67th Luftwaffe pilot to achieve a hundred victories. Batz was awarded the Knight's Cross of the Iron Cross (Ritterkreuz des Eisernen Kreuzes) on 26 March. With 101 aerial victories to his credit, he was the third most successful fighter pilot in II. Gruppe. Barkhorn with 251 aerial victories was in the lead and Leutnant Otto Fönnekold was second with 116 claims.

=== Group commander and surrender ===
III./JG 52 emblem

Batz was promoted to Hauptmann (captain) on 1 April 1944. The narrow land bridge to the Crimean peninsula, held by the German 17th Army, came under attack from Soviet forces on 7 April, leading to the capture of Odessa on 10 April during the Dnieper–Carpathian Offensive. In these battles, Batz claimed six aerial victories on 8 April, five on 10 April, reaching his 120th victory on 13 April. One day later, II. Gruppe moved to an airfield at Cape Chersonesus located at the Sevastopol Bay. That morning, the airfield came under aerial attack and Batz was wounded by bomb splinters. Although his injuries were minor, he was grounded for two weeks and banned by the doctor from flying operationally. During his convalescence, Batz succeeded Günther Rall as Gruppenkommandeur (group commander) of III. Gruppe (3rd group) of JG 52 on 19 April 1944. By end April, his number of aerial victories had reached 121 claimed.

At the time of his appointment, Batz was serving with the Gruppenstab of I. Gruppe of JG 52, receiving command instructions. III. Gruppe was also based at Cape Chersonesus located at the Sevastopol Bay, while I. Gruppe at the time was based at Leipzig, present-day Serpneve. Here on 2 May, Batz became an "ace-in-a-day" again when he claimed three P-39s, a Yak-1 and an Il-2 shot down. On 18 May, III. Gruppe also arrived at Leipzig where Batz took command of the Gruppe. On 31 May, Batz became a triple "ace-in-a-day" when during the course of seven combat missions he claimed fifteen aerial victories which included six Il-2s, five P-39s and four Lavochkin La-5 fighters. This raised his total to 155 aerial victories claimed.

On 1 June, III. Gruppe relocated to Roman in Romania. His unit defended Romanian targets against the United States Army Air Forces (USAAF) Fifteenth Air Force. Batz claimed two North American P-51 Mustang fighter aircraft on 23 June and a Consolidated B-24 Liberator bomber the following day. In aerial combat over Iași on 8 June, Batz claimed two aerial victories which included his 170th aerial victory. Batz was awarded the Knight's Cross of the Iron Cross with Oak Leaves (Ritterkreuz des Eisernen Kreuzes mit Eichenlaub) on 20 July for 188 victories. He was the 526th member of the German armed forces to be so honored. On 15 August, III. Gruppe moved to Warzyn Pierwszy, Poland. The airfield was located approximately 15 km (9.3 mi) west of Jędrzejów. Here on 17 August, Batz became an "ace-in-a-day" again and achieved his 200th aerial victory. That day, he shot down six Soviet aircraft near Sandomierz during the fighting of the Lvov–Sandomierz offensive. The Oak Leaves were presented by Adolf Hitler at the Führerhauptquartier (Führer Headquarters) at Rastenburg on 25 August 1944. Two other Luftwaffe officers were presented with the Oak Leaves that day by Hitler, the night-fighter pilot Hauptmann Heinz Strüning and the officer of anti-aircraft warfare, Major (Major) Herbert Lamprecht. Following the Oak Leaves presentation, Batz was granted home leave when Batz attended Erich Hartmann's wedding at Bad Wiessee on 10 September.

By the end October 1944, Batz had claimed 226 aircraft shot down, placing him second behind Hartmann in III. Gruppe. On 1 February 1945, Batz was transferred to take command of II. Gruppe of JG 52, based at Veszprém in Hungary. He succeeded Hauptmann Hartmann who had temporarily led the Gruppe after its former commander Major Gerhard Barkhorn had been transferred. Command of III. Gruppe was then passed on to Major Adolf Borchers. Batz was awarded the Knight's Cross of the Iron Cross with Oak Leaves and Swords (Ritterkreuz des Eisernen Kreuzes mit Eichenlaub und Schwertern) on 21 April 1945. The bestowal of the Swords to his Knight's Cross cannot be verified via the records held in the German Federal Archives. Batz presented evidence of the conferment which was confirmed by the Gemeinschaft der Jagdflieger (Association of German Armed Forces Airmen).

On 4 May 1945, II. Gruppe moved to Zeltweg Air Base but did not fly combat missions. On 8 May, General der Flieger Paul Deichmann, the commanding officer of Luftwaffenkommando 4, ordered the cease-fire by 12:00. To avoid capture by Soviet forces, Batz conferred with Deichmann and was ordered to fly his aircraft to Munich, landing at Unterbiberg where they surrendered to US forces, becoming prisoners of war. He and II. Gruppe personnel were then taken to Fürstenfeldbruck where most of the men were released in June 1945. Batz was taken to Bad Aibling where the ground personnel had surrendered and released shortly after.

== Later life ==
LTG 63 emblem

In 1955, Batz applied for service in the West German Air Force, at the time referred to as the Bundesluftwaffe of the Bundeswehr, joining in 1956 holding the rank of Major. Following flight training in the United States, he succeeded Oberstleutnant Karl Rammelt as commander of a training squadron of Flugzeugführerschule "S" (FFS "S"—Pilot Training School) from 1 June to 31 December 1958. In January, pilot training on the Dornier Do 27 was relocated from Memmingen Air Base to Friedrichshafen. On 15 November, FFS "S" was reorganized with Ausbildungsgruppe A (training group A) under command of Batz relocating to Diepholz Air Base. Batz later commanded this training facility at Diepholz Air Base from 1 January 1959 to 15 December 1961. He was succeeded by Oberstleutnat Karl-Horst Meyer zum Felde.

Batz was then appointed Geschwaderkommodore (wing commander) of Lufttransportgeschwader 63 (LTG 63–Air Transport Wing 63) stationed at the Hohn Air Base in Schleswig-Holstein. He commanded the wing from 15 December 1961 to 31 January 1964, surrendering command to Horst Rudat. Promoted to Oberstleutnant (lieutenant colonel), Batz then served as a staff officer with Lufttransportkommando (Air Force Transport Command) in Köln-Wahn and retired on 30 September 1972. Here, he was part of a Bundesluftwaffe team (Führungsstab der Luftwaffe SBWS C-160—Air Force General Staff) planning the introduction of the Transall C-160 transport aircraft. Batz died on 11 September 1988 in a hospital Ebern in Unterfranken. He was buried on the cemetery in Quettingen, a borough of Leverkusen-Opladen.

== Summary of career ==
=== Aerial victory claims ===
According to US historian David T. Zabecki, Batz was credited with 237 aerial victories. According to Spick, Batz was credited with 237 aerial victories claimed in 445 combat missions and a mission-to-claim ratio of 1.88. Of this figure, 232 aerial victories were claimed on the Eastern Front and five over the Western Allies, including two four-engine bombers. Mathews and Foreman, authors of Luftwaffe Aces — Biographies and Victory Claims, researched the German Federal Archives and found records for 233 confirmed and eight unconfirmed aerial victories, numerically ranging from 1 to 233, omitting the 223rd claim. All these victories were claimed on the Eastern Front. The authors Daniel and Gabor Horvath compared Soviet enemy loss reports to Batz's claims over Hungary. In the timeframe 13 to 19 March 1945, Batz claimed eight aerial victories, while the authors found seven matching Soviet losses, a corroboration of 88%.

=== Awards ===
- Wound Badge in Silver
- Honor Goblet of the Luftwaffe on 13 December 1943 as Oberleutnant and pilot (Note: According to Obermaier on 14 November 1943.)
- Front Flying Clasp of the Luftwaffe in Gold with Pennant "400"
- Combined Pilots-Observation Badge
- German Cross in Gold on 28 January 1944 as Oberleutnant in the II./Jagdgeschwader 52.
- Iron Cross (1939)
  - 2nd Class (24 April 1943)
  - 1st Class (3 July 1943)
- Knight's Cross of the Iron Cross with Oak Leaves and Swords
  - Knight's Cross on 26 March 1944 as Oberleutnant (war officer) and Staffelkapitän of the 5./Jagdgeschwader 52
  - 526th Oak Leaves on 20 July 1944 as Hauptmann and Gruppenkommandeur of the III./Jagdgeschwader 52 (Note: According to Scherzer as leader of the III./Jagdgeschwader 52.)
  - (145th) Swords on 21 April 1945 as Major and Gruppenkommandeur of the II./Jagdgeschwader 52. (Note: The Swords to the Knight's Cross were awarded without an official sequential number. The sequential number "145" was assigned by the Association of Knight's Cross Recipients (AKCR).)

=== Dates of rank ===
Wehrmacht
1 November 1940:	Leutnant (Second Lieutenant)
1 April 1943:	Oberleutnant (First Lieutenant)
1 April 1944:	Hauptmann (Captain)
April 1945:	Major (Major)
Bundeswehr
1964:	Oberstleutnant (Lieutenant Colonel)

== Notes ==
Military offices
Preceded by Oberst Joachim Pötter	Commander of Flugzeugführerschule "S"; January 1961 – September 1961	Succeeded by Oberst Horst Merkwitz
Preceded by none	Commander of Lufttransportgeschwader 63; November 1961 – 31 January 1964	Succeeded by Oberst Horst Rudat
