= Bernterode, Breitenworbis =

Bernterode
- Stadtteil of Breitenworbis
- Coat of arms
- Interactive map of Bernterode
- Location within Germany Location within Thuringia
- Coordinates: 51°23′55″N 10°28′33″E
- Country: Germany
- State: Thuringia
- District: Eichsfeld
- Town: Breitenworbis

Area
  - Total: 10.22 km^{2} (3.95 sq mi)
- Elevation: 267 m (876 ft)

Population (2006-12-31)
  - Total: 1,362
  - Density: 133.3/km^{2} (345.2/sq mi)
- Time zone: UTC+01:00 (CET)
  - Summer (DST): UTC+02:00 (CEST)
- Postal codes: 37355
- Dialling codes: 036074, 036076

Bernterode (German pronunciation: [bɛʁntəˈʁoːdə]) is a village and a former municipality in the district of Eichsfeld, Thuringia, Germany. Since 1 September 2009, it is part of the town Breitenworbis.
