= Horst Rudat =

German Air Force general

- Born: 3 May 1920; Wirtkallen (now in Chernyakhovsky District), district Insterburg, East Prussia, Germany
- Died: 31 August 1982 (aged 62); Laaber, West Germany
- Military career
- Allegiance: Nazi Germany; West Germany
- Branch: Luftwaffe; German Air Force
- Service years: 1945; 1956–1980
- Rank: Generalmajor
- Units: KG 55, KG 200
- Commands: LTG 63
- Conflicts: World War II
- Awards: Knight's Cross of the Iron Cross

Horst Rudat (3 May 1920 − 31 August 1982) was a general in the German Air Force. During World War II, he served in the Luftwaffe of Nazi Germany as a bomber pilot.

In the weeks following Operation Overlord, the Allied invasion of France, Rudat was tasked with the leadership of a task force in 2./Kampfgeschwader 101. The task force was experimenting with the Mistel, a Luftwaffe aircraft bombing system, based broadly on the parasite aircraft concept. Rudat led a formation of 4 Mistel aircraft against the invasion fleet of off Normandy in the night of 24/25 June 1944. HMS Nith, a British River-class frigate, was damaged killing nine of her crew.

== Awards ==
- Iron Cross (1939)
  - 2nd Class (9 August 1941)
  - 1st Class (7 September 1941)
- Honour Goblet of the Luftwaffe on 1 June 1942 as Oberleutnant and pilot (Note: According to Kaiser on 27 May 1942.)
- German Cross in Gold on 27 July 1942 as Oberleutnant in the 3./Kampggeschwader 55
- Knight's Cross of the Iron Cross on 24 March 1943 as Oberleutnant and Staffelkapitän of the 2./Kampggeschwader 55

== Notes ==
Military offices
Preceded by Oberstleutnant Wilhelm Batz	Commander of Lufttransportgeschwader 63; 1 February 1964 – March 1971	Succeeded by Oberst Dr. Heinz-Ulrich Beuther
