= Josef Zwernemann =

German World War II fighter pilot (1916–1944)

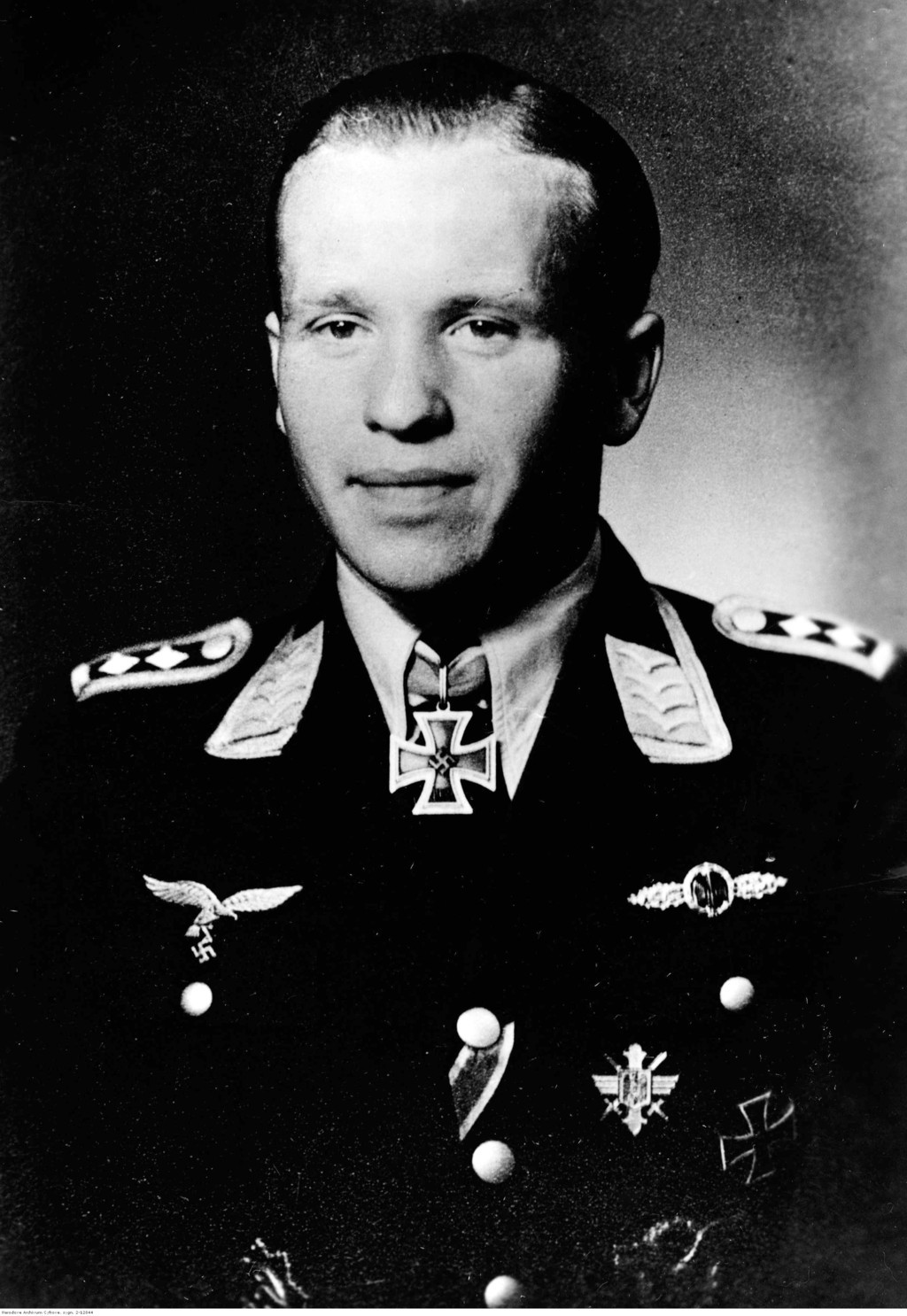
- Born: 26 March 1916; Kirchworbis
- Died: 8 April 1944 (aged 28) near Gardelegen
- Cause of death: Killed in action
- Military career
- Allegiance: Nazi Germany
- Branch: Kriegsmarine (to 1936); Luftwaffe
- Service years: 1935–1944
- Rank: Hauptmann (captain)
- Nickname: "Jupp"
- Units: JG 52, JG 77, JG 11
- Commands: 5./JG 52, 1./JG 11
- Conflicts: See battles World War II: Battle of France; Battle of Britain; Battle of Crete; Eastern Front; Operation Barbarossa; Defense of the Reich †
- Awards: Knight's Cross of the Iron Cross with Oak Leaves

Josef Zwernemann (26 March 1916 – 8 April 1944) was a German Luftwaffe military aviator during World War II and a fighter ace credited with 126 enemy aircraft shot down in over 600 combat missions. The majority of his victories were claimed on the Eastern Front, with ten aerial victories claimed over the Western Front during the Battle of Britain and in Defense of the Reich.

Born in Kirchworbis, Zwernemann volunteered for military service in the Kriegsmarine of Nazi Germany in 1935 and transferred to the Luftwaffe a year later. Following flight training, he was posted to Jagdgeschwader 52 (JG 52—52nd Fighter Wing) in 1940. Zwernemann participated in the Battle of France and Battle of Britain where he claimed his first three aerial victory on 24 July 1940. In July 1941, he fought in the Battle of Crete and Operation Barbarossa, the German invasion of the Soviet Union. Following his 57th aerial victory he was awarded the Knight's Cross of the Iron Cross on 23 June 1942 and the Knight's Cross of the Iron Cross with Oak Leaves on 31 October 1942 after 102 aerial victories.

In December 1943, Zwernemann was appointed Staffelkapitän (squadron leader) of the 1. Staffel (1st squadron) of Jagdgeschwader 11 (JG 11—11th Fighter Wing) which was based in Germany and fighting in Defense of the Reich. Zwernemann claimed nine more victories before he was killed in action in combat with a North American P-51 Mustangs on 8 April 1944.

== Early life and career ==
Zwernemann was born on 26 March 1916 in Kirchworbis in the province of Thuringia. He was the son of a cordwainer who later worked as a miner. Following graduation from school, Zwernemann worked as a clerk (Handlungsgehilfe) in the metal industry. Zwernemann joined the military service of the Kriegsmarine on 1 October 1935 with the 2nd department of the standing ship division of the Baltic Sea in Stralsund. (Note: 2nd company—2. Kompanie) (Note: 2nd department—II. Abteilung) (Note: standing ship division—Schiffsstammdivision) On 2 January 1936, he transferred to the Luftwaffe where he was assigned to the Fliegerhorstkompanie (Airfield Company) in Holtenau.

On 1 April 1938, Zwernemann was promoted to Unteroffizier (non-commissioned officer) and was trained as a pilot. Flight training in the Luftwaffe progressed through the levels A1, A2 and B1, B2, referred to as A/B flight training. A training included theoretical and practical training in aerobatics, navigation, long-distance flights and dead-stick landings. The B courses included high-altitude flights, instrument flights, night landings and training to handle the aircraft in difficult situations.

== World War II ==
World War II in Europe began on Friday 1 September 1939 when German forces invaded Poland. Following flight training, Zwernemann was posted to the newly created 7. Staffel (7th squadron) of Jagdgeschwader 52 (JG 52–52nd Fighter Wing) began on 1 March 1940. At the time, 7. Staffel was commanded by Oberleutnant Herbert Ferner. The Staffel was subordinated to III. Gruppe (3rd group) of JG 52 headed by Major Wolf-Heinrich von Houwald. The Gruppe had been formed on 1 March 1940 at Strausberg and was equipped with the Messerschmitt Bf 109 E-1 and E-3. On 6 April, the Gruppe was moved to Mannheim-Sandhofen Airfield where it was placed under the control of the Stab (headquarter unit) of Jagdgeschwader 53 (JG 53–53rd Fighter Wing).

III./JG 52 insignia

Zwernemann participated in the Battle of France on 10 May 1940. III. Gruppe supported the German attack of Army Group A in northern France, Luxembourg and the area of the Ardennes in southern Belgium. On 18 June, III. Gruppe was withdrawn from combat operations in France and relocated back to Germany. In preparation for the Battle of Britain, the Gruppe began moving to the English Channel on 20 July, arriving at an airfield near Coquelles located southwest of Calais two days later. On 24 July, III. Gruppe flew its first combat air patrols where they encountered Royal Air Force fighters off of Margate during a Kanalkampf mission. In this encounter, Zwernemann claimed his first aerial victory over a Supermarine Spitfire fighter. His Rottenflieger (wing man) on this mission was Edmund Roßmann. That day, 7. Staffel lost its Staffelkapitän Fermer who was killed in action. He was replaced by Oberleutnant Wilhelm Keidel who was killed the next day. Keidel was then temporarily succeeded by Oberleutnant Willy Bielefeld who was also killed on 25 July. This led to the assignment of Hauptmann Erwin Bacsilla as temporary commander of 7. Staffel. The action on 24 July also resulted in the loss of Gruppenkommandeur Houwald who was temporarily succeeded by Hauptmann Wilhelm Ensslen. On 1 August, III. Gruppe was already withdrawn from the English Channel and moved to an airfield at Zerbst for a period of replenishment.

In defense of Germany's southeastern borders, with its primary objective defending the oil fields and refineries at Ploiești, Romania, the Luftwaffenmission Rumänien (Luftwaffe Mission Romania) was created. On 15 October, the Stab and 9. Staffel of III. Gruppe of JG 52 were sent to Bucharest Pipera Airfield, followed by 7. And 8. Staffel in late November. There, the III. Gruppe of JG 52 temporarily became the I. Gruppe of Jagdgeschwader 28 (JG 28—28th Fighter Wing). On 4 January 1941, the Gruppe again became the III. Gruppe of JG 52. There in April, Zwernemann was awarded the Iron Cross 2nd Class (Eisernes Kreuz 2. Klasse). On 25 May, III. Gruppe was sent to Greece where it was subordinated to Jagdgeschwader 77 (JG 77—77th Fighter Wing) and fought in the Battle of Crete.

=== War against the Soviet Union ===
Following its brief deployment in the Balkan Campaign, III. Gruppe was back in Bucharest by mid-June. There, the unit was again subordinated to the Luftwaffenmission Rumänien and reequipped with the new, more powerful Bf 109 F-4 model. On 21 June, the Gruppe was ordered to Mizil in preparation of Operation Barbarossa, the German invasion of the Soviet Union. Its primary objective was to provide fighter protection for the oil fields and refineries at Ploiești. German forces launched the invasion on 22 June. Four days later, Zwernemann claimed his second aerial victory when he shot down a Soviet Ilyushin DB-3 bomber near Constanța. Following two aerial victories claimed over DB-3 bombers on 8 July northeast of Mamaia, he was awarded the Iron Cross 1st Class (Eisernes Kreuz 1. Klasse) in August.

By the end of 1941, Zwernemann had claimed 25 aerial victories, and had been awarded the Honor Goblet of the Luftwaffe (Ehrenpokal der Luftwaffe) on 15 December 1941. In May 1942, the number of victories had increased by 32 and he was honored with the German Cross in Gold (Deutsches Kreuz in Gold) on 25 May 1942. Zwernemann received the Knight's Cross of the Iron Cross (Ritterkreuz des Eisernen Kreuzes) for 57 victories on 23 June 1942. In the month of September 1942 he claimed over thirty victories. On 1 October 1942, Zwernemann was promoted to Leutnant (second lieutenant) with a rank age date 1 October 1941.

Sources differ as to exactly when Zwernemann claimed his 100th aerial victory. According to Obermaier, Zwernemann claimed his 100th to 103rd victories on 1 October 1942. This would make him the 26th Luftwaffe pilot to achieve the century mark. The authors Bergström, Dikov, Antipov, and Sundin indicate that Zwernemann achieved his 100th aerial victory on 31 October. While authors Prien, Stemmer, Rodeike, and Bock date this event on 25 October. This is also the same date listed by Mathews and Foreman. Irrespective, Zwernemann was awarded Knight's Cross of the Iron Cross with Oak Leaves (Ritterkreuz des Eisernen Kreuzes mit Eichenlaub) on 31 October 1942. He was the 141st member of the German armed forces to be so honored. The presentation was made by Adolf Hitler at the Wolf's Lair, Hitler's headquarters in Rastenburg. Two other Luftwaffe officers were presented with the Oak Leaves that day by Hitler, Hauptmann Wolfgang Schenck and Hauptmann Friedrich Lang. One of Zwernemanns' wingmen and students was history's top-scoring ace Erich Hartmann.

On 9 May 1943, Zwernemann was temporarily appointed Staffelführer (squadron leader) of 5. Staffel of JG 52. He succeeded Leutnant Helmut Haberda who had been killed in action on 8 May. He led the Staffel until 26 May when command was passed to Oberleutnant Wilhelm Batz. Zwernemann was then posted to the fighter pilot training school Ergänzungsgruppe Ost. On 1 October, he was promoted to Oberleutnant (first lieutenant) and returned to combat service with 3. Staffel of JG 77 based in Italy. The Staffel was commanded by Leutnant Ernst-Wilhelm Reinert and based at Tuscania.

=== Defense of the Reich and death ===
In November 1943, Zwernemann was transferred to Defense of the Reich duties in Germany. On 15 December 1943, he was posted to 1. Staffel of Jagdgeschwader 11 (JG 11–11th Fighter Wing) which at the time was based at Husum airfield. There, he initially served as acting Staffelführer (squadron leader), representing Hauptmann (Captain) Siegfried Simsch, before officially being appointed Staffelkapitän of 1. Staffel on 8 February 1944.

Zwernemann claimed his first aerial victory in this theater of operations on 10 February 1944. That day, the United States Army Air Forces (USAAF) targeted Braunschweig with 169 Boeing B-17 Flying Fortress bombers from the 3rd Bombardment Division. The primary objective were the Luther-Werke, a mechanical engineering company, and the repair facilities at Waggum. The bombers were escorted by 466 fighter aircraft. Zwernemann claimed the destruction of a Lockheed P-38 Lightning fighter that day. In total, the Luftwaffe claimed 51 aerial victories, including 32 four-engine bombers while the USAAF reported the loss of 30 four-engine bombers and eleven escort fighters.

On 8 April 1944, the Eighth Air Force again targeted Braunschweig as well as various Luftwaffe airfields in northwestern Germany and the Netherlands. In total the USAAF 664 four-engine bombers, escorted by 780 fighters, including 206 North American P-51 Mustangs, were intercepted by 20 Luftwaffe fighter groups. In this encounter, the Luftwaffe claimed 87 aerial victories, including 65 four-engine bombers. This figure includes a B-24 bomber and a P-51 fighter claimed shot down by Zwernemann taking his total to 126 aerial victories. Following this encounter, the USAAF reported the loss of 36 four-engine bombers and 25 escort fighters and claimed at least 158 Luftwaffe aircraft shot down plus further 55 destroyed on the ground. In total the Luftwaffe lost 78 aircraft destroyed, 42 pilots killed and another 13 wounded. Among those pilots killed in action was Zwernemann who was shot down in his Focke-Wulf Fw 190 A-7/R6 (Werknummer 431164—factory number) near Gardelegen, Altmark. His comrades, including Oberleutnant Fritz Engau from 2. Staffel, reported that Zwernemann had bailed out but was shot in his parachute by a P-51 pilot.

Zwernemann was given a military funeral and buried at the cemetery in Kirchworbis on 11 April 1944. His grave was ordered leveled by the authorities of East Germany in 1988. Posthumously, Zwernemann had been promoted to Hauptmann, his rank age backdated to 1 April 1944.

== Summary of career ==
=== Aerial victory claims ===
According to US historian David T. Zabecki, Zwernemann was credited with 126 aerial victories. Spick also list Zwernemann with 126 aerial victories, of which 106 were claimed over the Eastern Front and further 20 over the Western Front and Mediterranean theater, claimed in approximately 600 combat missions. Mathews and Foreman, authors of Luftwaffe Aces – Biographies and Victory Claims, researched the German Federal Archives and found records for 123 aerial victory claims. This figure includes 116 aerial victories on the Eastern Front and seven over the Western Allies, including five four-engined bombers.

Victory claims were logged to a map-reference (PQ = Planquadrat), for example "PQ 49214". The Luftwaffe grid map (Jägermeldenetz) covered all of Europe, western Russia and North Africa and was composed of rectangles measuring 15 minutes of latitude by 30 minutes of longitude, an area of about 360 square miles (930 km^{2}). These sectors were then subdivided into 36 smaller units to give a location area 3 km × 4 km (1.9 mi × 2.5 mi) in size.

Chronicle of aerial victories
This and the ♠ (Ace of spades) indicates those aerial victories which made Zwernemann an "ace-in-a-day", a term which designates a fighter pilot who has shot down five or more airplanes in a single day. This and the ? (question mark) indicates information discrepancies listed by Prien, Stemmer, Rodeike, Bock, Mathews and Foreman.
Claim	Date	Time	Type	Location	Claim	Date	Time	Type	Location
– 7. Staffel of Jagdgeschwader 52 – At the Channel and over England – 26 June – 1 August 1940
1	24 July 1940	13:26	Spitfire	northeast of Margate					
– 7. Staffel of Jagdgeschwader 52 – Operation Barbarossa – 22 June – 5 December 1941
2	26 June 1941	05:45	DB-3	vicinity of Constanța	13	25 September 1941	14:45	I-26 (Yak-1)	
3	8 July 1941	15:56	DB-3	northeast of Mamaia	14	28 September 1941	10:47	R-10 (Seversky)	
4	8 July 1941	16:01	DB-3	northeast of Mamaia	15	25 October 1941	11:45	I-16	
5	14 August 1941	10:40	I-16		16	25 October 1941	15:21	I-61 (MiG-3)	
6	19 August 1941	11:35	I-26 (Yak-1)		17	25 October 1941	15:23	I-61 (MiG-3)	
7	31 August 1941	10:10	I-16		18	31 October 1941	15:32	I-61 (MiG-3)	
8	31 August 1941	10:12	I-16		19	8 November 1941	11:58	I-16	
9	1 September 1941	11:15	I-16		20	9 November 1941	11:20	I-61 (MiG-3)	
10	7 September 1941	09:24	SB-3		21	11 November 1941	10:03	I-16	
11	7 September 1941	09:32	I-17 (MiG-1)		22	16 November 1941	13:30	I-61 (MiG-3)	
12	13 September 1941	17:40	V-11 (Il-2)						
– 7. Staffel of Jagdgeschwader 52 – Eastern Front – 6 December 1941 – 30 April 1942
23	6 December 1941	08:23	I-26 (Yak-1)		29	22 February 1942	15:38	I-61 (MiG-3)	
24	7 December 1941	08:23	I-26 (Yak-1)		30	22 February 1942	15:40	Su-2 (Seversky)	
25	8 December 1941	09:12	I-16		31	8 March 1942	15:35	I-61 (MiG-3)	
26	18 February 1942	09:10	I-61 (MiG-3)		32	17 March 1942	11:29	I-61 (MiG-3)	
27	22 February 1942	15:35	I-61 (MiG-3)		33	7 April 1942	17:10	Pe-2	
28	22 February 1942	15:36	I-61 (MiG-3)						
– 7. Staffel of Jagdgeschwader 52 – Eastern Front – 29 April 1942 – September 1942
34	29 April 1942	17:50	I-61 (MiG-3)		65	26 August 1942	09:10? (Note: According to Mathews and Foreman claimed at 09:11.)	Yak-1	PQ 49214 northeast of Grebenka
35	30 April 1942	14:25	I-61 (MiG-3)		66	27 August 1942	10:39? (Note: According to Mathews and Foreman claimed at 10:30.)	LaGG-3	PQ 49214 northeast of Grebenka
36	1 May 1942	04:33	I-61 (MiG-3)		67	31 August 1942	17:05	Yak-1	PQ 59251
37	2 May 1942	05:03	I-153		68	31 August 1942	17:08	Yak-1	PQ 59252
38	2 May 1942	12:19	I-153		69	31 August 1942	17:15	Yak-1	PQ 59263
39	5 May 1942	11:10	I-61 (MiG-3)		70	1 September 1942	08:34	Il-2	PQ 49393; 25 km (16 mi) south of Stalingrad
40	5 May 1942	12:35	I-16		71	3 September 1942	11:48	LaGG-3	PQ 40781; 15–20 km (9.3–12.4 mi) north of Gumrak
41	8 May 1942	11:14	MiG-1		72	5 September 1942	06:25	P-40	PQ 49533; 30 km (19 mi) southeast of Stalingrad
42	8 May 1942	15:40	MiG-1		73	8 September 1942	16:28	LaGG-3	PQ 40133
43	8 May 1942	15:41	MiG-1		74	8 September 1942	16:30	LaGG-3	PQ 40122
44	8 May 1942	15:45	MiG-1		75	8 September 1942	16:32	LaGG-3	PQ 40142
45	13 May 1942	11:26	MiG-1		76	9 September 1942	16:06? (Note: According to Mathews and Foreman claimed at 16:05.)	Il-2	PQ 49362; 10 km (6.2 mi) south of Stalingrad
46	13 May 1942	14:15	MiG-1		77	9 September 1942	16:06	Il-2	PQ 49334 south of Stalingrad
47	13 May 1942	14:25	MiG-1		78	12 September 1942	16:03	Il-2	PQ 44272; 10 km (6.2 mi) east of Stalingrad
48	14 May 1942	14:30	MiG-1		79	13 September 1942	06:28	Il-2	PQ 49362; 10 km (6.2 mi) south of Stalingrad
49	14 May 1942	14:33	MiG-1		80	13 September 1942	06:30	Il-2	PQ 49334 south of Stalingrad
50	16 May 1942	04:47	MiG-1		81	13 September 1942	06:31	Il-2	PQ 49334 south of Stalingrad
51	16 May 1942	04:53	MiG-1		82	14 September 1942	16:04	LaGG-3	PQ 49413 vicinity of Krasnaya Sloboda
52	16 May 1942	07:24	MiG-1		83	14 September 1942	16:25	Il-2	PQ 49292; 10 km (6.2 mi) east of Stalingrad
53	20 May 1942	09:05	LaGG-3		84♠	22 September 1942	06:32	Yak-1	PQ 40582; 50 km (31 mi) north-northwest of Grebenka
54	21 May 1942	18:40	MiG-1		85♠	22 September 1942	06:36	Yak-1	PQ 40592; 40–45 km (25–28 mi) north of Grebenka
55	24 May 1942	17:55	MiG-1		86♠	22 September 1942	16:12	LaGG-3	PQ 49421; 25 km (16 mi) east of Stalingrad
56	26 May 1942	19:12	LaGG-3		87♠	22 September 1942	16:22	LaGG-3	PQ 49254; 25 km (16 mi) east-northeast of Stalingrad
57	30 May 1942	16:40	Su-2 (Seversky)		88♠	22 September 1942	16:23	LaGG-3	PQ 49253 vicinity of Akhtuba
58	11 June 1942	07:30	LaGG-3		89♠	22 September 1942	16:25	LaGG-3	PQ 49281; 20–30 km (12–19 mi) east of Stalingrad
59	25 June 1942	07:51	MiG-1		90	23 September 1942	06:32	Yak-1	PQ 49122; 15 km (9.3 mi) northwest of Gumrak
60	20 July 1942	16:05	LaGG-3		91	23 September 1942	06:33	Yak-1	PQ 40784; 15–20 km (9.3–12.4 mi) north of Gumrak
61	20 July 1942	16:06	LaGG-3		92	25 September 1942	16:13	Yak-1	PQ 40433; 30 km (19 mi) north of Gumrak
62	20 July 1942	16:10	LaGG-3		93	27 September 1942	08:11	LaGG-3	PQ 49413 vicinity of Krasnaya Sloboda
63	21 July 1942	12:39	LaGG-3		94	27 September 1942	08:12	LaGG-3	PQ 49441; 20 km (12 mi) southeast of Stalingrad
64	21 July 1942	12:42	LaGG-3						
– 9. Staffel of Jagdgeschwader 52 – Eastern Front – October 1942 – 3 February 1943
95	5 October 1942	12:08	LaGG-3	PQ 44574 east of Elkhotovo	104	5 November 1942	13:42	LaGG-3	PQ 44853
96	19 October 1942	07:38	Yak-1	PQ 44454, south of Mozdok	105	5 November 1942	13:44	La-5	PQ 44853
97	19 October 1942	07:40	LaGG-3	PQ 44454, south of Mozdok vicinity of Wosnessnokaja	106	24 November 1942	12:23? (Note: According to Mathews and Foreman claimed at 12:22.)	I-16	PQ 44843
98	19 October 1942	07:40	LaGG-3	PQ 44454, south of Mozdok vicinity of Wosnessnokaja	107	24 November 1942	12:43	Il-2	PQ 44731
99	19 October 1942	07:42	LaGG-3	PQ 4447	108♠	29 November 1942	10:23	Il-2	PQ 44724
100	25 October 1942	15:32	Yak-1	PQ 34403	109♠	29 November 1942	10:25	LaGG-3	PQ 44733
101	25 October 1942	15:35	Yak-1	PQ 34144	110♠	29 November 1942	13:30	LaGG-3	PQ 44762
102	31 October 1942	09:42	LaGG-3	PQ 44752, south of Salugardan	111♠	29 November 1942	13:32	LaGG-3	PQ 44733
103	1 November 1942	11:24	I-16	PQ 44271	112♠	29 November 1942	13:42? (Note: According to Mathews and Foreman claimed at 13:43.)	I-16	PQ 44724
– 9. Staffel of Jagdgeschwader 52 – Eastern Front – 4 February – May 1943
113	15 April 1943	12:58	P-39	PQ 34 Ost 85141, southeast of Krymskaya	116	28 April 1943	16:38	LaGG-3	PQ 34 Ost 75262
114	16 April 1943	14:53	P-39	PQ 34 Ost 85141, northeast of Gelendzhik	117	6 May 1943	17:00	Il-2 m.H. (Note: The "m.H." refers to an Ilyushin Il-2 with rear gunner (mit Heckschütze).)	PQ 34 Ost 75264, west of Krymskaya
115	20 April 1943	16:16	LaGG-3	PQ 34 Ost 75424, west of Gelendzhik					
– 1. Staffel of Jagdgeschwader 11 – Defense of the Reich – 15 December 1943 – 8 April 1944
118? (Note: This claim is not listed by Mathews and Foreman.)	10 February 1944	—	P-38		123	8 March 1944	13:05	B-17	PQ 05 Ost S/FU, vicinity of Schwarmstedt
119	24 February 1944	13:37	B-24	PQ 15 Ost S/NA-7, vicinity of Gotha	124?	8 March 1944	—	P-47	
120?	3 March 1944	—	B-17		125	8 April 1944	13:47	B-24	PQ 15 Ost S/EB, vicinity of Uelzen
121	6 March 1944	11:55	B-17	PQ 05 Ost S/EP, vicinity of Haselünne	126	8 April 1944	13:48	P-51	PQ 15 Ost S/EB, vicinity of Salzwedel
122	6 March 1944	14:18	B-17	PQ 05 Ost S/ES-9, south of Bremen					

=== Awards ===
- Iron Cross (1939)
  - 2nd Class (April 1941)
  - 1st Class (August 1941)
- Honor Goblet of the Luftwaffe on 15 December 1941 as Feldwebel and pilot (Note: According to Obermaier on 12 December 1941.)
- German Cross in Gold on 11 May 1942 as Oberfeldwebel in the III./Jagdgeschwader 52
- Knight's Cross of the Iron Cross with Oak Leaves
  - Knight's Cross on 23 June 1942 as Oberfeldwebel and pilot in the 7./Jagdgeschwader 52
  - 141st Oak Leaves on 31 October 1942 as Oberfeldwebel and pilot in the 7./Jagdgeschwader 52

=== Promotions ===
1 April 1938:	Unteroffizier (non-commissioned officer)
1 November 1940:	Feldwebel (sergeant)
1 November 1941:	Oberfeldwebel (staff sergeant)
1 October 1942:	Leutnant (second lieutenant) with a rank age date 1 October 1941
1 October 1943:	Oberleutnant (first lieutenant)
posthumously:	Hauptmann (captain), backdated to 1 April 1944
