= Eichsfeld-Wipperaue =

- Verwaltungsgemeinschaft
- Map of Eichsfeld highlighting Eichsfeld-Wipperaue
- Interactive map of Eichsfeld-Wipperaue
- Location within Germany Location within Thuringia
- Coordinates: 51°25′N 10°27′E
- Country: Germany
- State: Thuringia
- District: Eichsfeld
- Seat: Breitenworbis
- Subdivisions: 5 municipalities

Area
  - Total: 60.86 km^{2} (23.50 sq mi)

Population (2025-12-31)
  - Total: 7,034
  - Density: 115.6/km^{2} (299.3/sq mi)
- Time zone: UTC+01:00 (CET)
  - Summer (DST): UTC+02:00 (CEST)
- Website: www.eichsfeld-wipperaue.de

Eichsfeld-Wipperaue is a Verwaltungsgemeinschaft ("collective municipality") in the district Eichsfeld, in Thuringia, Germany. The seat of the Verwaltungsgemeinschaft is in Breitenworbis.

The Verwaltungsgemeinschaft Eichsfeld-Wipperaue consists of the following municipalities:

1. Breitenworbis
2. Buhla
3. Gernrode
4. Haynrode
5. Kirchworbis
