= Schleswig Air Base =

Airbase of the German Air Force

Schleswig Air Base
- Fliegerhorst Schleswig
- Jagel, Schleswig-Holstein in Germany
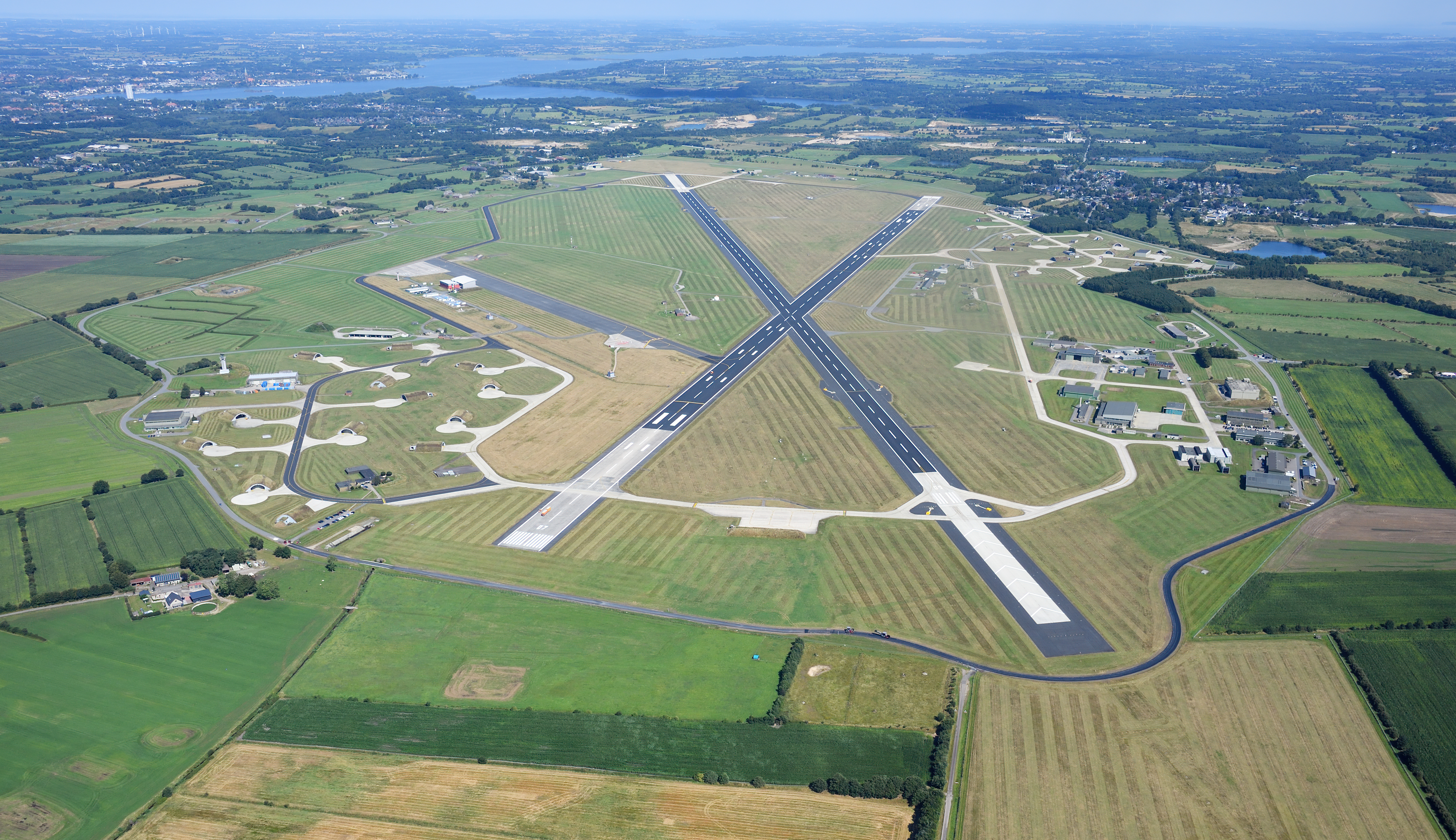

Site information
- Owner: Federal Defence Forces of Germany
- Operator: German Air Force

Location
- Shown within Schleswig-Holstein, Germany
- Coordinates: 54°27′34″N 09°30′59″E

Site history
- Built: 1916
- In use: 1916-

Airfield information
- Identifiers: IATA: WBG, ICAO: ETNS
Runways
Direction	Length and surface
05/23	2,439 metres (8,002 ft) Asphalt
07/25	2,463 metres (8,081 ft) Asphalt

Schleswig Air Base is an airbase of the German Air Force, home to Taktisches Luftwaffengeschwader 51 (Tactical Air Force Wing 51) "Immelmann" (AKG 51) flying reconnaissance variants of the Panavia Tornado. It was formerly known from c.1945-1958 as RAF Schleswigland in Royal Air Force (RAF) use.

== History ==
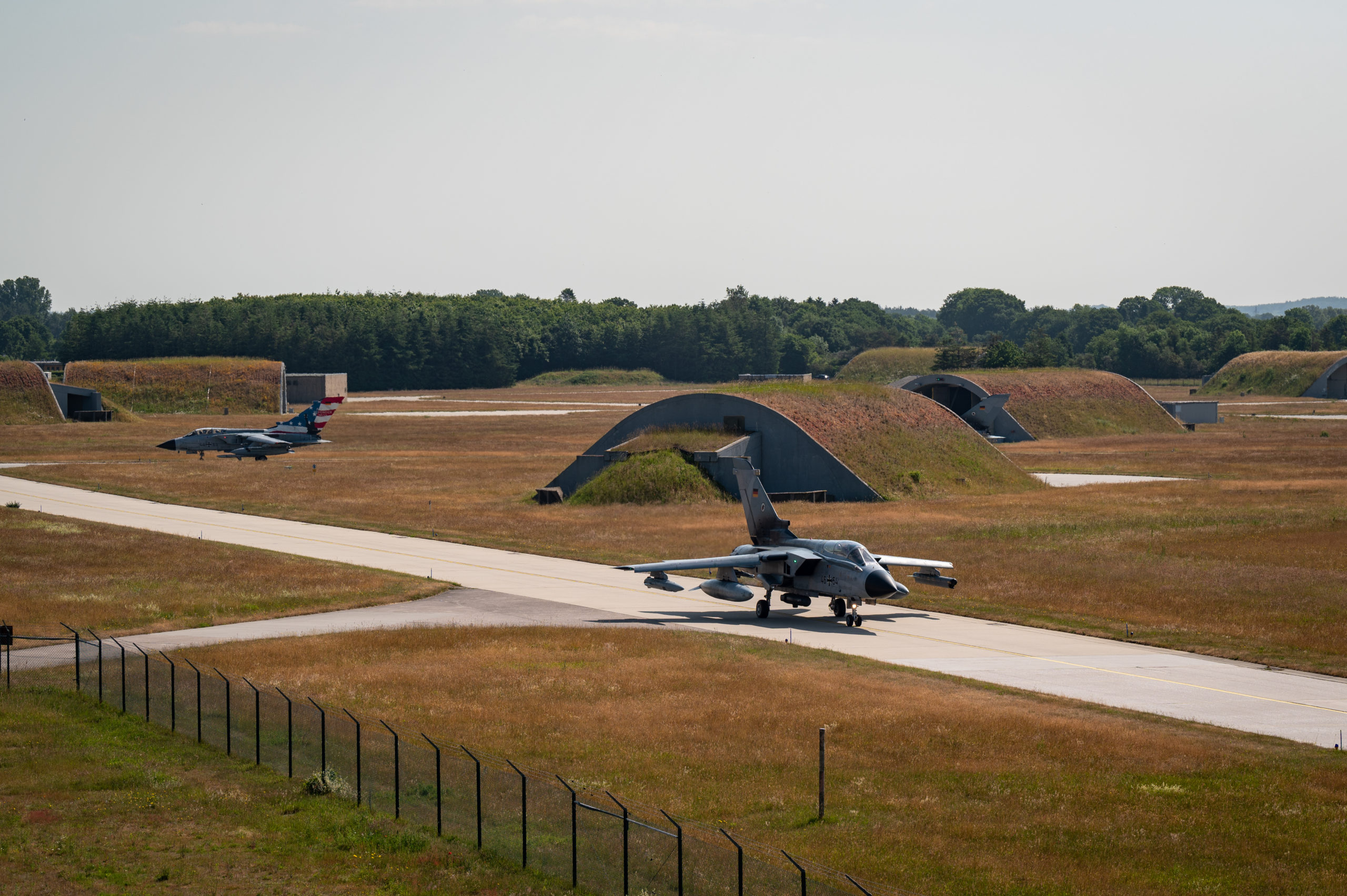
Panavia Tornados at Schleswig during Air Defender 23

The airfield in Schleswig/Jagel was founded in 1916 and has been in military use since. During the Second World War, night fighters were based here, including the Messerschmitt Me 262.

After the end of World War II British Air Force of Occupation took control of the field on 6 May 1945, which they called Airfield B.164. In the summer of 1945 Hawker Typhoon Ibs of No. 121 Wing RAF were based there. In February 1948 RAF Schleswigland became active again as a training field for transport- and glider-aircraft from other stations. RAF Schleswigland was chosen as an operating base for the Berlin Airlift (RAF Codename Operation Plainfare) in the fall of 1948. On 11 November 1948 the first transport aircraft, Handley Page Hastings C.1s of No. 47 Squadron RAF arrived. No. 297 Squadron followed later during the airlift. Civilian companies started using RAF Schleswigland to airlift fuel to Berlin, since Schleswigland was well equipped with underground fuel lines dating from German use during the war. Lancashire Aircraft Corp. started flight on 24 November 1948 which specially converted Handley Page Halifax/Haltons, British American Air Services with Handley Page Halton starting 25 January 1949, Westminster Airways with Handley Page Halton starting 29 January 1949 and Scottish Airlines effective 19 February 1949 with Consolidated Liberator. On 6 October 1949 the last airlift flight operated out of RAF Schleswigland, marking the end of Operation Plainfare.

During the 1950s the 2.TTF was based at RAF Schleswigland with de Havilland Mosquito TT.35 used for target towing. In 1955 King Olav V of Norway visited RAF Schleswigland, since the Royal Norwegian Air Force was using the airfield for training from time to time since the end of the Second World War.

Other units:

- No. 26 Squadron RAF with the Spitfire XIV & XI during 1945
- No. 56 Squadron RAF with the Typhoon IB during 1945
- No. 175 Squadron RAF with the Typhoon IB during 1945
- No. 181 Squadron RAF with the Typhoon IB during September 1945
- No. 182 Squadron RAF with the Typhoon IB during September 1945
- No. 184 Squadron RAF with the Typhoon IB during 1945
- No. 245 Squadron RAF with the Typhoon IB during 1945

The Royal Air Force closed RAF Schleswigland in April 1958 and turned the southern part of the field over to German control. In June 1958 the newly formed German Navy based the Marinefliegergeschwader 1, established on 12 March 1957 as Marinefliegergruppe 1 in Kiel, in what was now known as Schleswig-Jagel.

In October 1959, the northern part of the airfield was handed over from the Royal Air Force to the German Navy. But it wasn't until November 1961 when the British left the last building at Schleswigland. (German text only)

On the airfield it is a part of the major maneuver from June 12 to June 23, 2023, held under the leadership of the German Air Force Air Defender 23 it is the greatest exercise of air forces since NATO was announced.

== Accidents and incidents ==
- 10 March 1949, Avro Lancaster B.1(FE) PA380 of the Central Signals Establishment from RAF Watton required service by a Mobile Repair & Salvage Unit (MRSU) at RAF Schleswigand after unknown accident.
- On 21 March 1949, Handley Page Halton, G-AJZZ, of Lancashire Aircraft Corporation crashed 2 1/2 miles from RAF Schleswigland. 3 crew members were killed in the crash. The radio operator was the only survivor.
- On 5 April 1949, Handley Page Hastings C.1, TG534, of No. 297 Squadron caught fire during engine start-up, broke in half and was destroyed.
- On 19 May 1949, Handley Page Hastings C.1, TG510, of No. 47 Squadron crash landed after undercarriage trouble during take-off. The aircraft was repaired by a Mobile Repair & Salvage Unit (MRSU).
- Unknown date, Handley Page Hastings C.1, TG573, required service by a Mobile Repair & Salvage Unit (MRSU) at RAF Schleswigand after unknown accident.
- On 31 October 1953, de Havilland Mosquito T.3, VP351, port undercarriage hit a snow bank.
- On 24 February 1956, de Havilland Mosquito TT.35, RS717, hit an obstruction in poor visibility.
- On 20 November 1956, de Havilland Mosquito TT.35, TA669, crashed during landing.
- On 17 October 1957, de Havilland Mosquito TT.35, TA686, crashed during takeoff.

== Berlin Airlift casualties at RAF Schleswigland ==
- 15 January 1949, Gd. Eng. Teodor Supernat. Lancashire Aircraft Corporation. Ground accident with an RAF Hastings.
- 15 January 1949, Gd. Eng. Patrick James Griffin. Lancashire Aircraft Corporation. Ground accident with an RAF Hastings.
- 15 January 1949, Gd. Eng. Edward O´Nil. Lancashire Aircraft Corporation. Ground accident with an RAF Hastings.
- 15 January 1949, unknown German lorry driver. Ground accident with an RAF Hastings.
- 21 March 1949, Capt. Robert John Freight. Lancashire Aircraft Corporation. Crash of Handley Page Halton G-AJZZ
- 21 March 1949, Nav Off James Patrick Lewin Sharp. Lancashire Aircraft Corporation. Crash of Handley Page Halton G-AJZZ
- 21 March 1949, Eng Off Henry Patterson. Lancashire Aircraft Corporation. Crash of Handley Page Halton G-AJZZ

== Bibliography ==
- Jefford, C.G. (1988). RAF Squadrons. A comprehensive record of the movement and equipment of all RAF squadrons and their antecedents since 1912. Shrewsbury: Airlife. ISBN 1-85310-053-6.
- Provan, Davies, Machat, Berlin Airlift-The effort and the aircraft- (Paladwr Press, VA USA, 1998) ISBN 1-888962-05-4
- Pearcy, Berlin Airlift (Airlife, Shrewsbury* Pearcy, Berlin Airlury, 1997) ISBN 1-85310-845-6
- Rodrigo, Berlin Airlift (Cassell, London, 1960)
- Lancashire Aircraft Corporation, Berlin Airlift (Walthamstow Press, Walthamstow, 1949)
- Allied Museum Berlin, "A Museum Landing" The Biography of the Hastings TG503 ( Allied Museum, Berlin, 2003)
- Hall, Handley Page Hastings -Warpaint Series No.62 (Warpaint Books, Bletchley)
- Bingham, Handley Page Hastings & Hermes (GMS Enterprises, Peterborough, 1998) ISBN 1-870384-63-6
- Senior, Handley Page Hastings (Verdun Publishing, Stamford, 2008) ISBN 978-1-905414-07-9
