= Air Defender 23 =

Military exercise

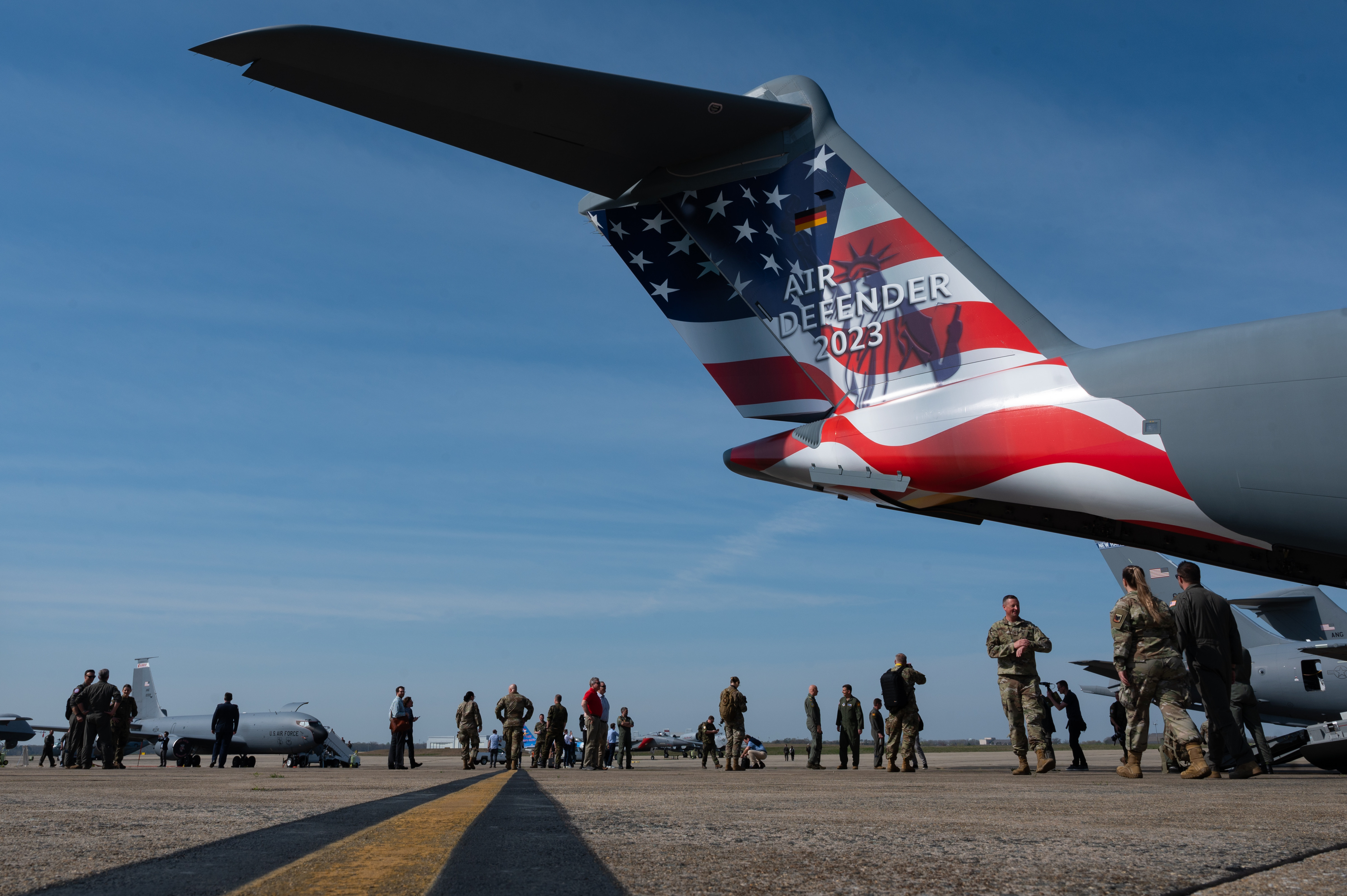
- An Airbus A400M "54+21" of the German Air Force with Air Defender 2023 special painting
- Date: 12–23 June 2023
- Location: Europe
- Organized by: German Air Force

Air Defender 23 is the name of a major maneuver of armed forces of member states of NATO and other European countries in European airspace in 2023. It lasted 10 days, from 12 June to 23 June 2023. Although Air Defender 23 was not an exercise of NATO, but initiated by the Bundeswehr, it was the largest exercise of air forces announced since NATO was founded. The maneuver took place in the airspace of the Federal Republic of Germany, under the leadership of the German Air Force. It involved up to 10,000 soldiers and 250 aircraft from 25 countries.

== Organization and process ==
A map of practice areas, airfields and exercise missions to Estonia and Romania. NATO nations are in yellow

Preparation for the exercise began in 2018. The exercise scenario of Air Defender 23, is that after an attack from the East, Germany asked for assistance according to Article 5 of the North Atlantic Treaty and the allies within NATO reacted according to the alliance. At the beginning of the exercise, around 100 aircraft of the US armed forces were moved to Germany from the United States, most of the Air National Guard from 42 States.

Before the exercise began, there were already relocations of aircraft from the US for Air Defender 23. In German airspace, the training flights took place in three sectors. In the north practice area above the German Bay, Schleswig-Holstein, Bremen, and Lower Saxony, in the East exercise area, above the new federal states and over the German part of the Baltic Sea as well as in the south practice area via Baden-Württemberg, Bavaria, and Rhineland-Palatinate. The exercises took place exclusively on weekdays and during the day.

Each exercise area in Germany involved flights of 40–80 aircraft at a time per day. Around 250 take-offs of military aircraft were planned every day in Germany. During the day, the three airspace sectors were closed to civil aircraft at certain times. For the exercise, the military airfields in Wunstorf (in Lower Saxony), Schleswig, Hohn (both in Schleswig-Holstein), and Lechfeld (in Bavaria) were used. The airfields Laage (in Mecklenburg-Vorpommern), Geilenkirchen (North Rhine-Westphalia), Spangdahlem (in Rhineland-Palatinate), Neuburg (Bavaria), Volkel (in the Netherlands), Krzesiny (in Poland) and Čáslav (in the Czech Republic) were included in the large exercise.

During the maneuver, daily return flights between Germany and Estonia and Germany and Romania were carried out as part of exercise missions. In the East practice area, the defense of the port of Rostock and critical infrastructure in the Baltic Sea, e.g. nautical cables, were simulated.

According to the Bundeswehr, exercise exceptions in the East practice area – took place at flight heights between 2,500 and 15,000 meters. According to the Bundeswehr, the largest mobile fuel camp in German history was built for the large maneuver on the Bundeswehr at Wunstorf Air Base. It has a storage capacity of 2.4 million liters of fuel.

== Involved States ==
Below are listed the exercise participants and the aircraft they participated with:

- Belgium
- Bulgaria
- Croatia
- Czech Republic (staging ground)
- Denmark
- Estonia (staging ground)
- Finland
  - F-18
- France
- Germany (staging ground)
- Greece
  - F-16
- Hungary
  - Gripen
- Italy
- Japan
- Latvia
- Lithuania
- Luxembourg
- Netherlands (staging ground)
  - F-16
  - F-35
- Norway
- Poland (staging ground)
- Romania (staging ground)
  - C-27
- Slovenia
- Sweden
- Spain
  - Eurofighter
- Turkey
  - F-16
- United Kingdom
  - Typhoon FGR.4
  - Voyager KC.3
- United States
  - A-10
  - C-17
  - C-130
  - F-15
  - F-16
  - F-18
  - F-35
  - KC-46
  - KC-135

== Aircraft and drones ==
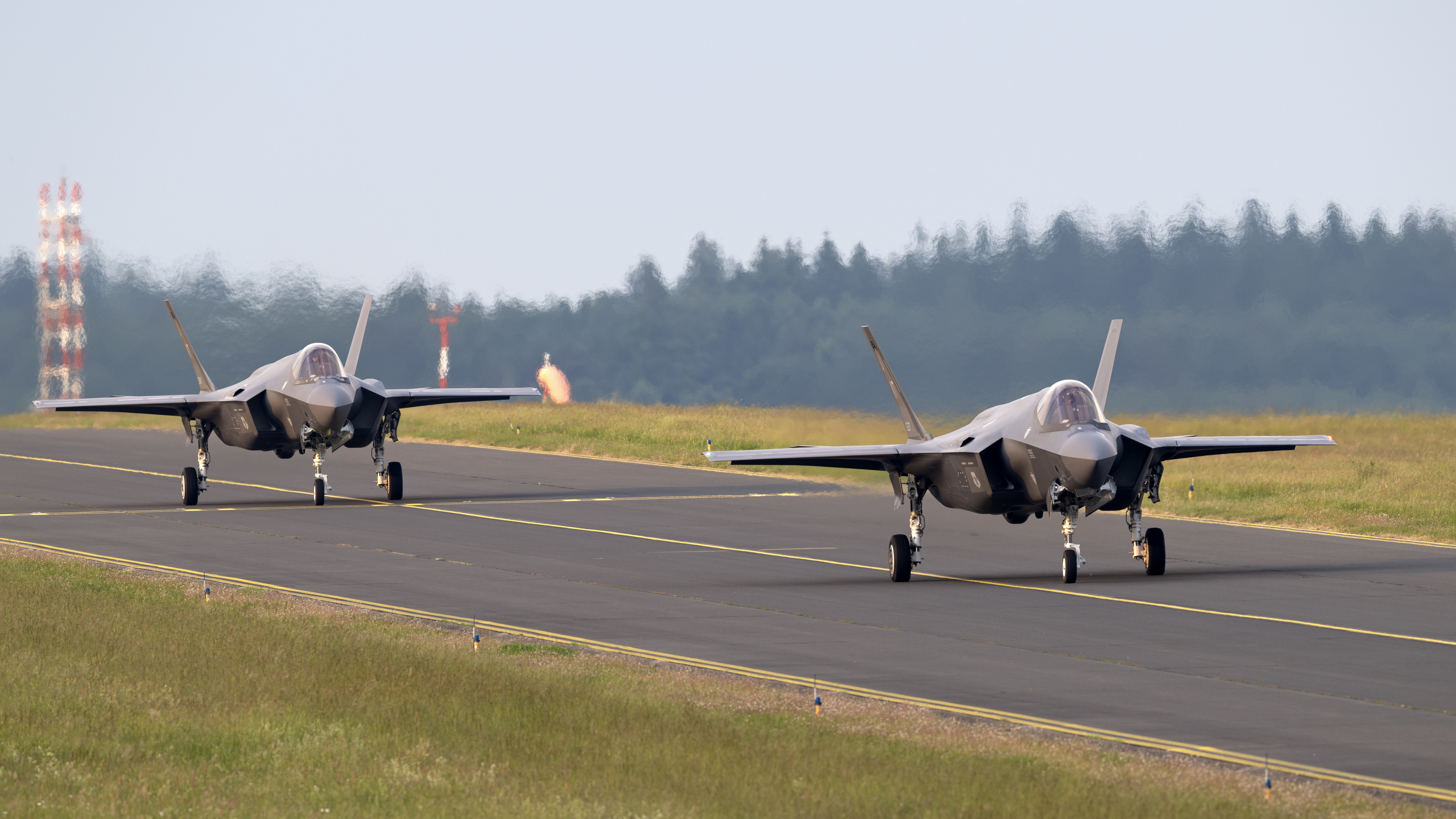
Two U.S. Air Force F-35A Lightning II aircraft prior to the maneuver

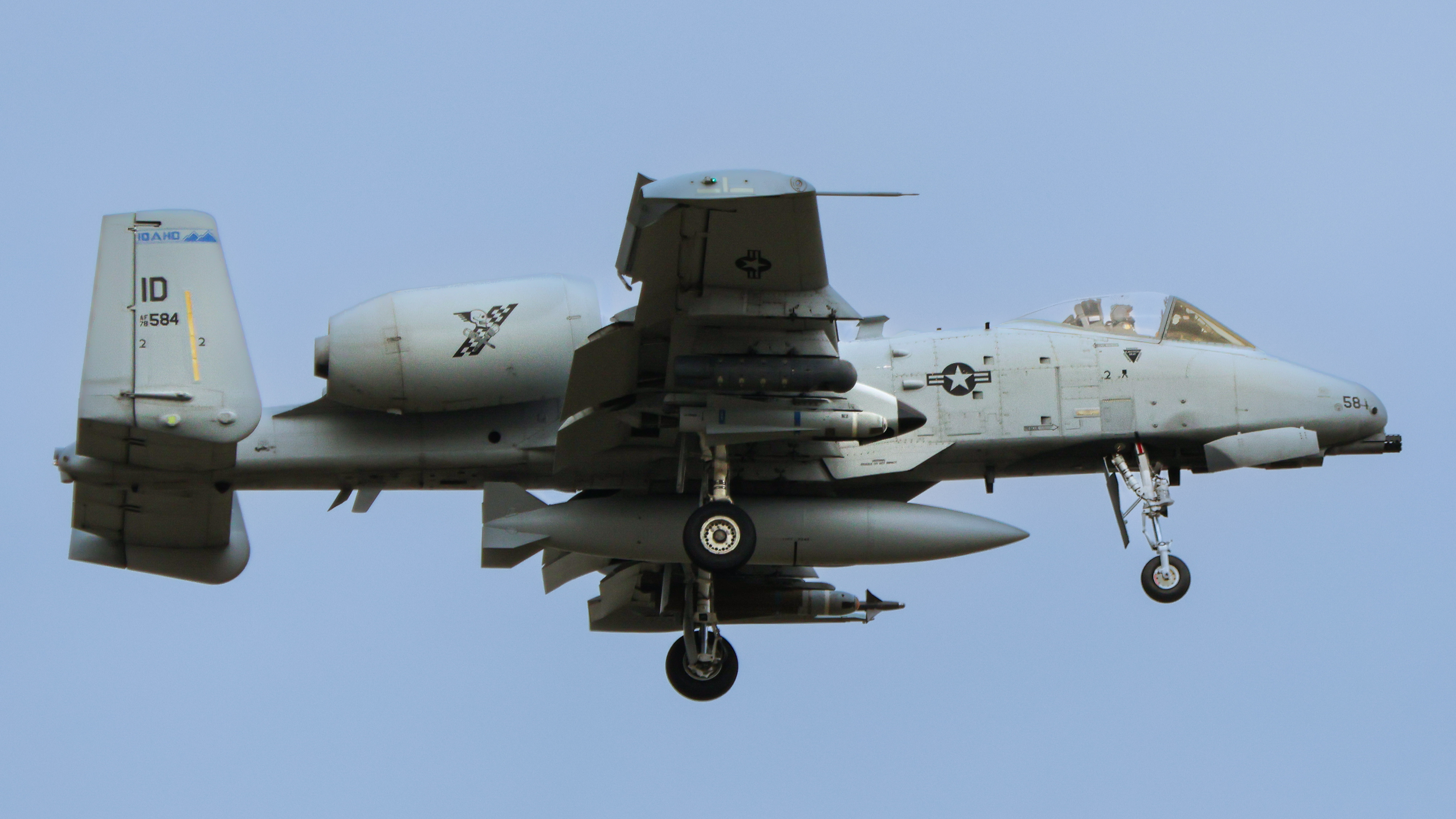
U.S. Air Force Fairchild A-10C Thunderbolt II landing at Lechfeld Air Base during Air Defender 23 exercise.

According to the Bundeswehr, a drone type (General Atomics MQ-9 Reaper) and the following aircraft took part in the maneuver:

- Panavia Tornado
- Eurofighter
- A400
- F-16
- A-10
- F-35
- C-130
- F-18
- F-15
- C-17
- B-1
- KC-46
- C-27
- C-2
- Gripen
- Falcon 20
- KC-135
- C-295
