= Breitenworbis =

- Municipality
- Coat of arms

- Location of Breitenworbis within Eichsfeld district
- Interactive map of Breitenworbis
- Location within Germany Location within Thuringia
- Coordinates: 51°24′42″N 10°25′43″E
- Country: Germany
- State: Thuringia
- District: Eichsfeld
- Municipal assoc.: Eichsfeld-Wipperaue

Government
  - Mayor (2022–28): Cornelius Fütterer (CDU)

Area
  - Total: 24.23 km^{2} (9.36 sq mi)
- Elevation: 300 m (980 ft)

Population (2025-12-31)
  - Total: 3,140
  - Density: 130/km^{2} (336/sq mi)
- Time zone: UTC+01:00 (CET)
  - Summer (DST): UTC+02:00 (CEST)
- Postal codes: 37339
- Dialling codes: 036074
- Vehicle registration: EIC
- Website: www.eichsfeld-wipperaue.de

Breitenworbis (German pronunciation: [ˈbʁaɪtn̩ˌvɔʁbɪs]) is a municipality in the district of Eichsfeld in Thuringia, Germany.
