= Taktisches Luftwaffengeschwader 51 =

Coordinates: 54.4593°N 9.5164°E

Tactical Air Force Wing 51
- Taktisches Luftwaffengeschwader 51 "Immelmann"
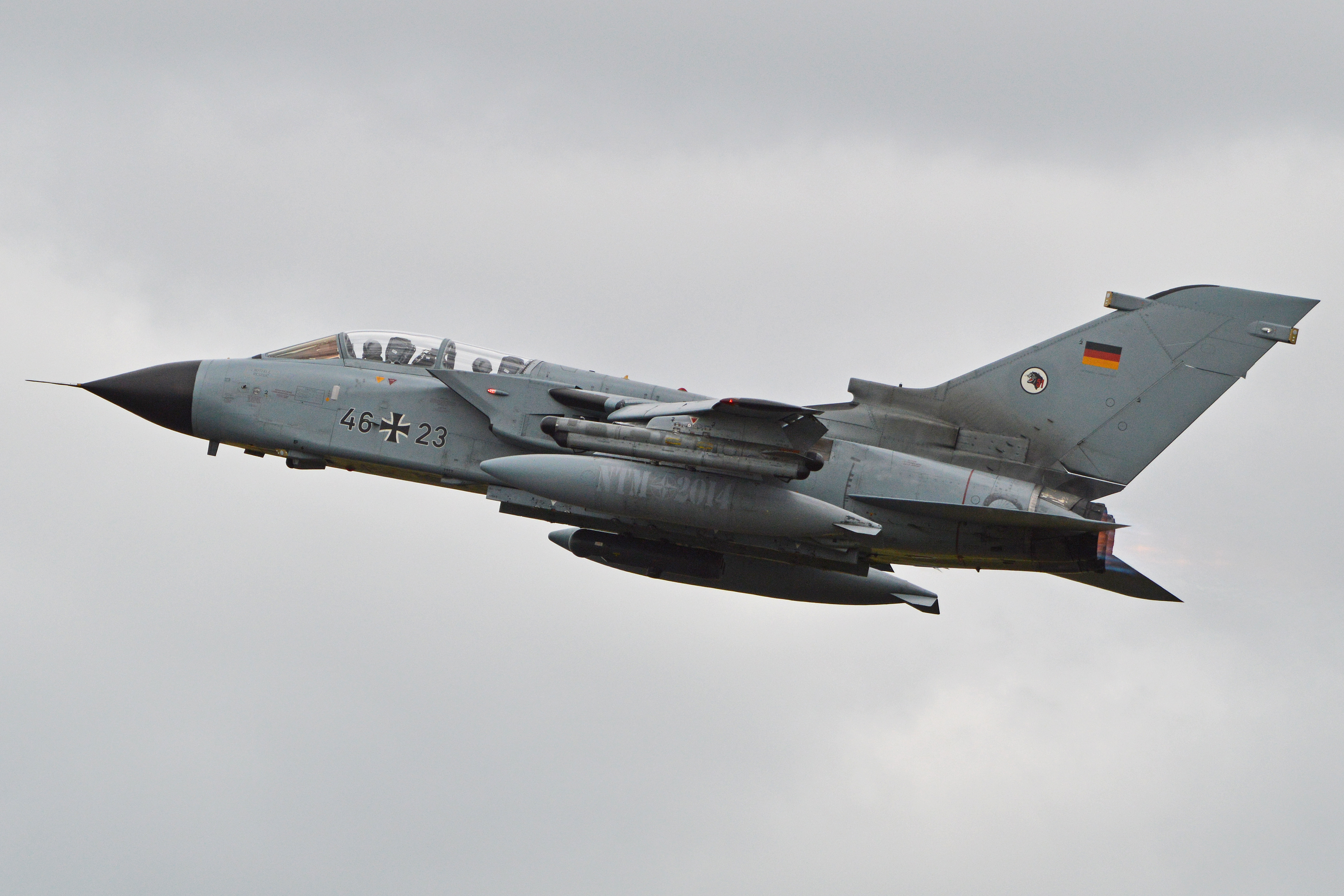
- A Tornado of the wing taking off from Schleswig Air Base in 2014
- Active: 1 July 1992 – present
- Country: Germany
- Branch: German Air Force
- Role: Tactical Reconnaissance; Naval warfare; Suppression of Enemy Air Defenses
- Size: 1564 soldiers 200 civilians
- Part of: Air Force Operations Command (Kommando Einsatzverbände Luftwaffe)
- Garrison/HQ: Schleswig Air Base, Jagel, Schleswig-Holstein (airfield); Kai-Uwe-von-Hassel-Kaserne, Kropp, Schleswig-Holstein (barracks)
- Patron: Max Immelmann

Commanders
- Current commander: Oberst Jörg Schroeder
- Notable commanders: Walter Grasemann

Insignia
- Wing emblem

Aircraft flown
- Electronic warfare: Panavia Tornado
- Reconnaissance: Panavia Tornado, IAI Heron

Taktisches Luftwaffengeschwader 51 "Immelmann" (Tactical Air Force Wing 51 "Immelmann"), formerly known as Aufklärungsgeschwader 51 ("Reconnaissance Wing 51"), is a tactical reconnaissance wing of the German Air Force.

In the beginning of the 1990s, the German Air Force disbanded its two reconnaissance air wings (Aufklärungsgeschwader 51 in Bremgarten and Aufklärungsgeschwader 52 in Leck) and phased out their McDonnell Douglas RF-4E Phantoms. At the same time, the German Navy made the decision to disband one of its two Panavia Tornado fighter-bomber wings. A new dedicated tactical reconnaissance air wing was needed, so in 1992 the Tornado IDS (interdictor/strike) aircraft and manpower of the 1st Flying Squadron of the Navy's MFG-1 together with the Jagel Air Base were transferred to the Air Force to form the new wing under the interim designation Air Force Tornado Wing Jagel. The 2nd Flying Squadron became the third Tornado squadron in the Navy's single remaining fighter-bomber air wing - the MFG-2 at Tarp-Eggebek. A year later in 1993 the wing took over the 51st Reconnaissance Wing (Aufklärungsgeschwader 51 (AG-51)) designation and the honorary name of World War I German flying ace Max Immelmann.

After the German Navy disbanded its fighter-bomber aviation in 2005, the AG 51 took over the maritime strike role. A further reduction of the German Air Force saw the specialized suppression of enemy air defences (SEAD) role and Tornado ECR aircraft of the disbanded JBG-32 in Lechfeld in 2013 transferred to AG-51. The disbandment of Tornado tactical flying training in the US rounded out the wing's current mission package of tactical reconnaissance, electronic warfare, maritime strike and Tornado flying training.

To accomplish its mission, the wing operates 37 Panavia Tornado aircraft as well as 8 IAI Heron drones. The Tornado aircraft are equipped with reconnaissance sensors that are carried in a pod mounted under the fuselage. Depending on the variant used, the reconnaissance pod with optical and infrared sensors, can reconnoiter targets both day and night.

In 2007, to support NATO coalition operations across Afghanistan, Aufklärungsgeschwader 51 "Immelmann" deployed Tornados to Mazar-i-Sharif, Northern Afghanistan.

On 1 October 2013, the unit was renamed in the course of adaptations to the new structure of the German Air Force from Reconnaissance Wing to Tactical Air Force Wing.

== Tasks ==
Originally a pure reconnaissance wing, AG 51 took over the role of naval air warfare in 2005 when Germany's Naval Air Wing 2 was disbanded. The role of Suppression of Enemy Air Defenses was inherited in April 2013 from Jagdbombergeschwader 32 when the latter unit was disbanded.

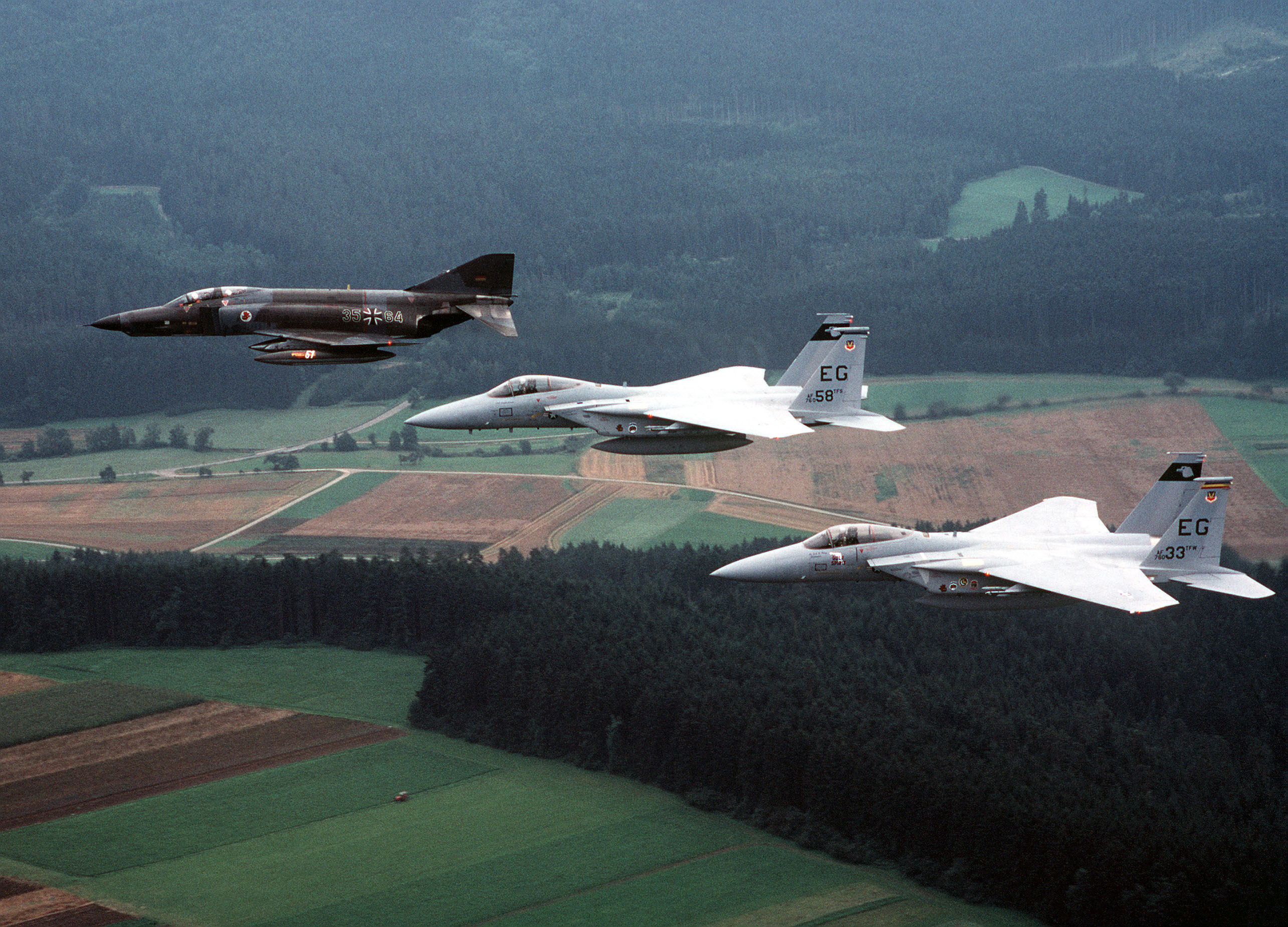
An RF-4E Phantom II of AG 51 and two U.S. Air Force F-15A Eagles in flight over Germany
