= Kirchworbis =

- Municipality
- Coat of arms

- Location of Kirchworbis within Eichsfeld district
- Interactive map of Kirchworbis
- Location within Germany Location within Thuringia
- Coordinates: 51°24′39″N 10°23′50″E
- Country: Germany
- State: Thuringia
- District: Eichsfeld
- Municipal assoc.: Eichsfeld-Wipperaue

Government
  - Mayor (2022–28): Rüdiger Banse

Area
  - Total: 5.45 km^{2} (2.10 sq mi)
- Elevation: 315 m (1,033 ft)

Population (2025-12-31)
  - Total: 1,282
  - Density: 235/km^{2} (609/sq mi)
- Time zone: UTC+01:00 (CET)
  - Summer (DST): UTC+02:00 (CEST)
- Postal codes: 37339
- Dialling codes: 036074
- Vehicle registration: EIC
- Website: www.kirchworbis.de

Kirchworbis is a municipality in the district of Eichsfeld in Thuringia, Germany. Kirchworbis lies to the south of the Langenberg, a summit in the Ohm Hills.

Kirchworbis is first mentioned in a 1209 document as "Kirchworvece." Part of the Electorate of Mainz since the Middle Ages, the place became part of Prussia in 1802. After a short affiliation with the Kingdom of Westphalia, Kirchworbis was part of the Prussian Province of Saxony until 1945. During World War II, more than 100 women and men from Poland and Ukraine were brought to Kirchworbis and forced to work on farms, starting in 1940. From 1945 to 1949, Kirchworbis was in the Soviet occupied zone, and was part of East Germany from 1949 until German reunification in 1990.
