= Hohn Air Base =

Hohn Air Base Fliegerhorst Hohn
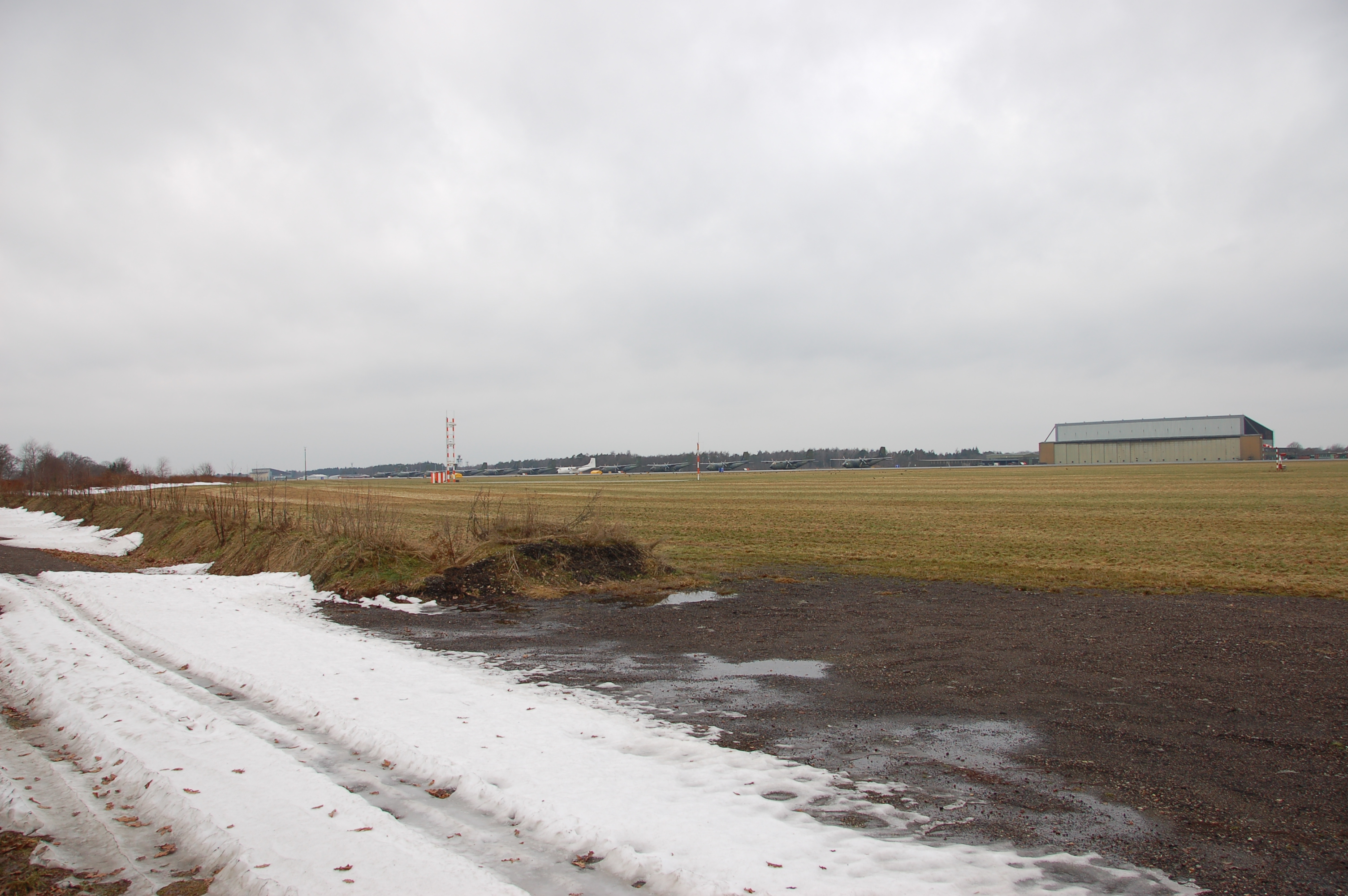
- IATA: QCN; ICAO: ETNH

Summary
- Airport type: Military
- Operator: German Air Force
- Location: Hohn
- Elevation AMSL: 39 ft / 12 m
- Coordinates: 54°18′49″N 09°32′17″E
- Interactive map of Hohn Air Base

Runways
Direction	Length		Surface
Direction	ft	m	Surface
08/26		2,440	Concrete

Hohn Air Base is a military air base in Germany. It was home to the Lufttransportgeschwader 63 (LTG 63 for short, Air Transport Wing 63 in English) of the German Air Force (Luftwaffe).

== Usage ==
Since May 1968, the Transall C-160 has been operated from the base. During 2013 Air Transport Wing 63 was disbanded and subsequently it was announced that the air base would be given up by the German Air Force. However, they announced in 2019 the airfield would be kept open as a diversion facility for air bases in Northern Germany.

On the airfield it is a part of the major maneuver from June 12 to June 23, 2023, held under the leadership of the German Air Force Air Defender 23 it is the greatest exercise of air forces since NATO was announced.
