= 71st Tactical Fighter Squadron =

71st Tactical Fighter Squadron may refer to:

- 71st Fighter Training Squadron, USAF
- 71st Tactical Fighter Squadron (Richthofen) of the German Luftwaffe
