= Friedrich Haas =

WWII Luftwaffe fighter ace

- Born: 20 January 1924; Dillenburg, Weimar Republic
- Died: 9 April 1945 (aged 21); Vienna, Nazi Germany
- Cause of death: Killed in action
- Burial place: Oberwölbling German war cemetery
- Military career
- Allegiance: Nazi Germany
- Branch: Luftwaffe
- Service years: 1943–1945
- Rank: Leutnant (second lieutenant)
- Unit: JG 52
- Conflicts: World War II; Eastern Front
- Awards: German Cross; Knight's Cross of the Iron Cross Posthumous

Friedrich Haas (20 January 1924 – 9 April 1945) was a Luftwaffe fighter ace from Dillenburg/Hesse, Germany and recipient of the Knight's Cross of the Iron Cross during World War II. Friedrich Haas was credited with 74 aerial victories all over the Eastern Front (World War II). Haas was shot down and killed in 1945 over Vienna, Austria.

== Early life and career ==
Haas was born on 20 January 1924 in Dillenburg, then in the People's State of Hesse within the Weimar Republic. Following flight training, (Note: Flight training in the Luftwaffe progressed through the levels A1, A2 and B1, B2, referred to as A/B flight training. A training included theoretical and practical training in aerobatics, navigation, long-distance flights and dead-stick landings. The B courses included high-altitude flights, instrument flights, night landings and training to handle the aircraft in difficult situations.) he was posted to 5. Staffel (5th squadron) of Jagdgeschwader 52 (JG 52—52nd Fighter Wing) in late 1943 which was fighting on the Eastern Front of World War II. At the time, the Staffel was commanded by Oberleutnant Wilhelm Batz and subordinated to II. Gruppe (2nd group) of JG 52 headed by Hauptmann Gerhard Barkhorn.

== World War II ==
World War II in Europe had begun on Friday 1 September 1939 when German forces invaded Poland. In November 1943, the Red Army launched the Kerch–Eltigen operation leading to the Crimean offensive in early 1944. On 2 November, II. Gruppe of JG 52 was moved to Baherove where elements of the Gruppe remained until 19 March 1944. Here on 6 December 1943, Haas claimed his first aerial victory, a Yakovlev Yak-1 fighter shot down near Cape Tusla. While based at Baherove, Haas claimed four further aerial victories, all Bell P-39 Airacobra fighters, one each on 29 December 1944, 3 and 12 January, and 1 February 1944. For these claims, he was awarded the Iron Cross 2nd Class (Eisernes Kreuz zweiter Klasse). Haas' squadron was often outnumbered and short on fuel at this late stage of the war. On 28 February, 4. and 5. Staffel was ordered to Grammatikowo located near Sovietskyi for a period of two weeks, returning to Baherove on 13 March. On 19 March, the entire II. Gruppe relocated to Grammatikowo. Here on 7 April, Haas claimed a Yakovlev Yak-7 fighter shot down.

On 8 April, Soviet forces launched the Crimean offensive, eventually forcing the Germans to evacuate the Crimea. On 14 April, II. Gruppe moved to an airfield at Cape Chersonesus located at the Sevastopol Bay. By end-May 1944, Haas increased his number of aerial victories claimed to 30, including an "ace-in-a-day" achievement on 7 May. The Gruppe was retreated to Huși at the Prut River on 27 May and to an airfield at Manzar located south of Tiraspol on 11 June. Here, Haas increased his aerial victories to 35 which put him in fifth place with respect to the most successful active pilots of II. Gruppe at the time.

On 9 July, II. Gruppe began relocating to an airfield at Zamość-Mokre then in the General Government 80 kilometers (50 miles) southeast of Lublin. The next day on a transfer flight, Haas was forced to make an emergency landing when his Messerschmitt Bf 109 G-6 (Werknummer 163574—factory number) ran out of fuel near Boryslav in a location 35 kilometers (22 miles) west of Stryi and sustained injuries. At the time. the Gruppe had only seven serviceable aircraft and nine pilots. On 26 July 1944, Haas was awarded the German Cross in Gold (Deutsches Kreuz in Gold).

Following his convalescence, Haas returned to 5. Staffel, then under the command of Hauptmann Heinrich Sturm in October. Based at Hungarian airfields at Nagyrábé, Debrecen, Tiszalök and Taktakenéz, Haas claimed four aerial victories in October 1944, reaching 50 by end-1944.

=== Squadron leader and death ===
On 1 February 1945, Haas succeeded Hauptmann Erich Hartmann as Staffelkapitän (squadron leader) of 4. Staffel of JG 52. On 1 March, this Staffel was renamed and became the 5. Staffel of JG 52. At the same time, the former 5. Staffel was also renamed and became the 6. Staffel. At the time, II. Gruppe was based at Veszprém in Hungary.

On 6 April 1945, II. Gruppe moved to an airfield named "Garonne" located near Fels am Wagram. Operating from this airfield on 9 April, Haas was shot down over Vienna and though he managed to bail out from his Bf 109 G at low altitude, he struck the vertical stabilizer and fell to his death. He was posthumously awarded the Knight's Cross of the Iron Cross (Ritterkreuz des Eisernen Kreuzes) in April. Haas was succeeded by Leutnant Paul Linxen as commander of 5. Staffel. At the time, Haas was credited with 74 aerial victories, making him the fifth most successful fighter pilot of II. Gruppe. He is buried at the Oberwölbling German war cemetery in Wölbling, Austria (Block 2, Row 9, Grave 401).

== Summary of career ==
=== Aerial victory claims ===
According to US historian David T. Zabecki, Haas was credited with 74 aerial victories. The authors Barbas, Jacobs, Obermaier and Spick also list him with 74 aerial victories claimed in 385 combat missions. Mathews and Foreman, authors of Luftwaffe Aces — Biographies and Victory Claims, researched the German Federal Archives and found records for 50 aerial victory claims recorded on the Eastern Front.

Victory claims were logged to a map-reference (PQ = Planquadrat), for example "PQ 66671". The Luftwaffe grid map (Jägermeldenetz) covered all of Europe, western Russia and North Africa and was composed of rectangles measuring 15 minutes of latitude by 30 minutes of longitude, an area of about 360 square miles (930 km^{2}). These sectors were then subdivided into 36 smaller units to give a location area 3 km × 4 km (1.9 mi × 2.5 mi) in size.

Chronicle of aerial victories
This and the ♠ (Ace of spades) indicates those aerial victories which made Haas an "ace-in-a-day", a term which designates a fighter pilot who has shot down five or more airplanes in a single day. This and the ? (question mark) indicates information discrepancies listed by Barbas, Prien, Stemmer, Balke, Bock, Mathews and Foreman.
Claim	Date	Time	Type	Location	Claim	Date	Time	Type	Location
– 5. Staffel of Jagdgeschwader 52 – Eastern Front — December 1943
1	6 December 1943	10:33	Yak-1	northwest of Cape Tusla	2	29 December 1943	12:35	P-39	southeast of Kerch
– 5. Staffel of Jagdgeschwader 52 – Eastern Front — 1 January – 31 December 1944
3	3 January 1944	08:26	P-39	PQ 34 Ost 66671 east of Kerch	28	31 May 1944	06:41	Il-2 m.H. (Note: The "m.H." refers to an Ilyushin Il-2 with rear gunner (mit Heckschütze).)	PQ 24 Ost 78681; 20 km (12 mi) northeast of Iași
4	12 January 1944	06:55	P-39	PQ 34 Ost 66613 vicinity of Cape Tarchan; Adshim-Uschkai	29	31 May 1944	06:53	Il-2 m.H.	PQ 24 Ost 78821, northeast of Iași vicinity of Iași; 10 km (6.2 mi) south of Iași
5	1 February 1944	14:58	P-39	PQ 34 Ost 66613 vicinity of Cape Khroni	30	31 May 1944	10:37	Il-2 m.H.	PQ 24 Ost 78821, northeast of Iași vicinity of Iași; 10 km (6.2 mi) south of Iași
6	7 April 1944	11:38	Yak-7	PQ 34 Ost 37892; 20 km (12 mi) southeast of Perekop	31	1 June 1944	13:36	La-5? (Note: According to Barbas, Mathews and Foreman claimed as a Bell P-39 Airacobra.)	PQ 24 Ost 78821, northeast of Iași vicinity of Iași; 10 km (6.2 mi) south of Iași
7	15 April 1944	06:41	Il-2 m.H.	PQ 34 Ost 35481; 15 km (9.3 mi) southeast of Sevastopol	32	2 June 1944	08:42	P-39	PQ 24 Ost 78812, north of Iași vicinity of Iași; 10 km (6.2 mi) south of Iași
8	15 April 1944	06:41? (Note: According to Barbas, Mathews and Foreman claimed at 06:43.)	Yak-7	PQ 34 Ost 35483; 15 km (9.3 mi) southeast of Sevastopol	33	2 June 1944	15:42? (Note: According to Barbas, Mathews and Foreman claimed at 15:41.)	Yak-7	PQ 24 Ost 78812, north of Iași vicinity of Iași; 10 km (6.2 mi) south of Iași
9	15 April 1944	15:20	Il-2 m.H.	PQ 34 Ost 35391; Black Sea, southwest of Sevastopol	34	3 June 1944	18:38	P-39	PQ 24 Ost 78673 vicinity of Cârpiţi; 15 km (9.3 mi) north of Iași
10	18 April 1944	10:38	Il-2 m.H.	PQ 34 Ost 35444 vicinity of Sevastopol	35	4 June 1944	12:49? (Note: According to Barbas claimed at 12:41.)	Boston	PQ 24 Ost 8771 vicinity of Abony
11	19 April 1944	17:23	Il-2 m.H. ? (Note: According to Barbas, Mathews and Foreman claimed as a Yakovlev Yak-7.)	PQ 34 Ost 35451 vicinity of Dzhankoi; 15 km (9.3 mi) east of Sevastopol	36	16 October 1944	16:07	Yak-11	PQ 24 Ost 18891; 10 km (6.2 mi) northwest of Oradea
12	27 April 1944	17:52	P-39	PQ 34 Ost 35483; 15 km (9.3 mi) southeast of Sevastopol	37	18 October 1944	12:03	Yak-11	PQ 24 Ost 18814; 35 km (22 mi) south of Debrecen
13	4 May 1944	07:45	Yak-7	PQ 34 Ost 35363; Black Sea, 10 km (6.2 mi) west of Sevastopol	38	19 October 1944	10:21	La-5	PQ 24 Ost 18444; 15 km (9.3 mi) south-southwest of Debrecen
14	4 May 1944	07:48	Yak-9	PQ 34 Ost 35334 vicinity of Belbek; Black Sea, 15 km (9.3 mi) northwest of Sevastopol	39	30 October 1944	14:09	La-5	PQ 24 Ost 08765; 20 km (12 mi) east of Szolnok
15	6 May 1944	13:22	Il-2 m.H.	PQ 34 Ost 35442 vicinity of Belbek vicinity of Sevastopol	40	1 November 1944	13:47	Yak-9	PQ 14 Ost 97263 east of Kecskemét
16	6 May 1944	13:25	Yak-7	PQ 34 Ost 35441 vicinity of Dzhankoi; 15 km (9.3 mi) east of Sevastopol	41	23 November 1944	08:38	Yak-9	PQ 14 Ost 98432; PQ 98436 vicinity of Atkár
17♠	7 May 1944	09:32	Yak-7	PQ 34 Ost 35472 vicinity of Balaklava; 10 km (6.2 mi) south of Sevastopol	42	23 November 1944	11:46	Il-2 m.H.	PQ 24 Ost 08174; 30 km (19 mi) south-southeast of Miskolc
18♠	7 May 1944	09:36	Il-2 m.H.	PQ 34 Ost 35472 vicinity of Balaklava; 10 km (6.2 mi) south of Sevastopol	43	5 December 1944	08:21? (Note: According to Barbas, Mathews and Foreman claimed at 08:57.)	Yak-9	PQ 14 Ost 98742; PQ 98445 west of Tura
19♠	7 May 1944	09:39? (Note: According to Barbas claimed at 09:37.)	Il-2 m.H.	PQ 34 Ost 35471; 10 km (6.2 mi) south of Sevastopol	44	5 December 1944	09:45? (Note: According to Barbas, Mathews and Foreman claimed at 09:00.)	Il-2 m.H.	PQ 14 Ost 98454; 20 km (12 mi) southwest of Gyöngyös
20♠	7 May 1944	15:14	Yak-7	PQ 34 Ost 35612; Black Sea, 10 km (6.2 mi) south of Sevastopol	45	11 December 1944	09:58	Yak-9	PQ 14 Ost 98354
21♠	7 May 1944	15:20	P-40	PQ 34 Ost 35453, east of Sevastopol; 15 km (9.3 mi) east of Sevastopol	46	11 December 1944	10:03	Yak-9	PQ 14 Ost 98352; PQ 98355; 30 km (19 mi) north-northeast of Budapest
22	8 May 1944	10:46	Yak-7	PQ 34 Ost 35612 vicinity of Balaklava; Black Sea, 10 km (6.2 mi) south of Sevastopol	47	20 December 1944	09:08	Yak-9	PQ 14 Ost 88843; PQ 88848 vicinity of Seregélyes
23	8 May 1944	10:55	Yak-7	PQ 34 Ost 35392; Black Sea, southwest of Sevastopol	48	20 December 1944	09:11	Yak-9	PQ 14 Ost 87211; 15 km (9.3 mi) northwest of Dunaújváros
24	9 May 1944	11:33	Yak-7	PQ 34 Ost 35471; 10 km (6.2 mi) south of Sevastopol	49	21 December 1944	13:14	Yak-9	PQ 14 Ost 88844 vicinity of Seregélyes
25	9 May 1944	14:12	Yak-7	PQ 34 Ost 35472 vicinity of Balaklava; 10 km (6.2 mi) south of Sevastopol	50	21 December 1944	13:14	Yak-9	PQ 14 Ost 88844 vicinity of Seregélyes
26	29 May 1944	08:43	Pe-2	PQ 24 Ost 87854; PQ 87254; 15 km (9.3 mi) south-southwest of Kishinev	51? (Note: This claim is not listed by Barbas, nor by Mathews and Foreman.)	22 December 1944	—	unknown	
27	30 May 1944	14:53	P-39	PQ 24 Ost 78674 vicinity of Huși; 8 km (5.0 mi) north of Iași	52?	22 December 1944	—	unknown	

=== Awards ===
- Iron Cross (1939) 2nd and 1st Class
- German Cross in Gold on 26 July 1944 as Unteroffizier in the 5./Jagdgeschwader 52
- Knight's Cross of the Iron Cross on 26 April 1945 as Leutnant and Staffelführer of the 5./Jagdgeschwader 52
