= Erich Hartmann =

German World War II flying ace (1922–1993)

- Erich Alfred Hartmann
- Hartmann, 1942–1944
- Born: 19 April 1922; Weissach, Württemberg, Weimar Republic
- Died: 20 September 1993 (aged 71); Weil im Schönbuch, Germany
- Burial place: New Cemetery, Weil im Schönbuch
- Military career
- Allegiance: Nazi Germany; West Germany
- Branch: Luftwaffe (Wehrmacht); German Air Force (Bundeswehr)
- Service years: 1940–1945; 1956–1970
- Rank: Major (Wehrmacht); Oberst (Bundeswehr)
- Nicknames: Bubi ("The Kid"); Der Schwarze Teufel ("The Black Devil")
- Units: JG 52, JG 53 and JG 71
- Commands: I./JG 52 and JG 71
- Conflicts: World War II; Eastern Front; Defence of the Reich
- Awards: Knight's Cross of the Iron Cross with Oak Leaves, Swords and Diamonds
- Other work: Civilian flight instructor

Erich Alfred Hartmann (19 April 1922 – 20 September 1993), nicknamed Bubi, was a German fighter pilot during World War II and the most successful fighter ace in the history of aerial warfare. He flew 1,404 combat missions and participated in aerial combat on 825 separate occasions. He was credited with shooting down a total of 352 Allied aircraft: 345 Soviet and 7 American while serving with the Luftwaffe. During his career, Hartmann was forced to crash-land his fighter 16 times after either mechanical failure or damage received from parts of enemy aircraft he had shot down; he was never shot down by direct enemy action.

Hartmann, a pre-war glider pilot, joined the Luftwaffe in 1940 and completed his fighter pilot training in 1942. He was posted to the veteran Jagdgeschwader 52 (JG 52—52nd Fighter Wing) on the Eastern Front. On 29 October 1943, Hartmann was awarded the Knight's Cross of the Iron Cross for destroying 148 enemy aircraft and ultimately the coveted Knight's Cross of the Iron Cross with Oak Leaves, Swords and Diamonds on 25 August 1944 for 301 aerial victories. At the time of its presentation to Hartmann, this was Germany's highest military decoration. (Note: In 1944, the Knight's Cross of the Iron Cross with Oak Leaves, Swords and Diamonds was second only to the Grand Cross of the Iron Cross (Großkreuz des Eisernen Kreuzes), which was awarded only to senior commanders for winning a major battle or campaign, in the military order of the Third Reich. The Knight's Cross of the Iron Cross with Oak Leaves, Swords and Diamonds as the highest military order was surpassed on 29 December 1944 by the Knight's Cross of the Iron Cross with Golden Oak Leaves, Swords and Diamonds (Ritterkreuz des Eisernen Kreuzes mit Goldenem Eichenlaub, Schwertern und Brillanten).)

Hartmann achieved his 352nd and last aerial victory at midday on 8 May 1945, hours before the German surrender. Along with the remainder of JG 52, he surrendered to United States Army forces and was turned over to the Red Army. He was tried on war crimes charges and convicted. Hartmann was initially sentenced to 20 years of imprisonment, later increased to 25 years, and spent 10 years in Soviet prison camps and gulags until he was released in 1955. In 1997, the Russian Federation posthumously cleared him of all charges.

In 1956, Hartmann joined the newly established West German Luftwaffe in the Bundeswehr, and became the first Geschwaderkommodore of Jagdgeschwader 71 "Richthofen". He was forced into retirement in 1970 for his opposition to the procurement of the F-104 Starfighter over safety concerns. In his later years, after his military career had ended, he became a civilian flight instructor. Hartmann died on 20 September 1993 at age 71.

== Early life and career ==
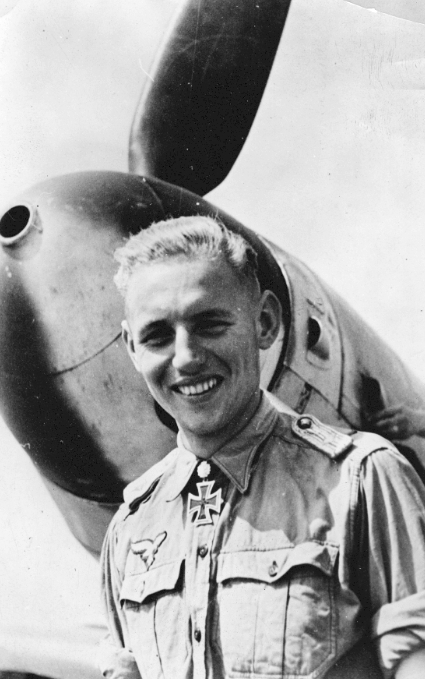
Lieutenant Erich Hartmann for his Bf 109 (G-6)

Erich Hartmann was born on 19 April 1922 in Weissach, Württemberg, to Doctor Alfred Erich Hartmann and his wife, Elisabeth Wilhelmine Machtholf. The economic depression that followed World War I in Germany prompted Doctor Hartmann to find work in China, and Erich spent his early childhood there. The family was forced to return to Germany in 1928, when the Chinese Civil War broke out. During World War II, Hartmann's younger brother, Alfred, also joined the Luftwaffe, serving as a gunner on a Junkers Ju 87 in North Africa. Alfred Hartmann was captured by the British and spent four years as a prisoner of war.

Hartmann was educated at the Volksschule in Weil im Schönbuch (April 1928 – April 1932), the Gymnasium in Böblingen (April 1932 – April 1936), the National Political Institutes of Education (Nazi Secondary Education School) in Rottweil (April 1936 – April 1937), and the Gymnasium in Korntal (April 1937 – April 1940), from which he received his Abitur. It was at Korntal that he met his wife-to-be, Ursula "Usch" Paetsch.

Hartmann's flying career began when he joined the glider training program of the fledgling Luftwaffe and was taught to fly by his mother, one of the first female glider pilots in Germany. The Hartmanns also owned a light aircraft but were forced to sell it in 1932 as the German economy collapsed. The rise to power of the Nazi Party in 1933 resulted in government support for gliding, and, in 1936, Elisabeth Hartmann established the glider club in Weil im Schönbuch for locals and served as instructor. The 14-year-old Hartmann became a gliding instructor in the Hitler Youth. In 1937, he gained his pilot's license, allowing him to fly powered aircraft.

Hartmann began his military training on 1 October 1940 at the 10th Flying Regiment in Neukuhren. On 1 March 1941, he progressed to the Luftkriegsschule 2 (Air War School 2) in Berlin-Gatow, making his first flight with an instructor four days later, followed in just under three weeks by his first solo flight. He completed his basic flying training in October 1941 and began advanced flight training at pre-fighter school 2 in Lachen-Speyerdorf on 1 November 1941. There, Hartmann learned combat techniques and gunnery skills. His advanced pilot training was completed on 31 January 1942, and, between 1 March 1942 and 20 August 1942, he learned to fly the Messerschmitt Bf 109 at the Jagdfliegerschule 2 (Fighter Pilot School 2).

Hartmann's time as a trainee pilot did not always go smoothly. On 31 March 1942, during a gunnery training flight, he ignored regulations and performed some aerobatics in his Bf 109 over the Zerbst airfield. His punishment was a week of confinement to quarters with the loss of two-thirds of his pay in fines. Hartmann later recalled that the incident saved his life:

That week confined to my room actually saved my life. I had been scheduled to go up on a gunnery flight the afternoon that I was confined. My roommate took the flight instead of me, in an aircraft I had been scheduled to fly. Shortly after he took off, while on his way to the gunnery range, he developed engine trouble and had to crash-land near the Hindenburg-Kattowitz railroad. He was killed in the crash.

Afterward, Hartmann practised diligently and adopted a new credo which he passed on to other young pilots: "Fly with your head, not with your muscles." During a gunnery practice session in June 1942, he hit a target drogue with 24 of the allotted 50 rounds of machine-gun fire, a feat that was considered difficult to achieve. His training had qualified him to fly 17 different types of powered aircraft, and, following his graduation, he was posted on 21 August 1942 to Ergänzungs-Jagdgruppe Ost (Supplementary Fighter Group, East) in Kraków, where he remained until 10 October 1942.

== World War II ==
In October 1942, Hartmann was assigned to fighter wing Jagdgeschwader 52 (JG 52—52nd Fighter Wing), based at Maykop on the Eastern Front in the Soviet Union. The wing was equipped with the Messerschmitt Bf 109G, but Hartmann and several other pilots were initially given the task of ferrying Junkers Ju 87 Stukas down to Mariupol. His first flight ended with brake failure, causing the Stuka to crash into and destroy the controller's hut. Hartmann was assigned to III. Gruppe of JG 52, (Note: For an explanation of Luftwaffe unit designations, see Organisation of the Luftwaffe during World War II.) led by Gruppenkommandeur (group commander) Major Hubertus von Bonin, and placed under the experienced Oberfeldwebel Edmund "Paule" Roßmann, although he also flew with such experienced pilots as Alfred Grislawski, Hans Dammers and Josef Zwernemann. After a few days of intensive mock combats and practice flights, Grislawski conceded that, although Hartmann had much to learn regarding combat tactics, he was a talented pilot.

Hartmann was placed as wingman to Paule Roßmann, who acted as his teacher, and one of the factors that enabled Hartmann's success. Grislawski also gave Hartmann pointers on where to aim. Hartmann eventually adopted the tactic "See – Decide – Attack – Break". The tactics were learned from Roßmann who had been injured in one arm and was not able to fly in physically demanding dogfights. Roßmann's solution was to "stand off", evaluate the situation, then select a target that was not taking evasive action and destroy it at close range.

=== Early aerial combat ===
On 19 September 1942, III. Gruppe had relocated to an airfield named Soldatskaja, located approximately halfway between Mozdok and Pyatigorsk. The Gruppe stayed at this airfield until 1 January 1943. During this period, the pilots occasionally also operated from airfields at Mozdok (15, 18, 19, 21, 22 and 23 October) and from Digora (5 to 17 November 1942), supporting Army Group A in the Battle of the Caucasus.

Hartmann flew his first combat mission on 14 October 1942 as Roßmann's wingman. When they encountered 10 enemy aircraft below, an impatient Hartmann opened full throttle and separated from Roßmann. He engaged an enemy fighter, but failed to score any hits and nearly collided with it. He then ran for cover in low cloud, and his mission subsequently ended with a crash landing after his aircraft ran out of fuel. Hartmann had violated almost every rule of air-to-air combat, and von Bonin sentenced him to three days of working with the ground crew. According to Günther Rall, who later became Hartmann's Gruppenkommandeur, Roßmann refused to fly with Hartmann again following this incident. Hartmann was then paired up with Grislawski as his wingman. Twenty-two days later, Hartmann claimed his first victory, an Ilyushin Il-2 Sturmovik of the 7th Guards Ground Attack Aviation Regiment, but by the end of 1942, he had added only one more victory to his tally. As with many high-claiming aces, it took him some time to establish himself as a consistently successful fighter pilot. On 5 November 1942, debris from an Il-2 damaged his Bf 109 G-2 engine resulting in a forced landing at Digora.

His Gruppe was moved to the combat area of the Kuban bridgehead on 1 April 1943 where it was based at an airfield at Taman. Operating from Taman until 2 July, III. Gruppe also flew missions from Kerch on 12 May, from Sarabuz and Saky on 14 May, Zürichtal, present-day Solote Pole, a village near the urban settlement Kirovske on 23 May, and Yevpatoria on 25/26 June. Hartmann's youthful appearance earned him the nickname "Bubi" (the hypocoristic form of "young boy" in the German language; roughly equivalent to "Kid"), and Walter Krupinski, to whom Hartmann was assigned as wingman, would constantly urge him: "Hey, Bubi, get in closer" or chastise him with "What was that, Bubi?" The danger of this method was evident on 25 May 1943 when he collided with a Soviet fighter instead of shooting it down. Nevertheless, Hartmann steadily improved. In Krupinski's absence, from the third week of May to the first week of August, Hartmann's number of claims rose from 17 to 60.

In preparation for Operation Citadel, III. Gruppe was relocated to the central sector of the eastern Front. The Gruppe first moved to Zaporizhzhia and then to Ugrim on 3 July. There, under the command of Luftflotte 4, they supported Army Group South fighting on the southern flank of the salient. On 5 July Hartmann claimed four victories during the large dogfights that took place during the Battle of Kursk. The day ended badly when Hartmann was unable to prevent Krupinski from being shot down and wounded over Ugrim airfield. Hartmann remarked; "the departure of Krupinski was a severe strike against the Staffel, and particularly against me." According to authors Prien, Stemmer, Rodeike and Bock, Krupinski was injured when his aircraft flipped on its back during landing in an attempt to evade other Bf 109s taking off. During Krupinski's convalescence, Hartmann served as temporary Staffelkapitän (squadron leader) of 7. Staffel until 12 August. Hartmann began to score successes regularly in a target rich environment. On 7 July, he for the first time became an "ace-in-a-day", claiming seven aerial victories that day, three Il-2 ground attack aircraft and four Lavochkin-Gorbunov-Gudkov (LaGG) fighters. This figure includes two Il-2s from the 1 ShAK regiment claimed shot down on an early morning mission.

On 8 July, he claimed four aerial victories and three the next day. On the former date, Hartmann claimed two aircraft on each mission he flew. In the first, Soviet records show at least one La-5 was lost. Major Tokarev of the 40 IAP (Fighter Aviation Regiment—Istrebitelny Aviatsionny Polk) was killed. In the afternoon, a two-man patrol with Rall resulted in two claims, and a third for Rall. A Soviet after-battle analysis mentioned this specific engagement;

"Eight Yak-1s in the Provorot region observed two Me 109s off their flight path. Paying no attention to the enemy aircraft our fighters continued. Seizing a convenient moment, the German fighters attacked our aircraft and shot down three Yak-1s."

At the start of August 1943, his tally stood at 42, but Hartmann's tally had more than doubled by the end. The Red Army began a counteroffensive in the region to contain the German operation and destroy its forces (Operation Kutuzov and Operation Polkovodets Rumyantsev). JG 52 was engaged in defensive operations throughout the month. On 1 August 1943, Hartmann again became an "ace-in-a day" by claiming five victories over LaGG fighters. Another four followed on 3 August and five on 4 August. On 5 August, III. Gruppe was ordered to an airfield named Kharkov-Rogan, 10 kilometers (6.2 miles) east of Kharkov where they fought against the Soviet Belgorod–Kharkov offensive operation. That day, he again claimed five aircraft destroyed, followed a single on 6 August, and a further five on 7 August. On 8 and 9 August he claimed another four Soviet fighters. Hartmann's last claim of the month came on the 20th, when he accounted for an IL-2 for his 90th victory. The next month, on 2 September, he was appointed Staffelkapitän of 9./JG 52. He replaced Leutnant Berthold Korts in this capacity who had been reported missing in action on 29 August.

In his first year of operational service, Hartmann felt a distinct lack of respect towards Soviet pilots. Most Soviet fighters did not even have effective gunsights and their pilots, some cases in the early weeks, were forced to draw one on the windscreen by hand: "In the early days, incredible as it may seem, there was no reason for you to feel fear if the Russian fighter was behind you. With their hand-painted gunsights they couldn't pull the lead properly (deflection shooting) or hit you." Hartmann also considered the Bell P-39 Airacobra, the Curtiss P-40 Warhawk, and the Hawker Hurricane to be inferior to the Focke-Wulf Fw 190 and Bf 109, although they did provide the Soviets with valuable gunsight technology.

Hartmann said the German pilots themselves still learned from their enemy. Oil freezing in the DB 605 engines of the Bf 109G-6s made them difficult to start in the extreme cold of the Russian winter. A captured Soviet airman showed them how pouring fuel into the aircraft's oil sump would thaw the oil and enable the engine to start on the first try. Another solution, also learned from the Soviets, was to ignite fuel under the engine.

=== Fighting techniques ===
In contrast to Hans-Joachim Marseille, who was a marksman and expert in the art of deflection shooting, Hartmann was a master of stalk-and-ambush tactics, preferring to ambush and fire at close range rather than dogfight.

When the decorated British test pilot Captain Eric Brown asked Hartmann how he had accomplished his total, Hartmann remarked, that along with firing at close range, inadequate Soviet defensive armament and manoeuvre tactics allowed him to claim a victim in every attack.

His preferred method of attack was to hold fire until extremely close (20 m (66 ft) or less), then unleash a short burst at point-blank range—a technique he learned while flying as wingman of his former commander, Walter Krupinski, who favoured this approach. This technique, as opposed to long-range shooting, allowed him to:

- Reveal his position only at the last possible moment
- Compensate for the low muzzle velocity of the slower-firing 30 mm MK 108 equipping some of the later Bf 109 models (though most of his victories were claimed with Messerschmitts equipped with the high-velocity 20 mm MG 151 cannon)
- Place his shots accurately with minimum waste of ammunition
- Prevent the adversary from taking evasive action

"The amazing thing about Erich Hartmann's achievements is that they are not based on a single exceptional talent. He is a very good flyer, certainly, but not a virtuoso like Hans-Joachim Marseille, who was killed after 158 aerial victories in North Africa and is regarded as an unrivaled marksman by his friends and foes. Hartmann is not an intelligent tactical innovator like Werner Mölders. It seems to me that he controls his flying talent, his good eyesight and his aggressiveness with an extremely cool mind as soon as he engages the enemy. He does not risk too much, but attacks his opponents from a superior position, mostly from behind, shoots from close range and immediately disengages."

— Günther Rall

Hartmann's guidance amplified the need to detect while remaining undetected. His approach was described by himself by the motto: "See–Decide–Attack–Reverse"; observe the enemy, decide how to proceed with the attack, make the attack, and then disengage to re-evaluate the situation. Hartmann's instinct was to select an easy target or withdraw and seek a more favourable situation. Once the attack was over, the rule was to vacate the area; survival was paramount. Another attack could be executed if the pilot could re-enter the combat zone with the advantage.

If attacked in-kind Hartmann flew straight and used the rudder [yaw] to point the Bf 109 in a slightly different direction to mislead the attacker in the amount of deflection needed. Hartmann then forced the column into the corner of the cockpit beginning the outside rotation of an oblique loop. It was an emergency measure if ambushed and it saved his life several times.

These tactics inflated Hartmann's successes over the summer of 1943. By 7 July he had claimed 21 Soviet aircraft destroyed and by 20 September he had claimed over 100.

=== Knight's Cross of the Iron Cross ===
The demands on fighter pilots increased after Kursk. In early August Hartmann flew 20 missions totalling 18 hours and 29 minutes in six days. By late August 1943, Hartmann had 90 aerial victories. On 20 August, in combat with Il-2s, his Bf 109 G-6 (Werknummer 20485—factory number) was damaged by debris, and he was forced to land behind Soviet lines at 06:20 in the vicinity of Artemivsk. Hartmann's Geschwaderkommodore, Dietrich Hrabak, had given orders to Hartmann's unit to support the dive bombers of Sturzkampfgeschwader 2, led by Hans-Ulrich Rudel in a counter-attack. The flight of eight German fighters engaged a mass of Soviet Yakovlev Yak-9 and Lavochkin La-5 fighter aircraft. Hartmann claimed two enemy aircraft before his fighter was hit by debris and he was forced to make an emergency landing.

In accordance with regulations, he attempted to recover the precision board clock. As he was doing so, Soviet soldiers approached. Realising that capture was unavoidable, he faked internal injuries. Hartmann's acting so convinced the Soviets that they put him on a stretcher and placed him on a truck. When Hartmann's Crew Chief, Heinz Mertens, heard what had happened, he took a rifle and went to search for Hartmann. Mertens was another important factor behind Hartmann's success, ensuring the aircraft was reliable. Hartmann subsequently escaped, and returned to his unit on 23 August. At least one source suggests the cause of the crash-landing was enemy fire. Lieutenant P. Yevdokimov, flying an IL-2, from the 232 ShAP, may have hit Hartmann. This period was very successful; during five days of August 1943, Hartmann claimed 24 Soviet aircraft in 20 missions.

Karaya-Staffel emblem

On 9 September, III. Gruppe moved to an airfield at Dnipropetrovsk, present-day Dnipro, where they stayed until 24 September. On 18 September, Hartmann downed two Yaks from the 812 IAP regiment for claims 92 and 93. On 20 September 1943, Hartmann was credited with his 100th aerial victory—he claimed four this day to end it on 101. He was the 54th Luftwaffe pilot to achieve the century mark. Nine days later, Hartmann downed the Soviet ace Major Vladimir Semenishin of the 104 GvIAP (Guards Fighter Aviation Regiment—Gvardeyskiy Istrebitelny Aviatsionny Polk) while protecting bombers from Kampfgeschwader 27 for his 112th victory.

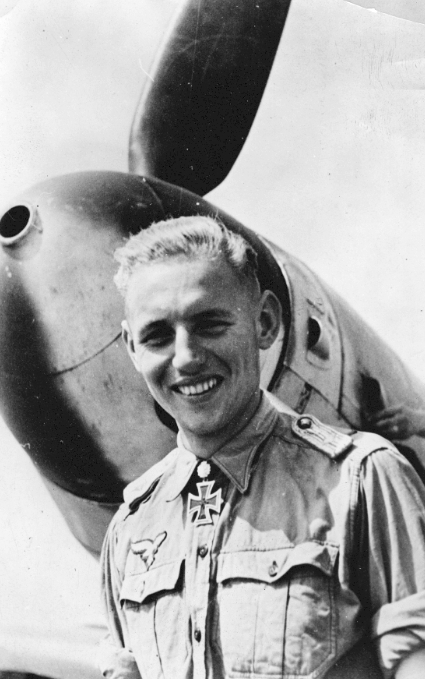
Erich Hartmann with his Bf 109 in October 1943

In October 1943, Hartmann claimed another 33 aerial victories. On 2 and 12 October he accounted for four victories and achieved a treble on 14, 15 and 20 October and double claims on 24, 25 and 29 October. On 29 October, he was awarded the Knight's Cross of the Iron Cross (Ritterkreuz des Eisernen Kreuzes), at which point his tally stood at 148. By the end of the year, this had risen to 159. The Gruppe reached an airfield near Apostolovo on 1 November. With the exception of a brief period from 12 to 20 November when they also used an airfield at Kirovohrad, the Gruppe remained here until 7 January 1944. Here on 14 November, his Bf 109 G-6 (Werknummer 20499) suffered engine failure resulting in a forced landing at Kirovohrad airfield.

On 10 January 1944, III. Gruppe moved to an airfield at Novokrasne located approximately 40 kilometers (25 miles) south-southwest of Novoukrainka. While based at Novokrasne, elements of the Gruppe also operated from Ivanhorod (11 to 13 January), at Velyka Lepetykha (3 to 22 February), and Mykolaiv (2 to 23 February). In the first two months of 1944, Hartmann claimed over 50 Soviet aircraft. On 22 February, he crashed another Bf 109 G-6 on a transfer flight to Uman. The successes included four on 17 January 1944 and on 26 February, a further 10 fighters were claimed shot down; all of them Soviet-flown P-39s to reach 202. His spectacular rate of success raised a few eyebrows even in the Luftwaffe High Command; his claims were double and triple-checked, and his performance closely monitored by an observer flying in his formation.

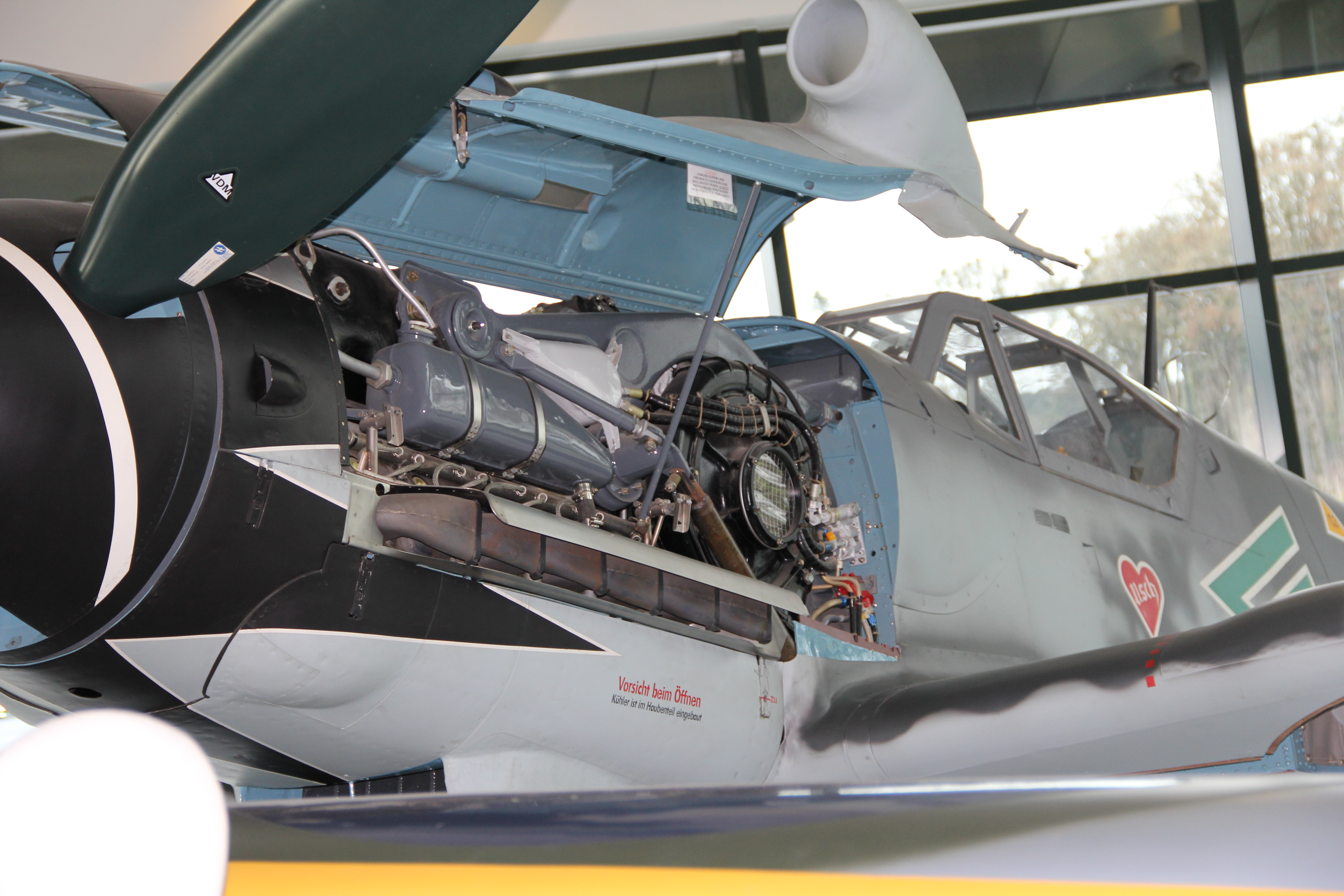
Bf 109 in the Hartmann color scheme on display at the Evergreen Aviation & Space Museum

By this time, the Soviet pilots were familiar with Hartmann's radio call sign of Karaya 1, and the Soviet Command had put a price of 10,000 rubles on the German pilot's head. Hartmann was nicknamed the Cherniy Chort ("Black Devil") because of his skill and paint scheme of his aircraft. This scheme was in the shape of a black tulip on the engine cowling; though this became synonymous with Hartmann in reality he flew with the insignia on only five or six occasions. Hartmann's opponents were often reluctant to stay and fight if they noticed his personal design. As a result, this aircraft was often allocated to novices, who could fly it in relative safety. On 21 March, it was Hartmann who claimed JG 52's 3,500th victory of the war. Adversely, the supposed reluctance of the Soviet airmen to fight caused Hartmann's kill rate to drop. Hartmann then had the tulip design removed, and his aircraft painted just like the rest of his unit. Consequently, in the following two months, Hartmann claimed over 50 victories.

In March 1944, Hartmann, Gerhard Barkhorn, Walter Krupinski and Johannes Wiese were summoned to Adolf Hitler's Berghof in Berchtesgaden. Barkhorn was to be honoured with the Swords, while Hartmann, Krupinski and Wiese were to receive the Knight's Cross of the Iron Cross with Oak Leaves (Ritterkreuz des Eisernen Kreuzes mit Eichenlaub). According to Hartmann, all four of them got drunk on cognac and champagne. On arrival at Berchtesgarden, Hartmann was reprimanded by Hitler's adjutant for intoxication and for handling Hitler's hat. Also present at the award ceremony on 4 April were Reinhard Seiler, Kurt Bühligen, Horst Ademeit, Hans-Joachim Jabs, Dr. Maximilian Otte, Bernhard Jope and Hansgeorg Bätcher from the bomber force, and the Flak officer Fritz Petersen, all destined to receive the Oak Leaves.

=== Diamonds to the Knight's Cross ===
In April and May 1944, 9./JG 52 resisted the Soviet Crimean Offensive. In April Hartmann claimed five victories. In May, Hartmann filed claims number 208 to 231 which included six on 6 May. On 8 May 1944, JG 52 fled the region as the German defence collapsed. JG 52 subsequently took part in the fighting on the Romanian border.

III. Gruppe relocated to Roman on 18 May. Three days later, Hartmann engaged United States Army Air Forces aircraft in Defense of the Reich for the first time flying in defence of the Ploiești oilfields and engaging North American P-51 Mustang fighters for the first time over Romania. On 24 June, the United States Army Air Forces' (USAAF) Fifteenth Air Force attacked various targets in Romania with 377 bombers. A fraction of this attack force, consisting of 135 Consolidated B-24 Liberator bombers and Lockheed P-38 Lightning and P-51 fighters, headed for the Ploiești oilfields. Defending against this attack, Hartmann claimed a P-51 shot down. Only one other claim against this type was made by Hartmann in 1945.

Later that month, P-51s ran his Messerschmitt out of fuel. During the intense manoeuvring, Hartmann ran out of ammunition. One of the P-51Bs flown by Lt. Robert J. Goebel of the 308th Squadron, 31st Fighter Group, broke away and headed straight for Hartmann while he hung in his parachute. Goebel was making a camera pass to record the bailout and banked away from him only at the last moment, waving at Hartmann as he went by.

On 15 August, III. Gruppe moved to Warzyn Pierwszy, Poland. The airfield was located approximately 15 kilometers (9.3 miles) west of Jędrzejów. Two days later, Hartmann became the top scoring fighter ace, surpassing fellow JG 52 pilot Gerhard Barkhorn, with his 274th victory. (Note: Sources regarding the exact number of P-51 Mustang victories are inconclusive and vary between seven and eight. Toliver and Constable give the impression that eight kills are probable, while other sources speak of seven victories.) On 23 August, Hartmann claimed eight victories in three combat missions, an "ace-in-a-day" achievement, bringing his score to 290 victories. He passed the 300-mark on 24 August 1944, a day on which he shot down 11 aircraft in two combat missions south of Radom-Lublin, representing his greatest ever victories-per-day ratio (a "double-ace-in-a-day") and bringing the number of aerial victories to an unprecedented 301. (Note: Bergström states that German pilots claimed 32 Soviet aircraft shot down near Sandomierz on 23 and 24 August. According to research by Dmitriy Khazanov, the 2nd Air Army lost no more than eleven aircraft those two days, two of which in aerial combat with German fighters.) Every aerial victory filed by a pilot of III. Gruppe on 23 and 24 August was claimed by Hartmann, earning him two named reference in the Wehrmachtbericht on 24 and 25 August respectively. The authors Prien, Stemmer, Balke and Bock speculate that the entire Gruppe may have flown fighter protection for Hartmann to make this achievement possible.

Hartmann became one of only 27 German soldiers in World War II to receive the Diamonds to his Knight's Cross. Hartmann was summoned to the Führerhauptquartier Wolfsschanze, (the "Wolf's Lair") Adolf Hitler's military headquarters near Rastenburg, to receive the coveted award from Hitler personally. Hartmann was asked to surrender his side arm – a security measure heightened by the aftermath of the failed assassination attempt on 20 July 1944. According to one account, Hartmann refused and threatened to decline the Diamonds if he were not trusted to carry his pistol. During Hartmann's meeting with Hitler, Hartmann discussed at length the shortcomings of fighter pilot training. Allegedly, Hitler admitted to Hartmann that he believed that, "militarily, the war is lost," and that he wished the Luftwaffe had "more like him and Rudel."

The Diamonds to the Knight's Cross also earned Hartmann a 10-day leave. On his way to his vacation, he was ordered by General der Jagdflieger Adolf Galland to attend a meeting in Berlin-Gatow. Galland wanted to transfer Hartmann to the Messerschmitt Me 262 test program but, at Hartmann's request, the transfer was cancelled on the grounds of his professed attachment to JG 52. Hartmann argued to Göring that he best served the war effort on the Eastern Front. On 10 September, Hartmann married his long-time teenage love, Ursula "Usch" Paetsch. Witnesses to the wedding included his friends Gerhard Barkhorn and Wilhelm Batz.

On 25 May, II. Gruppe was ordered to transfer one Staffel to the west in Defense of the Reich. Barkhorn, the commander of II. Gruppe, selected Leutnant Hans Waldmann's 4. Staffel which was officially assigned to the II. Gruppe of Jagdgeschwader 3 "Udet" (JG 3—3rd Fighter Wing). On 10 August, this squadron officially became the 8. Staffel of JG 3. In consequence, Hartmann was transferred on 30 September and tasked with creation and leadership of a new 4. Staffel of JG 52. Command of his former 9. Staffel was passed on to Leutnant Hans-Joachim Birkner. At the time, II. Gruppe was based in Nagyrábé, Hungary. Before flying further combat missions, Hartmann had to train the new inexperienced pilots. He led this squadron until 16 January 1945 when he was given command of I. Gruppe of JG 52, thus succeeding Major Barkhorn in this capacity. Hartmann transferred command of 4. Staffel to Leutnant Friedrich Haas.

=== Last combat missions ===
On 31 January 1945, Hartmann transferred command of II. Gruppe of JG 52 to Major Batz. From 1–14 February, he then briefly led I. Gruppe of Jagdgeschwader 53 (JG 53—53rd Fighter Wing) as acting Gruppenkommandeur until he was replaced by Hauptmann Helmut Lipfert, substituting for Major Jürgen Harder who had been transferred. At the time, the Gruppe was based in Veszprém and was fighting in the siege of Budapest. He claimed his only aerial victory with JG 53 on 4 February when he shot down a Yak-9 fighter. In March 1945, Hartmann, his score now standing at 337 aerial victories, was asked a second time by General Adolf Galland to join the Me 262 units forming to fly the new jet fighter.

Hartmann attended the jet conversion program led by Heinrich Bär. Galland also intended Hartmann to fly with Jagdverband 44. Hartmann declined the offer, preferring to remain with JG 52. Some sources report that Hartmann's decision to stay with his unit was due to a request via telegram made by Oberstleutnant Hermann Graf.

On 1 February, Hartmann was appointed Gruppenkommandeur of I. Gruppe of JG 52, succeeding Hauptmann Adolf Borchers. On 5 April, the Gruppe moved to an makeshift airfield at Raudnitz, present-day Roudnice nad Labem. Here, Hartmann claimed his 350th aerial victory on 17 April, in the vicinity of Chrudim. The last wartime photograph of Hartmann known was taken in connection with this victory. Two days later, I. Gruppe moved to an airfield located approximately 4 kilometres (2.5 miles) southwest of Deutsch-Brod, now Havlíčkův Brod. Hartmann's last aerial victory occurred over Brno, Czechoslovakia, on 8 May, the last day of the war in Europe. Early that morning, he was ordered to fly a reconnaissance mission and report the position of Soviet forces. Hartmann took off with his wingman at 08:30 and spotted the first Soviet units just 40 kilometres (25 miles) away. Passing over the area, Hartmann saw a Yak-9, ambushed it from his vantage point at 12,000 ft (3,700 m) and shot it down.

When he landed, Hartmann learned that the Soviet forces were within artillery range of the airfield, so JG 52 destroyed Karaya One, 24 other Bf 109s, and large quantities of ammunition. Hartmann and Hermann Graf were ordered to fly to the British sector to avoid capture by Soviet forces while the remainder of JG 52 was ordered to surrender to the approaching Soviets. As Gruppenkommandeur of I. Gruppe, Hartmann chose to surrender his unit to members of the US 90th Infantry Division.

== Prisoner of war ==
After his capture, the U.S. Army handed Hartmann, his pilots, and ground crew over to the Soviet Union on 14 May, where he was imprisoned in accordance with the Yalta Agreements, which stated that airmen and soldiers fighting Soviet forces had to surrender directly to them. Hartmann and his unit were led by the Americans to a large open-air compound to await the transfer.

In Hartmann's account, the Soviets attempted to convince him to cooperate with them. He was asked to spy on fellow officers, but refused and was given ten days' solitary confinement in a four-by-nine-by-six-foot (1.2 m × 2.7 m × 1.8 m) chamber. He slept on a concrete floor and was given only bread and water. On another occasion, according to Hartmann, the Soviets threatened to kidnap and murder his wife (the death of his son was kept from Hartmann). During similar interrogations about the Me 262, Hartmann was struck by a Soviet officer using a cane, prompting Hartmann to hit the assailant with a chair, knocking him out. Expecting to be shot, he was transferred back to the small bunker.

Hartmann, not ashamed of his war service, opted to go on a hunger strike and starve rather than fold to "Soviet will", as he called it. The Soviets allowed the hunger strike to go on for four days before force-feeding him. More subtle efforts by the Soviet authorities to convert Hartmann to communism also failed. He was offered a post in the East German Air Force, which he refused:

If, after I am home in the West, you make me a normal contract offer, a business deal such as people sign every day all over the world, and I like your offer, then I will come back and work with you in accordance with the contract. But if you try to put me to work under coercion of any kind, then I will resist to my dying gasp.

=== War crimes charges ===
During captivity, Hartmann was first arrested on 24 December 1949, and three days later, sentenced to 20 years in prison. The sentence was carried out by the Ministry of Internal Affairs in the Ivanovo district. The preliminary criminal investigation was carried out only formally. He was condemned for atrocities against Soviet citizens, the attack on military objects and destruction of Soviet aircraft and therefore significant damage to the Soviet economy. Hartmann protested multiple times against this judgment. In June 1951, he was charged for a second time as an alleged member of an anti-Soviet group. The second trial was carried out under military authority in the military district of Rostov-on-Don. Hartmann was charged with war crimes, specifically the "deliberate shooting of 780 Soviet civilians" in the village of Briansk, attacking a bread factory on 23 May 1943, and destroying 345 "expensive" Soviet aircraft. He refused to confess to these charges and conducted his own defence, which was, according to Hartmann, denounced by the presiding judge as a "waste of time".

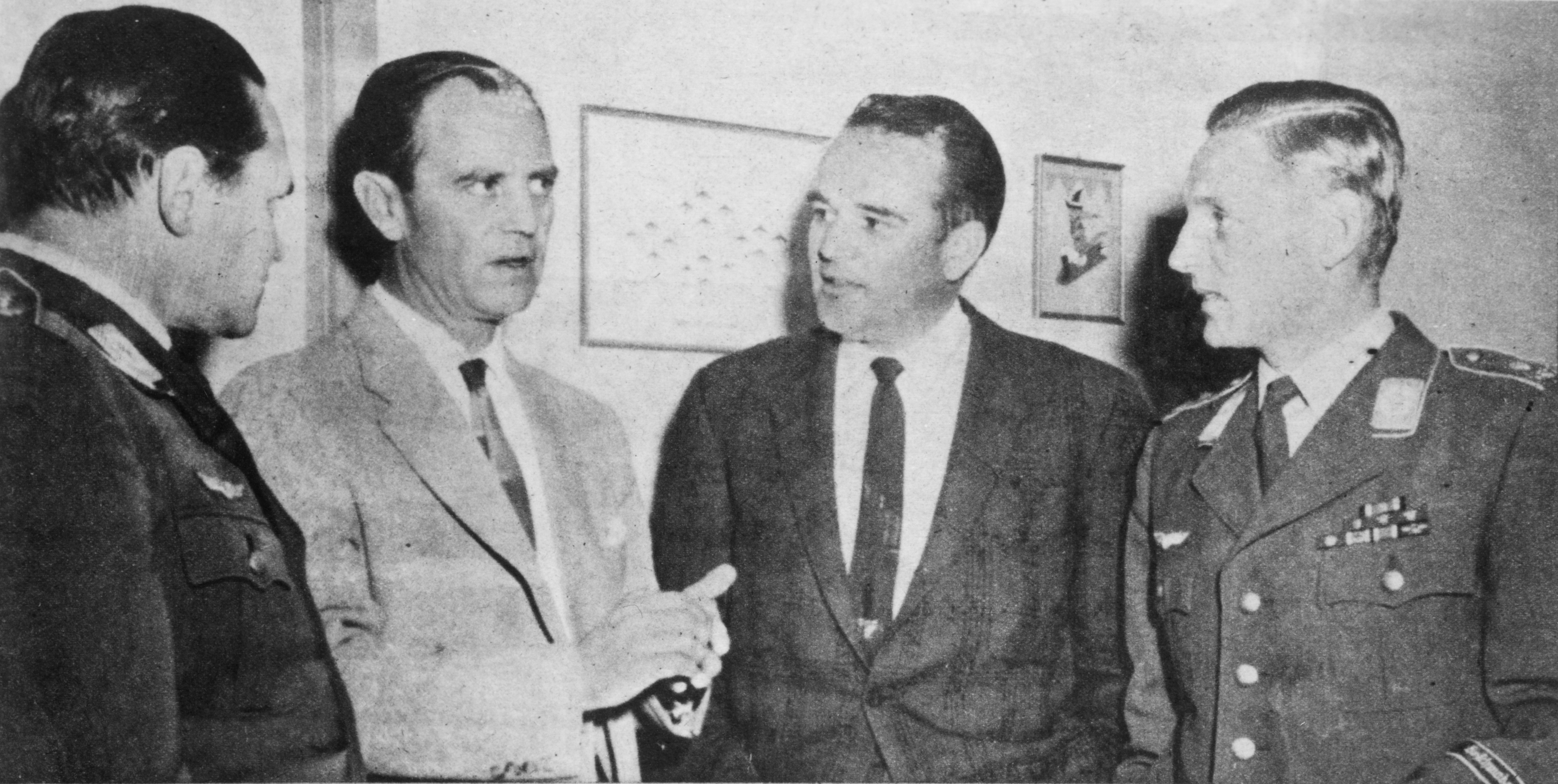
Hartmann (right) and German flying ace Walter Krupinski (left) meeting American flying aces Hubert Zemke (second from left) and Bud Mahurin (1963)

Sentenced to 25 years of hard labour, Hartmann refused to work, and was put into solitary confinement, which led to a riot by some of his fellow detainees, who overpowered the guards and temporarily freed him. He made a complaint to the Kommandant's office, asking for a representative from Moscow and an international inspection, as well as a new trial hearing to overturn his sentence. This was refused, and he was transferred to a camp in Novocherkassk, where he spent five more months in solitary confinement. He was later put before a new tribunal, which upheld the original sentence. He was subsequently sent to another camp, this time at Diaterka in the Ural Mountains. In late 1955, Hartmann was released as a part of the last Heimkehrer.

In January 1997, over three years after his death, Hartmann's case was reviewed by the Chief Military Prosecutor in Moscow, Russia, after the dissolution of the Soviet Union, and he was acquitted of all historical charges against him in Russian law. The government agency stated that he had been wrongly convicted.

== Post-war years ==
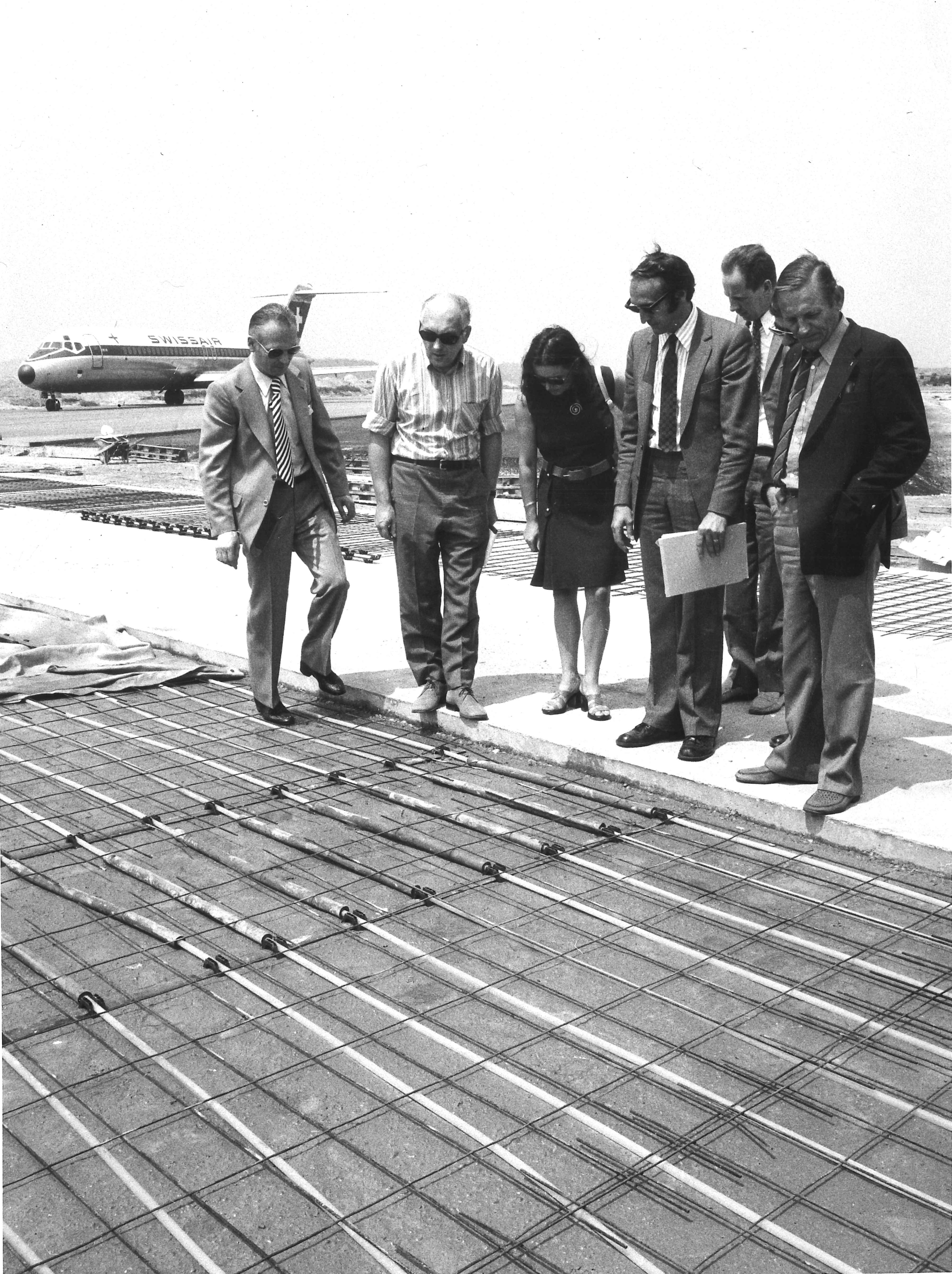
Hartmann (right), in 1972 as a consultant during construction at Zurich Airport.

During his long imprisonment, Hartmann's son, Erich-Peter, was born in 1945 and died as a three-year-old in 1948, without his father ever having seen him. Hartmann later had a daughter, Ursula Isabel, born on 23 February 1957. When Hartmann returned to West Germany, he reentered military service in the Bundeswehr and became an officer in the West German Luftwaffe, where he commanded West Germany's first all-jet unit from 6 June 1959 to 29 May 1962, Jagdgeschwader 71 "Richthofen". This unit was initially equipped with Canadair Sabres and later with Lockheed F-104 Starfighters.

Hartmann also made several trips to the United States, where he trained on U.S. Air Force equipment. In 1957, he began training with American instructors. He and other German pilots were trained at Luke Air Force Base in Arizona. The Republic F-84 Thunderjet fighter course lasted 60 days and consisted of 33 hours of flight time in the Lockheed T-33 and 47 hours in the Republic F-84F Thunderstreak. The former Luftwaffe pilots needed only familiarisation training.

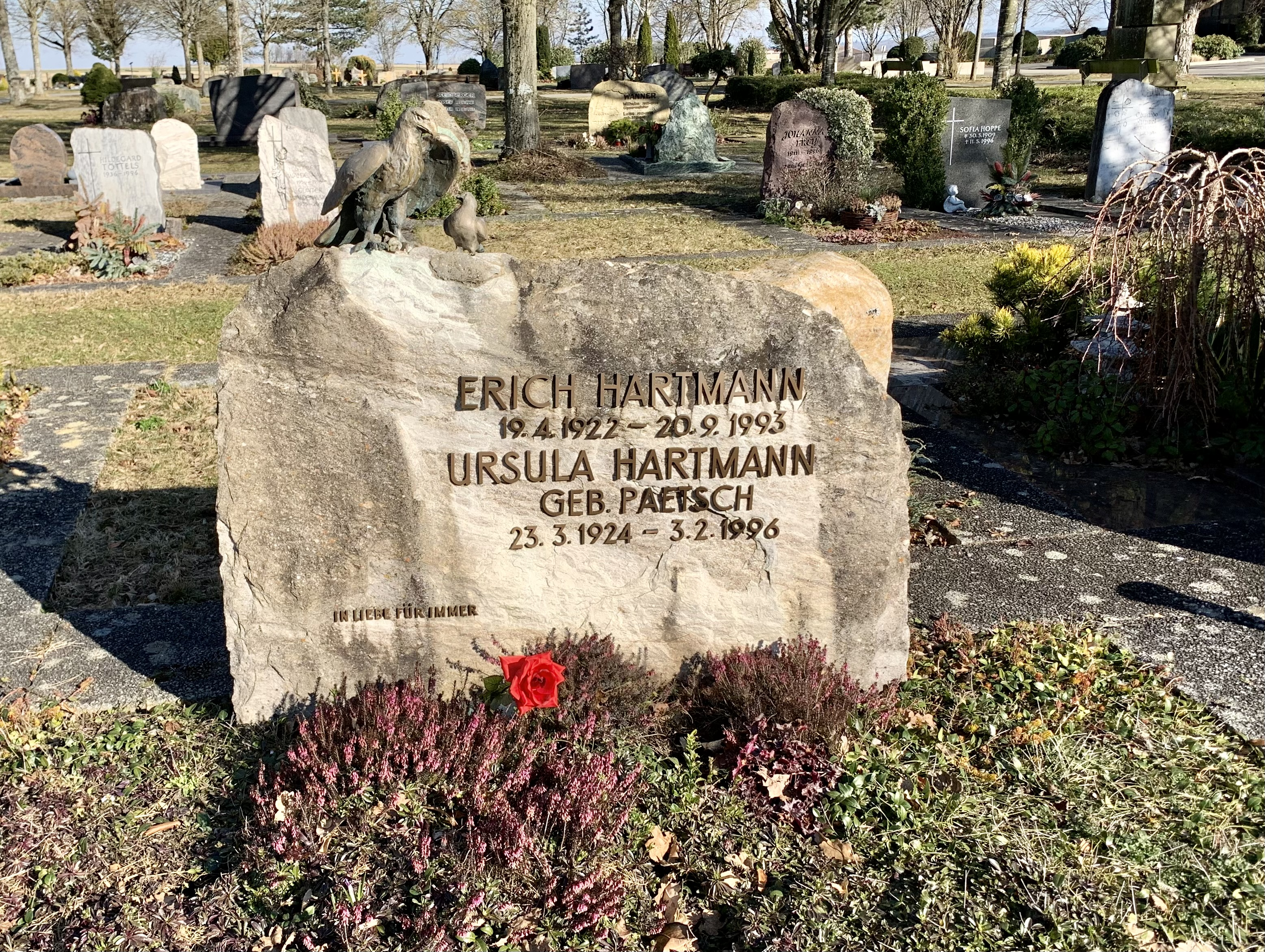
Grave in Weil im Schönbuch

Hartmann considered the F-104 a fundamentally flawed and unsafe aircraft and strongly opposed its adoption by the Luftwaffe. Already in 1957, he had recommended to Kammhuber to first buy and evaluate a few new and unfamiliar aircraft before committing the air force to a new aircraft type. Although events subsequently validated his low opinion of the aircraft (269 crashes and 116 German pilots killed on the F-104 in non-combat missions, along with allegations of bribes culminating in the Lockheed scandal), his outspoken criticism proved unpopular with his superiors, and he was forced into early retirement in 1970. From 1971 to 1974, he worked as a flight instructor in Hangelar, near Bonn, and also flew in fly-ins with other wartime pilots.

Hartmann died on 20 September 1993, at the age of 71 in Weil im Schönbuch. In 2016, Hartmann's former air force unit, JG 71, honoured him by applying his tulip colour scheme to their aircraft.

== In popular culture ==
Hartmann was the subject of a biography by the American authors Trevor J. Constable and Raymond F. Toliver, under the title The Blond Knight of Germany. Originally released in the United States in 1970, it was published in Germany the next year, as Holt Hartmann vom Himmel! ("Shoot Hartmann down!" alternatively "Get Hartmann from the Sky").

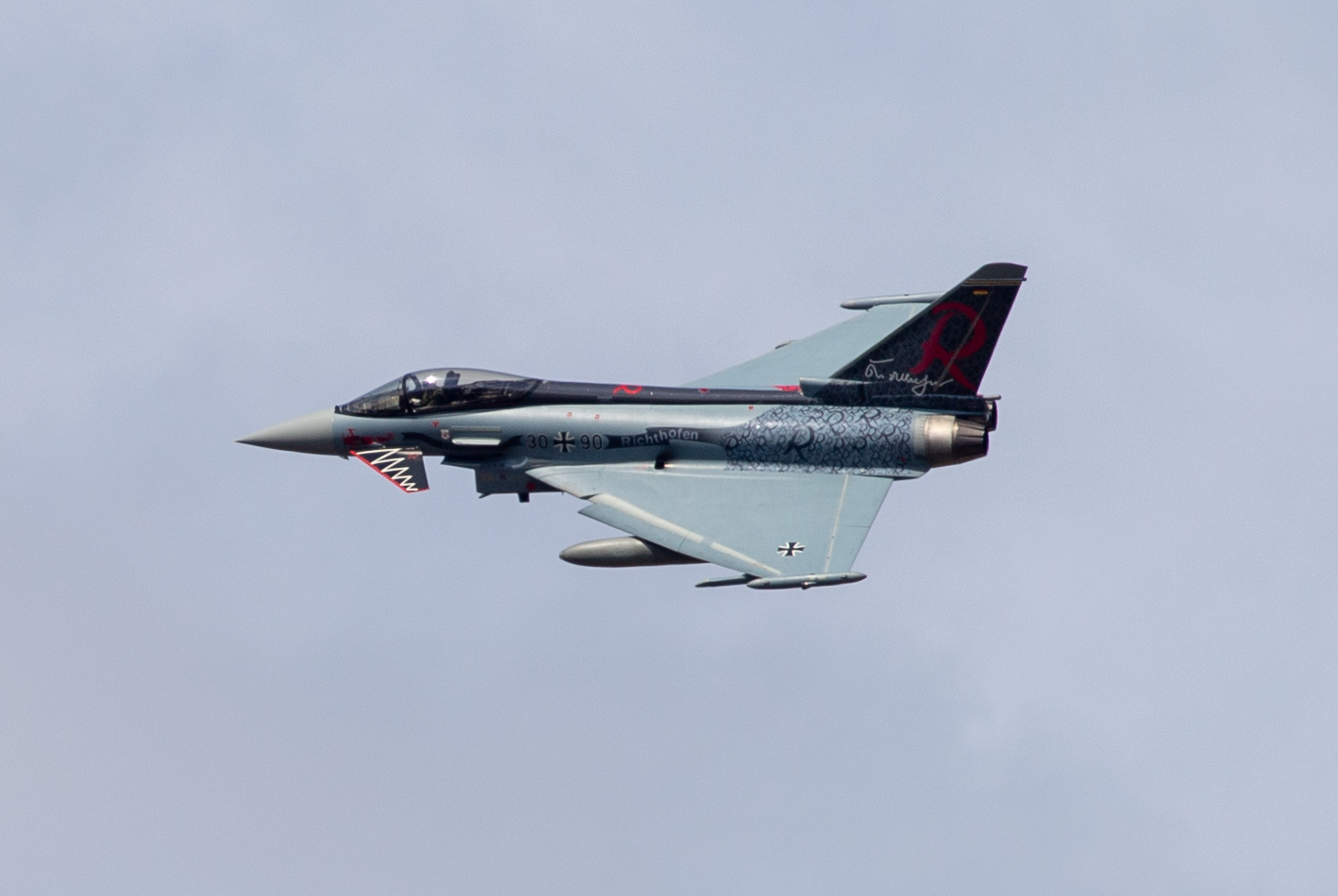
The Hartmann "black tulip" color scheme applied to the forewing of a German Air Force Eurofighter Typhoon

The Blond Knight was a commercial success and enjoyed a wide readership among both the American and the German public. The book has been criticised by some as ahistorical and misleading in recent American and German historiography. Ronald Smelser and Edward J. Davies, in their work The Myth of the Eastern Front, describe it as one of the key works that promoted the Myth of the clean Wehrmacht.

Historian Jens Wehner notes that the German-language version of the book was immensely popular in Germany, as well as in Great Britain and the United States, but contained serious flaws in its presentation of historical realities. These included uncritical borrowing from the Nazi propaganda elements of the Fliegerasse ("aces") and stereotypes about the Soviet Union. According to Wehner, the latter could be traced to prevailing attitudes during the Cold War. Furthermore, the political and social consequences of World War II were completely ignored. Wehner points out, the Cold War to some extent legitimized the German war on the Eastern Front. This legitimization was supported in the writings of Constable and Toliver and thankfully accepted by the Bundeswehr leadership, many of which had served in the Wehrmacht of Nazi Germany. Particularly the West German student movement of the late 1960s had begun questioning the roles and responsibilities of the Bundeswehr leadership in Nazi Germany.

== Summary of career ==
=== Aerial victory claims ===
According to US historian David T. Zabecki, Hartmann was credited with 352 aerial victories. Spick also lists Hartmann with 352 aerial victories claimed in 1,425 combat missions, all of which on the Eastern Front, and a mission-to-claim ratio of 4.05. Mathews and Foreman, authors of Luftwaffe Aces – Biographies and Victory Claims, researched the German Federal Archives and found records for 352 aerial victory claims, plus two further unconfirmed claims. This number includes two claims over United States Army Air Forces flown P-51 Mustangs, and 350 Soviet Air Forces piloted aircraft on the Eastern Front.

Owing to the loss of Erich Hartmann's second logbook, the original biographers Trevor Constable and Raymond Toliver compiled Hartmann's late-war claims from questionable sources. The Luftwaffe microfilm claims listings were not yet consulted resulting in a very unreliable late-war claims listing. As one example, the biographers Constable and Toliver state that Hartmann claimed a Soviet La-5 fighter on 21 November 1944. Research has shown that Hartmann's unit did not even fly this day due to very poor weather conditions, moreover the Soviet 5th Air Army did not lose any aircraft. According to the authors Daniel and Gabor Horvath, comparison to Soviet enemy loss reports showed that the number of aircraft destroyed by Hartmann may actually be much lower than the 352 he claimed, regardless of enemy nationality.

=== Decorations ===
- Front Flying Clasp of the Luftwaffe in Gold with Pennant "1300"
- Pilot/Observer Badge in Gold with Diamonds (25 August 1944)
- Eastern Front Medal
- Iron Cross (1939)
  - 2nd Class (17 December 1942)
  - 1st Class (7 March 1943)
- Honour Goblet of the Luftwaffe on 13 September 1943 as Leutnant and pilot
- German Cross in Gold on 17 October 1943 as Leutnant in the III./Jagdgeschwader 52
- Knight's Cross of the Iron Cross with Oak Leaves, Swords and Diamonds
  - Knight's Cross on 29 October 1943 as Leutnant and pilot in the 9./Jagdgeschwader 52 (Note: According to Scherzer as pilot in the pilot in the 7./Jagdgeschwader 52.)
  - 420th Oak Leaves on 2 March 1944 as Leutnant and Staffelführer of the 9./Jagdgeschwader 52
  - 75th Swords on 2 July 1944 as Oberleutnant and Staffelkapitän of the 9./Jagdgeschwader 52
  - 18th Diamonds on 25 August 1944 as Oberleutnant and Staffelkapitän of the 9./Jagdgeschwader 52

Hartmann had kept the whereabouts of his Knight's Cross of the Iron Cross secret from his captors during his time as a prisoner of war, claiming that he had thrown it away. The hiding place was in a small stream. His comrade Hans "Assi" Hahn managed to hide the Knight's Cross in a double bottom cigar box and smuggled it back to Germany when he was released from captivity.

=== Dates of rank ===
Hartmann joined the military service in Wehrmacht on 1 October 1940. His first station was Neukuhren in East Prussia, where he received his military basic training as a Luftwaffe recruit.

Luftwaffe (Wehrmacht)

- 1 April 1942: Leutnant (second lieutenant)
- 1 May 1944: Oberleutnant (first lieutenant)
- 1 September 1944: Hauptmann (captain)
- 8 May 1945: Major (major) (Note: His promotion to Major on 8 May 1945 is unconfirmed. Hartmann himself, in a document dated 16 May 1945, used the rank Hauptmann.)

Luftwaffe (Bundeswehr)

- 12 December 1960: Oberstleutnant (lieutenant colonel)
- 26 July 1967: Oberst (colonel)

== Notes ==
Military offices
Preceded by none	Commander of Jagdgeschwader 71 Richthofen; 19 January 1959 – 29 May 1962	Succeeded by Oberst Günther Josten
