= Wittmundhafen Air Base =

Military airfield in Germany

- Fliegerhorst Wittmundhafen
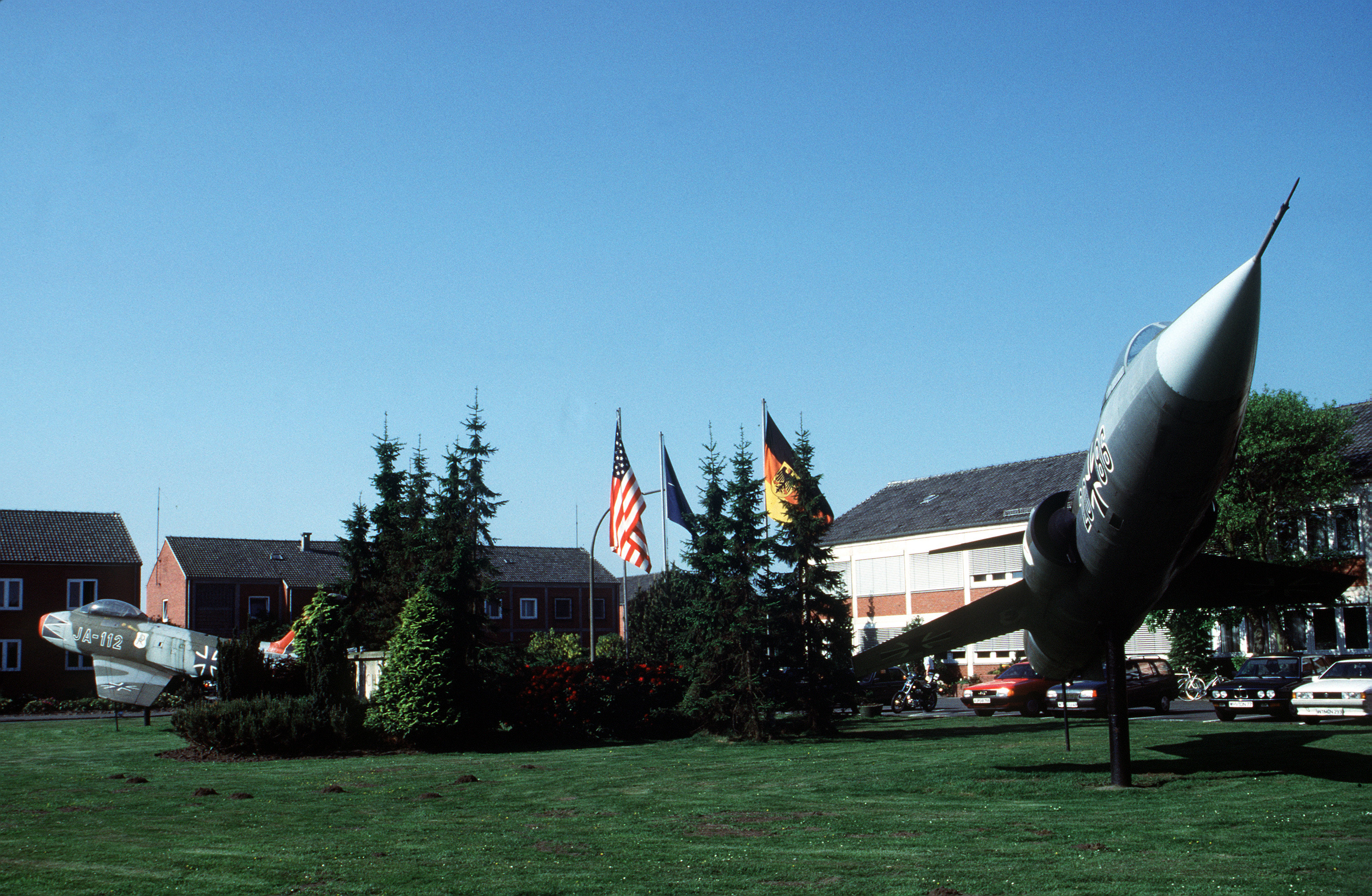
- F-86 and F-104 gate guardians, 1989

Site information
- Operator: German Air Force

Location
- Location in Germany
- Coordinates: 53°32′52″N 007°40′02″E

Garrison information
- Occupants: Taktisches Luftwaffengeschwader 71

Airfield information
- Identifiers: ICAO: ETNT
- Elevation: 26 feet (8 m) AMSL
Runways
Direction	Length and surface
08/26	8,005 feet (2,440 m) Asphalt
- Sources: DoD FLIP

Wittmundhafen Air Base (German: Fliegerhorst Wittmundhafen, ICAO: ETNT) is a military air base in Germany. It is home to Tactical Air Force Wing 71 (Taktisches Luftwaffengeschwader 71) of the German Air Force (Luftwaffe). Since May 1974 the F-4F Phantom II was operated from the base. German F-4F Phantoms at the base were retired on 29 June 2013. During 2013, the squadron transitioned to the Eurofighter Typhoon. Prior to May 1974, the base was home to the F-104G Starfighter. Up to the mid/late-1980s the wing operated a handful (usually 4) of Dornier Do 28D. The base currently stores all former F-4F Phantoms of the German Air Force.
