= Günther Josten =

German World War II fighter pilot and wing commander in German Air Force

- Josten as an Oberleutnant
- Born: 7 November 1921; Rhynern in Hamm
- Died: 7 July 2004 (aged 82); Aurich
- Military career
- Allegiance: Nazi Germany (to 1945); West Germany
- Branch: Luftwaffe; German Air Force
- Service years: 1940–1945; 1956–1981
- Rank: Oberleutnant (Wehrmacht); Oberst (Bundeswehr)
- Units: EJGr Ost, JG 51 JG 73, JG 71; Allied Air Forces Central Europe
- Commands: 3./JG 51, IV./JG 51, JG 71
- Conflicts: World War II Eastern Front
- Awards: Knight's Cross of the Iron Cross with Oak Leaves
- Other work: Joiner, wood industry

Günther Josten (7 November 1921 – 7 July 2004) was a German Luftwaffe military aviator during World War II, a fighter ace credited with 178 enemy aircraft shot down in 420 combat missions, all of which claimed over the Eastern Front. Following World War II, he served in the newly established West Germany's Air Force in the Bundeswehr.

Josten volunteered for military service in the Luftwaffe of Nazi Germany following outbreak of World War II. He was admitted in 1940 and following flight training, he was posted to the 1st group of Jagdgeschwader 51 "Mölders" (JG 51—51st Fighter Wing) operating on the Eastern Front. He claimed his first aerial victory in February 1943 and after 84 aerial victories, he was awarded the Knight's Cross of the Iron Cross in February 1944. In July 1944, he was appointed squadron leader of the 3. Staffel (3rd squadron) of JG 51 and on 20 July, Josten claimed his 100th victory in aerial combat. After he claimed his 161st aerial victory he was awarded the Knight's Cross of the Iron Cross with Oak Leaves on 28 March 1945. On 12 April 1945, he was appointed group commander of the 4th group of JG 51.

On 5 May 1945, Josten was interned by the British occupational authorities. Following his release, he worked in private industry. Following the rearmament of the Federal Republic of Germany, Josten joined the Air Force of the Bundeswehr in 1956. In 1962, he was appointed wing commander of Jagdgeschwader 71 "Richthofen" (JG 71—71st Fighter Wing). From 1967 to 1970, he was made deputy commander of NATO's System Operations Center in Brockzetel, in Aurich. In October 1970, he was transferred to the Allied Air Forces Central Europe at the Ramstein Air Base. There he led the staff of the aerial defenses. His last service position before he retired in 1981 was deputy commander of the 4th Air Division. Josten, who logged 3,250 flight hours, 1,580 of which were during World War II, died in 2004.

== Early life and career ==
Josten was born on 7 November 1921 in Rhynern, today a borough of Hamm, in the Province of Westphalia during the time of the Weimar Republic. He was the second son, following his older brother Reinhard, of Johannes Josten and his wife Gertraud. (Note: Reinhard, born in 1918, served in Jagdgeschwader 51 and attained the rank of Oberleutnant before he was killed in a flight accident returning from a mission on 21 April 1942. He was credited with six aerial victories, plus one unconfirmed clam.) His father was the Protestant pastor of Kölleda in Thuringia. In October 1935, the Reichsluftfahrtministerium (Ministry of Aviation) decided to build an airfield at Kölleda which influenced him and his brother to become an aviator. Josten attended the boarding school Schulpforta. The school was made into a National Political Institutes of Education (Nationalpolitische Erziehungsanstalt—Napola), a secondary school founded under the recently established Nazi state, on 16 August 1935. The goal of the Napola schools was to raise a new generation for the political, military and administrative leadership of the Third Reich. On 25 May 1938, Josten made his first rubber powered flight on a DFS 35 glider aircraft with the National Socialist Flyers Corps of Naumburg.

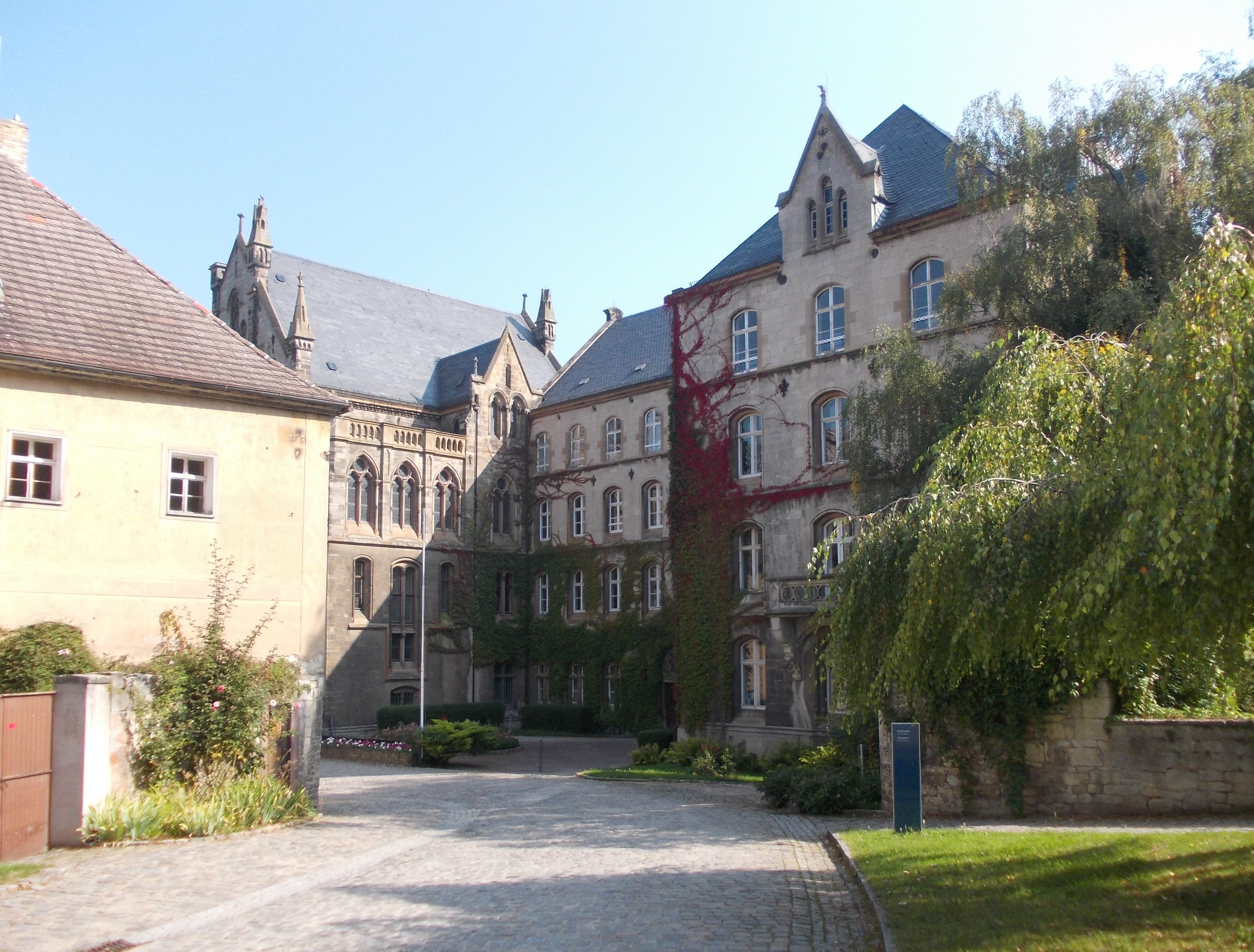
Schulpforta main building, 2014

World War II in Europe began on Friday, 1 September 1939, when German forces invaded Poland. Following the start of hostilities, Josten immediately volunteered for military service in the Luftwaffe. The Wehrmacht took its time to accept and process his application. In January 1940, he was ordered to the Fliegerausbildungsstelle (Aviator Training Facility) in Weimar-Nohra and on 11 April, he was posted to Fliegerausbildungs-Regiment 61 (61st Aviators Training Regiment) in Oschatz. At first he feared to become an air gunner but his desire to become a pilot was granted and he was posted to the Luftwaffen-Flugzeugführerschule A/B 4 (flight school for the pilot license) at Prague-Gbell. (Note: Flight training in the Luftwaffe progressed through the levels A1, A2 and B1, B2, referred to as A/B flight training. A training included theoretical and practical training in aerobatics, navigation, long-distance flights and dead-stick landings. The B courses included high-altitude flights, instrument flights, night landings and training to handle the aircraft in difficult situations. For pilots destined to fly multi-engine aircraft, the training was completed with the Luftwaffe Advanced Pilot's Certificate (Erweiterter Luftwaffen-Flugzeugführerschein), also known as the C-Certificate.) On 31 August 1940, he was granted leave to return to Schulpforta for his Abitur (diploma) examination which began 19 September. He received news that he had passed his Abitur, a precondition to become an officer, on 23 September and returned to Prague on 2 October. On 18 October 1940, after 63 takeoffs and landings, Josten made his first solo flight on a Focke-Wulf Fw 44 "Stieglitz". On 31 July 1941, Josten received his A/B pilot license and was promoted to Unteroffizier (staff sergeant), the only student of his class to receive this promotion. During flight training, he was trained to fly the Focke-Wulf Fw 44, Fw 56 and Fw 58, the Bücker Bü 131, the Klemm Kl 35, the Junkers W 34, the Gotha Go 145, the Arado Ar 65 and Ar 96, the Heinkel He 70, the Letov Š-328, the Avia B-534, and the North American NA-57.

On 1 August 1941, Josten was transferred to the Jagdfliegervorschule 1 (Pre Fighter Pilot School) in Kamenz under the command of Hauptmann (Captain) Hans-Günther von Kornatzki. He was then transferred to the Jagdgruppe Drontheim, based at the Fliegerhorst Grove in Denmark on 1 November 1941. There, on 9 January 1942, he flew the Messerschmitt Bf 109 fighter aircraft for the first time. On 7 July 1942, he was posted to the Ergänzungs-Jagdgruppe Ost (EJGr Ost—Supplementary Fighter Group, East), a specialized training unit for new fighter pilots destined for the Eastern Front.

== World War II ==
At the end of August 1942, Josten was sent to the Eastern Front and assigned to the 1. Staffel (1st squadron) of Jagdgeschwader 51 "Mölders" (JG 51—51st Fighter Wing), named after the first fighter pilot to claim 100 aerial victories in combat, Oberst (Colonel) Werner Mölders. (Note: For an explanation of Luftwaffe unit designations see Organization of the Luftwaffe during World War II.) On 23 February 1943, he claimed his first aerial victory, an Ilyushin Il-2 ground-attack aircraft shot down on a combat air patrol near Zhizdra. On 9 March 1943, Josten's Staffel was equipped with the Focke-Wulf Fw 190 A-4 at the airbase Schatalowka, present-day Shatalovo air base, 40 kilometers (25 miles) southeast of Smolensk. On 3 April 1943, Josten received the Iron Cross 2nd Class (Eisernes Kreuz zweiter Klasse) from his commanding officer. The official documented presentation date for this award was 4 April.

On 15 April 1943, Josten was granted home leave. During this vacation, he visited Dresden where he met with Alice Schmidt, née Wehrsen, for the first time. She was 21 years old, a young war widow, mother of a two-year-old son, Jürgen, and former friend of his brother Reinhard. The two fell in love and married on 13 June 1944.

On 10 July 1943 he scored multiple times for his claims 8 to 10. Three days later on 13 July he shot down 5 Ilyushin Il-2 Sturmovik ground attack aircraft for victories 12 to 16. All in all he claimed 19 victories in July and 30 in August. After a successful September with 26 victories he was transferred to the Luftkriegsschule 4 at Fürstenfeldbruck. He returned to his Staffel on 3 February 1944. Two days later he claimed two Bostons and was awarded the Knight's Cross of the Iron Cross (Ritterkreuz des Eisernen Kreuzes) as Oberfeldwebel. He was also promoted to Leutnant (second lieutenant) on account of this achievement, backdated to 1 January 1944. He claimed his 90th victory on 2 May 1944. On 18 September 1944, he was given command of 3. Staffel of JG 51 as Staffelkapitän (squadron leader), succeeding Oberleutnant Walther Weaver who had been wounded in combat on 10 July. On 20 July 1944, Josten was credited with his 100th aerial victory. He was the 85th Luftwaffe pilot to achieve the century mark.

On 18 September 1944, three bombardment groups of the United States Army Air Forces (USAAF) flew to Warsaw on a daylight support mission during the Warsaw Uprising (1 August – 2 October 1944). The force was made up of Boeing B-17 Flying Fortress bombers from 95th, 100th and 390th Bombardment Group, all from the 13th Bombardment Wing, escorted by 73 long range North American P-51 Mustang fighter aircraft. From this bomber force, Josten was credited with the destruction of the B-17 "Til we meet again", piloted by Lieutenant Francis Akins. The attack killed all but two members of the crew, who managed to bail out, including Akins.

By 26 October his score had reached 139 claims. His 150th kill was claimed on 17 February 1945. (Note: According to Bergström, Josten claimed his 150th aerial victory on 16 February 1945. Mathews and Foreman date this event on 17 February 1945.) Following his 161st victory, Josten was awarded the Knight's Cross of the Iron Cross with Oak Leaves (Ritterkreuz des Eisernen Kreuzes mit Eichenlaub) on 28 March 1945, the 810th member of the Wehrmacht to be so honored. Josten never received an official presentation of the Oak Leaves themselves nor did he receive the award documentation. Josten was first informed of the fact that he had been so honored by the commanding general of Luftwaffenkommando Ostpreußen (Airforce Command East Prussia), Generalmajor (Major General) Klaus Uebe, on 2 April 1945. On 4 April 1945, Reichsmarschall (Marshal of the Reich) Hermann Göring, the Commander-in-Chief of the Oberkommando der Luftwaffe (Air Force High Command), sent Josten a telegram and congratulated him for his achievements and the presentation of the Oak Leaves.

=== Group commander ===
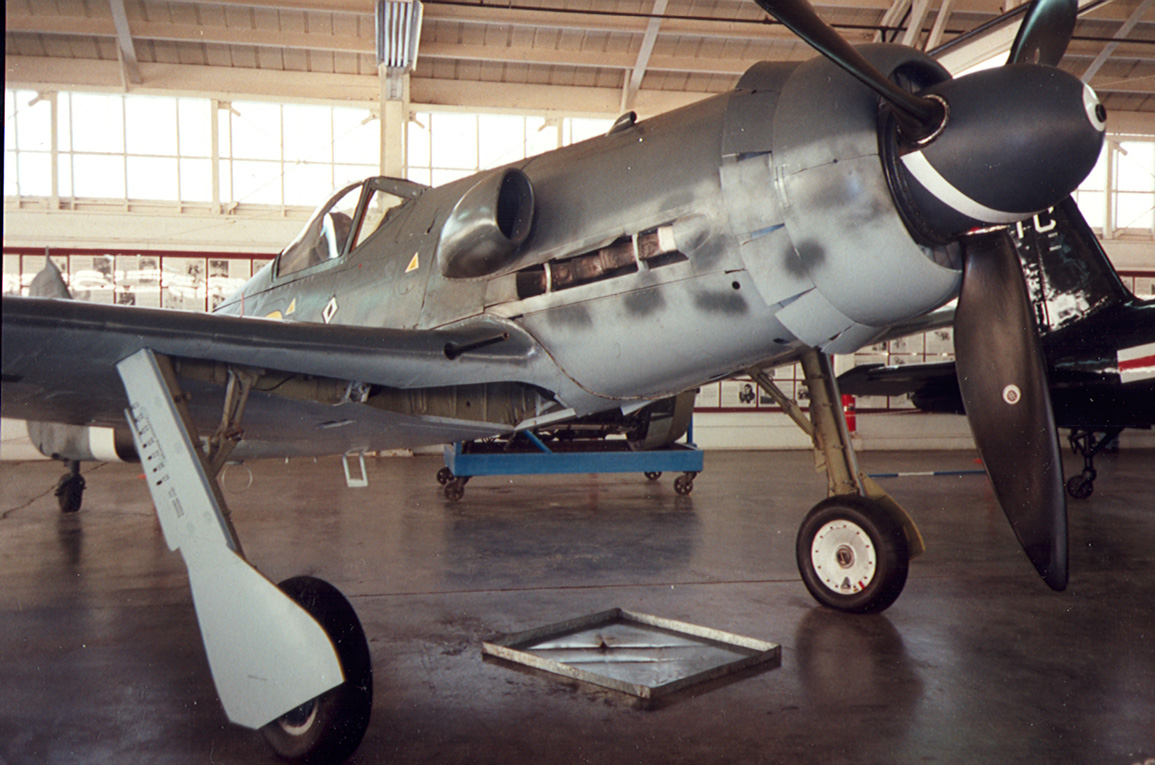
Fw 190 D-13/R11, Champlin Fighter Museum, Phoenix, Arizona (c.1995)

Josten was appointed Gruppenkommandeur (group commander) of IV. Gruppe of JG 51 on 12 April 1945, succeeding Major Heinz Lange. That day, Hauptmann (Captain) Günther Schack, the Gruppenkomandeur of I. Gruppe, was seriously injured in combat. In consequence, Josten briefly took charge of I. Gruppe, delaying his command of VI. Gruppe until 18 April. On 22 April, IV. Gruppe was moved to an airfield at Schmoldow. That day, just prior to the relocation Josten claimed two Il-2 shot down south of Stettin. On 23 April, the commanding general of Luftwaffenkommando Nordost (Air Force Command North East), General der Flieger (General of the Aviators) Martin Fiebig, visited the unit at Schmoldow. Fiebig held a speech, demanding that every German soldier should fight to the end and asked for volunteers to make Kamikaze suicide attacks against the Soviet Oder crossings. The idea was to fly Junkers Ju 88 bombers, loaded with high explosives, into the Oder bridges, none of the pilots from VI. Gruppe volunteered for these missions.

Flying the Focke-Wulf Fw 190 D-9 on 25 April 1945, Josten claimed nine aerial victories, his most successful day as a fighter pilot. On the first mission, leading a flight of three, he was credited with the destruction of one Yak-3 and three Il-2. On the second mission, he and his wingman, Oberfeldwebel Alfred Rauch, together shot down nine aircraft, five by Josten and four by Rauch. On this mission they first encountered 50 Bostons and 30 Airacobra. From this force, Josten shot down one Airacobra and two Bostons. The two then ran into a flight of 20 Il-2 and 30 Yak-3, of which Josten claimed two Il-2 destroyed. Josten claimed his last and 178th aerial victory over a Yak-3 on 26 April 1945. On 6 May 1945, he was taken prisoner by British forces of the RAF Second Tactical Air Force in Flensburg. Legally, according to the international law, Josten and his comrades were not prisoners of war but were interned.

Shortly after the end of the war the British wanted to evaluate the performance of the German Fw 190 D-13/R11 (Werknummer 836017—factory number) which had been assigned to the Geschwaderkommodore of Jagdgeschwader 26, Major Franz Götz. At Flensburg, the British Disarmament Wing wanted to compare the fighter's performance against a Hawker Tempest. On 25 June 1945, Josten and Heinz Lange flew the Fw 190 D-13 in mock combat against a Tempest piloted by a British pilot. The mock dogfight was conducted at an altitude of 10,000 feet (3,000 meters) with only enough fuel for the flight and no ammunition. The machines proved evenly matched.

== Later life and service ==
Josten was released as a prisoner of war on 31 October 1945 by the No. 2 Squadron RAF at the Kiel-Holtenau airfield. He then became a joiner and worked at a furniture factory. In May 1949, he was hired by the Holzindustriebedarf GmbH, an industrial wood supplies company, in Cologne. After six months, he was put in charge of technical and commercial operations. End of 1950, he was offered a general manager position with a plywood supplier in Koblenz and changed jobs to this company on 1 April 1951. His wife Alice gave birth to their mutual son, Meinhard Gero, on 2 July 1946. He and Alice were divorced on 15 November 1955. Later that year, he was invited to a New Year party in Stolberg (Harz), then in East Germany, by his former school friend Hans Tetzner, Chief Physician of the local hospital. At the party he met Ursula, a pediatrician from Erfurt. The two later married and had two sons, born in 1959 and 1961.

On 4 April 1956, Josten rejoined the military service in the German Air Force, at the time referred to as the Bundesluftwaffe, in the Bundeswehr. He attended a number of training courses with the 7351st and 7330th Flying Training Wing of the United States Air Force (USAF) and the Canadian 427 Special Operations Aviation Squadron and was promoted to Hauptmann on 22 November 1956. He then served with the Waffenschule 10 (10th Weapon School) in Oldenburg and later as a Staffelkapitän in Jagdgeschwader 73 (JG 73—73rd Fighter Wing). During these assignments, he was promoted to Major (major) on 6 March 1959.

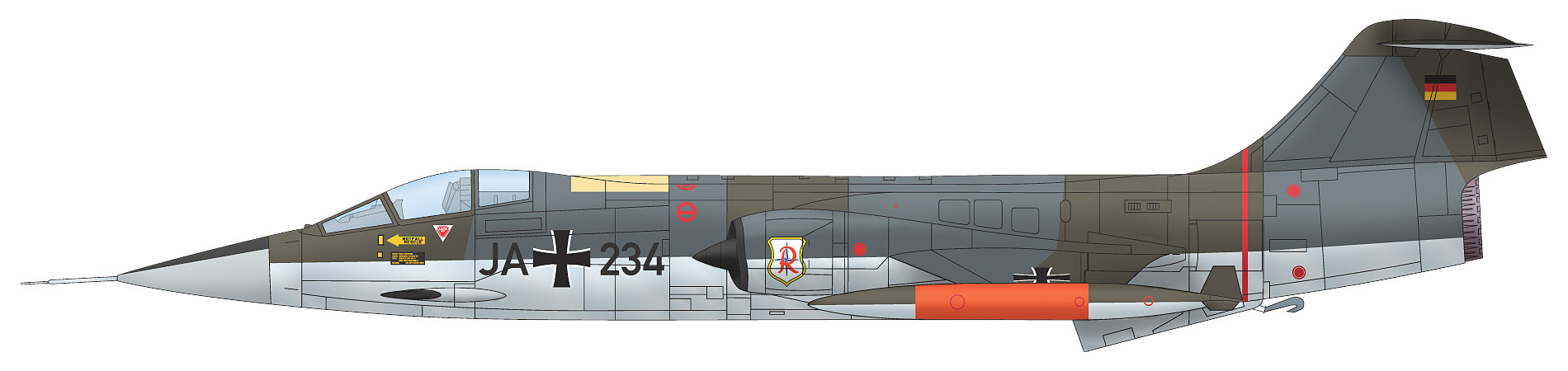
F-104 of JG 71

On 30 May 1962, Josten succeeded Erich Hartmann as Geschwaderkommodore (wing commander) of Jagdgeschwader 71 "Richthofen" (JG 71—71st Fighter Wing), named after the World War I fighter ace Manfred von Richthofen. It was under his command that JG 71 reequipped the Canadair Sabre with the U.S.-made Lockheed F-104 Starfighter. There, he was promoted to Oberstleutnant (lieutenant colonel) on 3 June 1962 and to Oberst on 14 June 1965. Josten was interviewed by the Christian Democratic Union (CDU) politician Carl Damm during the investigation of the Starfighter-Affäre (Starfighter Crisis), the high loss rate of Bundesluftwaffe operated F-104 Starfighters.

On 1 April 1967, Josten was made deputy commander of NATO's System Operations Center in Brockzetel, in Aurich. On 1 October 1970, he was transferred to the Allied Air Forces Central Europe at the Ramstein Air Base. There he led the staff of the aerial defenses. His last service position before he retired in 1981 was deputy commander of the 4. Luftwaffendivision (4th Air Division). Josten, who had retired from active service on 31 March 1981, was a member of the Gemeinschaft der Jagdflieger (Association of German Armed Forces Airmen). He died on 7 July 2004 in Aurich, Lower Saxony.

== Summary of career ==
=== Aerial victory claims ===
According to US historian David T. Zabecki, Josten was credited with 178 aerial victories. Spick also lists Josten with 178 aerial victories claimed in 420 combat missions, all of which were on the Eastern Front, and a mission-to-claim ratio of 2.36. He further claimed 25 unconfirmed victories and was never shot down in combat.

Mathews and Foreman, authors of Luftwaffe Aces – Biographies and Victory Claims, researched the German Federal Archives and found records for 178 aerial victory claims, plus 13 further unconfirmed claims. This number includes one claim over a United States Army Air Forces flown B-17 Flying Fortress, and 177 Soviet Air Forces piloted aircraft on the Eastern Front.

Victory claims were logged to a map-reference (PQ = Planquadrat), for example "PQ 44793". The Luftwaffe grid map (Jägermeldenetz) covered all of Europe, western Russia and North Africa and was composed of rectangles measuring 15 minutes of latitude by 30 minutes of longitude, an area of about 360 square miles (930 km^{2}). These sectors were then subdivided into 36 smaller units to give a location area 3 km × 4 km (1.9 mi × 2.5 mi) in size.

Chronicle of aerial victories
This and the ♠ (Ace of spades) indicates those aerial victories which made Josten an "ace-in-a-day", a term which designates a fighter pilot who has shot down five or more airplanes in a single day. This and the – (dash) indicates unwitnessed aerial victory claims for which Josten did not receive credit. This and the ? (question mark) indicates information discrepancies listed by Braatz, Göpel, Prien, Stemmer, Rodeike, Balke, Bock, Mathews and Foreman.
Claim	Date	Time	Type	Location	Claim	Date	Time	Type	Location
– 1. Staffel of Jagdgeschwader 51 –
1	23 February 1943	06:34	Il-2	PQ 35 Ost 54144, Zhizdra; 25 km (16 mi) northeast of Zhizdra	50	30 August 1943	17:30	La-5	southwest of Nikitino
2	22 March 1943	08:10	Il-2	PQ 35 Ost 63372, Kromy; 25 km (16 mi) southwest of Glazunovka	51	31 August 1943	15:28	Pe-2	northeast of Beresovka
—	28 May 1943	~11:20	La-5	east of Oryol	52	31 August 1943	15:29	Pe-2	west of Straina
3	8 June 1943	19:13	Il-2	PQ 35 Ost 54863, 10 km (6.2 mi) northwest of Sloboda; 20 km (12 mi) north-northwest of Oryol	53	31 August 1943	18:00	Il-2 m.H. (Note: The "m.H." refers to an Ilyushin Il-2 with rear gunner (mit Heckschütze).)	northwest of Yelnya
4	10 June 1943	19:16	Il-2	PQ 35 Ost 44593, north of airfield Bryansk; 10 km (6.2 mi) northeast of Bryansk	— (Note: This claim is listed by Braatz and Göpel, but not by Mathews and Foreman.)	—	—	unknown	unknown
5	10 June 1943	19:21	Il-2	PQ 35 Ost 44484, airfield Bryansk; 25 km (16 mi) east-southeast of Dyatkovo	—	—	—	Pe-2?	unknown
6	10 June 1943	19:25	Il-2	PQ 35 Ost 44462, airfield Bryansk; 15 km (9.3 mi) east-southeast of Zhizdra	—	—	—	Pe-2?	unknown
7	10 July 1943	07:24	MiG-3	PQ 35 Ost 63577, vicinity of Fatezh; 20 km (12 mi) south-southeast of Trosna	—	—	—	Pe-2?	unknown
8	10 July 1943	11:25	Il-2	PQ 35 Ost 63587, railway Oryol; 20 km (12 mi) southwest of Maloarkhangelsk	—	—	—	unknown	unknown
9	10 July 1943	11:30	Pe-2	PQ 35 Ost 53664, railway Oryol; 10 km (6.2 mi) southwest of Trosna	54	4 September 1943	10:14	Il-2 m.H.	east of Ssowkino (Tsowkino)
10	12 July 1943	05:46	Il-2	PQ 35 Ost 63233, west of Novosil; 20 km (12 mi) east of Zalegoshch	55	4 September 1943	10:16	Il-2 m.H.	vicinity of Ssadki (Tsadi)
11♠	13 July 1943	07:00	Il-2	PQ 35 Ost 64881 south of Mtsensk, 15 km (9.3 mi) northeast of Zalegoshch	56	4 September 1943	17:13	Pe-2	south of Leonovo
12♠	13 July 1943	07:03	Il-2	PQ 35 Ost 64886, south of Mtsensk; 15 km (9.3 mi) northeast of Zalegoshch	57	4 September 1943	17:14	Pe-2	north of Kazanka River
13♠	13 July 1943	13:45	Il-2 m.H.	PQ 35 Ost 63244, vicinity of Novosil; 10 km (6.2 mi) south of Zalegoshch	58	5 September 1943	15:21	MiG-3	Bereskino
14♠	13 July 1943	13:50	Il-2 m.H.	PQ 35 Ost 63219, vicinity of Novosil vicinity of Zalegoshch	59♠	7 September 1943	08:28	Yak-7	vicinity of Ssamnilovo
15♠	13 July 1943	14:05	Il-2 m.H.	PQ 35 Ost 63244, vicinity of Novosil; 10 km (6.2 mi) south of Zalegoshch	60♠	7 September 1943	11:28	Il-2 m.H.	vicinity of Buda
—	13 July 1943	~14:00	Il-2	vicinity of Oryol	61♠	7 September 1943	11:30	Yak-1	PQ 35 Ost 44135
16	17 July 1943	10:42	Il-2	PQ 35 Ost 63532, railway Oryol vicinity of Maloarkhangelsk	62♠	7 September 1943	11:33	Il-2 m.H.	west of Kosmalschewa
17	19 July 1943	11:32	Yak-7	PQ 35 Ost 64845; Kursk salient, 20 km (12 mi) south of Mtsensk	63♠	7 September 1943	16:10	Il-2 m.H.	north of Baganova
18	22 July 1943	18:20	Il-2 m.H.	PQ 35 Ost 64749, airfield Sloboda; 20 km (12 mi) north of Oryol	64♠	7 September 1943	16:10	Il-2 m.H.	railway station Filipovo
19	25 July 1943	12:34	Il-2 m.H.	PQ 35 Ost 53612, 15 km (9.3 mi) southeast of Oryol; 25 km (16 mi) west of Trosna	65♠	7 September 1943	16:11	Il-2 m.H.	east of Mokroye
20	25 July 1943	12:50	Il-2 m.H.	PQ 35 Ost 53422, 1 km (0.62 mi) north of Kromy; 5 km (3.1 mi) west of Kromy	66	10 September 1943	16:43	Yak-1	east of Golyshevka
21	25 July 1943	12:58	Il-2 m.H.	PQ 35 Ost 53423, north of Kromy	67	10 September 1943	16:44	Yak-1	west of Kujowa (Kupava)
22	28 July 1943	10:30	Il-2 m.H.	PQ 35 Ost 54649, southwest of Bolkhov	68	10 September 1943	16:50	Yak-1	southwest of Woilowo (Vorlovo)
23	28 July 1943	10:33	Il-2 m.H.	PQ 35 Ost 54681, southwest of Bolkhov	69	10 September 1943	17:10	Il-2 m.H.	south of Ljudinovo
24	31 July 1943	08:58	Il-2	PQ 35 Ost 54679, northwest of Shidkoje vicinity of Oryol	70	15 September 1943? (Note: According to Mathews and Foreman, Josten's 70 aerial victory was claimed at 16:30 on 14 September 1943 over a Lavochkin La-5 in the vicinity of Schatalowka.)	08:55?	P-39?	1 km (0.62 mi) east of Bodki?
25	31 July 1943	09:03	LaGG-3	PQ 35 Ost 54676 vicinity of Oryol	71♠	15 September 1943	09:45	Pe-2	Brykino; Brykovo
26	2 August 1943	08:42	La-5	southeast of Kromy	72♠	15 September 1943	09:53	Il-2	Pjolki; Plotki
27	2 August 1943	08:45	Il-2 m.H.	southwest of Kromy	73♠	15 September 1943	09:56	Il-2 m.H.	Chaitsowo; Chantsovo
—	2 August 1943	—	La-5	vicinity of Kromy	74♠	15 September 1943	12:05	La-5	Nowje Ryki; Norje-Byki
— (Note: This claim is listed by Braatz and Göpel, and by Mathews and Foreman, but not by Prien, Stemmer, Rodeike and Bock.)	2 August 1943	—	La-5	vicinity of Kromy	75♠	15 September 1943	12:50	La-5	southwest of Frechowo; Tishevo
28	2 August 1943	09:35	Il-2 m.H.	south-southwest of Kromy	76♠	15 September 1943	13:10	Il-2 m.H.	Sharipino
29	3 August 1943	15:16	Il-2 m.H.	PQ 35 Ost 53414	77♠	15 September 1943	13:12	Il-2	Iljatrowka; Galinska
30	3 August 1943	15:20	La-5	PQ 35 Ost 53445	78♠	15 September 1943	13:15	Yak-9	Bolschaja; Bolynskaia
31	5 August 1943	04:37	Pe-2	PQ 35 Ost 55176, Karachev	79	17 September 1943	10:50	Pe-2	Kamezy; Rusinezky
32	7 August 1943	05:32	P-39	PQ 35 Ost 53227	80	17 September 1943	11:20	Yak-9	5 km (3.1 mi) southwest of Yelnya
33	7 August 1943	08:17	MiG-3	PQ 35 Ost 54843	81	17 September 1943	13:50	La-5	Suk; Jselo
34	13 August 1943	05:50	La-5	northwest of Boromlja vicinity of Okhtyrka	82	20 September 1943	16:30	La-5	1 km (0.62 mi) south of Shigalowo
35	13 August 1943	18:30	Hurricane	northeast of Olschany	83	5 February 1944	09:00	Boston	PQ 25 Ost N/93362, vicinity of Paryčy
36	13 August 1943	18:37	Hurricane	northeast of Olschany	84	5 February 1944	09:02	Boston	PQ 25 Ost N/93366, vicinity of Paryčy
37	14 August 1943	06:00	Il-2 m.H.	PQ 35 Ost 51847 vicinity Kharkiv-Poltawa	85	26 March 1944	12:40	Pe-2	PQ 35 Ost N/04556; 15 km (9.3 mi) south of Stara Bychow
38	14 August 1943	06:26	Il-2 m.H.	south of Krysino; PQ 51847, east of Krysino	86	26 March 1944	12:50	Pe-2	PQ 35 Ost N/04725; 20 km (12 mi) north-northeast of Rogatschew
39	14 August 1943	18:17	Il-2 m.H.	northeast of Merefa	87	5 April 1944	09:25	Yak-7	PQ 25 Ost N/42918; 10 km (6.2 mi) west of Kovel
40	14 August 1943	18:20	Il-2 m.H.	north of Podolychov	88	5 April 1944	09:35	Yak-7	PQ 25 Ost N/42689; 10 km (6.2 mi) north of Kovel
41	19 August 1943	15:48	MiG-3	PQ 35 Ost 41696, east of Okhtyrka	89	27 April 1944	11:23	MiG-3	PQ 25 Ost N/42885; 20 km (12 mi) south of Kovel
42	21 August 1943	14:19	Il-2	west-northwest of Kharkiv; PQ 61777, northwest of Kharkiv	90	30 April 1944	14:00	La-5	PQ 25 Ost N/42872; 20 km (12 mi) south-southwest of Kovel
43	21 August 1943	14:38	Il-2 m.H.	PQ 35 Ost 61777, west of Kharkiv	91	22 June 1944	10:25	Pe-2	PQ 35 Ost N/15587
44	21 August 1943	14:38	Il-2 m.H.	west of Kharkiv	92	23 June 1944	06:10	Yak-9	PQ 35 Ost N/051993, Orsha; 30 km (19 mi) southwest of Liozna
45	21 August 1943	14:40	Il-2	north of Liubotyn	93	23 June 1944	06:40	Yak-9	PQ 35 Ost N/05695, forced landing in the vicinity of Gorki
46	23 August 1943	06:45	MiG-3	east of Olschany	94	25 June 1944	17:10	Yak-9	PQ 25 Ost N/05389; 10 km (6.2 mi) west of Orsha
47	23 August 1943	12:45	LaGG-3	east of Ichalowka (Italovka)	95	25 June 1944	17:34	Yak-9	PQ 35 Ost N/05442; 15 km (9.3 mi) northeast of Orsha
48	23 August 1943	16:40	Pe-2	northeast of Bezliudivka	96	26 June 1944	11:47	P-39	PQ 25 Ost N/96467; 20 km (12 mi) north of Gorodok
49	23 August 1943	16:43	Pe-2	south of Losjevo	97	14 July 1944	11:20	Yak-9	PQ 25 Ost N/44846; 20 km (12 mi) southeast of Bryansk
—	23 August 1943	afternoon	MiG-3	vicinity of Kharkiv					
– 3. Staffel of Jagdgeschwader 51 –
98	19 July 1944	15:20	Il-2 m.H.	PQ 25 Ost N/32691; 40 km (25 mi) northeast of Chełm	133	20 October 1944	12:37	Il-2 m.H.	PQ 25 Ost N/25399 vicinity of Trakehnen
99	19 July 1944	15:40	Il-2 m.H.	PQ 25 Ost N/42744; 25 km (16 mi) west-southwest of Lubomi	134	20 October 1944	12:40	Il-2 m.H.	PQ 25 Ost N/25474; 10 km (6.2 mi) northeast of Trakehnen
100	20 July 1944? (Note: Braatz and Göpel on page 225 quote Josten's diary and state that the 100th aerial victory was claimed on 20 July 1944. However, on page 319, they contradict this statement by claiming the 100th aerial victory occurred on 19 July 1944.)	14:40	Il-2 m.H.	PQ 25 Ost N/31827; 10 km (6.2 mi) east of Rava-Ruska	135	20 October 1944	12:43	Il-2 m.H.	PQ 25 Ost N/25532; 10 km (6.2 mi) south of Trakehnen
101	12 August 1944	13:02	P-39	PQ 25 Ost N/12337; 25 km (16 mi) southwest of Garwolin	136	22 October 1944	13:40	Pe-2	PQ 25397 vicinity of Trakehnen
102	16 August 1944	08:50	Il-2 m.H.	PQ 25 Ost N/24792, southeast of Łomża; 25 km (16 mi) southeast of Łomża	137	25 October 1944	14:55	Yak-9	PQ 13328; 25 km (16 mi) northeast of Nasielsk
103	16 August 1944	08:55	Il-2 m.H.	PQ 25 Ost N/24796, southeast of Łomża; 25 km (16 mi) southeast of Łomża	138	26 October 1944	10:53	Yak-9	PQ 03633; 15 km (9.3 mi) east of Modlin
104	18 August 1944	16:32	Yak-9	PQ 13543; 15 km (9.3 mi) north of Warsaw	139	26 October 1944	11:03	Yak-9	PQ 13377; 20 km (12 mi) east-southeast of Nasielsk
105	20 August 1944	12:40	Il-2	PQ 13561, 25 km (16 mi) northeast of Warsaw	140	16 January 1945	—	Il-2	southeast of Liepāja vicinity of Warsaw
106	20 August 1944	13:10	Yak-9	PQ 13529, 25 km (16 mi) northeast of Warsaw	141	16 January 1945	—	Yak-9	southeast of Liepāja
107	20 August 1944	16:25	Yak-9	PQ 13562, 25 km (16 mi) northeast of Warsaw	142	17 January 1945	—	P-39	southwest of Ciechanów
108	21 August 1944	13:22	Yak-7	PQ 13395; 40 km (25 mi) northeast of Warsaw	143	11 February 1945	afternoon	La-5	southeast of Mamonovo
109	22 August 1944	08:30	Yak-7	PQ 23125; 25 km (16 mi) northeast of Ostrov	—	11 February 1945	afternoon	Il-2	southeast of Mamonovo
110	22 August 1944	08:35	Yak-7	PQ 23127; 25 km (16 mi) northeast of Ostrov	144	11 February 1945	afternoon	Il-2	southeast of Mamonovo
111	24 August 1944	12:20	La-5	20 km (12 mi) west of Ostrov	145♠	16 February 1945	—	Il-2	northwest of Grudziądz
112	28 August 1944	10:32	La-5	PQ 13245; 20 km (12 mi) northwest of Ostrov	146♠	16 February 1945	—	Il-2	northwest of Grudziądz
113	28 August 1944	13:42	Yak-9	PQ 13362; 40 km (25 mi) east of Nasielsk	147♠	16 February 1945	—	Il-2	northwest of Grudziądz
114	1 September 1944	14:12	Yak-7	PQ 13527; 20 km (12 mi) north of Warsaw	148♠	16 February 1945	—	Il-2	northwest of Grudziądz
115	1 September 1944	14:20	Yak-7	PQ 13527; 25 km (16 mi) north-northeast of Warsaw	149♠	16 February 1945	—	Il-2	northwest of Grudziądz
116	2 September 1944	08:22	Yak-7	PQ 13527; 25 km (16 mi) north-northeast of Warsaw	—	17 February 1945	—	Il-2	vicinity Braniewo
117	3 September 1944	16:00	Yak-7	20 km (12 mi) west of Ostrov	150	17 February 1945	—	Il-2	vicinity Braniewo
118	4 September 1944	15:58	Yak-7	PQ 13211; 15 km (9.3 mi) south of Ostrołęka	151	19 February 1945	—	Il-2	northwest of Nowe
119	5 September 1944	15:55	Yak-7	PQ 13345; 20 km (12 mi) east of Nasielsk	152	19 February 1945	—	Il-2	northwest of Nowe
120	5 September 1944	16:17	Il-2	PQ 13348; 20 km (12 mi) east of Nasielsk	—	20 February 1945	—	Boston	east of Gdańsk
121	6 September 1944	08:13	Yak-7	PQ 13381; 20 km (12 mi) east-southeast of Nasielsk	—	20 February 1945	—	Boston	east of Gdańsk
122	12 September 1944	09:21	P-39	PQ 13719 vicinity of Warsaw	—	20 February 1945	—	P-39	east of Gdańsk
123	18 September 1944	13:45	B-17	PQ 03661 vicinity of Warsaw	—	20 February 1945	—	P-39	east of Gdańsk
124	9 October 1944	14:31	Yak-9	PQ 26769; 20 km (12 mi) north-northeast of Nemakščiai	153	5 March 1945	—	Il-2	vicinity of Tczew
125	9 October 1944	14:46	MiG-3	PQ 26526 vicinity of Tauragė	154	9 March 1945	~12:00	Boston	Gdańsk-Wrzeszcz
126	9 October 1944	16:04	Yak-9	PQ 26849; 20 km (12 mi) southeast of Tauragė	155	9 March 1945	afternoon	La-5	vicinity of Tczew
127	10 October 1944	14:54	Yak-9	PQ 26728 vicinity of Tauragė	156	9 March 1945	afternoon	Il-2	Gdańsk-Wrzeszcz
128	16 October 1944	10:20	Il-2	PQ 25496; 25 km (16 mi) east of Trakehnen	—	15 March 1945	—	La-5	vicinity Gdańsk
129	16 October 1944	10:40	La-5	PQ 25435; 25 km (16 mi) east-southeast of Blumenfeld	158	18 March 1945	afternoon	Yak-3	vicinity of Mamonovo
130	18 October 1944	09:45	Yak-9	PQ 25613; 15 km (9.3 mi) southeast of Trakehnen	159	19 March 1945	~12:00	Boston	Gdańsk-Wrzeszcz
131	18 October 1944	13:15	Yak-9	PQ 25292; 25 km (16 mi) east of Blumenfeld	160	19 March 1945	afternoon	Il-2	vicinity of Gdańsk
132	18 October 1944	15:55	Yak-9	PQ 25431; 25 km (16 mi) east-southeast of Blumenfeld					
– III. Gruppe of Jagdgeschwader 51 –
161	22 March 1945	—	unknown	vicinity of Baltiysk	162	22 March 1945	—	unknown	vicinity of Baltiysk
– 3. Staffel of Jagdgeschwader 51 –
163	3 April 1945	—	Il-2	Gdańsk	165	7 April 1945	before noon	Il-2	unknown
164	7 April 1945	before noon	Il-2	unknown					
– VI. Gruppe of Jagdgeschwader 51 –
166	19 April 1945	afternoon	Il-2	vicinity of Strausberg	173♠	25 April 1945	—	P-39	unknown
167	22 April 1945	afternoon	Il-2	south of Stettin	174♠	25 April 1945	—	Boston	unknown
168	22 April 1945	afternoon	Il-2	south of Stettin	175♠	25 April 1945	—	Boston	unknown
169♠	25 April 1945	before noon	Yak-3	unknown	176♠	25 April 1945	—	Il-2	unknown
170♠	25 April 1945	before noon	Il-2	unknown	177♠	25 April 1945	—	Il-2	unknown
171♠	25 April 1945	before noon	Il-2	unknown	178	26 April 1945	—	Yak-3	northwest of Berlin
172♠	25 April 1945	before noon	Il-2	unknown					

=== Awards ===
- Iron Cross (1939)
  - 2nd Class (4 April 1943)
  - 1st Class (12 July 1943)
- Honor Goblet of the Luftwaffe (Ehrenpokal der Luftwaffe) on 20 September 1943 as Feldwebel and pilot (Note: According to Obermaier on 31 August 1943.)
- German Cross in Gold on 17 October 1943 as Feldwebel in the 1./Jagdgeschwader 51
- Knight's Cross of the Iron Cross with Oak Leaves
  - Knight's Cross on 5 February 1944 as Oberfeldwebel and pilot in the 3./Jagdgeschwader 51 "Mölders" (Note: According to Scherzer and Von Seemen as pilot in the 1./Jagdgeschwader 51 "Mölders")
  - 810th Oak Leaves on 28 March 1945 as Oberleutnant and Staffelkapitän of the 3./Jagdgeschwader 51 "Mölders"

=== Dates of rank ===
Wehrmacht
1 July 1943:	Feldwebel (sergeant)
1 August 1943:	Oberfeldwebel (staff sergeant)
5 February 1944:	Leutnant (second lieutenant), backdated to 1 January 1944
1 November 1944:	Oberleutnant (first lieutenant)
Bundeswehr
22 November 1956:	Hauptmann (captain)
6 March 1959:	Major (major)
3 June 1962:	Oberstleutnant (lieutenant colonel)
14 June 1965:	Oberst (colonel)

== Notes ==
Military offices
Preceded by Oberstleutnant Erich Hartmann	Commander of Jagdgeschwader 71 "Richthofen"; 30 May 1962 – 1 April 1967	Succeeded by Oberst Horst Dieter Kallerhoff
