= Wölbling =

- Municipality
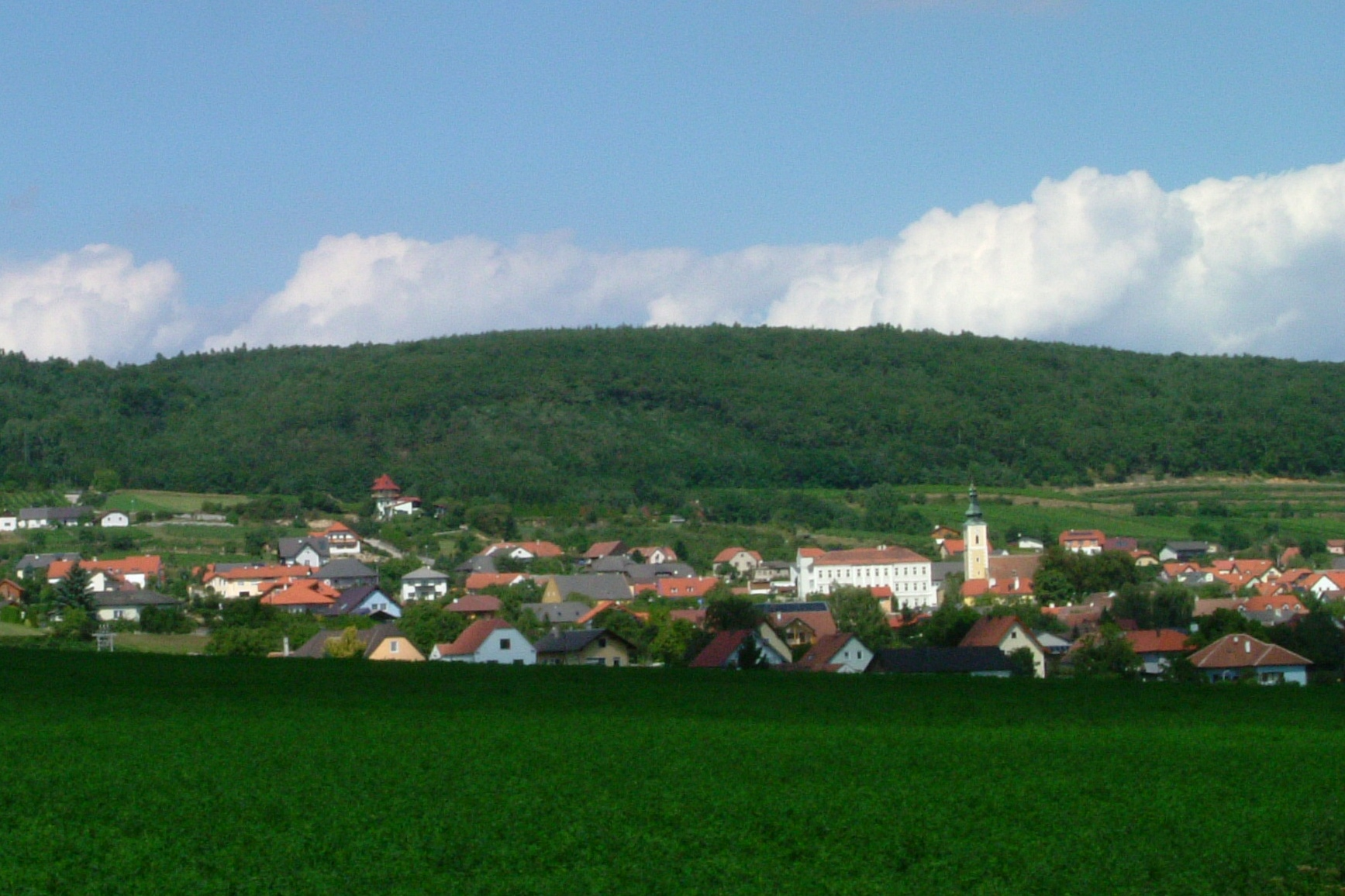
- View of Oberwölbling

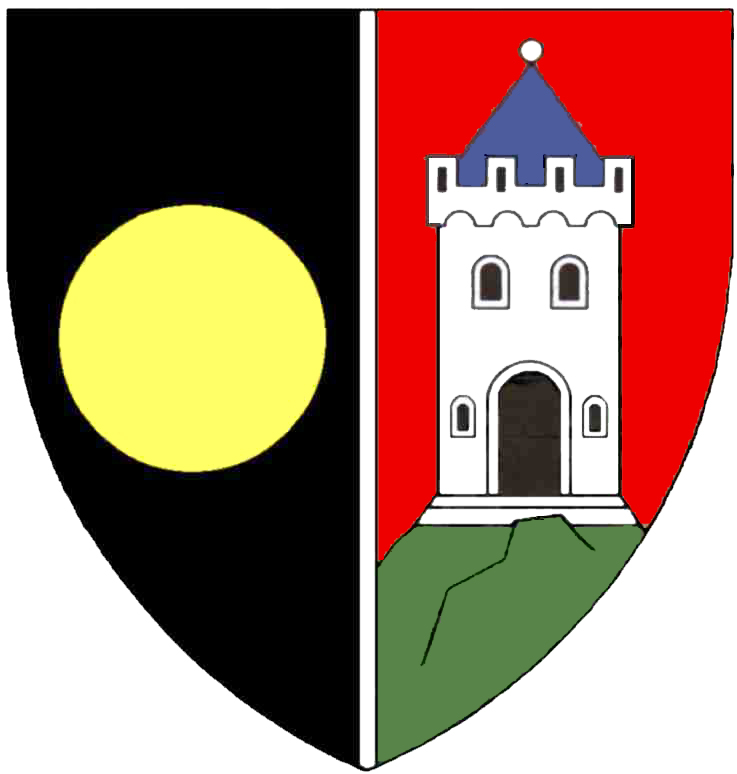
- Coat of arms

- Location within Austria
- Coordinates: 48°19′00″N 15°35′00″E
- Country: Austria
- State: Lower Austria
- District: Sankt Pölten-Land

Government
  - Mayor: Karin Gorenzel (SPÖ)

Area
  - Total: 32.29 km^{2} (12.47 sq mi)
- Elevation: 342 m (1,122 ft)

Population (2018-01-01)
  - Total: 2,571
  - Density: 79.62/km^{2} (206.2/sq mi)
- Time zone: UTC+1 (CET)
  - Summer (DST): UTC+2 (CEST)
- Postal code: 3124
- Area code: 02786
- Vehicle registration: PL
- Website: www.woelbling.at

Wölbling is a municipality in the district of Sankt Pölten-Land in the Austrian state of Lower Austria.

== Population ==
Historical population
Year	Pop.	±%
1951	1,996	—
1961	1,966	−1.5%
1971	2,103	+7.0%
1981	2,014	−4.2%
1991	2,376	+18.0%
2001	2,532	+6.6%
2012	2,446	−3.4%
