= Taktisches Luftwaffengeschwader 71 "Richthofen" =

Coordinates: 53°34′N 7°46′E

Taktisches Luftwaffengeschwader 71 "Richthofen" (Tactical Air Force Wing 71) — III —
- Coat of arms of Tactical Air Force Wing 71 "Richthofen"
- Active: 6 June 1959–present
- Country: Germany
- Branch: German Air Force
- Role: Air Defence, Rapid Deployment, NATO Command Force
- Garrison/HQ: Wittmundhafen Air Base
- Patron: Manfred von Richthofen

Commanders
- Current commander: Oberstleutnant Oliver Spoerner
- Notable commanders: Erich Hartmann, Günther Josten

Aircraft flown
- Fighter: Formerly: Canadair Sabre; F-104 Starfighter; F-4 Phantom II; Present: Eurofighter Typhoon

Taktisches Luftwaffengeschwader 71 "Richthofen", formerly known as Jagdgeschwader 71 (JG 71) Richthofen is a Fighter wing of the German Air Force. JG 71 was West Germany's first operational jet fighter unit. On 29 June 2013 the last F-4F Phantom fighter flew for the last time, before the type was taken out of service. The wing is now equipped with the Eurofighter Typhoon.

Due to restructuring of the German Air Force, JG 71 was temporally transferred into the newly established Tactical Group "Richthofen" on 1 October 2013. Its parent unit was now Tactical Wing 31 in Nörvenich. On 5 July 2016 the restructuring was reverted and the fighter group again upgraded to a fighter wing.

== History ==
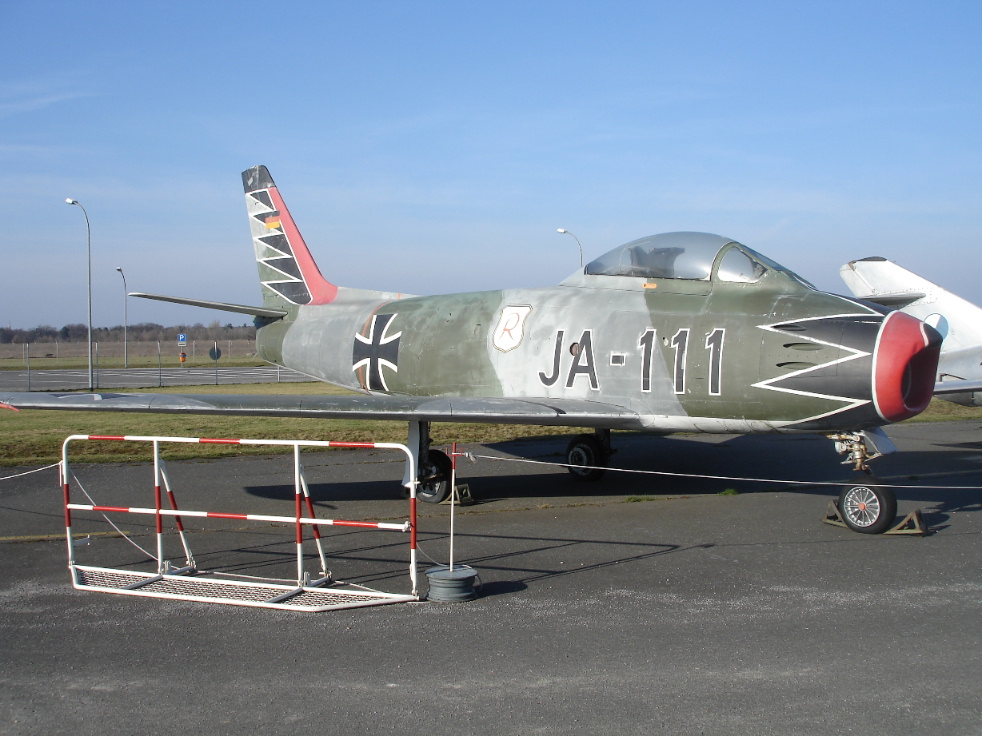
German Air Force JG 71 "Richthofen" Canadair Sabre at the Luftwaffenmuseum. This one specifically bears the personal markings of The Black Devil (Erich Hartmann).

The unit was formed in June 1959, equipped with 50 Canadair Sabre Mk.6s and stationed at the former RAF Ahlhorn. The highest-scoring fighter pilot of all time, Erich Hartmann, flew the Canadair Sabre (reputedly his favorite fighter plane design), and aircraft such as the Lockheed F-104 Starfighter, in the newly formed wing in the late 1950s.

On 21 April 1961, the 43rd anniversary of the death of “Red Baron” Rittmeister Manfred von Richthofen, JG 71 was given the honorary title of “Richthofen” by Federal President Heinrich Lübke. In 1963, JG 71 transferred from Ahlhorn to Wittmundhafen Air Base.

May 1963 saw the introduction of the first F-104 Starfighters into German Air Force service. In 1974 the Wing obtained its first F-4F Phantom II's and on 19 September 1974 the unit's Starfighters were decommissioned. In 1988 the Wing's secondary role of Fighter Bomber Attack was given up so that JG 71 is now exclusively a Fighter Wing.

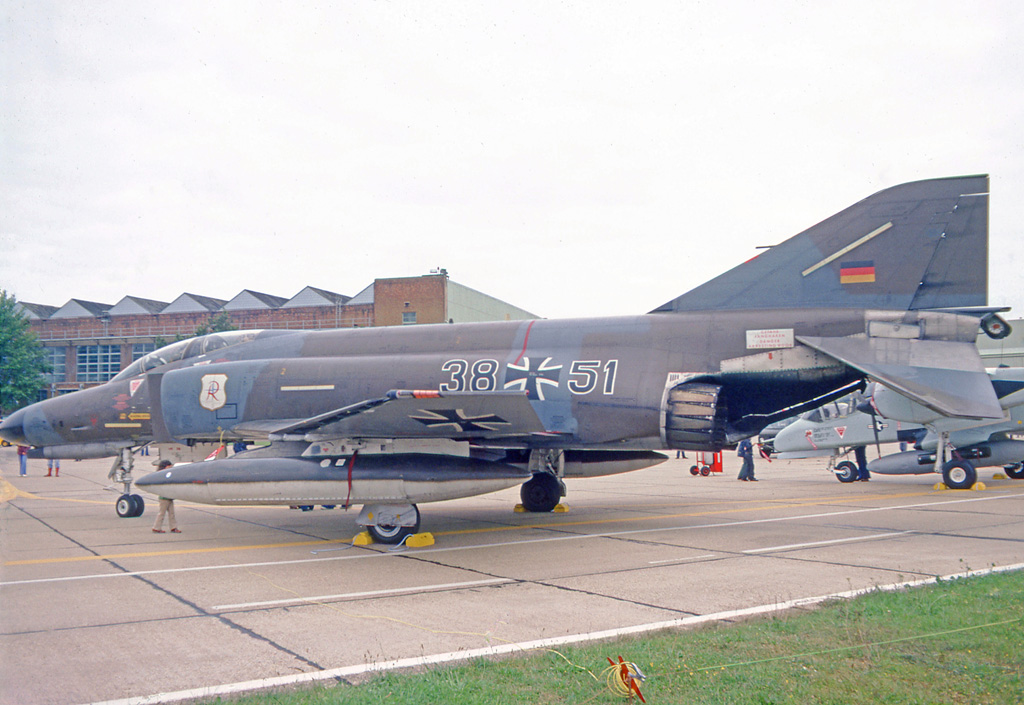
F-4F Phantom II of JG 71 in 1978 wearing the unit shield marking on its engine intake cover

JG 71 is part of NATO's Immediate Reaction Force, meaning that it must be ready to deploy twelve aircraft on five days' notice. However, the likelihood of having to deploy at such short notice is almost nil, so fulfilling Quick Reaction Alert (QRA) interceptions for Northern Germany is shared with JG 74, which completed Eurofighter conversion in late 2008. Depending on the situation, the dividing line between the two units is roughly Frankfurt-Berlin, with JG 71 protecting the northern part of Germany.

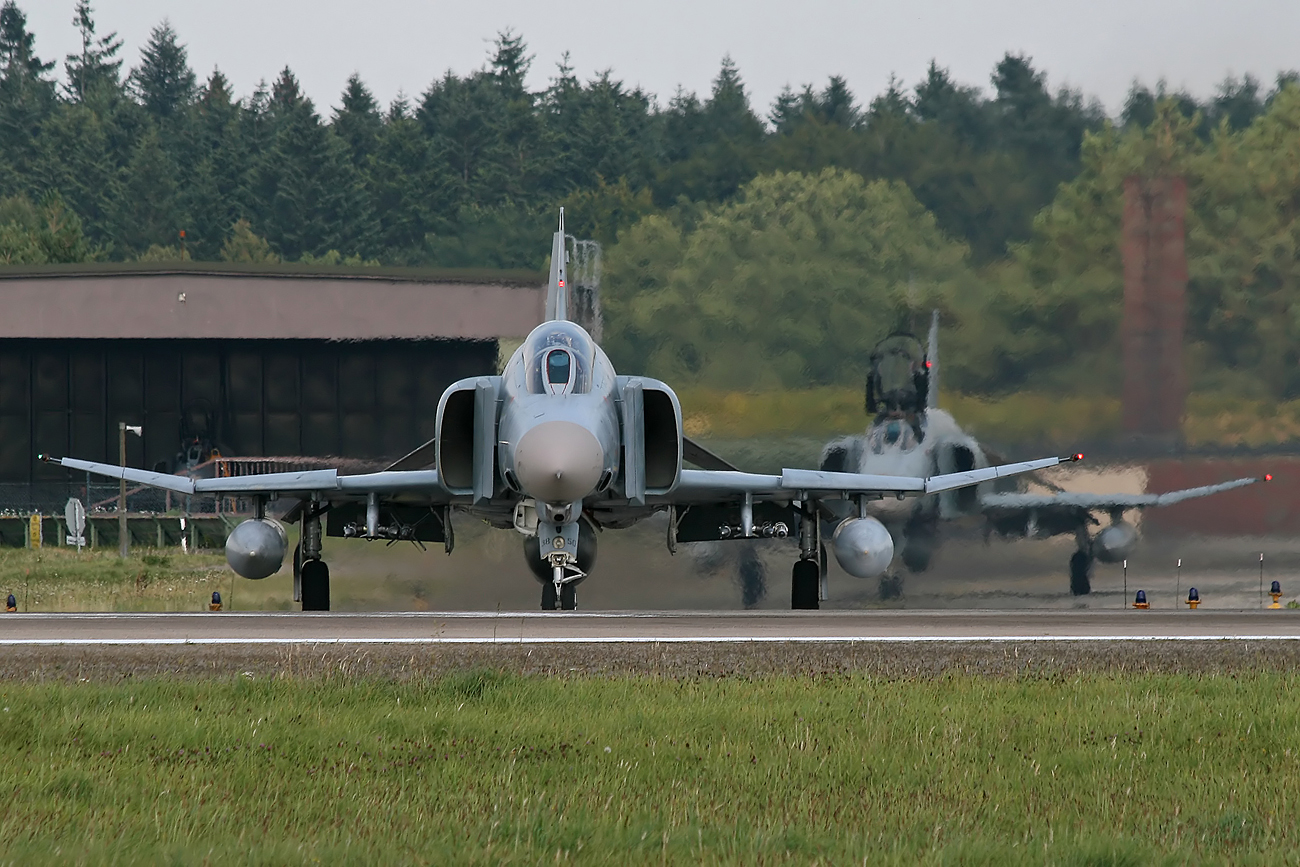
Two F-4 Phantom II of JG 71

In 2007, for the second year running, JG 71 was German Air Force's record-breaking fighter wing in terms of flying activity, clocking up over 7,600 flying hours. The unit is on 24/7 readiness to intercept unidentified aircraft over Germany. Between June and September 2008 the unit took part in NATO's Baltic Air Policing. The unit participated in a Baltic Air Policing deployment from 1 November 2009. In June 2010 six of the unit's F-4s were deployed to Iceland as part of NATOs Icelandic Air Policing mission.

In 2010 JG 71 began receiving its first Eurofighters. The wing flew a mixed fleet for three years until June 2013 when the last Phantoms were withdrawn.
