= German Air Force Regiment "Friesland" =

- Objektschutzregiment der Luftwaffe "Friesland"
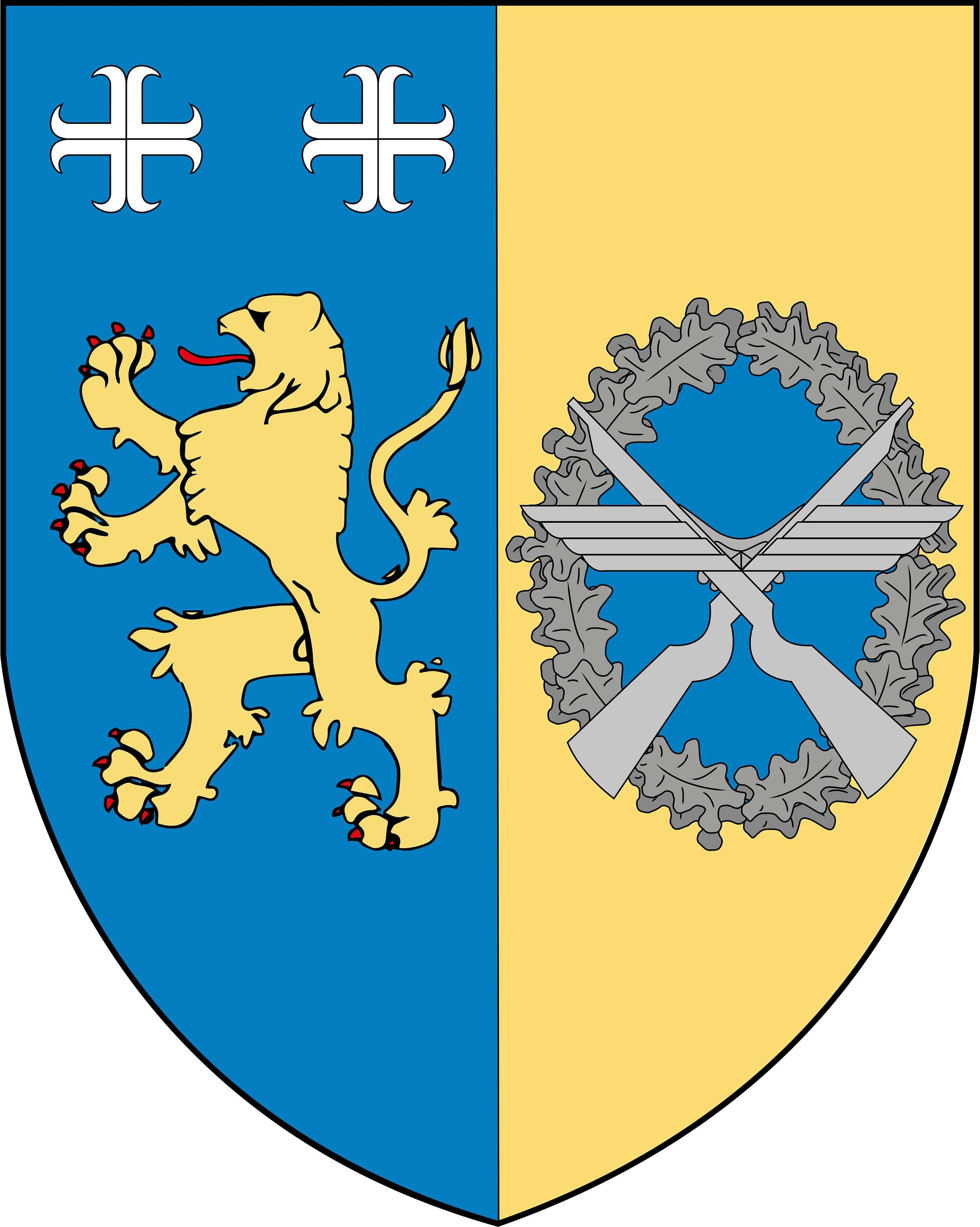
- Coat of arms of the Objektschutzregiment Lw
- Active: 1 July 2006–present
- Country: Germany
- Branch: German Air Force
- Type: Air force ground forces
- Size: Regiment
- Garrison/HQ: I. Bn - Schortens; II. Bn - Diepholz; III. Bn - Diepholz/Schortens; Regt HQ - Schortens
- Mottos: Semper Communis (Latin: Always together)
- Engagements: War in Afghanistan • ISAF

Commanders
- Current commander: Colonel (Oberst) Helge Gerken

Insignia
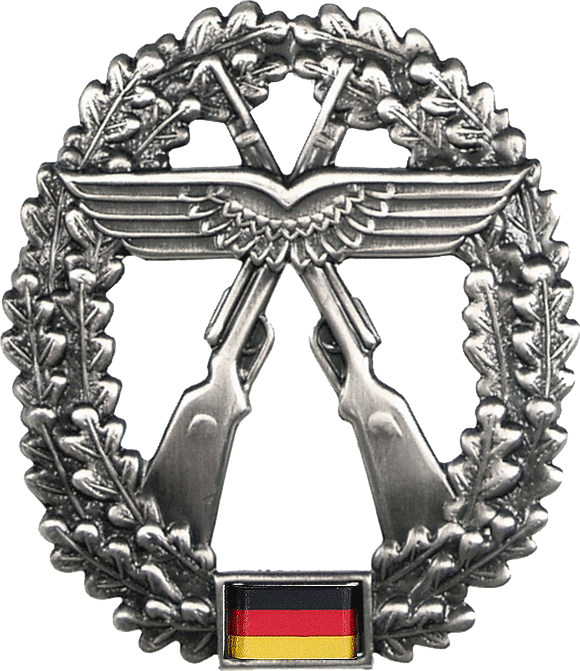
- Beret badge

The German Air Force Regiment “Friesland” (German: Objektschutzregiment der Luftwaffe (ObjSRgtLw) "Friesland", lit. 'Object Protection Regiment of the Air Force') is a ground forces regiment sized branch of the German Air Force with its main bases in Diepholz and Schortens. However, in the future this regiment will be located at Jever Air Base.

== Organisation and role ==
The purpose of the regiment is ground-based defence of air force bases and installations, as well as capturing and securing enemy air installations. It is divided into three battalions (Objektschutzbataillone). Each battalion, except for an inactive one, consists of a number of Staffeln (squadrons), equivalent to an infantry company.

The two active battalions are structured based on the specialty of the unit.

- I Bn specialises in infantry with four squadrons.
- II Bn specialises in logistics and engineering with an additional firefighting unit.
- III Bn (Force Protection) is currently inactive and can be manned with reservists.

== Structure ==
- Objektschutzregiment der Luftwaffe
  - Staff (headquarters - HQ)
    - Training Squadron (Sqn)
    - Feldnachrichtenkräfte Luftwaffe (HUMINT)
  - I Battalion (Bn) in Schortens
    - HQ I
    - 1 Sqn (Specialized Forces & basic training)
    - 2 Sqn (Force Protection)
    - 3 Sqn (Force Protection)
    - 4 Sqn (Force Protection)
  - II Bn
    - HQ II in Diepholz
    - 5 Sqn (Mission Logistics), Shortens
    - 6 Sqn (Combat Engineers), Diepholz
    - 7 Sqn (Firefighting), Schortens
  - III Bn Schortens
    - HQ III in Schortens
    - 8 Sqn (Force Protection)
    - 9 Sqn (Force Protection)
    - 10 Sqn (Force Protection)

== History ==
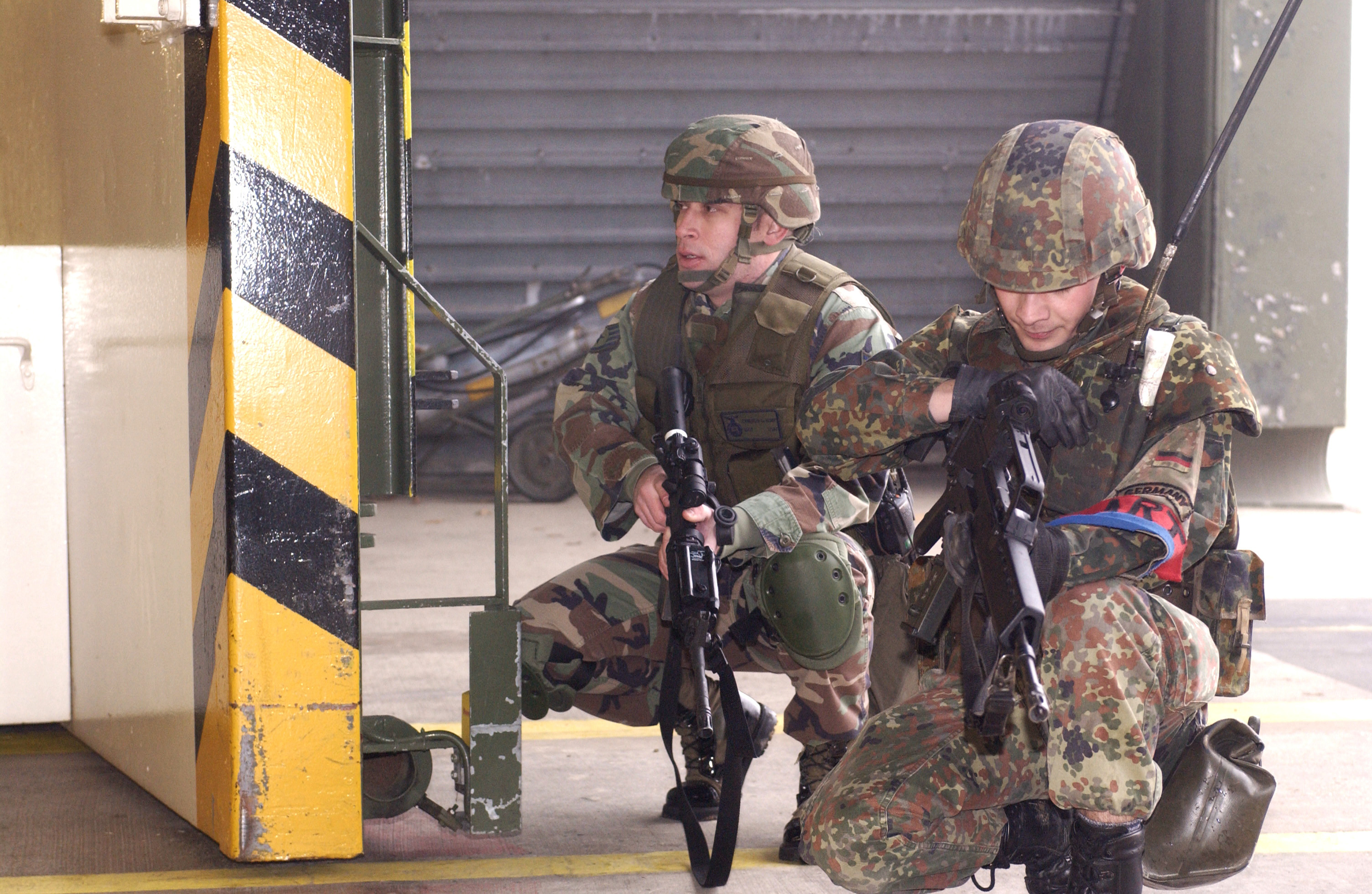
An airman of the Air Force Regiment (right) together with an American Security Forces Specialist during an exercise at Büchel Air Base, Germany in 2007

Previously the German Air Force had an Objektschutz (Force Protection) force in each Fliegerhorstgruppe (Air Base group) to protect the air base, as well as an Objektschutzbataillon. However, due to structural changes in the Bundeswehr, all previous forces have been united to one regiment, the Objektschutzregiment. Thus on July 1, 2006, the Objektschutzbataillone were dissolved and instead the new Objektschutzregiment "Friesland" was founded. The Objektschutzregiment "Friesland" then comprised all former battalions (3 active and 1 inactive).

In 2006 and 2007 the 3. Sqn was deployed to Mazari Sharif, Afghanistan, as part of the German ISAF contingent.

=== Restructuring ===
Due to restructuring of the German armed forces, it was announced in October 2011 that the Kerpen barracks of II Battalion would be closed.

The entire regiment was restructured on 1 April 2014. The NBC assets were transferred to the Joint Support Service while Explosive Ordnance Disposal tasks were handed over to the army. The close-range air defence role was transferred to Flugabwehrraketengeschwader 1. A new squadron for mission logistics was set up in the II Battalion at Schortens. The combat engineers from Diepholz will be combined in a new Force Protection squadron in Schortens.

== History of the honorary name ==
Official history from the German Air Force: On April 26, 1988, the Jagdbombergeschwader 38 (Fighter/bomber Wing 38) received the name extension "Friesland". Then Minister of Defence Dr. Manfred Wörner gave the squadron its name. In his speech, he said 'This name will show the connection and the good relationship between the Squadron and the public'. After the Jagdbombergeschwader 38 was decommissioned on 31 August 2005, it was the wish of Sven Ambrosy, County Official for Friesland, that this tradition of cohesion be continued by the Objektschutzregiment der Luftwaffe.
