= Taktisches Luftwaffengeschwader 33 =

Coordinates: 50.1739°N 7.0633°E

Tactical Air Force Wing 33
- Taktisches Luftwaffengeschwader 33
- Active: 1 July 1958–present
- Country: Germany
- Branch: German Air Force
- Role: Ground Attack
- Part of: 2nd Air Force Division (2. Luftwaffendivision)
- Garrison/HQ: Büchel Air Base

Commanders
- Current commander: Colonel Holger Radmann
- Notable commanders: Walter Krupinski

Aircraft flown
- Attack: Formerly: Republic F-84F Thunderstreak, Lockheed F-104 Starfighter; Present: Panavia Tornado IDS

Taktisches Luftwaffengeschwader 33 (Tactical Air Force Wing 33; abbreviated as: TaktLwG 33), formerly known as Jagdbombergeschwader 33 (Fighter-Bomber Wing 33; abbreviated as: JaBoG 33) is a fighter-bomber wing of the German Air Force (Luftwaffe). The wing is based in west Germany at Büchel Air Base. Its role are Air Interdiction, Offensive Counter Air and Close Air Support. The wing flies the Panavia Tornado IDS.

The Taktisches Luftwaffengeschwader rondle and patch display a top down view of the Tornado IDS.

The unit was renamed on 1 October 2013 in the course of the restructuring of the German Air Force.

== History ==
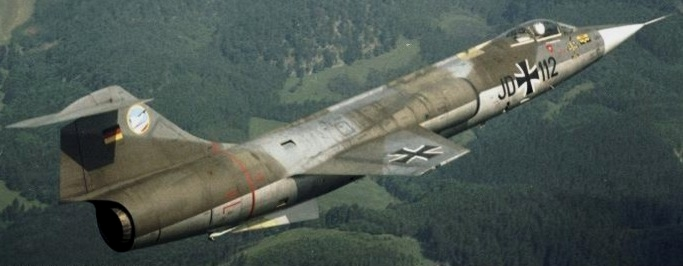
F-104 Starfighter

On 13 November 1956 the Luftwaffe raised its first flying school at Fürstenfeldbruck Air Base under Major Walter Krupinski. The unit was named Waffenschule der Luftwaffe 30 (Air Force Weapons School 30) and flew Republic F-84F Thunderstreak fighters. At the end of October 1957 the unit began its transfer to Büchel Air Base, where on 1 July 1958 the School was officially reformed as Jagdbombergeschwader 33.

In May 1959 the wing transferred for a month-long training exercise to Bandirma Air Base in Turkey. Since the end of 1960 JaboG 33 regularly visits Decimomannu Air Base on Sardinia to participate in NATO Dissimilar Air Combat Training exercises. Beginning in August 1962 the wing began transition to Lockheed F-104 Starfighters. On 30 May 1985 the wing had completed its transition to the Panavia Tornado IDS.

The German Air Force intends to keep 46 Tornado IDS of JaBoG 33 in service until at least 2025 to ensure Germany's participation in NATO's nuclear sharing concept.

== Nuclear sharing ==
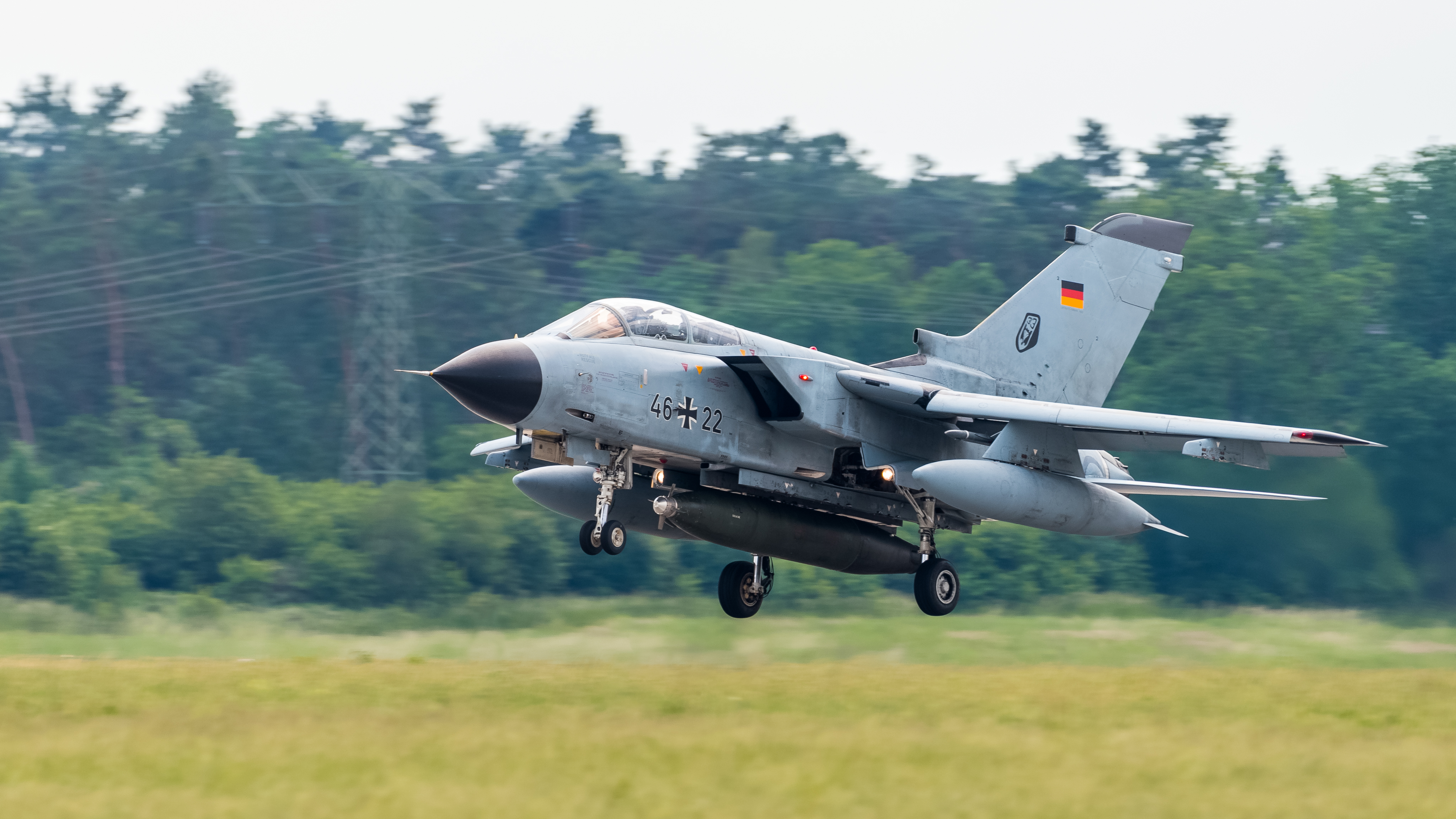
Tornado IDS of the TaktLwG 33

Jagdbombergeschwader 33 is the only remaining unit in the German Air Force capable of delivering nuclear weapons. In bunkers at Büchel Air Base the United States Air Force can store up to 44 B61 nuclear bombs for use on the German Tornados. The number of currently stored bombs at Büchel is classified, but estimated to be between 10 and 20 bombs. The bombs are serviced, guarded and in case of war activated by the US Air Force's 702nd Munitions Support Squadron of the 52d Munitions Maintenance Group/52d Fighter Wing.

Due to the Büchel air base having a special mandate to ensure the safety of its nuclear weapons, the wing is the only flying unit of the Air Force to have an attached security squadron, the Luftwaffensicherungsstaffel "S". It is equipped with 429 soldiers, the largest squadron of the Air Force. On 1 April 2013 it was reclassified into two sections.
