= Jever Air Base =

Former military airfield in Germany

Jever Air Base RAF Jever Advanced Landing Ground (ALG) B-117
- Jever, Lower Saxony in Germany
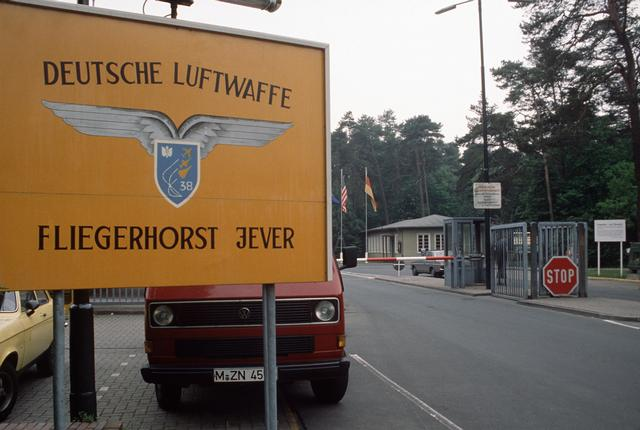
- Fliegerhorst Jever in 1986

Site information
- Owner: Federal Defence Forces of Germany
- Operator: Luftwaffe (National Socialist), 1936–1945; Royal Air Force, 1945–1961; German Air Force (FRG), 1961–Present

Location
- Shown within Lower Saxony, Germany
- Coordinates: 53°32′02″N 007°53′05″E

Site history
- Built: 1936
- In use: 1936-present

Airfield information
- Identifiers: ICAO: ETNJ
- Elevation: 7 metres (23 ft) AMSL
Runways
Direction	Length and surface
10/28	2,480 metres (8,136 ft) Concrete

Jever Air Base is a former German Air Force military air base, located 4.3 km west-southwest of Schortens in Lower Saxony, Germany. It was the home of parts of the German Air Force Regiment. Military flying ceased in September 2013.

== History ==
The airfield was originally opened in 1936 for the Luftwaffe. It was seized during World War II by the British Army in April 1945 and taken over by the Royal Air Force (RAF). It was designated as Advanced Landing Ground B-117 Jever.

It was later designated RAF Jever and used by the RAF beginning in 1952 as part of the Cold War British Forces in West Germany. RAF units assigned were:

- 1952: 20 Squadron reformed with de Havilland Vampire FB.9
- 1952–1953: 112 Squadron with Vampire FB.5
- 1952–1961: 4 Squadron & 93 Squadron with Vampire FB.5 (replaced with FB.9), later Canadair Sabre F.4, later Hawker Hunter F.4 (replaced with F.6)
- 1955–1957: 98 Squadron & 118 Squadron with Hunter F.4
- 1957–1961: 2 Squadron with Supermarine Swift FR.5 and Hunter FR.10

In 1961 the base was returned to the control of the German Air Force and became a NATO Air Base.

In September 1979 NATO's Tactical Leadership Programme (TLP) moved to Jever. TLP prepares NATO allied coalition forces for worldwide tactical air operations. In March 1989 TLP subsequently relocated to Florennes Air Base in Belgium.
