= German Air and Space Force =

Air warfare branch of the German military

- Luftwaffe
- Founded: 9 January 1956; 70 years ago
- Country: Germany
- Branch: Air and Space Force
- Role: Aerial Warfare; Space Warfare
- Size: 27,725; 380 aircraft
- Part of: Bundeswehr
- Air Force Command: Gatow
- Nickname: Team Luftwaffe
- Mottos: Immer im Einsatz; "Always in action"
- Engagements: Operation Deliberate Force; Kosovo War; War in Afghanistan; Military intervention against ISIL; Northern Mali conflict
- Website: luftwaffe.de

Commanders
- Inspector of the Air and Space Force: Generalleutnant Holger Neumann
- Deputy Inspector of the Air and Space Force: Generalleutnant Lutz Kohlhaus
- Chief of Staff: Generalmajor Wolfgang Ohl
- Notable commanders: General Josef Kammhuber; General Johannes Steinhoff; Generalleutnant Günther Rall

Insignia
- Roundel

- Fin flash

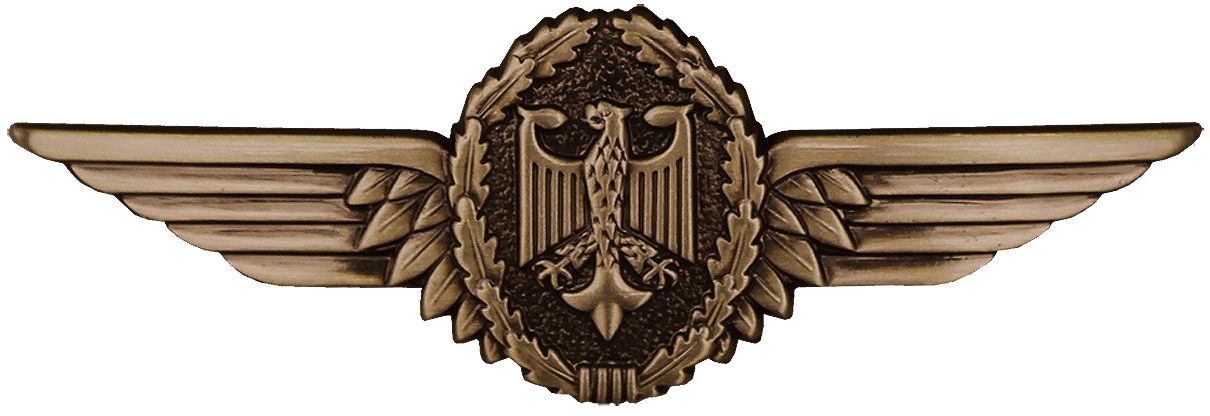
- Pilot's Flying Badge

Aircraft flown
- Attack: Tornado IDS
- Electronic warfare: Tornado ECR
- Fighter: F-35A, Eurofighter Typhoon, Tornado IDS
- Helicopter: CH-53, H145M, AS532
- Trainer: Grob G-120, T-6 Texan II, T-38 Talon
- Transport: A400M, Global Express 5000, A319, A350, A321, C-130J Super Hercules
- Tanker: A400M, KC-130J

The German Air and Space Force (German: Luftwaffe, lit. 'air weapon', pronounced [ˈlʊftvafə]) is the aerial warfare and space warfare branch of the Bundeswehr, the armed forces of Germany. The Luftwaffe (as part of the Bundeswehr) was founded in 1956 during the era of the Cold War as the aerial warfare branch of the armed forces of West Germany. After the reunification of West and East Germany in 1990, it integrated parts of the air force of the former German Democratic Republic, which itself had been founded in 1956 as part of the National People's Army. There is no organizational continuity between the current Luftwaffe of the Bundeswehr and the former Luftwaffe of the Wehrmacht founded in 1935, which was completely disbanded in 1945/46 after World War II. The term Luftwaffe that is used for both the historic and the current German air force is the German-language generic designation of any air force. In 2026, the German Air Force was renamed the German Air and Space Force.

The commander of the Luftwaffe is Lieutenant General Holger Neumann. As of 2015, the Luftwaffe uses eleven air bases, two of which host no flying units. Furthermore, the Air Force has a presence at three civil airports. In 2012, the Luftwaffe had an authorized strength of 28,475 active airmen and 4,914 reservists.

== History ==
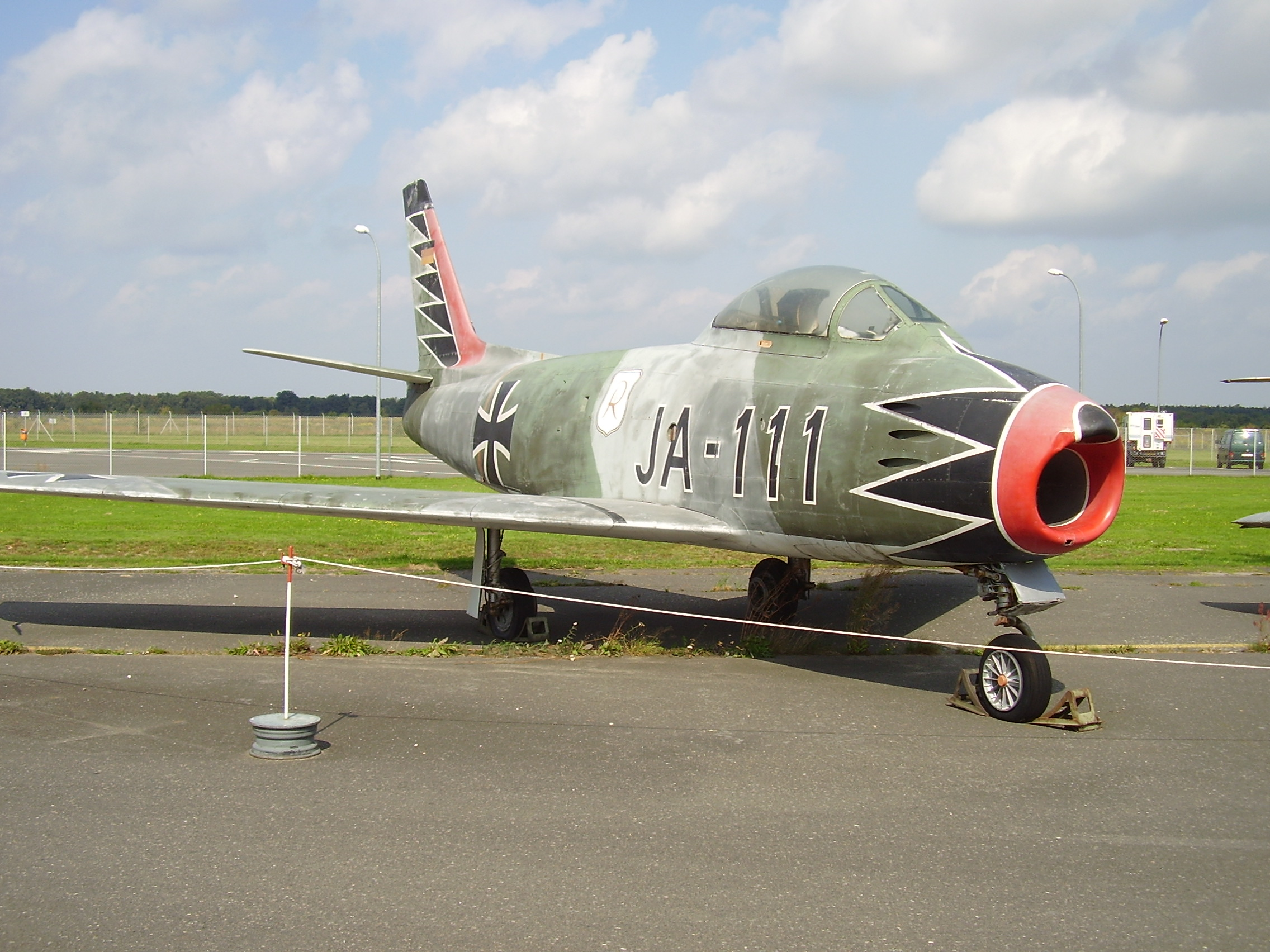
This Canadair CL-13 is preserved at the Military History Museum in Berlin.

After World War II, German aviation was severely curtailed, and military aviation was completely forbidden after the Allied Control Commission disbanded the Nazi-era Luftwaffe in August 1946. This changed in 1955 when West Germany joined NATO, as the Western Allies believed that Germany was needed to counter the increasing military threat posed by the Soviet Union and its Warsaw Pact allies. Therefore, on 9 January 1956, a new German Air Force called Luftwaffe was founded as a branch of the new Bundeswehr.

Many well-known fighter pilots of the Wehrmacht's Luftwaffe joined the new post-war air force and underwent refresher training in the US before returning to West Germany to upgrade on the latest U.S.-supplied hardware. These included Erich Hartmann, Gerhard Barkhorn, Günther Rall and Johannes Steinhoff. Steinhoff became commander-in-chief of the Luftwaffe, with Rall as his immediate successor. Another pilot of World War II, Josef Kammhuber, also made a significant career in the post-war Luftwaffe, retiring in 1962 as Chief Inspector of the Air Force (Inspekteur der Luftwaffe).

Despite the partial reliance of the new air force on airmen who had served in the Wehrmacht's air arm, there was no organizational continuity between the old and the new Luftwaffe. This is in line with the policy of the Bundeswehr on the whole, which does not consider itself a successor of the Wehrmacht and does not follow the traditions of any other previous German military organization.

=== First years ===
The first volunteers of the Luftwaffe arrived at the Nörvenich Air Base in January 1956. In the same year, the Luftwaffe was given with its first aircraft, the US-made Republic F-84 Thunderstreak. At first, the Luftwaffe was divided into two operational commands, one in Northern Germany, aligned with the British-led Second Allied Tactical Air Force, and the other in Southern Germany, aligned with the American-led Fourth Allied Tactical Air Force.

In 1957, the Luftwaffe took command of the Army Air Defence Troops located in Rendsburg and began the expansion of its own air defense missile capabilities. The first squadron to be declared operational was the Air Transport Wing 61 at Erding Air Base, followed by the 31st Fighter-Bomber Squadron at Büchel Air Base. In 1958, the Luftwaffe received its first conscripts. In 1959, the Luftwaffe declared the 11th Missile Group in Kaufbeuren armed with MGM-1 Matador surface-to-surface tactical nuclear cruise missiles operational. The same year Fighter Wing 71 (Jagdgeschwader 71) equipped with Canadair CL-13 fighters became operational at Ahlhorner Heide Air Base. All aircraft sported—and continue to sport—the Iron Cross on the fuselage, harking back to the pre-March 1918 days of World War I, while the national flag of West Germany is displayed on the tail.

=== Cold War ===
In 1963, the Luftwaffe saw its first major reorganization. The two operational Air Force Group Commands – Command North and Command South were both split into two mixed Air Force divisions containing flying and air defense units and one Support division. Additionally, a 7th Air Force division was raised in Schleswig-Holstein containing flying units, missile units, support units, and the German Navy's naval aviation and placed under command of Allied Forces Baltic Approaches.

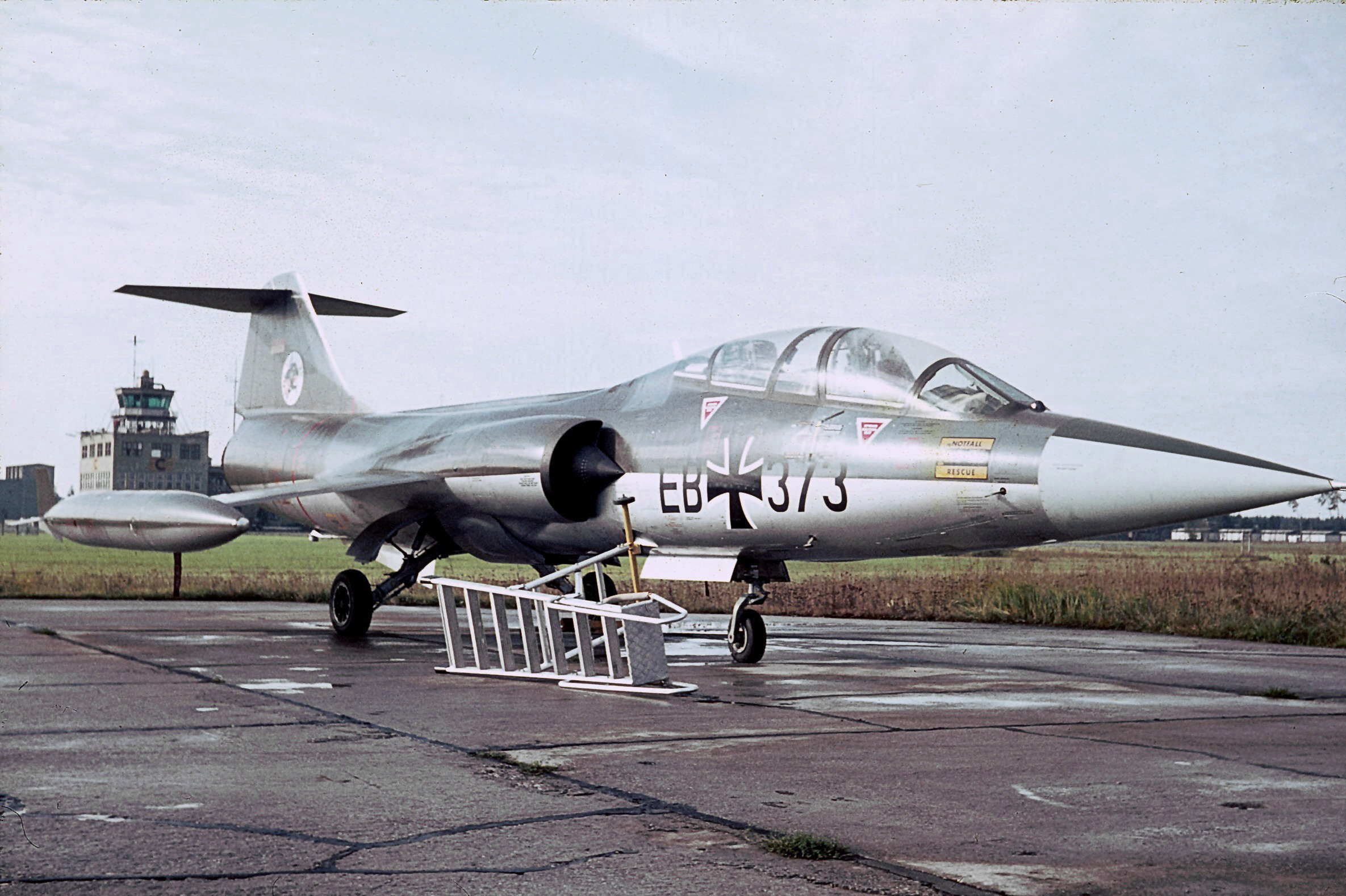
Lockheed TF-104G Starfighter (two seater) of recoonnaissance wing 52 (Leck) at Fürstenfeldbruck Air Base (1967)

In 1960, the Luftwaffe received its first Lockheed F-104 Starfighter jets. The Starfighter remained in service for the entire duration of the Cold War, with the last being taken out of service in 1991. The Luftwaffe received 916 Starfighters, 292 of which crashed, resulting in the deaths of 116 pilots. The disastrous service record of the Starfighter led to the Starfighter crisis in 1966 as a reaction to 27 Starfighter crashes with 17 casualties in 1965 alone. The West German public referred to the Starfighter as the Witwenmacher (widow-maker), fliegender Sarg (flying coffin), Fallfighter (falling fighter) and Erdnagel (tent peg, literally "ground nail").

On 25 August 1966, the German Defence Minister Kai-Uwe von Hassel relieved the Chief Inspector of the Air Force Generalleutnant Werner Panitzki, and transferred Colonel Erich Hartmann, commanding officer of the 71st Fighter Squadron, as both had publicly criticized the acquisition of the Starfighter as a "purely political decision". On 2 September 1966, Johannes Steinhoff, with Günther Rall as deputy, became the new Chief Inspector of the Air Force. Steinhoff and his deputy Günther Rall noted that the non-German F-104s proved much safer. The Americans blamed the high loss rate of the Luftwaffe F-104s on the extremely low-level and aggressive flying of German pilots rather than any faults in the aircraft. Steinhoff and Rall went to America to learn to fly the Starfighter under Lockheed instruction and noted some specifics in the training (a lack of mountain and foggy-weather training), combined with handling capabilities (rapidly initiated, high G turns) of the aircraft that could cause accidents. Steinhoff and Rall, therefore, changed the training regimen for the F-104 pilots, and the accident rates fell to those comparable or better than other air forces. They also brought about the high level of training and professionalism seen today throughout the Luftwaffe, and the start of a strategic direction for Luftwaffe pilots to engage in tactical and combat training outside of Germany. However, the F-104 never lived down its reputation as a "widow-maker", and was replaced by the Luftwaffe with the McDonnell Douglas F-4 Phantom II fighter and the Panavia Tornado fighter-bomber in many units much earlier than in other national air forces.

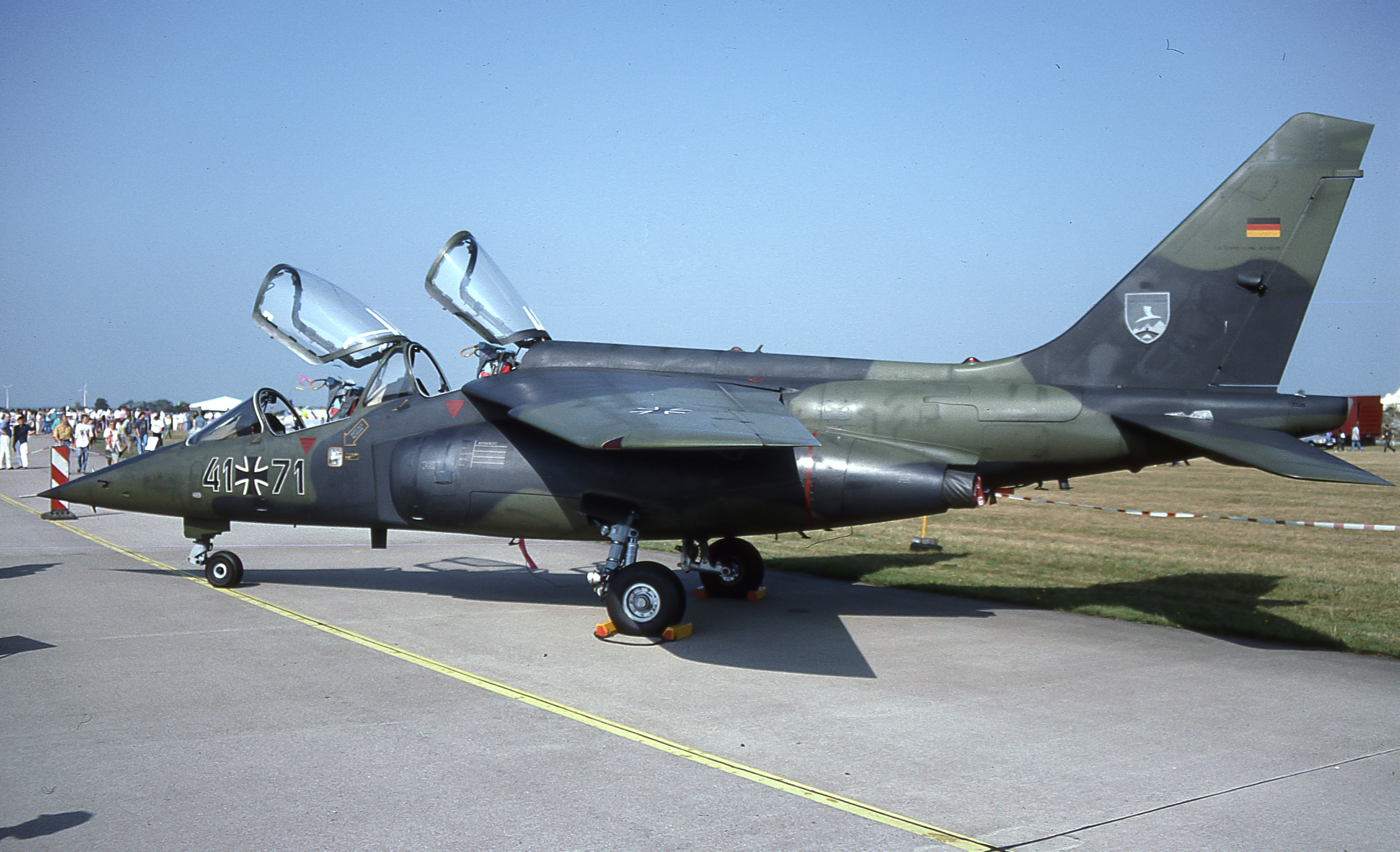
An Alpha Jet A in 1996

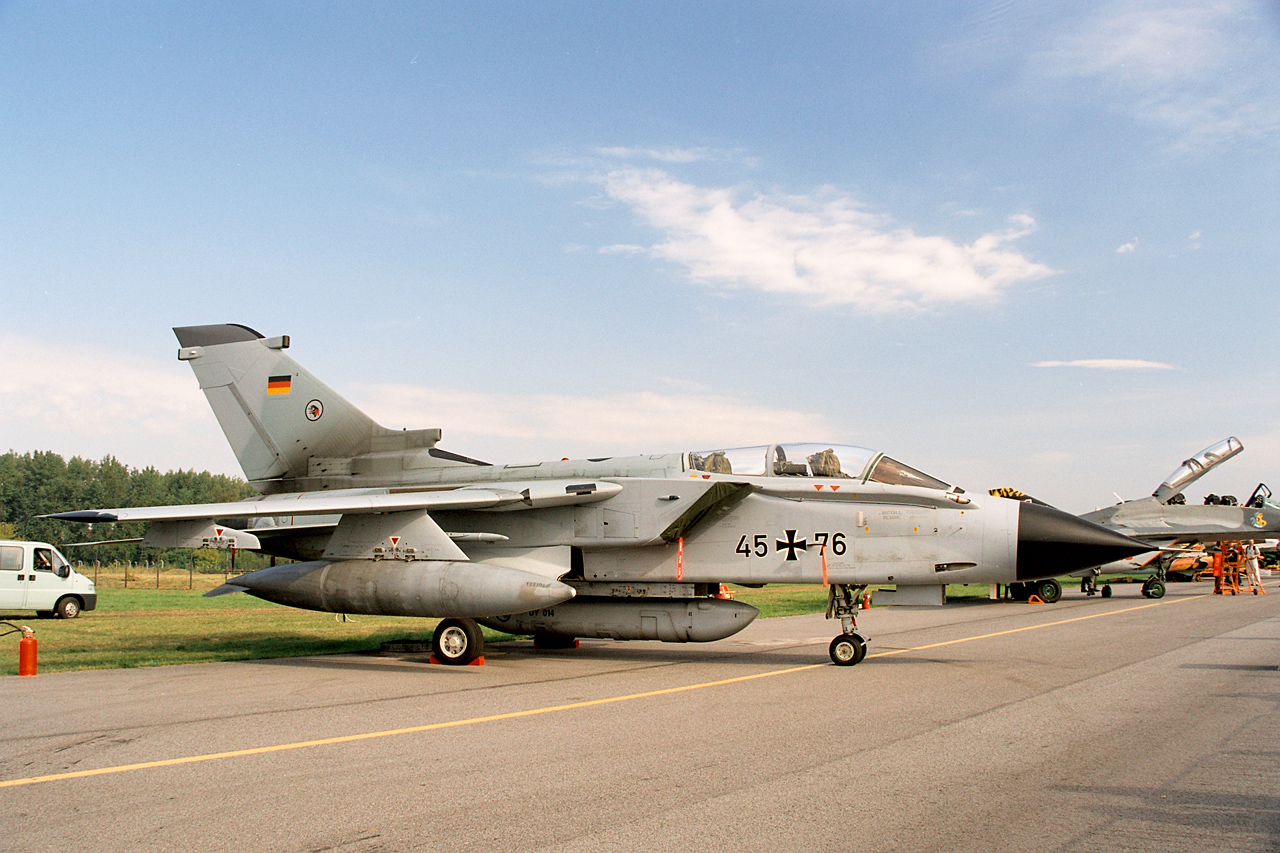
One of 212 Panavia Tornado IDSs delivered to the Luftwaffe

On Steinhoff's initiative, the Luftwaffe opened the German Air Force Command USA/Canada (Deutsches Luftwaffenkommando USA/Kanada) in Fort Bliss, where the Luftwaffe trained its missile and air defense troops, and pilots received their basic training. At the same time, the Luftwaffe opened a Tactical Training Command in Beja, Portugal, where pilots were trained in Close Air Support missions.

Between 1967 and 1970, the Luftwaffe undertook a major reorganization of its forces. The two operational commands were disbanded and the four mixed Air Force divisions were divided into two flying divisions and two air defense divisions. The remainder of the units were divided into functional commands:

- Air Force Operation Command (Luftwaffenführungsdienstkommando), with the signal regiments, the radar, and the signals intelligence units
- Air Force Training Command (Luftwaffenausbildungskommando), with the schools and training regiments
- Air Force Support Command (Luftwaffenunterstützungskommando), with all logistical, maintenance, and repair units, and the Material Office of the Air Force
- Air Force Transport Command (Lufttransportkommando), with the air transport squadrons.

Over the next decade, the Luftwaffe received large amounts of new equipment, including in 1968 the first C-160 Transall transport planes, in 1974 the F-4 Phantom II fighter-bombers, in 1978 the first Alpha Jet Version A light attack jets and in 1979 the first of 212 Panavia Tornado fighters.

In 1986, the air defense forces began to replace their Nike Hercules missile systems with state-of-the-art surface-to-air missile systems: first to arrive was the MIM-104 Patriot system, followed one year later by Roland short-range missile system.

==== Nuclear sharing ====
Germany is participating in NATO's nuclear sharing concept. Nuclear sharing is a concept that involves member countries without nuclear weapons of their own in the planning for the use of nuclear weapons by NATO, and in particular, provides for the armed forces of these countries to be involved in delivering these weapons in the event of their use.

Soon after its founding, the German Air Force began to train with the US Seventeenth Air Force in handling, arming, and delivering nuclear weapons. At first, the F-104 Starfighter was intended to be used solely as a nuclear delivery platform, armed with nuclear air-to-air and air-to-surface missiles, as well as nuclear bombs. The Tornado was the second air force plane fielded that was capable of delivering nuclear ammunition, although it was limited to delivering B61 nuclear bombs.

From 1965 through 1970, Missile Wings 1 and 2 fielded 16 Pershing 1 missile systems with nuclear warheads under U.S. Army custody. In 1970, the system was upgraded to Pershing 1a with 72 missiles. Although not directly affected by the 1988 Intermediate-Range Nuclear Forces Treaty, the Luftwaffe unilaterally removed the Pershing 1a missiles from its inventory in 1991, and the missiles were destroyed. At the end of the Cold War, more than 100,000 soldiers served in the Luftwaffe.

The United States still lends nuclear weapons for hypothetical use by the Luftwaffe under the nuclear sharing agreement. In 2007, 22 B61 nuclear bombs were still kept in Germany, stored at the Büchel Air Base for use with Tornado IDS fighter-bombers of the Tactical Air Force Wing 33. The American nuclear weapons formerly stored at Nörvenich Air Base, Ramstein Air Base, and Memmingen Air Base were all withdrawn from Germany during the mid-and-late-1990s.

By international treaties between Germany and the "Big Four" powers in Europe (that formerly occupied Germany), East Germany was a nuclear-free zone. The Big Four powers are the United States, Russia, the United Kingdom, and France, and the latter three have no nuclear weapons in Germany anymore.

=== Reunification ===
GDR Air Force plane marking

FRF Air Force plane marking

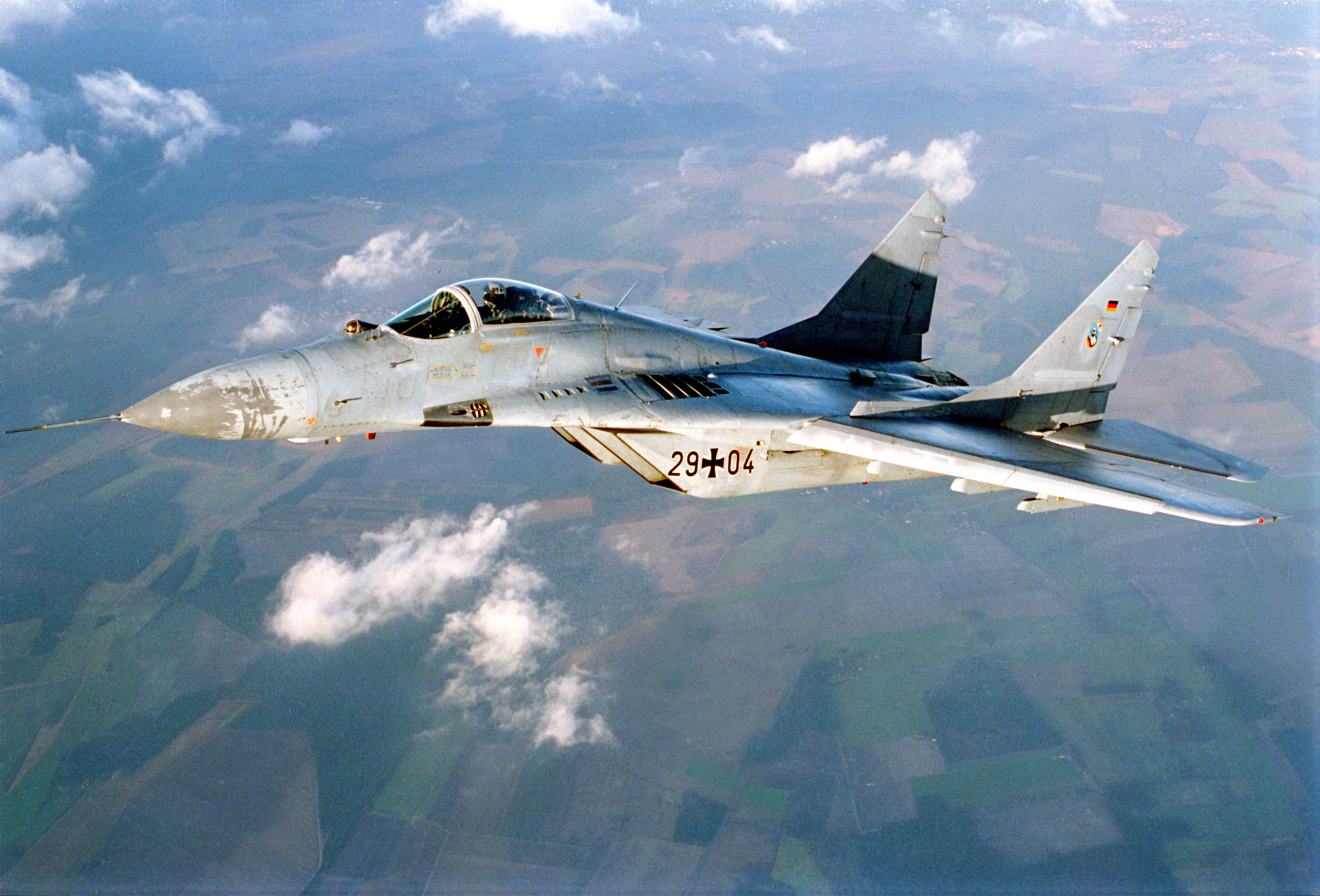
A Luftwaffe MiG-29

After German reunification in October 1990, the aircraft and personnel of the former GDR air force, the Luftstreitkräfte der NVA were taken. The remnants of the East German Air Force were placed under the newly formed 5th Air Force Division (5. Luftwaffendivision) in Strausberg. In 1993, the division was renamed 3rd Air Force Division (3. Luftwaffendivision), moved to Gatow in Berlin and in 1995 assigned to NATO. By 1990, the East German plane markings had been replaced by the Air Force Iron Cross, the first time Soviet-built aircraft had served in a NATO air force. However, as the Luftstreitkräfte der NVA were supplied exclusively with Eastern Bloc-produced aircraft, such as the Sukhoi Su-17, MiG-21, MiG-23 and MiG-29 fighters, most of the equipment was not compatible with the West German NATO equipment and therefore taken out of service and sold or given to new members of NATO in Eastern Europe, such as Poland and the Baltic states.

An exception to this was the Fighter Wing 3 "Vladimir Komarov " (Jagdfliegergeschwader 3 " Vladimir Komarov ") in Preschen Air Base. The Fighter Wing 3 flew brand new MiG-29 fighters. On 1 June 1993, the wing was renamed Fighter Wing 73 (Jagdgeschwader 73) and on 1 October 1994 completed its move to its new home at Laage Air Base. The pilots of JG 73 were some of the most experienced MiG-29 pilots in the world. One of their primary duties was to serve as aggressor pilots, training other pilots in dissimilar combat tactics. The United States sent a group of fighter pilots to Germany during the Red October exercise to practise tactics against the aircraft they were most likely to meet in real combat. The MiG-29s of JG 73 were fully integrated into the Luftwaffe's air defence structure and the first Soviet Bloc aircraft to be declared operational within NATO. With the introduction of the Eurofighter Typhoon imminent, the decision was taken to withdraw the MiG-29. All German MiG-29s, save one, were sold to Poland for the symbolic price of €1 apiece. On 9 August 2004, the last MiG-29s landed in Poland where they continue to serve in the 41st Tactical Squadron of the Polish Air Force.

=== Operations in the Balkans ===
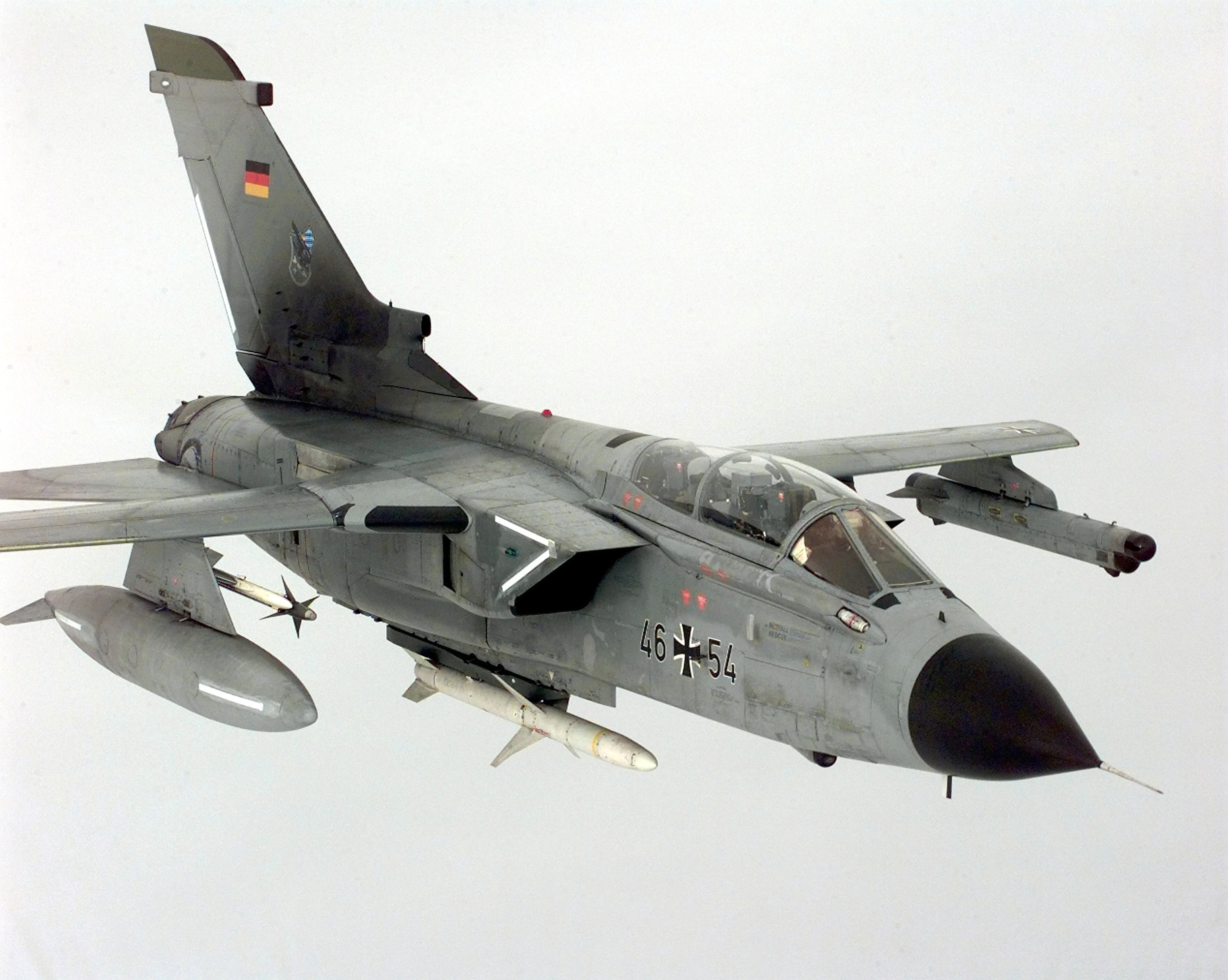
A Luftwaffe Tornado ECR carrying an AGM-88-HARM missile during the air campaign over Kosovo in 1999

The Luftwaffe experienced combat action for the first time since World War II during September 1995 in the course of Operation Deliberate Force, when six IDS Tornado fighter-bombers, equipped with forward looking infrared devices, and escorted by eight ECR Tornados, supported NATO's artillery missions on positions of the Bosnian Serbs around Sarajevo, Bosnia & Herzegovina.

In March 1999, the Luftwaffe became involved in a direct combat role as part of the Kosovo War along with the other NATO powers. This event was noted as significant in the British press with The Sun running the headline "Luftwaffe and the RAF into battle side by side". The Luftwaffe sent in Fighter Bomber Wing 32, equipped with ECR Tornados, which flew missions to suppress enemy air defenses in and around Kosovo.

These fighter-bombers were equipped with an electronic countermeasures pod, one AIM-9 Sidewinder air-to-air missile for self-defence, and an AGM-88 HARM air-to-ground missile (anti-radar). The bomber wing flew 2108 hours and 446 sorties, firing 236 HARM missiles at hostile targets. No crewed Luftwaffe planes were lost in combat during this campaign.

=== 2000s ===
In 2005 and 2008, Luftwaffe F-4F Phantom II fighter planes took part in the Baltic Air Policing operation (of NATO), and these fighters were supplemented in 2009 by units flying the Typhoon.

In 2006, to support military operations in Afghanistan, the Luftwaffe sent over several Panavia Tornado reconnaissance planes from the 51st Reconnaissance Wing "Immelmann" (Aufklärungsgeschwader 51 "Immelmann"), stationed in Mazar-i-Sharif, Northern Afghanistan. There have also been assorted German Army helicopters flying from the Luftwaffe Air Base in Mazar-i-Sharif. Also, Luftwaffe C-160 Transall have flown transport plane missions in and around Afghanistan.

Since the 1970s, the West German (and, post-reunification, German) Luftwaffe (as well as many other European air forces) has actively pursued the construction of European internationally made warplanes, such as the Panavia Tornado and the Eurofighter Typhoon introduced into the Luftwaffe in 2006.

On 13 January 2004, the Minister of Defence, Peter Struck, announced major changes in the future of the German armed forces. A major part of this announcement was a plan to cut the number of fighter planes from 426 in early 2004, to 265 by 2015. Assuming that the plans to order 180 Typhoons is carried out in full, and all of the F-4 Phantoms are removed from service, this would cut the number of Tornado fighter-bombers down to just 85.

In the past, the Bundesmarine's naval air wing (Marineflieger) received 112 Tornado IDS planes. However, in late 2004, the last unit of Bundesmarine Tornados was disbanded. The entire maritime combat role was assigned to the Luftwaffe, one unit of which has had its Tornado fighters equipped to carry Kormoran II missiles and American HARM missiles.

=== 2010s ===
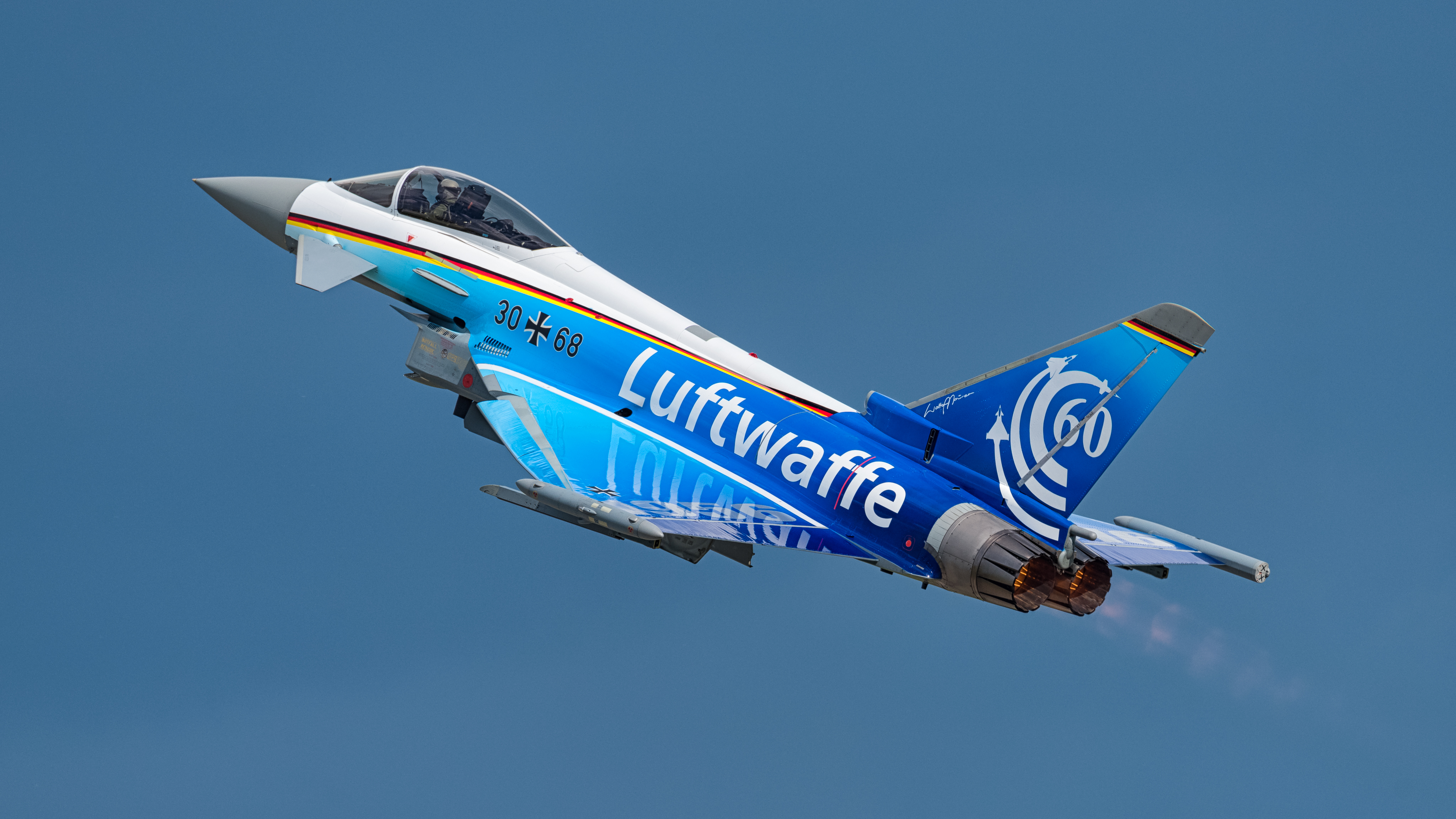
A Luftwaffe Eurofighter Typhoon 30+68 with the painting "60 years of Luftwaffe", 2016

As of 2014, a significant proportion of Germany's military aircraft was reported to be unserviceable. It was reported that around half of the Eurofighters and Tornados were not currently airworthy and that the aging C-160 fleet remained in limited service while awaiting the introduction of the Airbus A400M, the first of which was delivered in December 2014. Ursula von der Leyen admitted that, due to the poor state of the Bundeswehr's equipment, Germany was no longer able to fulfill its NATO commitments.

The German Air Force was one of the founding members of the European Air Transport Command headquartered in Eindhoven - The Netherlands and most of the Transport & Tanker assets have been transferred under EATC management. The replacement of four Airbus A310 MRTT by the Airbus A330 MRTT was approved in 2018 by joining the acquisition of four by the Royal Netherlands Air Force.

Future plans are the replacement of the aging Sikorsky CH-53 Sea Stallion, which was acquired in the 1970s, by Boeing CH-47 Chinook or Sikorsky CH-53K King Stallion. A bid for a heavy transport helicopter program or STH (Schwerer Transporthubschrauber) was initiated in 2018. However, the award was suspended in 2020 due to the high price tag on both helicopters.

The Luftwaffe participated in the Israeli Air Force exercise "Blue Flag", the country's largest international air combat exercise, designed to simulate extreme combat scenarios. The German Air Force's six Eurofighter Typhoon fighter jets were from Tactical Air Force Squadron 73 Steinhoff from Rostock. It is the first German participation in the Blue Flag exercise.

In 2018, the Air Force issued a request for information from manufacturers about four potential aircraft to replace the aging Panavia Tornados - the Eurofighter Typhoon, F-15 Advanced Eagle, F/A-18E/F Super Hornet and F-35 Lightning. In January 2019, it was announced that the F-35 Lightning had been dropped from the shortlist, with the Eurofighter Typhoon and Boeing F/A-18E/F Super Hornet under consideration.

The German Air Force will acquire three C-130J Super Hercules Transport and three KC-130J Tanker Aircraft (delivery planned 2020–2021), which will be jointly operated with the French Air Force's two C-130J and two KC-130J Aircraft (delivery planned 2018–19).

=== 2020s ===
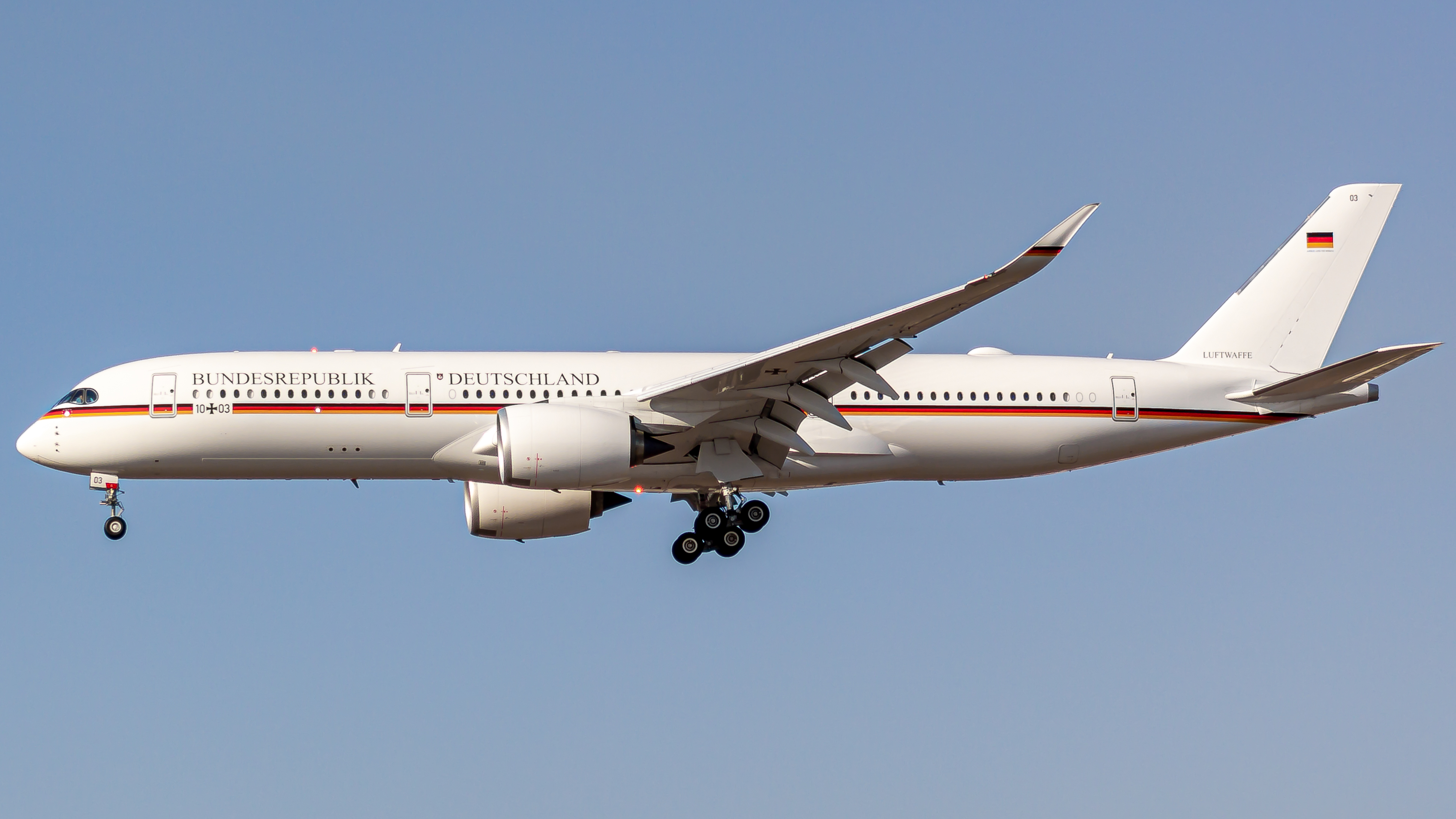
The first new Luftwaffe Airbus A350-900 in Los Angeles

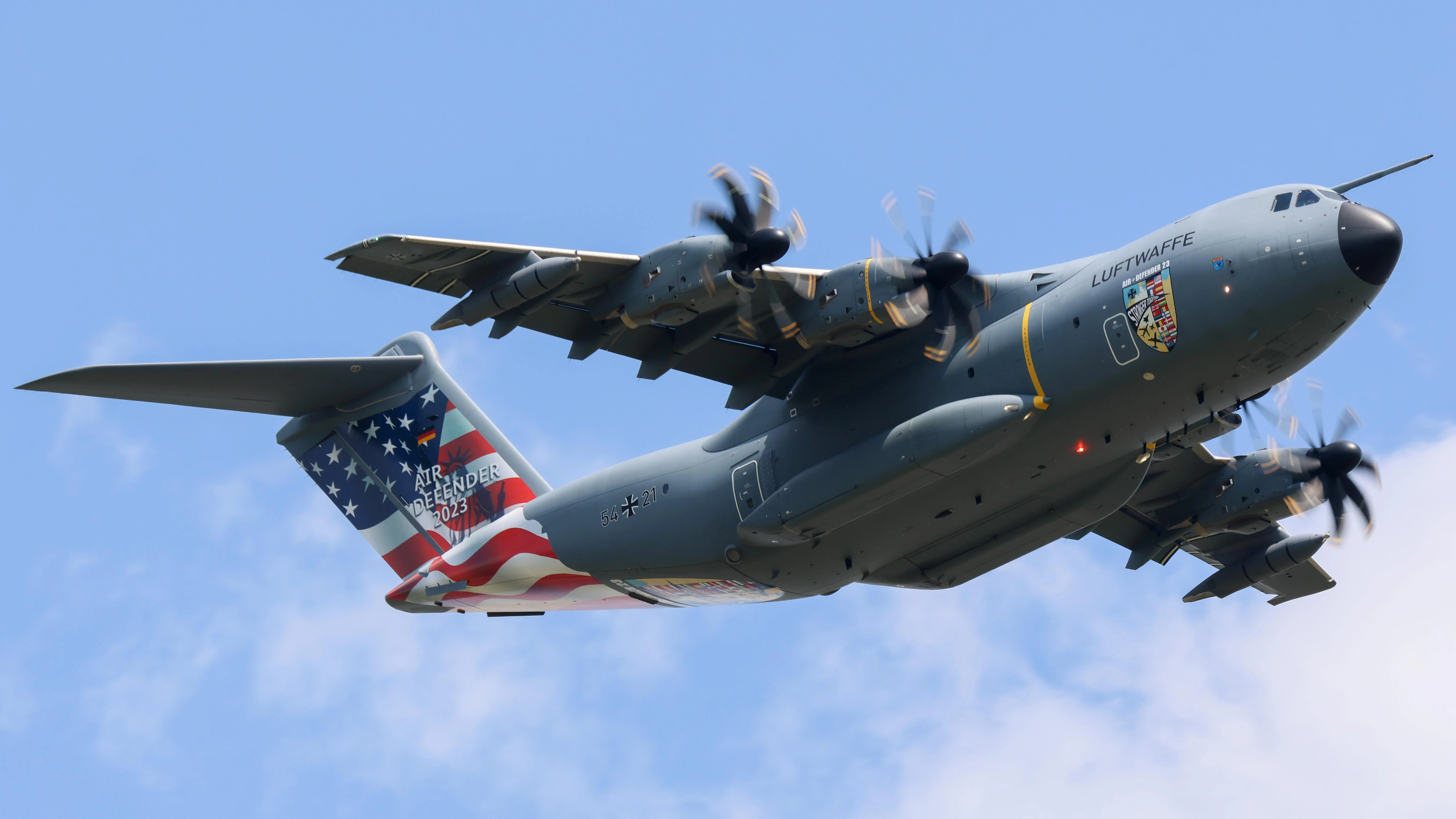
Luftwaffe A400M "54+21" Air Defender 23 livery

In April 2020, the German government announced its intention to gain approval for the purchase of 30 Boeing F/A-18E/F Super Hornets, 15 EA-18G Growlers, and 55 Eurofighter Typhoons as replacements for the Tornado fleet. However, as of the same month such approval was unlikely to occur before 2022. The Super Hornet was selected due to its compatibility with nuclear weapons and availability of an electronic attack version. As of March 2022, the Super Hornet has not been certified for the B61 Mod 12 nuclear bombs, but Dan Gillian, head of Boeing's Super Hornet program, previously stated that "We certainly think that we, working with the U.S. government, can meet the German requirements there on the [German's] timeline."

In December 2021, Air Transport Wing 63 in Hohn Air Base and with it, the last remaining German C-160 Transalls were disbanded, with the A400M and C-130J serving as the German tactical transport aircraft in the future.

In March 2022, German Minister of Defence Christine Lambrecht announced that Germany intends to buy 35 Lockheed Martin F-35A Lightning II fighter jets instead of Super Hornets to replace the Tornado, the only aircraft Germany possess capable of carrying US nuclear weapons. Another ten may be added to the initial order. Germany intends to also order 15 Eurofighter Typhoon electronic warfare aircraft in place of Growlers.

In April 2022, as a continuation of the STH program, Germany has chosen the CH-47F Chinook to replace its aging fleet of Sikorsky CH-53 Sea Stallion. According to Reuters report, Germany will purchase 60 CH-47Fs with a contract worth around €5 billion (US$5.40 billion).

In August 2022, Germany sent six Eurofighter Typhoon fighter jets, three Airbus A330 MRTT tankers and four Airbus A400M Atlas transports to take part in Exercise Pitch Black in Australia, in the air force's largest peacetime deployment.

From 12 to 23 June 2023, the German Air Force hosted Air Defender 23, the largest exercise of NATO air forces since its creation with 25 nations and up to 10,000 troops participating.

The military use of space is a standing operational task of the Luftwaffe and includes tasks such as establishing situational awareness for the space domain, planning and conduct of space operations as well as protection and military control of the operation of all space systems in the Bundeswehr Space Command, under the space domain responsibility of the Luftwaffe. Consequently, with the publication of the German Space Safety and Security Strategy in November 2026, the German Air Force was rebranded to "German Air and Space Force".

== Structure ==
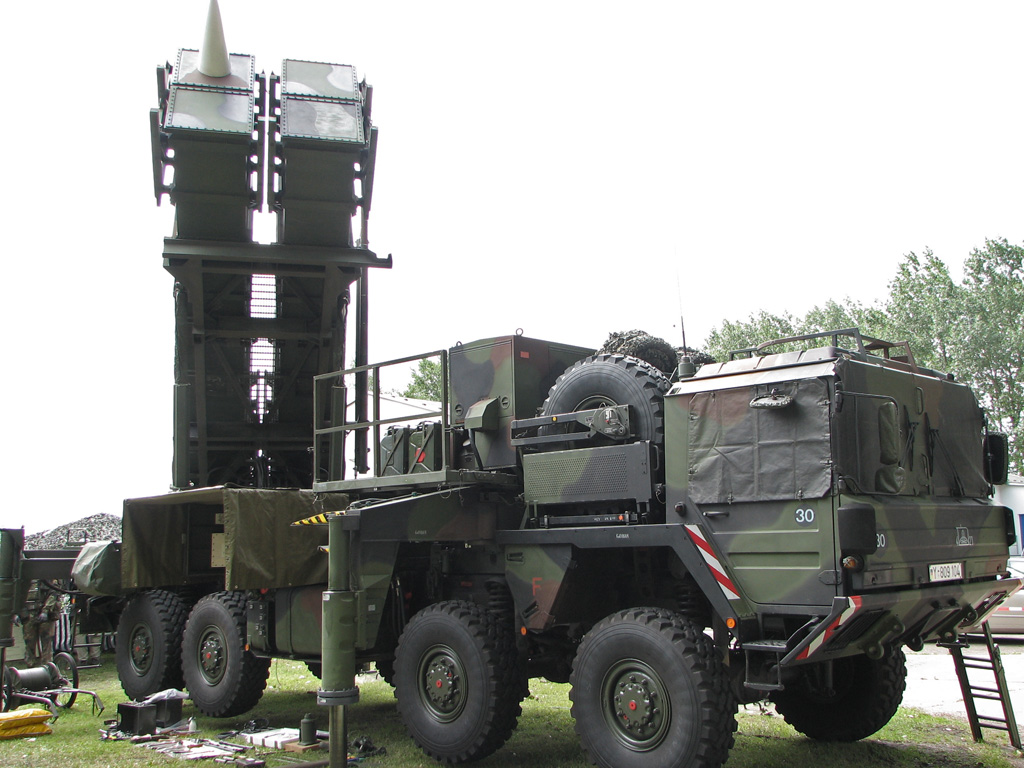
A German Air Force MIM-104 Patriot system

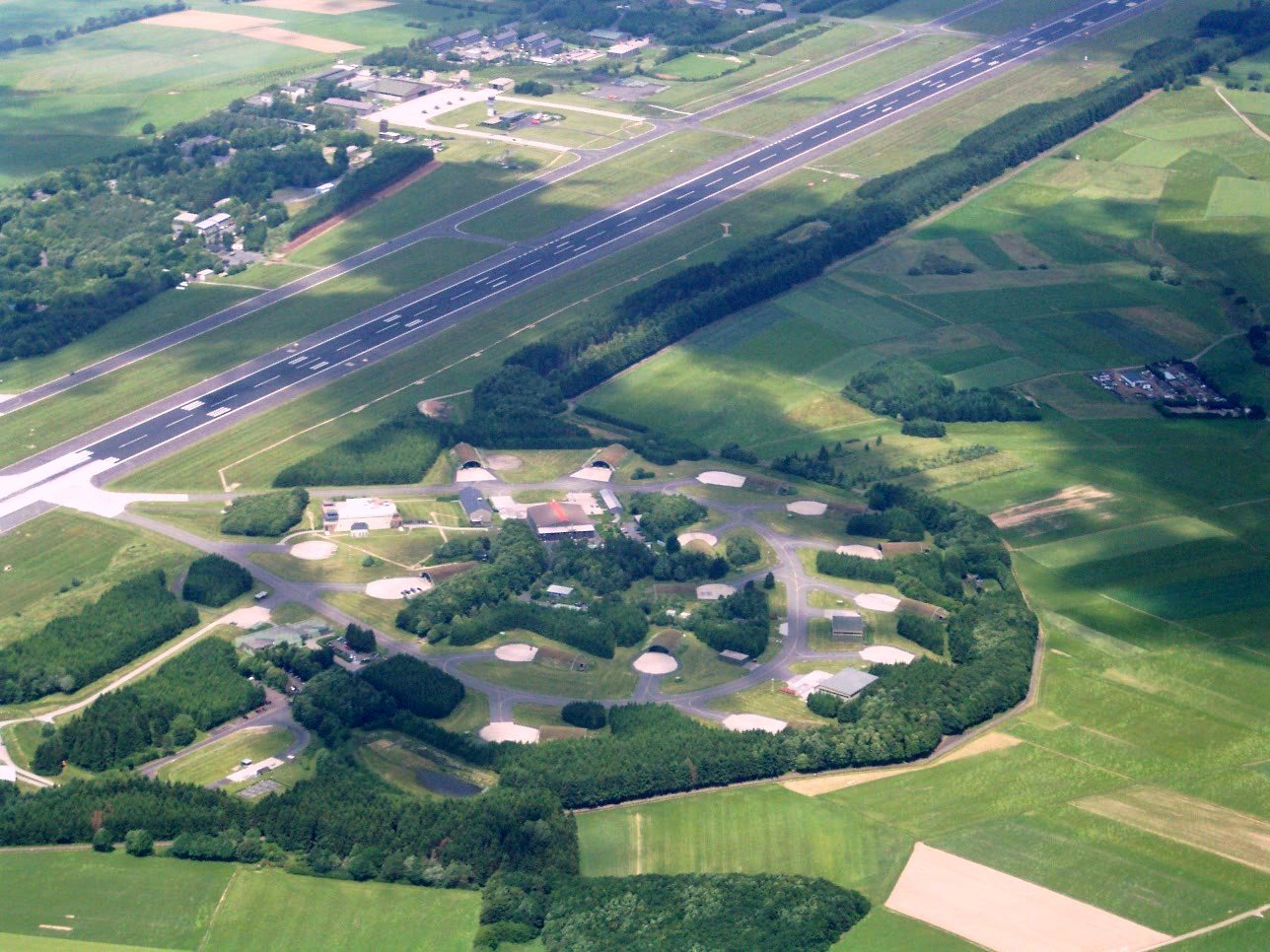
Büchel Air Base

The current commander of the German Air and Space Force is Lieutenant General Holger Neumann. The Inspector of the Air Force (Inspekteur der Luftwaffe) is the commander of Air Force Command (Kommando Luftwaffe), a body created in 2013 by the merger of the Air Force Office (Luftwaffenamt), German Air Staff (Führungsstab der Luftwaffe), and Air Force Forces Command (Luftwaffenführungskommando). Similar to the Air Staff of the United States Air Force, the German Air Force Command is a force-providing command, not an operational command. The Air Force Command is tasked with ensuring the combat readiness of the German Air Force combat units, which during operations would either be commanded by a NATO command or the Joint Operations Command of the Bundeswehr. The Air Force command directly controls three higher commands.

The creation of the Air Force Command was part of a reorganization of the Bundeswehr as a whole, announced by Thomas de Maizière in 2011, which also involved the Air Force shrinking to 23,000 soldiers and thus undergoing major restructuring at all levels. In addition to the higher command authorities, the three air divisions, the Air Force Training Command, and Air Force Weapon Systems Command were disbanded. The three surface-to-air missile units will merge into a single wing in Husum in Northern Germany. The wing fields 14 MIM-104 Patriot and 4 MANTIS systems. The three air transport wings will be merged into a single wing based at Wunstorf Air Base, which will field 40 A400M Atlas transport planes. The Luftwaffe will field three Multirole Eurofighter Wings, each with two squadrons for a total of 143 Eurofighter Typhoon. A fighter-bomber wing fielding Panavia Tornado IDS planes remains in service at Büchel Air Base. The Reconnaissance Wing 51 will remain in service at Schleswig Air Base and add one drone squadron to its Panavia Tornado ECR squadron.

The Kommando Luftwaffe has two main elements subordinate to it:

- Air Operations Command (Zentrum Luftoperationen der Luftwaffe), responsible for providing command and control to air operations
- Air Force Forces Command (Luftwaffentruppenkommando)

Individual Air Force units are either part of the Air Force Operational Forces Command or the Support Forces Command. They only fall under the command of the Air Operations Command when on deployment or attached to EU or NATO organizations.

In 2021 also Space Component Command (Weltraumkommando der Bundeswehr) was created.

=== Air Operations Command ===
German Air Force radar stations, and control and reporting centers:
Radar station with HADR
Radar station with TRL-4D LR
GM 406F radar station
RRP-117 radar station
Control and Reporting Center

The main subordinate elements of the Air Operations Command are:

- Air Operations Center (NATO CAOC Uedem), in Uedem, responsible for NATO's Integrated Air Defense System North of the Alps
  - Air Force Support Group (Luftwaffenunterstützungsgruppe), in Kalkar
  - Control and Reporting Center 2 (Einsatzführungsbereich 2), in Erndtebrück
    - Operations Squadron 21, in Erndtebrück
    - Operations Support Squadron 22, in Erndtebrück
      - Sensor Platoon I, in Lauda
        - Remote Radar Post 240 "Loneship", in Erndtebrück with GM 406F
        - Remote Radar Post 246 "Hardwheel", on Erbeskopf with HADR (being replaced by TRL-4D LR)
        - Remote Radar Post 247 "Batman", in Lauda with GM 406F
        - Remote Radar Post 248 "Coldtrack", in Freising with GM 406F
        - Remote Radar Post 249 "Sweet Apple", in Meßstetten with HADR (being replaced by TRL-4D LR)
      - Sensor Platoon II, in Auenhausen
        - Remote Radar Post 241 "Crabtree", in Marienbaum with HADR (being replaced by TRL-4D LR)
        - Remote Radar Post 242 "Backwash", in Auenhausen with GM 406F
        - Remote Radar Post 243 "Silver Cork", in Visselhövede with GM 406F
        - Remote Radar Post 244 "Round up", in Brockzetel with TRL-4D LR
        - Remote Radar Post 245 "Bugle", in Brekendorf with GM 406F
    - Control and Reporting Training Inspection 23, in Erndtebrück
      - Education and Training Center, in Erndtebrück
      - Education, Test and Training Group, in Erndtebrück
  - Control and Reporting Center 3 (Einsatzführungsbereich 3), in Schönewalde
    - Operations Squadron 31, in Schönewalde
    - Operations Support Squadron 32, in Schönewalde
      - Sensor Platoon III, in Cölpin
        - Remote Radar Post 351 "Matchpoint", in Putgarten with RRP-117
        - Remote Radar Post 352 "Mindreader", in Cölpin with RRP-117
        - Remote Radar Post 353 "Teddy Bear", in Tempelhof with RRP-117
        - Remote Radar Post 356 "", in Elmenhorst with RRP-117
      - Sensor Platoon IV, in Regen
        - Remote Radar Post 354 "Blackmoor", in Döbern with RRP-117
        - Remote Radar Post 355 "Royal Flash", in Gleina with RRP-117
        - Remote Radar Post 357 "", on Döbraberg with RRP-117
        - Remote Radar Post 358 "Snow Cap", on Großer Arber with RRP-117
    - Deployable Control and Reporting Centre, in Schönewalde
  - Air Force Command Support Center (Führungsunterstützungszentrum der Luftwaffe), in Köln-Wahn
  - German Representation at NATO's Allied Air Command, at Ramstein Air Base
  - German Representation at Joint Air Power Competence Centre, in Kalkar
  - German Representation at European Air Transport Command, in Eindhoven Air Base
  - German Representation at NATO Airborne Early Warning & Control Force Command, at NATO Air Base Geilenkirchen
  - German Representation at Alliance Ground Surveillance, in Sigonella Air Base

=== Air Force Forces Command ===
The main subordinate elements of the Air Force Operational Forces Command are:

Directly subordinated institutions:

- Air Force Air and Space Medicine Center, at Köln-Wahn Air Base

Subordinated flying units:

- Tactical Air Force Wing 31 "Boelcke", at Nörvenich Air Base, with Eurofighter Typhoon
- Tactical Air Force Wing 33, at Büchel Air Base, with Tornado IDS
- Tactical Air Force Wing 51 "Immelmann", at Schleswig Air Base, with Tornado IDS/ECR
  - Tornado flight training returned from Holloman AFB, USA to Schleswig-Jagel as a squadron under the Immelmann Wing
- Tactical Air Force Wing 71 "Richthofen", at Wittmundhafen Air Base, with Eurofighter Typhoon
- Tactical Air Force Wing 73 "Steinhoff", at Laage Air Base, with Eurofighter Typhoon (Typhoon OCU)
- Tactical Air Force Wing 74, at Neuburg Air Base, with Eurofighter Typhoon
- Air Transport Wing 62, at Wunstorf Air Base with A400M Atlas
- Helicopter Wing 64, at Laupheim Air Base and Holzdorf Air Base
  - Flying Group, at Laupheim Air Base with CH-53 Sea Stallion and H145M LUH SOF
  - Air Transport Group, at Holzdorf Air Base with CH-53 Sea Stallion
- Executive Transport Wing, at Köln-Wahn Airport
  - 1st Air Transport Squadron at Köln-Wahn Airport with Airbus A330 MRTT
  - 2nd Air Transport Squadron at Köln-Wahn Airport with A340-300 VIP, Airbus A321, A319CJ, Global 5000 and
  - 3rd Air Transport Squadron at Berlin-Tegel Airport with AS532 U2 Cougar
- Air Force Tactical Training Command USA, Sheppard AFB, Texas
  - German Representation at Euro NATO Joint Jet Pilot Training, Sheppard AFB, Texas with T-6 Texan II and T-38C Talon
  - German Air Force Training Squadron 2, at NAS Pensacola, Florida
  - German Air Force Training Squadron 3, at Phoenix Goodyear Airport, Arizona
- Electronic Warfare Flying Weapon Systems Center, in Kleinaitingen

Subordinated ground based units:

- Air Defence Missile Wing 1 "Schleswig-Holstein", in Husum Air Base
  - Air Defence Missile Group 21, in Sanitz and Prangendorf with MIM-104 Patriot
  - Air Defence Missile Group 24, in Bad Sülze with MIM-104 Patriot
  - Air Defence Missile Group 26, in Husum Air Base with MIM-104 Patriot
  - Air Defence Missile Group 61, in Todendorf with MANTIS (assigned since April 2018 to the Royal Netherlands Army's Joint Ground-based Air Defence Command)
  - Air Defence Missiles Tactical Training and Instruction Center, in Fort Bliss, Texas
  - Air Defence Missiles Training Center, in Husum
- Air Force Regiment "Friesland", at Jever Air Base
  - I Battalion (Infantry), at Jever Air Base
  - II Battalion (Logistics, Sappers, Firefighters), at Diepholz Air Base
  - III Battalion (Reserve infantry), at Jever Air Base
- Air Force Officer School, in Fürstenfeldbruck
- Air Force Non-Commissioned Officer School, in Appen and Heide
- Air Force Training Battalion, in Germersheim
- Air Force Support Group, at Köln-Wahn Air Base

Subordinated support units:

- Weapon System Support Center 1, at Erding Air Base
  - Maintenance Center 11, at Erding Air Base
  - Maintenance Center 12, in Ummendorf
  - Maintenance Center 13, at Landsberg/Lech Air Base
  - Maintenance Center 14, at Ingolstadt/Manching Air Base
- Weapon System Support Center 2, at Diepholz Air Base
  - Maintenance Center 21, at Diepholz Air Base (will move to Holzdorf Air Base)
  - Maintenance Center 23, at Wunstorf Air Base
  - Maintenance Center 24, at Trollenhagen Air Base (will move to Laage Air Base)
  - Maintenance Center 25, in Erndtebrück
  - Maintenance Center 26, at Wunstorf Air Base
- Air Force Technical Training Center, at Faßberg Air Base
  - Air Force Technical Training Center North, at Faßberg Air Base
  - Air Force Technical Training Center South, at Kaufbeuren Air Base
  - Air Force Professional College, at Faßberg Air Base
- German Representation at the NATO Programming Center, in Glons, Belgium

=== North American training centers ===
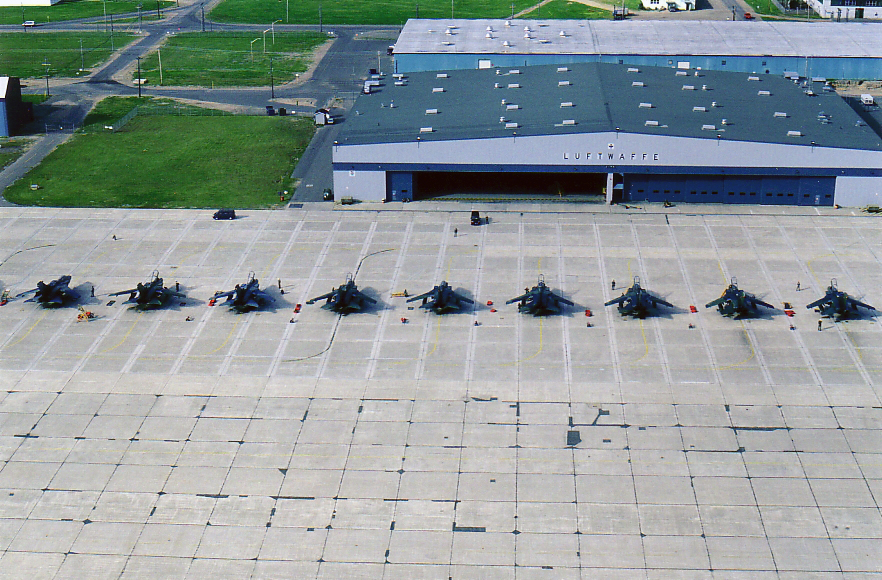
Luftwaffe Panavia Tornados at CFB Goose Bay

In light of the destroyed infrastructure of West Germany post–World War II, the restrictions on aircraft production placed on Germany and the later restrictive flying zones available for training pilots, the reconstructed Luftwaffe trained most of its pilots tactically away from Germany, mainly in the United States and Canada where most of its aircraft were sourced.

During the 1960s and 1970s, a very large number of Luftwaffe jet crashes—the Luftwaffe suffered a 36 percent crash rate for F-84F Thunderstreaks and an almost 30 percent loss of F-104 Starfighters—created considerable public demand for moving Luftwaffe combat training centers away from Germany.

As a result, the Luftwaffe set up two tactical training centers: one, like those of many of the NATO forces, at the Royal Canadian Air Force base at Goose Bay; and the second in a unique partnership with the United States Air Force at Holloman Air Force Base in New Mexico (F-104 pilots had already been trained at Luke Air Force Base, Arizona, since 1964). Both facilities provide access to large unpopulated areas, where tactical and combat training can take place without danger to large populations.

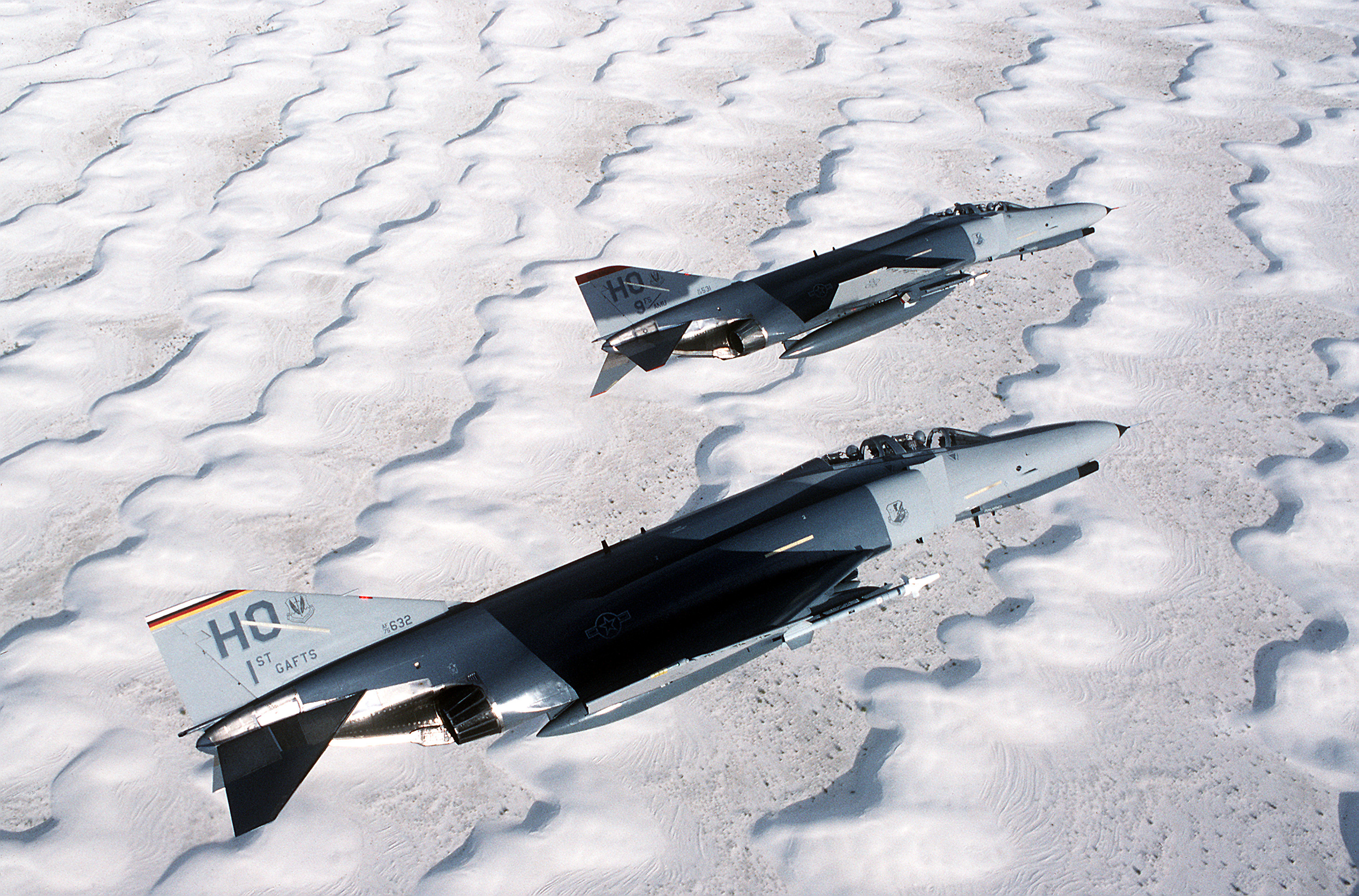
F-4Es of the 1st GAFTS

On 1 May 1996, the Luftwaffe established the German Air Force Tactical Training Center (TTC) in concert with the United States Air Force 20th Fighter Squadron at Holloman Air Force Base in New Mexico, which provides aircrew training in the F-4F Phantom II. The TTC served as the parent command for two German aircrew training squadrons. The F-4 Training Squadron oversaw all German F-4 student personnel affairs and provided German instructor pilots to cooperate in the contracted F-4 training program provided by the U.S. Air Force (20th Fighter Squadron). A second TTC unit, the Tornado Training Squadron, provided academic and tactical flying training, by German air force instructors, for German Tornado aircrews.

The first contingent of Tornado aircraft arrived at Holloman in March 1996. More than 300 German air force personnel were permanently assigned at Holloman to the TTC, the only unit of its kind in the United States. The German Air Force Flying Training Center was activated on 31 March 1996, with German Air Force Chief of Staff Gen. Portz and U.S. Air Force Chief of Staff Gen. Michael Ryan present. The Luftwaffe had stationed up to 800 personnel at Holloman for training exercises, due to limited training space in Europe.

In September 2004, the Luftwaffe announced a reduction in its training program by about 20%. By the end of 2006, 650 Luftwaffe personnel and 25 Tornado aircraft were assigned to Holloman.

On 12 April 2016, the Ministry of Defence decided to close the TTC by 2019 to consolidate the reduced operation of remaining Tornado aircraft in Germany. Approximately 450 personnel and 14 Tornado aircraft were stationed Holloman at the time. Training for the Tornado transitioned to the Tactical Air Force Wing 51 "Immelmann" at Schleswig Air Base and the remaining Air Force Tactical Training Command USA relocated to Sheppard Air Force Base by December 2019.

== Air bases ==
In 2020, the Air Force uses 12 air bases, four of which host no flying units. Furthermore, the Air Force has a presence at three civilian airports including Berlin Tegel airport which was closed in November 2020:

Name	Major Tenants	ICAO-Code	IATA-Code	Runways Code			Year	Nearest City	State
Name	Major Tenants	ICAO-Code	IATA-Code	Direction	Cover	Size	Year	Nearest City	State
Berlin Tegel Airport	Executive Transport Wing; only helicopters because the runways are decommissioned	EDDT	TXL	08L/26R	Asphalt	3022x45	1948	Berlin	Berlin
Berlin Tegel Airport	Executive Transport Wing; only helicopters because the runways are decommissioned	EDDT	TXL	08R/26L	Asphalt	2427x45	1948	Berlin	Berlin
Büchel Air Base	Tactical Wing 33	ETSB	–	03/21	Asphalt	2507x45	1955	Büchel	Rhineland-Palatinate
Cologne Bonn Airport	Executive Transport Wing	EDDK	CGN	14L/32R	Asphalt	3815x60	1938	Cologne	North Rhine-Westphalia
Cologne Bonn Airport	Executive Transport Wing	EDDK	CGN	06/24	Concrete	2459x45	1938	Cologne	North Rhine-Westphalia
Cologne Bonn Airport	Executive Transport Wing	EDDK	CGN	14R/32L	Asphalt	1863x45	1938	Cologne	North Rhine-Westphalia
Diepholz Air Base	–	ETND	–	08/26	Asphalt	1283x45	1936	Diepholz	Lower Saxony
Hohn Air Base	Reserve airfield for Tactical Wing 51, formerly Air Transport Wing 63	ETNH	–	08/26	Concrete	2440x30		Hohn	Schleswig-Holstein
Holzdorf Air Base	Helicopter Wing 64	ETSH	–	09/27	Asphalt	2419x30	1974	Holzdorf	Saxony-Anhalt
Landsberg-Lech Air Base	Reserve airfield for Tactical Wing 74	ETSA	–	07/25	Concrete	2066x30	1935	Landsberg	Bavaria
Laupheim Air Base	Helicopter Wing 64	ETHL	–	09/27	Asphalt	1646x30	1940	Laupheim	Baden-Württemberg
Lechfeld Air Base	Second A400M wing to be formed.	ETSL	–	03/21	Concrete	2678x30	1912	Klosterlechfeld	Bavaria
Neuburg Air Base	Tactical Wing 74	ETSN	–	09/27	Asphalt	2440x30	1960	Neuburg	Bavaria
Nörvenich Air Base	Tactical Wing 31	ETNN	QOE	07/25	Asphalt	2439x45	1954	Nörvenich	North Rhine-Westphalia
Rostock-Laage Airport	Tactical Wing 73	ETNL	RLG	10/28	Concrete	2500x45	1984	Laage	Mecklenburg-Vorpommern
Schleswig Air Base	Tactical Wing 51	ETNS	WBG	05/23	Asphalt	2439x30		Schleswig	Schleswig-Holstein
Wittmundhafen Air Base	Tactical Wing 71	ETNT	–	08/26	Asphalt	2440x30	1951	Wittmund	Lower Saxony
Wunstorf Air Base	Air Transport Wing 62	ETNW	–	08/26	Asphalt	1877x46,5	1936	Wunstorf	Lower Saxony
Wunstorf Air Base	Air Transport Wing 62	ETNW	–	03/21	Asphalt	1699x47,5	1936	Wunstorf	Lower Saxony
Wunstorf Air Base	Air Transport Wing 62	ETNW	–	08/26	Grass	1088x40	1936	Wunstorf	Lower Saxony

German Air Force bases:
Eurofighter Tornado IDS Tornado ECR & IDS
A400M Atlas C-160 Transall CH-53 Sea Stallion VIP Transport
Air Force Regiment Air Defence Missile Wing 1 Bases without flying units

== Personnel ==
In 2012, the Air Force had an authorized strength of 44,565 active airmen and 4,914 reservists. The civil personnel within the Air Force is being reduced to 5,950 officials and employees. Most of the civilian employees work in maintenance and the Air Force Fire Department. On 20 September 2011 defense minister Thomas de Maizière announced that the Air Force would shrink to 23,000 airmen.

=== Training ===
The Luftwaffe has set up a total of 5 training institutions, namely the Offizierschule der Luftwaffe, Unteroffizierschule der Luftwaffe, Luftwaffenausbildungsbataillon, Fachschule der Luftwaffe and Technische Ausbildungszentrum der Luftwaffe, for training catering both personnel in active service and civilians willing to enter the Luftwaffe.

== Symbols, emblems and uniform ==
=== Roundel and serial number ===
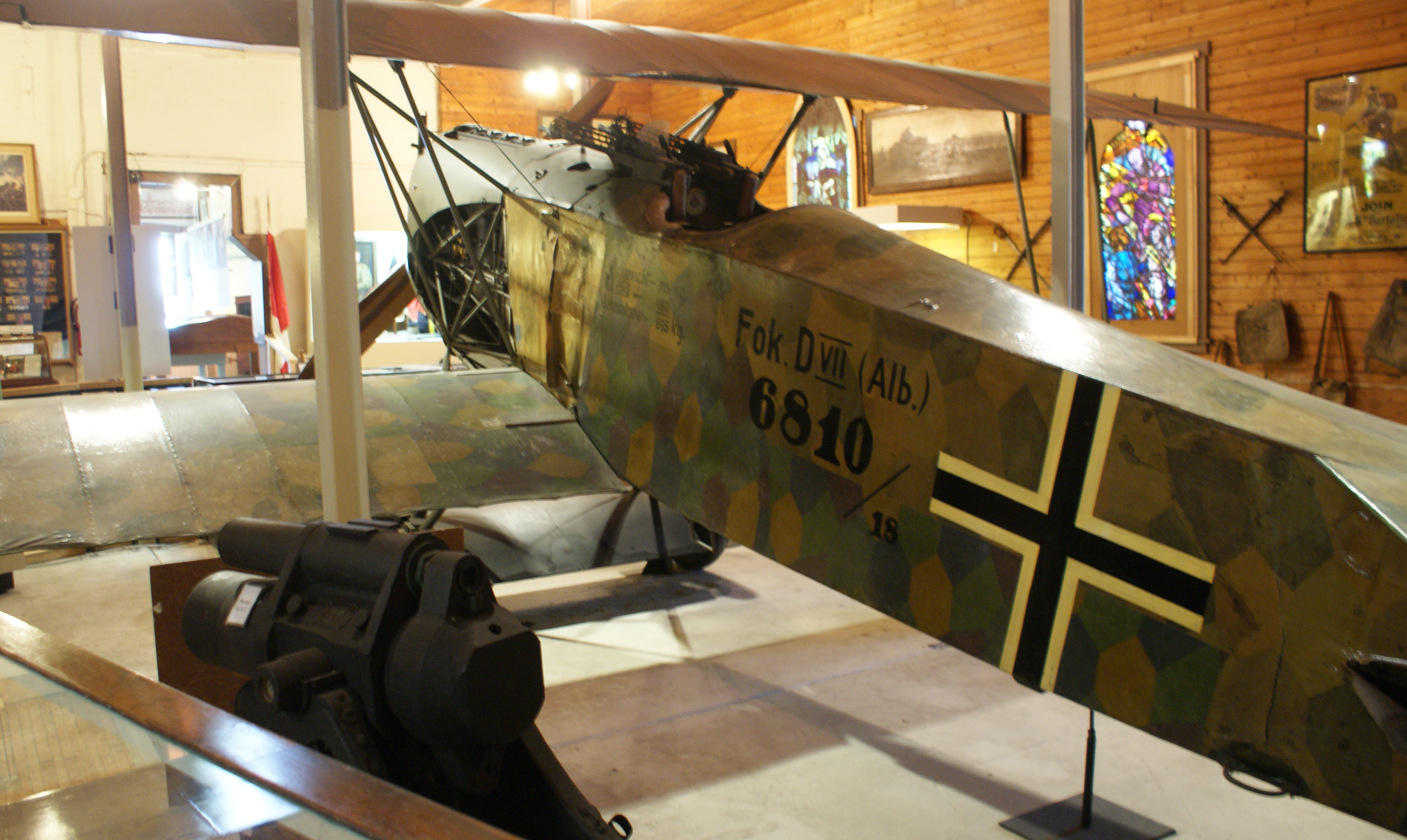
A preserved Fokker D.VII with the original-style Balkenkreuz of 1918

Originally German Air Force aircraft carried an Iron Cross—appearing to be closely modeled on that used by the 1916–17 era Imperial German Luftstreitkräfte through the spring of 1918, but no longer have the white border around the crosses' "ends" (thusly resembling the orthogonal white "flanks" of the earlier, 1918–1945 era Balkenkreuz national marking)—as an identifying feature on all four wing positions and on both sides on the rear of the fuselage and a small tricolor German flag painted on the vertical stabilizer. Each aircraft also carried a serial number consisting of two letters, which identified the service and combat wing, followed by three numbers identifying the squadron and the number of the plane within the squadron, almost graphically resembling the USAF's own buzz numbers of the same period.

This system was changed in 1968. The large Iron Cross and serial numbers have since been replaced on all aircraft by a four-digit registration code, marked on the aircraft somewhat in the manner of the earlier alphanumeric Geschwaderkennung combat wing code characters used by their World War II predecessor—separated by an Iron Cross in the middle: the first pair of numbers identify the type of aircraft and the second pair are sequential for each type. For example, the Tornado IDS of the Air Force are numbered from 4301 to 4622, while the Tornado ECR of the Air Force is numbered from 4623 to 4657 and the numbers from 3001 to 3399 are being used for the Eurofighter. The 4-digit serial number is often portrayed in print with a "+" between the two pairs of numbers as a placeholder to indicate where the Iron Cross would separate the numbers when painted on the aircraft, for example the new A350 fleet (1001 to 1003) can be written as "10+01", etc.

=== Uniform ===
The ranks of the Air Force are identical to the ranks of the German Army. The Air Force field dress is the same as the army field dress. The dress uniform of the Air Force is dark blue with gold-yellow wings as collar patches. As headdress a dark blue side cap or dark blue peaked cap can be worn. Members of the German Air Force Regiment wear a dark blue beret.

=== Ranks ===
==== Commissioned officer ranks ====
The rank insignia of commissioned officers.

NATO code	OF-10	OF-9	OF-8	OF-7	OF-6	OF-5	OF-4	OF-3	OF-2		OF-1
German Air Force
German Air Force		General	Generalleutnant	Generalmajor	Brigadegeneral	Oberst	Oberstleutnant	Major	Stabshauptmann	Hauptmann	Oberleutnant	Leutnant

==== Other ranks ====
The rank insignia of non-commissioned officers and enlisted personnel.

NATO code	OR-9	OR-8	OR-7	OR-6		OR-5		OR-4				OR-3		OR-2	OR-1
German Air Force
German Air Force	Oberstabsfeldwebel	Stabsfeldwebel	Hauptfeldwebel	Oberfeldwebel	Feldwebel	Stabsunteroffizier	Unteroffizier	Stabskorporal	Korporal	Oberstabsgefreiter	Stabsgefreiter	Hauptgefreiter	Obergefreiter	Gefreiter	Flieger
German Air Force (Officer designate)
German Air Force (Officer designate)			Oberfähnrich	Fähnrich		Fahnenjunker

== Equipment ==
=== Aircraft ===
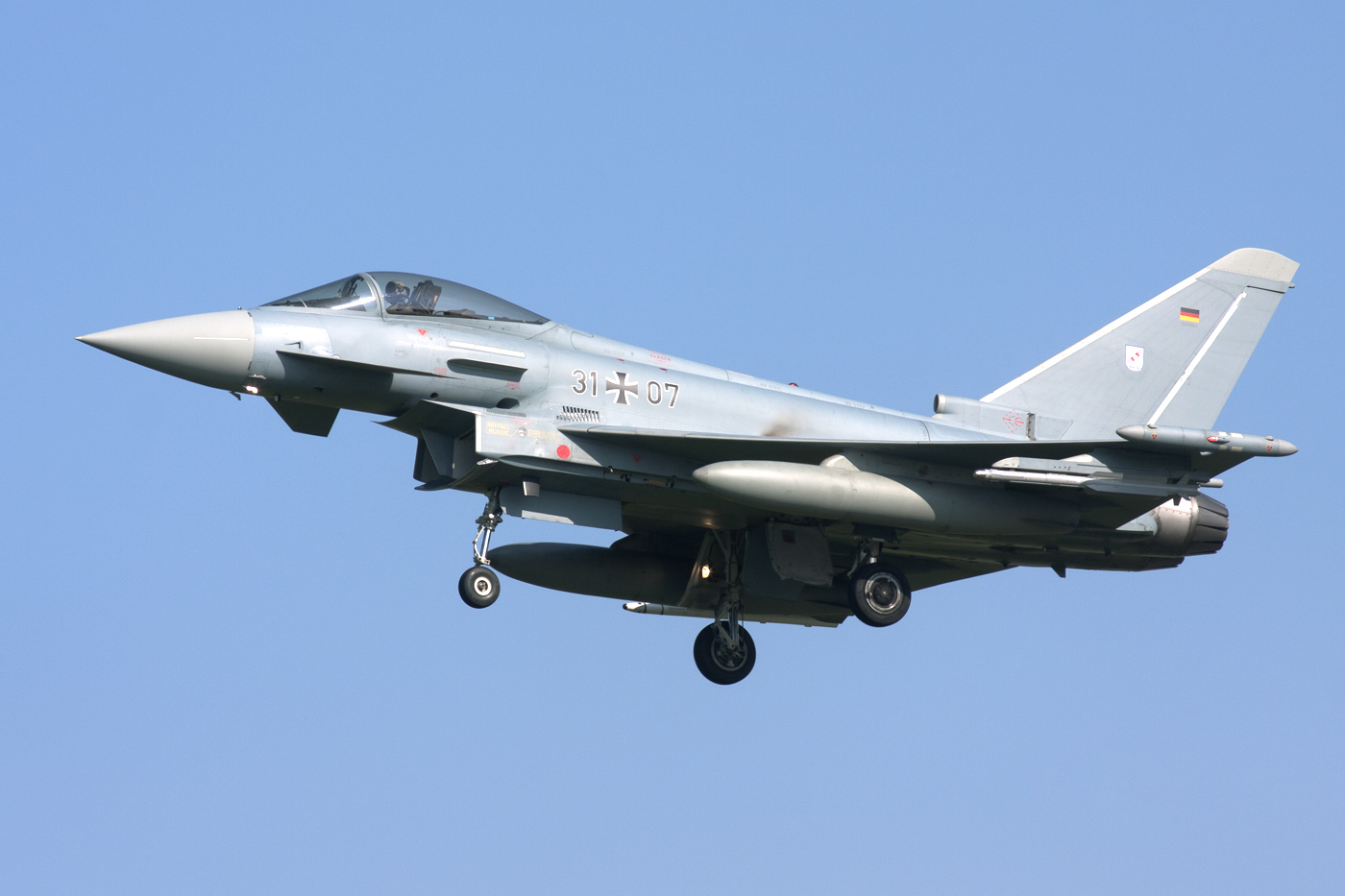
A Eurofighter Typhoon during exercise Frisian Flag

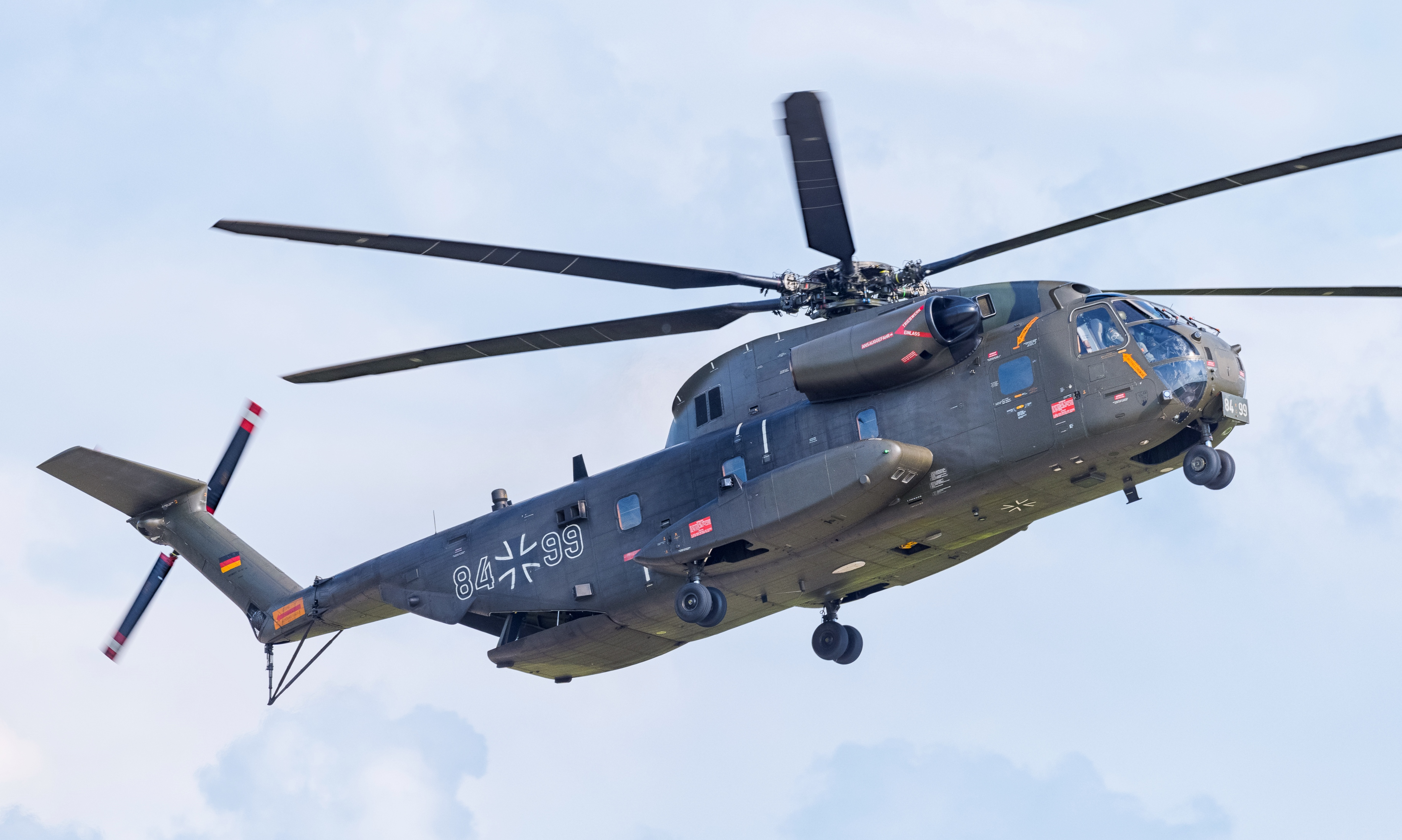
A CH-53G in flight over ILA Berlin, 2016

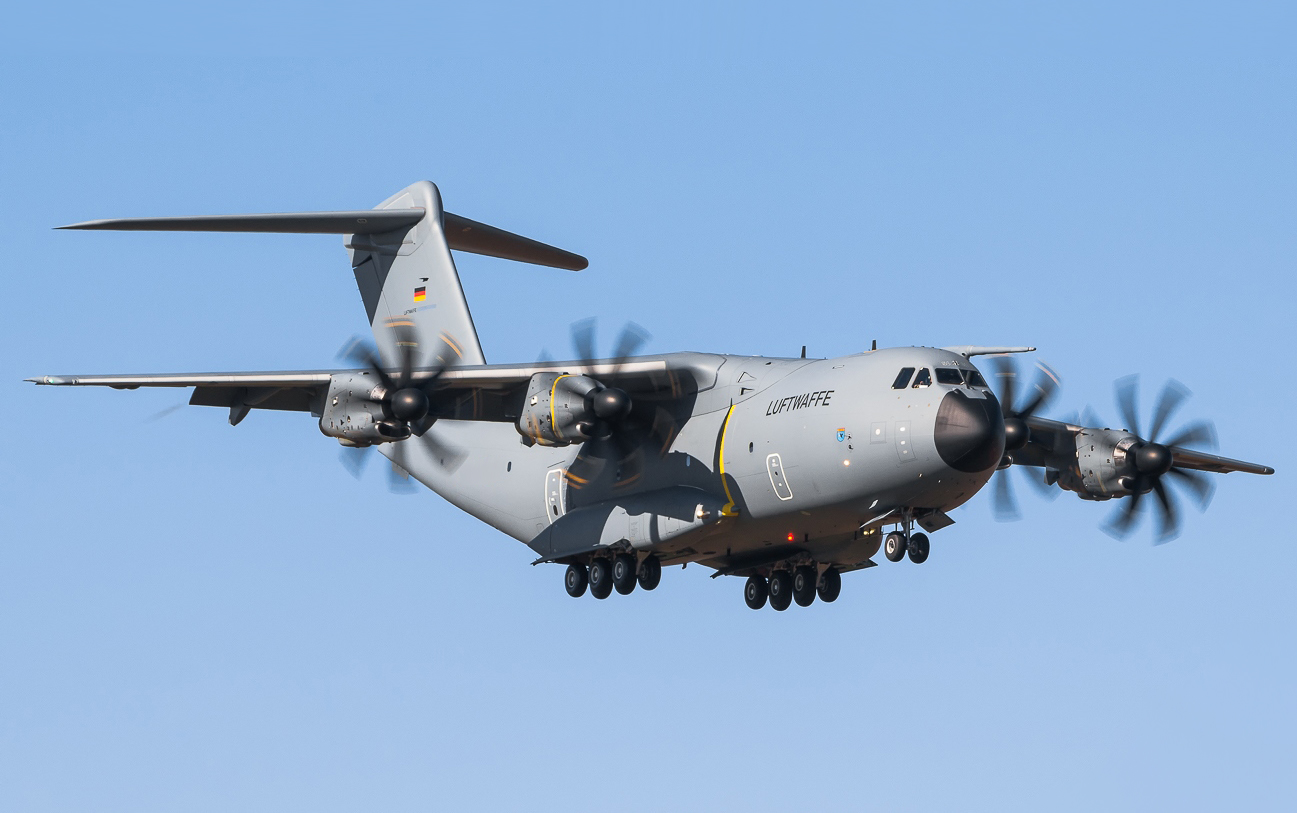
A Luftwaffe A400M on its maiden flight

Aircraft	Origin	Type	Variant	In service	Notes
Combat aircraft
Panavia Tornado	Multinational	Strike / SEAD	IDS / ECR	63 / 21	IDS To be replaced by F-35 Lightning II & ECR by 15 Eurofighter Typhoon EK
Eurofighter Typhoon	Multinational	Multirole fighter	T1, T2, T3, T4	141	38 Tranche 4 and 20 Tranche 5 on order
F-35 Lightning II	United States	Multirole fighter	F-35A		35 on order
Tanker
C-130J Super Hercules	United States	Tanker	KC-130J	3	
Transport
Airbus A319	Europe	VIP transport	A319CJ	3	One used for the Open Skies program
Airbus A321	Europe	Transport	A321-200	1	
Airbus A321neo	Europe	Transport / MEDEVAC	A321LR	2	
Airbus A350	Europe	VIP transport	ACJ350	3	
Airbus A400M	Europe	Transport / Tanker		53	
Global Express	Canada	VIP transport	5000 / 6000	3 / 3	3 SIGINT variants on order
C-130J Super Hercules	United States	Tactical airlifter	C-130J	3	Joint French/German unit
Helicopters
Boeing CH-47 Chinook	United States	Transport	CH-47F		60 on order
Sikorsky CH-53	United States	Transport	CH-53GA/GS	66	To be replaced by Boeing CH-47F
Eurocopter EC145	Germany	Utility	H145M LUH SOF	15	
Eurocopter EC145	Germany	Attack	H145M LKH	2	+ 8 on order
Eurocopter AS532	France	VIP transport	AS532 U2	3	
Trainer aircraft
Grob G 120TP	Germany	Basic trainer		11	
UAVs
IAI Eitan	Israel	UCAV	Heron TP	5	3 on order
IAI Heron	Israel	Surveillance	Heron 1	6	

NOTE: Germany is participating in the MRTT program for their aerial refueling needs, along with contracting Noordzee Helikopters Vlaanderen to provide H145 rotorcraft training

=== Planned investments ===
As of August 2025, Germany plans to invest €350 billion in new equipment through 2041. These investments come on top of the special fund of €100 billion. This includes the following estimated budgets:

- German Air and Space Force:
  - Aircraft and missiles: €34.2 billion
  - Satellite communications: €13.3 billion

== See also ==
- Luftstreitkräfte der NVA
- Glossary of German military terms
- Kommando LSK/LV
- List of military aircraft of Germany
- Luftwaffenmuseum, Berlin
