= Flugabwehrraketengeschwader 1 =

Air Defence Missile Wing 1 “Schleswig Holstein”
- Flugabwehrraketengeschwader 1 “Schleswig Holstein”
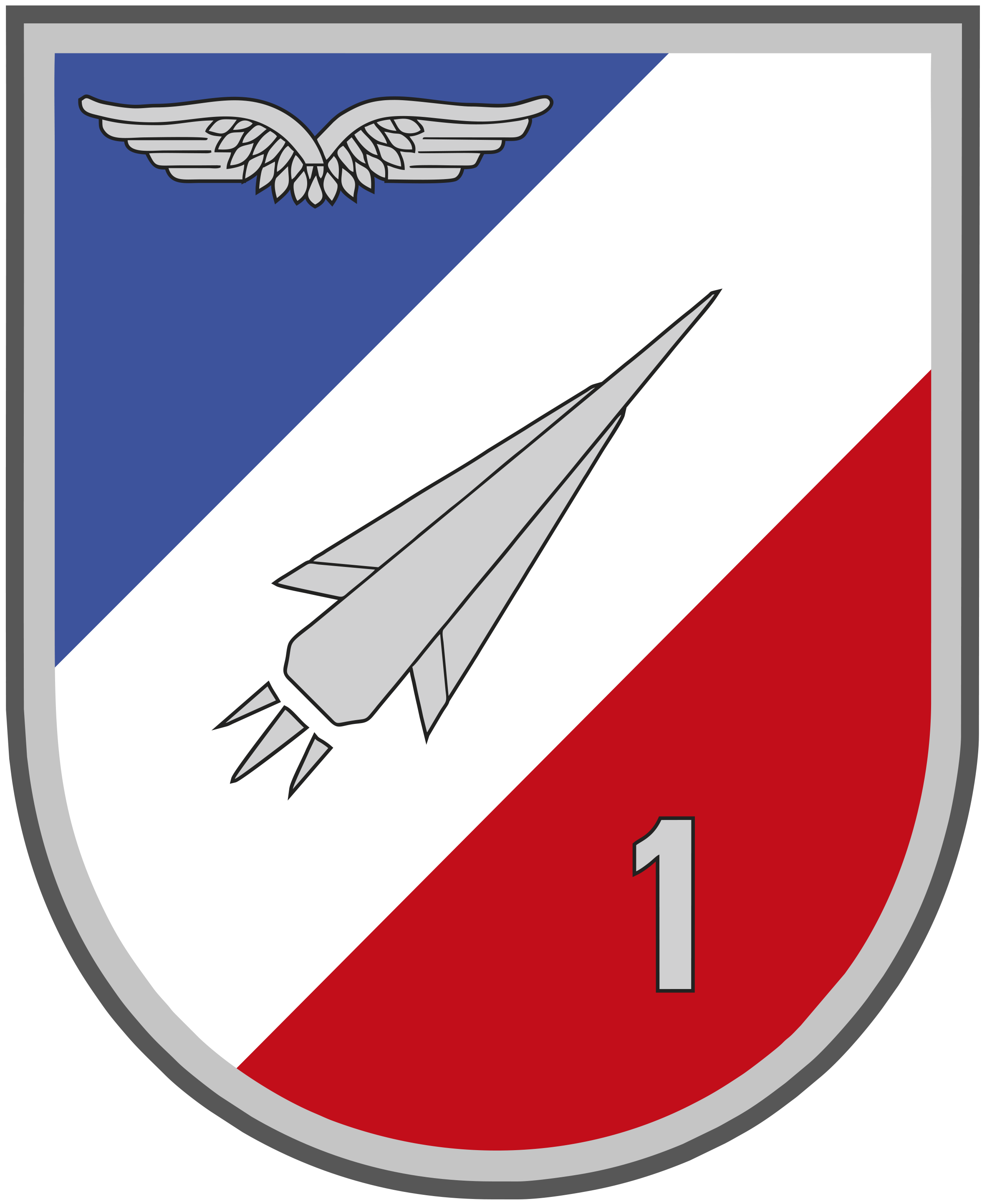
- Insignia
- Active: 1959–present
- Country: Germany
- Branch: German Air Force
- Type: Air defense unit
- Role: Anti-aircraft warfare Counter-battery fire
- Size: one wing
- Part of: Luftwaffentruppenkommando
- Garrison/HQ: Husum
- Nickname(s): "Schleswig-Holstein"
- Equipment: Formerly: Bofors 40 mm, MIM-23 Hawk; Present: MIM-104 Patriot, MANTIS, Wiesel 2 Ozelot
- Website: Official website

Commanders
- Current commander: Colonel Jörg Sievers

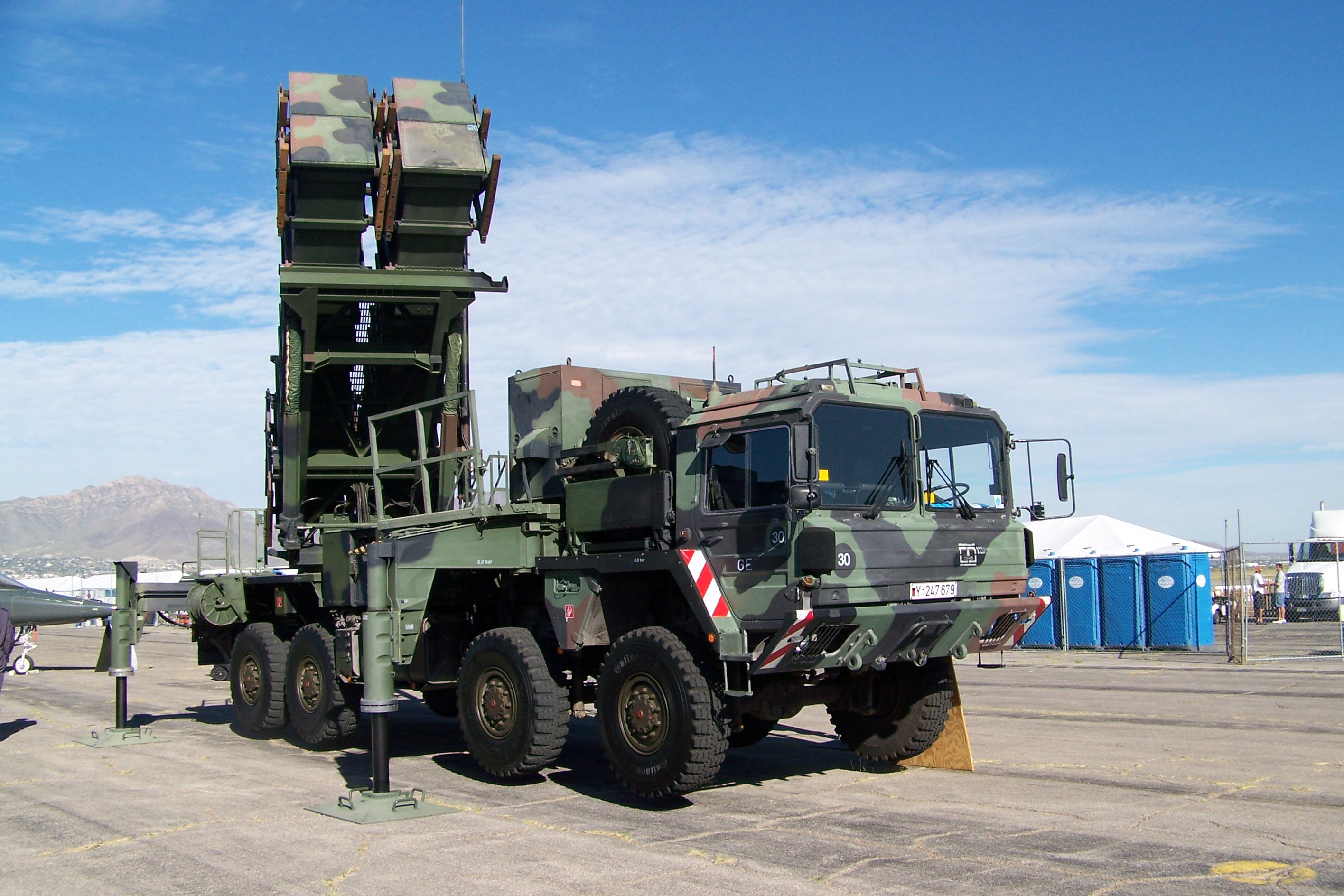
Missile launcher of a Patriot surface-to-air missile system of the German Air Force

Flugabwehrraketengeschwader 1 "Schleswig-Holstein" (Air Defence Missile Wing 1) or (FlaRakG 1) is a unit of the German Air Force based in Stadum and Husum, Northern Germany. The wing is equipped with the Patriot air defense missile system.

== History ==
The unit was established in 1959 as Air Defense Regiment 3 in Essen and was equipped with Bofors 40 mm guns. The same year the unit transferred to Bocholt. In 1960, the unit transferred to Osnabrück. In 1965 the MIM-23 Hawk air defense missile system was introduced and the unit was renamed Air Defense Missile Regiment 3 "Krummenort" and moved to near Rendsburg. In 1967, the unit transferred to Heide. It was renamed Air Defence Missile Command 1 in 1989 and in 1993 reclassified as an air missile wing. Beginning in 1994, the wing moved to its present locations. The HAWK weapons system was deactivated in 2001.

On 1 January 2011, Air Defence Missile Wing 1 took formal responsibility of the short-range protection system MANTIS. To operate this weapons system, the air force called into service an additional anti-aircraft group at Husum on 1 April 2011.

Air Defence Missile Wing 1 was given the honorary name "Schleswig-Holstein" in 1989 and until 30 June 2013 it was part of the Air Forces's 4th Air Division. Currently the unit is assigned to the Luftwaffentruppenkommando.

Based on the agreement between Germany and The Netherlands signed in 2013, the Air Defence Missile Group 61 (Flugabwehrraketengruppe 61) will be integrated in The Netherlands ground-based Air Defence Organisation as part of the close cooperation between both countries from 2016 onwards. The formal transformation under Dutch command was established in April 2018.

== Tasks ==
Air Defence Missile Wing 1 utilises the Patriot air defense missile weapon system to engage in anti-aircraft warfare against aircraft and ballistic missiles.

== Structure ==
Air Defence Missile Wing 1 consists of four groups:

- Air Defence Missile Group 21 (Flugabwehrraketengruppe 21) based at Sanitz
- Air Defence Missile Group 24 (Flugabwehrraketengruppe 24) based at Bad Sülze
- Air Defence Missile Group 26 (Flugabwehrraketengruppe 26) based at Husum
- Air Defence Missile Group 61 (Flugabwehrraketengruppe 61) based at Todendorf until April 2018
