= Jäger Regiment 1 (Bundeswehr) =

Coordinates: 50°53′40.47″N 9°25′08.23″E

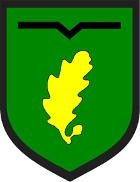
- Insignia
- Active: 2006–2015
- Country: Germany
- Branch: German Army
- Type: Air Assault
- Role: Air Assault Infantry
- Size: 1,800 soldiers
- Part of: 21st Armoured Brigade
- Garrison/HQ: Schwarzenborn, Hesse, Germany
- Engagements: Kosovo War; Afghanistan War: Kunduz Province Campaign

Commanders
- Notable commanders: Lieutenant Colonel Carsten Krämer

Jäger Regiment 1 was an air assault infantry regiment of the German Army. While it comes from the old German tradition of Jäger, it was a relatively recently formed air assault formation, established in 2006. The regiment was part of Airmobile Operations Division, and became subordinate to 21st Armoured Brigade on 19 December 2012. Soldiers of this unit were deployed to the combat zone by helicopters which are supposed to provide fire support as well. Until creation of the Jäger Regiment 1, the Bundeswehr had no air assault capability. The regiment was disbanded and partly replaced by a new battalion in 2015.

== History ==
The regiment was activated in late 2006 and grew to its planned strength until 2008. In March 2008, Jäger Regiment 1 assumed its first operational role and deployed 600 soldiers to Kosovo as part of an operational reserve for ongoing operations of KFOR-troops in the region. In 2009, the entire regiment was deployed to Afghanistan for twelve months. During that time, Jäger Regiment 1 formed the quick reaction force for ISAF's Regional Command North and saw intense action against insurgents in the northern Kunduz Province.

A member of Jäger Regiment 1 was awarded Germany's highest military decoration for gallantry, the Honour Cross for Bravery on January 22, 2010. Sergeant First Class Steffen Knoska rescued a seriously wounded comrade from incoming fire during an ambush in Afghanistan's Kunduz Province on June 7, 2009. The casualty had been struck by a bullet and was lying defenceless on the ground when Knoska charged into hostile fire. Although having been hit by incoming bullets, Knoska refused to give in and eventually was able to drag the man into safety.

In October 2011 the German Federal Ministry of Defence announced a reorganisation/reduction of the German Armed Forces. As a consequence, Jäger Regiment 1 was disbanded. The units based in Hammelburg were completely disbanded whereas at Schwarzenborn two companies were disbanded. On 1 July 2015, the remainder formed the newly created Jäger Battalion 1.

== Structure ==
Unlike many other regiments, Jäger Regiment 1 was not divided into battalions but directly into companies.

The regiment consisted of 10 companies:

- 1. / HQ company
- 2. / light infantry company
- 3. / light infantry company
- 4. / light infantry company (equipped with APCs)
- 5. / heavy infantry company
- 6. / heavy infantry company
- 7. / engineer company
  - combat engineer platoon
  - combat engineer platoon
  - field engineer platoon
- 8. / light air defence battery
  - air defense platoon
  - air defense platoon
  - NBC-Defence platoon
- 9. / logistic company
- 10. / support company

== Equipment ==
Despite its light infantry role, the regiment was also mechanized. For ground mobility, the regiment used the Wolf Light Vehicle which is the standard transport utility vehicle of the German Army. Two mechanized light infantry companies used the Armoured Weapons Carrier Wiesel in variants 1 and 2 equipped with a wide range of weapons such as a mounted BGM-71 TOW guided anti-tank missile, a 20 mm autocannon, a FIM-92 Stinger system (called LeFlaSys) or a mounted 120 mm mortar.

Furthermore, it was planned that the regiment would receive a certain number of GTK Boxer Armoured Fighting Vehicles and Mungo ESK Armoured Multirole Transport Vehicles.

For its air assault role, the regiment could dispose of air lift capabilities in form of one light transport helicopter regiment (Light Transport Helicopter Regiment 10 based at Fassberg) within 1st Airmobile Brigade and three medium transport helicopter regiments (Medium Transport Helicopter Regiment 15 based at Rheine, Medium Transport Helicopter Regiment 25 based at Laupheim and Transport Helicopter Regiment 30 based at Niederstetten) of its superordinate division. These regiments are currently equipped with the UH-1D utility helicopter and the CH-53G(A)(S) medium transport helicopter, a part of which are about to be replaced by the new NH90 helicopter.

== See also ==
- Air assault
- 101st Airborne Division (United States)
- 16th Air Assault Brigade
