= Airmobile Operations Division (Germany) =

Coordinates: 49°49′38.92″N 9°54′06.15″E

Airmobile Operations Division Division Luftbewegliche Operationen
- Airmobile Operations Division Shoulder Insignia
- Active: In current form: July 2002 – June 2014
- Country: Germany
- Branch: Army
- Type: Division
- Role: Air assault, providing specialized forces
- Size: About 14,600 soldiers
- Part of: German Army
- Garrison/HQ: Veitshöchheim
- Mottos: Forwards! Nach vorn!
- Anniversaries: July 1
- Engagements: Kosovo war War in Afghanistan: Operation Harekate Yolo II; Kunduz Province Campaign

Commanders
- Current commander: Major General Benedikt Zimmer
- Notable commanders: Lieutenant General Hans-Otto Budde, former commander of the German Army

Airmobile Operations Division (Division Luftbewegliche Operationen) was a division of the German Army. The division was founded on 1 July 2002 and reported for duty 8 October 2002. Airmobile Operations Division consisted of approximately 14,500 soldiers, 350 of which were stationed at divisional headquarters in Veitshöchheim, Germany.

In October 2011 the German Federal Ministry of Defence announced a reorganisation/reduction of the German Armed Forces. As a consequence, Airmobile Operations Division was dissolved and those units not being disbanded altogether were either transferred to other parts of the armed forces or incorporated into a different command structure. The division itself was officially disbanded on 26 June 2014 and was integrated into the 10th Armoured Division which relocated from Sigmaringen to Veitshöchheim.

== Tasks ==
The tasks of the division were unique within the modern German military in that it was able to provide air mobility as well as ground-based fire support, aerial defence and counter chemical, biological, radiological, and nuclear assets to all parts of the German military. With an additional infantry component, it was also capable of limited air assault operations. The division's command was prepared to fulfil a role as Framework Headquarters for NATO and EU operations. Troops of Airmobile Operations Division also render assistance to civilian authorities during disaster relief operations.

== Coat of arms and motto ==
The coat of arms of Airmobile Operations Division depicts a flying black eagle, with its wings turned upright, holding a sword in its claws on a argent. Below the eagle a red arrow is shown. The argent symbolises dedication and the eagle strength, courage and bravery. The eagle's upturned wings, somewhat unusual in heraldry, represent the lunging out for new power. The sword stands for strike capability and penetration depth. The red arrow illustrates the third dimension, the depth of space and the dynamics of the division. The framing silver cord shows the status as a division. The maroon coloured seam corresponds with the traditional beret colour of the Army Aviation Corps and airborne forces.

The division's motto was the same as the German Army Aviation Corps': Nach vorn! which translates as either "Forward!" or "To the front!".

== Deployment ==
Units of Airmobile Operations Division were deployed in a number of missions under the aegis of either the United Nations, the European Union or NATO.

- SFOR in Bosnia and Herzegovina (ended 2003)
- KFOR (ended 2003)
- Disaster relief following the earthquake in Kashmir, Pakistan (2005-2006))
- EUFOR RD Congo in the Democratic Republic of the Congo (2006)
- ISAF in Afghanistan (from 2002)

== Structure ==
Airmobile Operations Division's staff was based at Veitshöchheim. The division incorporated units from various branches of the German Army. These units were stationed all over Southern and Central parts of Germany.

The following units were directly subordinate to Airmobile Operations Division:

Name of unit	Based at	Insignia	Note
Army Band 12	Veitshöchheim		Incorporated into the Military Music Center of the Bundeswehr in 2013
Signals Battalion Airmobile Operations Division	Veitshöchheim		Disbanded in 2013
Light Transport Helicopter Regiment 30	Niederstetten		Incorporated into the Rapid Forces Division
Medium Transport Helicopter Regiment 15 "Münsterland"	Rheine		Disbanded on 7 March 2013; helicopters transferred to the German Air Force's Helicopter Wing 64
Medium Transport Helicopter Regiment 25 "Oberschwaben"	Laupheim		Disbanded on 5 March 2013; re-established as the German Air Force's Helicopter Wing 64
Artillery Demonstration Regiment 345	Kusel		Relocated to Idar-Oberstein and incorporated into 10th Armoured Division
CBRN Defence Regiment 750 "Baden"	Bruchsal		Restructured into CBRN Defence Battalion 750 "Baden" and now part of Joint Support Service
Light CBRN Defence Company 120	Sonthofen		Disbanded
Security Battalion 12	Hardheim		Assigned to 10th Panzer Division
Army Combat Support Brigade	Bruchsal		Disbanded on 31 December 2012
Airmobile Brigade 1	Fritzlar		Disbanded on 17 December 2013

The following units were subordinate to Airmobile Brigade 1:

Name of unit	Based at	Insignia	Note
Staff Company	Fritzlar		Disbanded on 17 December 2013
Air Assault Infantry Regiment 1	Schwarzenborn		Transferred to 21st Armoured Brigade; to be disbanded and reformed as Light Infantry Battalion 1
Light Transport Helicopter Regiment 10 "Lüneburger Heide"	Faßberg		Incorporated into the Rapid Forces Division
Attack Helicopter Regiment 26 "Franken"	Roth		Disbanded on 30 June 2014
Attack Helicopter Regiment 36 "Kurhessen"	Fritzlar		Incorporated into the Rapid Forces Division

== Commanders ==
Nr	Name	Begin	End
4	Brigadier General Benedikt Zimmer	20 December 2012	26 Juni 2014
3	Major General Erhard Drews	12 February 2009	20 December 2012
2	Major General Carl-Hubertus von Butler	25 August 2005	12 February 2009
1	Major General Dieter Budde	2002	25 August 2005

== Equipment ==
=== Armoured Vehicles ===
- Light air-transportable armoured fighting vehicle Wiesel 1 and Wiesel 2
- Air-transportable, armoured multirole transport vehicle Mungo
- Anti-aircraft cannon tank Gepard
- Surface-to-air missile light armoured tank Ozelot
- Armoured Howitzer 2000

=== Helicopters ===
- Light transport helicopter Bell UH-1D
- Medium transport helicopter Sikorsky CH-53 G/GS
- Light anti-tank helicopter Bo 105P/PAH-1A1
- Light liaison- and reconnaissance helicopter Bo 105 P1M
- Attack helicopter Tiger
- Medium transport helicopter NH-90
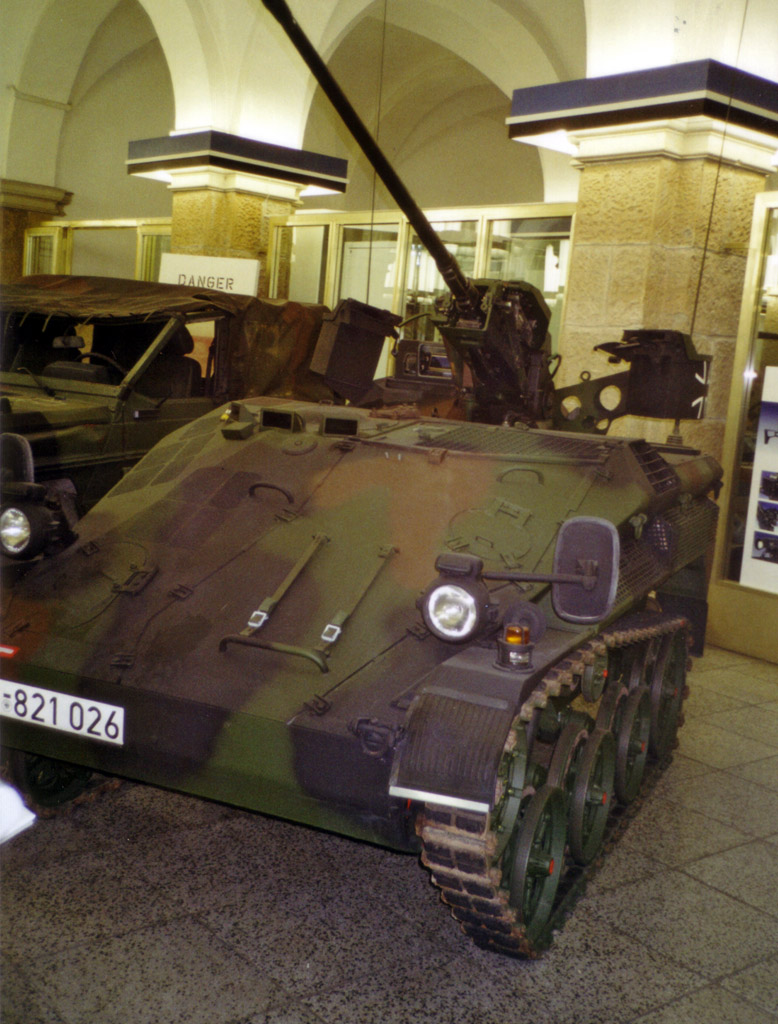
Light armoured fighting vehicle Wiesel 1

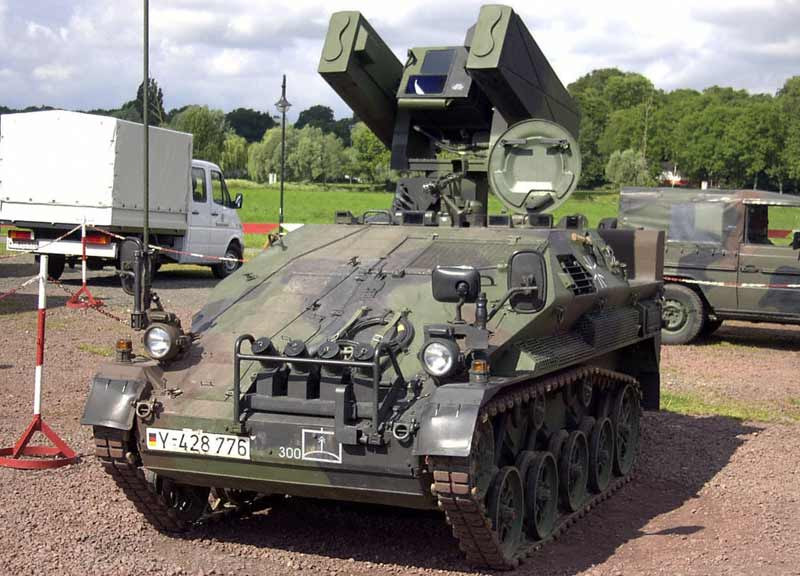
Surface-to-air missile light armoured tank Ozelot

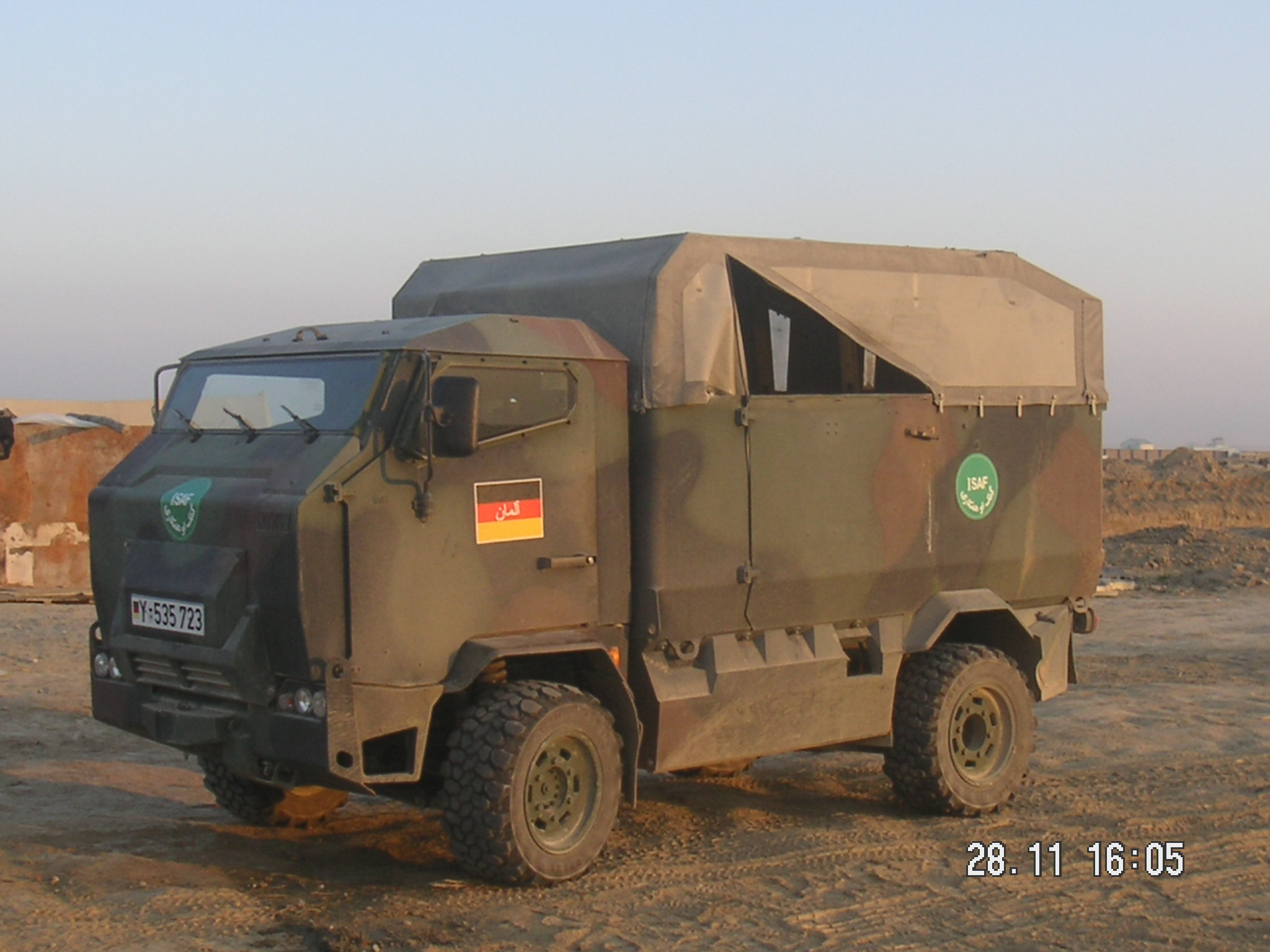
Transport vehicle Mungo in Afghanistan

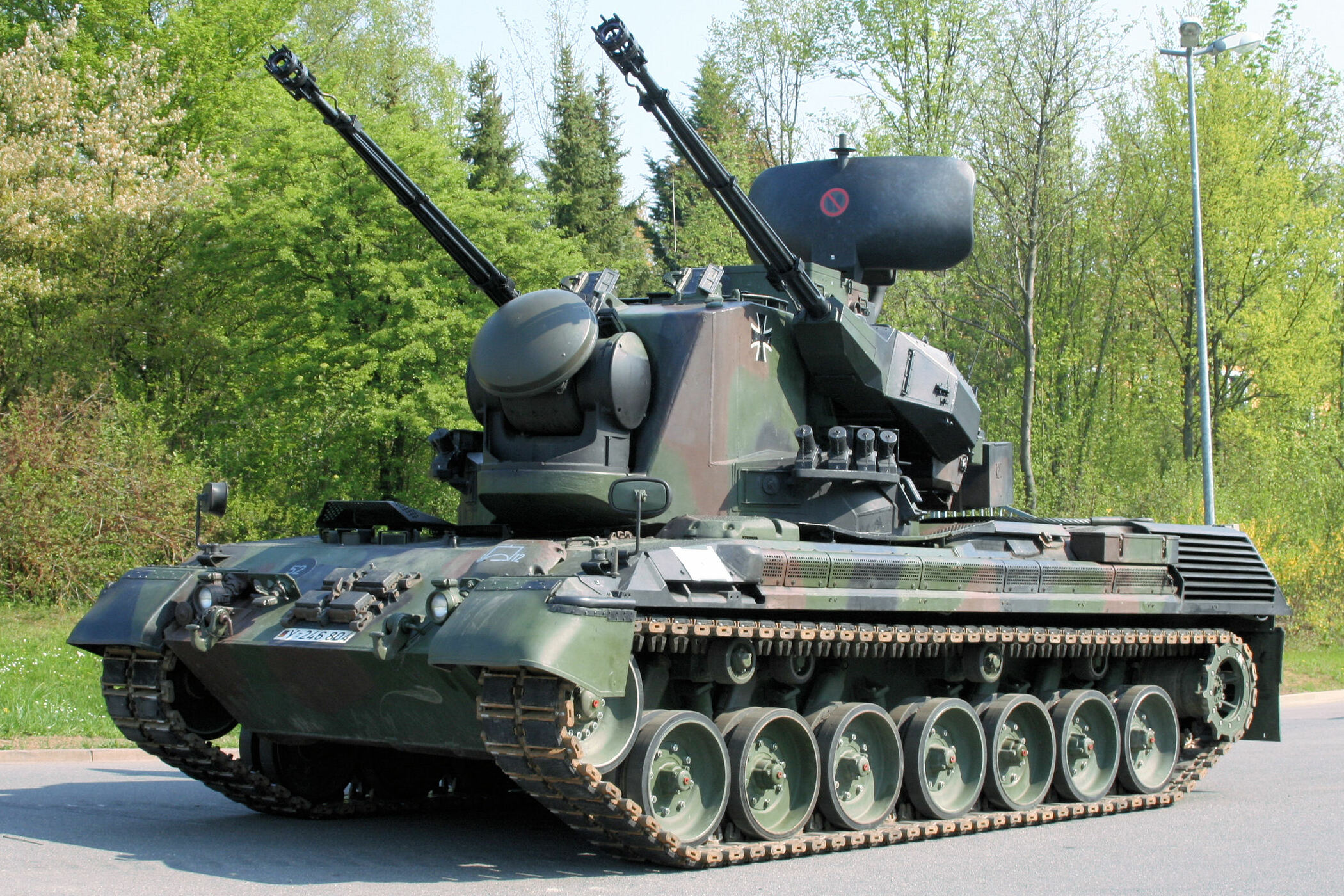
Anti-aircraft cannon tank Gepard

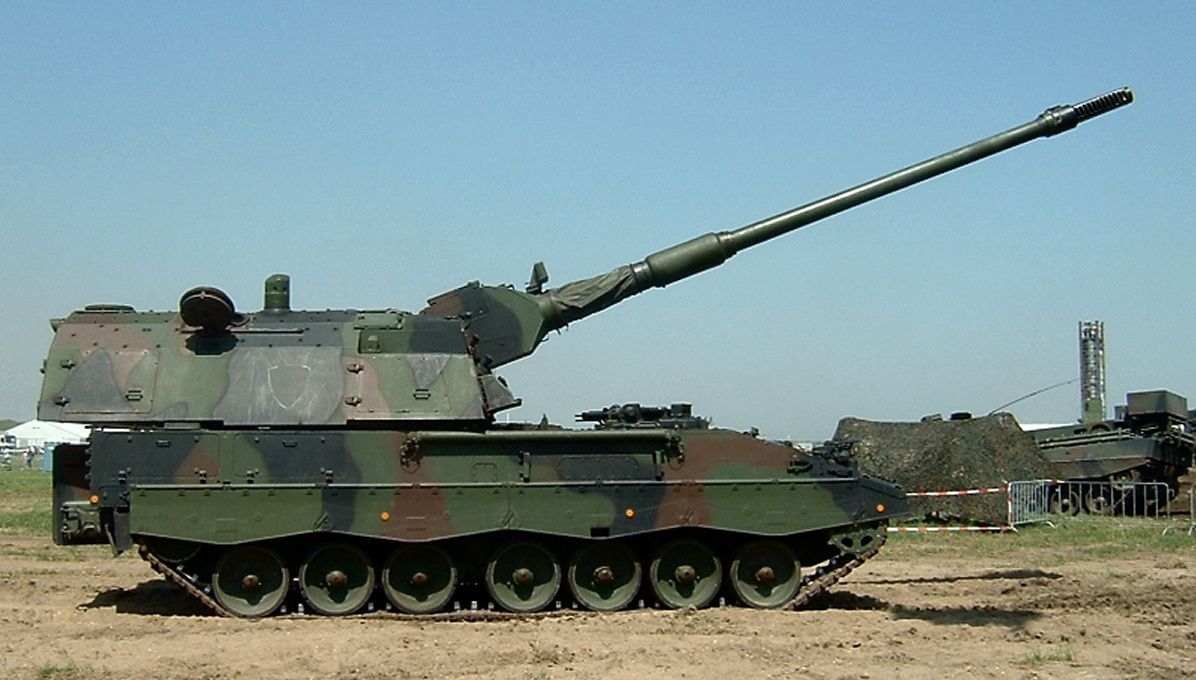
Armoured Howitzer 2000

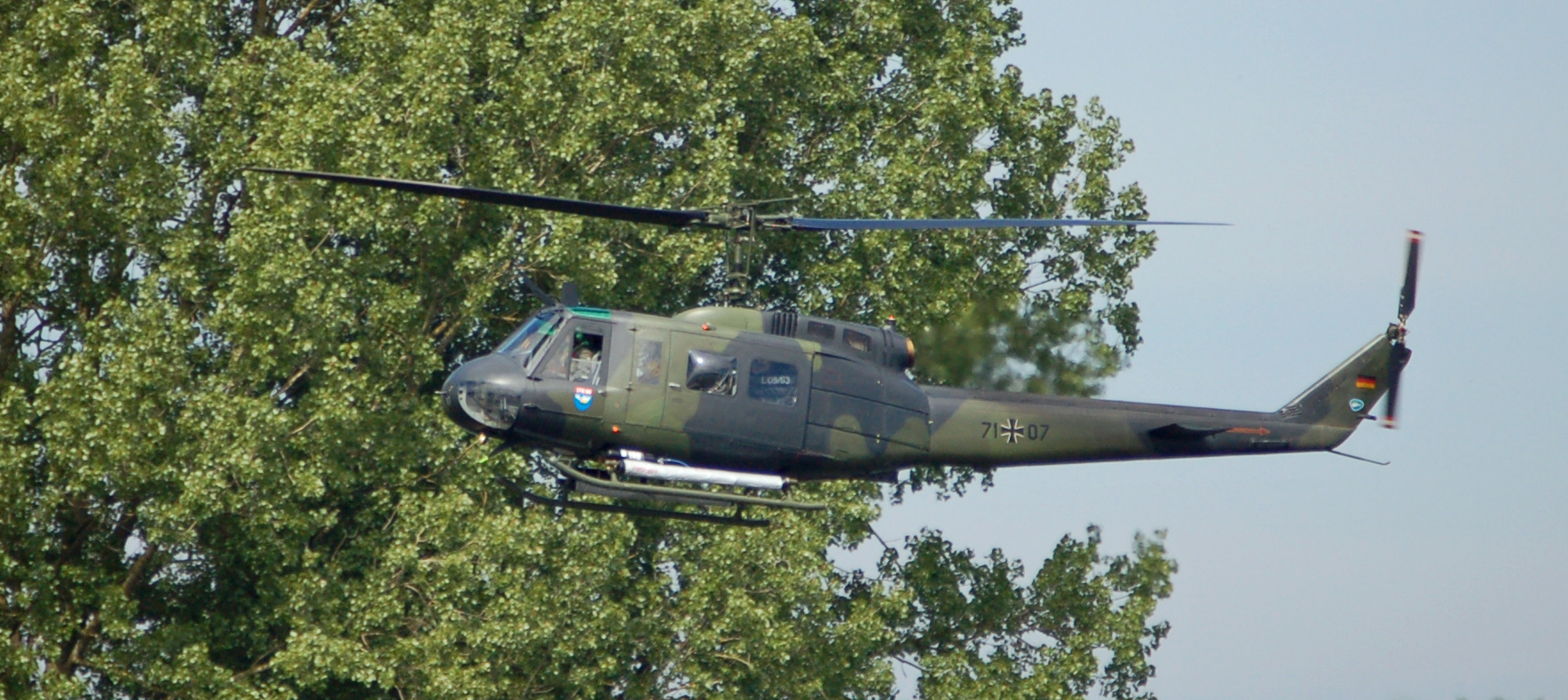
Bell UH-1D

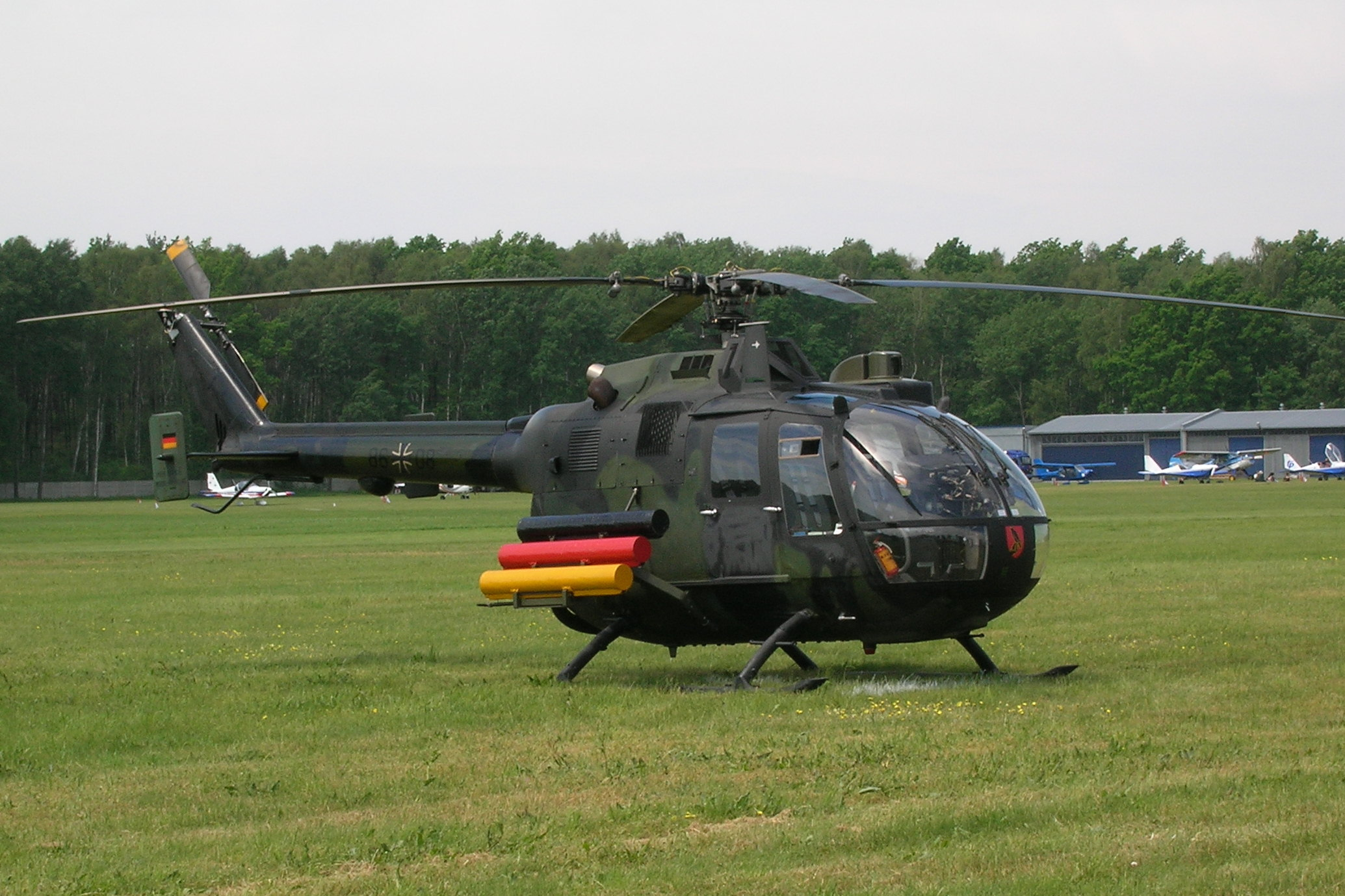
Bo 105 PAH-1

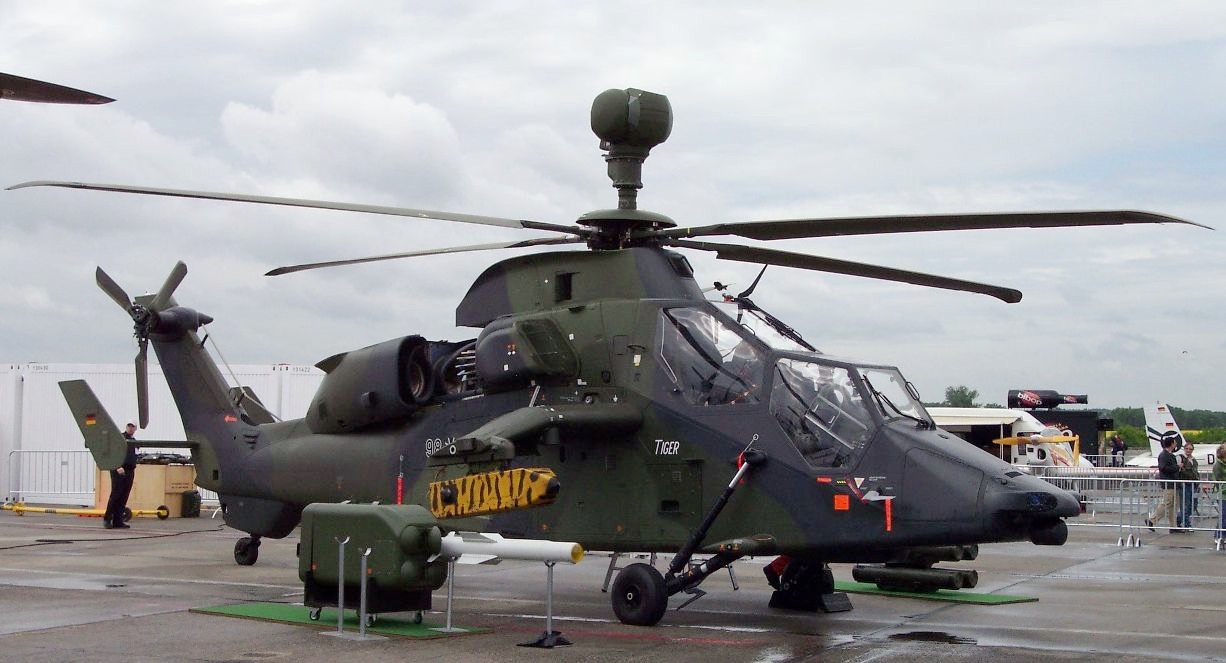
Eurocopter Tiger

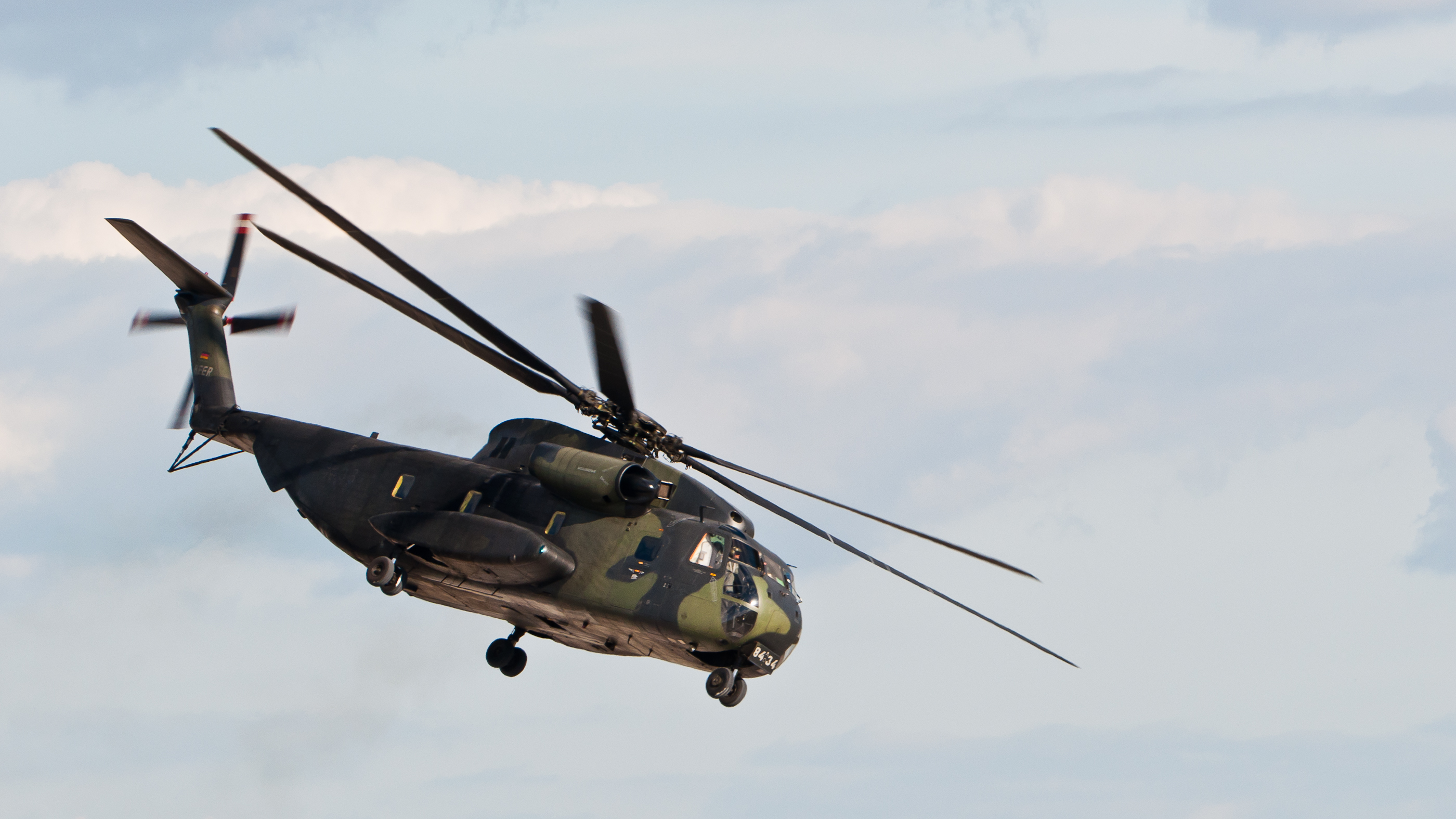
CH-53G

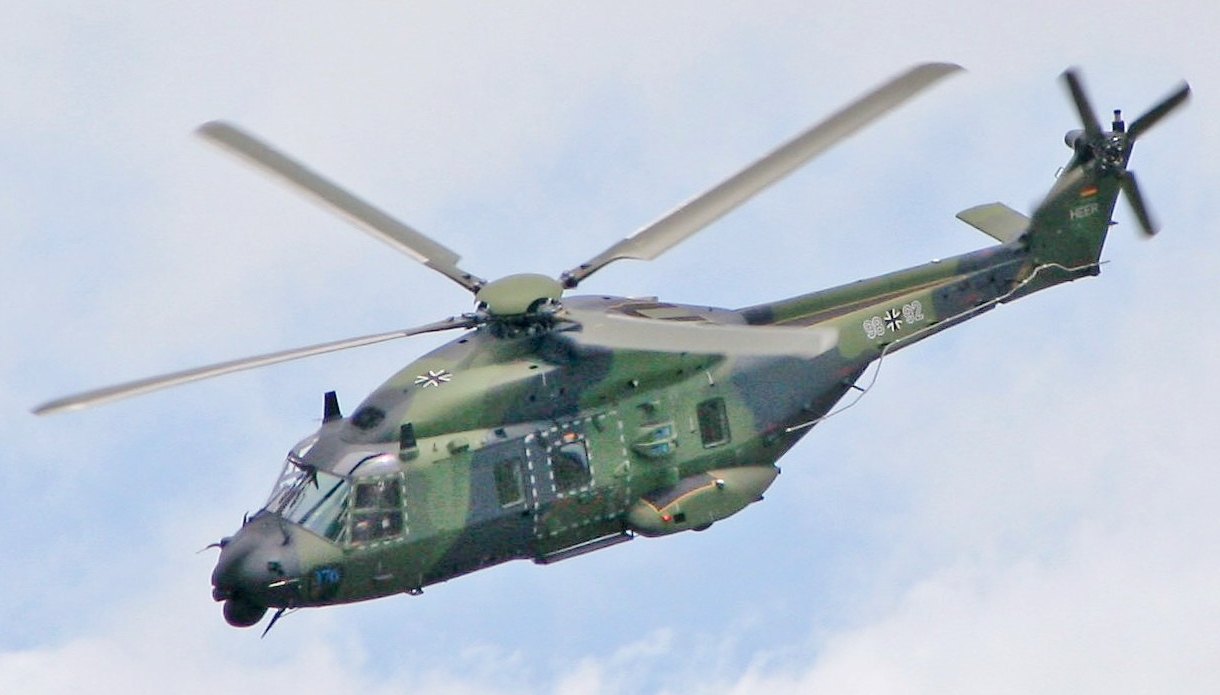
NH-90

== See also ==
- Bundeswehr
- German Army
