= Helicopter Wing 64 =

Wing of the German Air Force

- Helicopter Wing 64 badge
- Active: 1 October 2010–present
- Country: Germany
- Branch: German Air Force
- Part of: Air Force Troops Command
- Garrison/HQ: Laupheim Air Base

Commanders
- Current commander: Colonel Sascha Bleibohm

Aircraft flown
- Helicopter: CH-53G; H145M LUH SOF

Helicopter Wing 64 (German: Hubschraubergeschwader 64) is a wing of the German Air Force (Luftwaffe). It was subordinate to Air Force Forces Command until that was disbanded in 2013. In 2015 Helicopter Wing 64 was integrated into Air Force Troops Command which is subordinate to Air Force Command.

The wing was formed in 2010. Its headquarters, originally being based at Holzdorf Air Base in Saxony-Anhalt, Germany, relocated to Laupheim Air Base on 1 January 2013. It is the only wing within the German Air Force whose weapon systems consist solely of helicopters.

Helicopter Wing 64 consists of three groups and has a total of 60 helicopters of the type CH-53G at its disposal, 48 of which are stationed at Laupheim Air Base, whereas the remaining 12 are based at Holzdorf Air Base. Since 2017 it has also been operating 15 helicopters of the type H145M LUH SOF.

== History ==
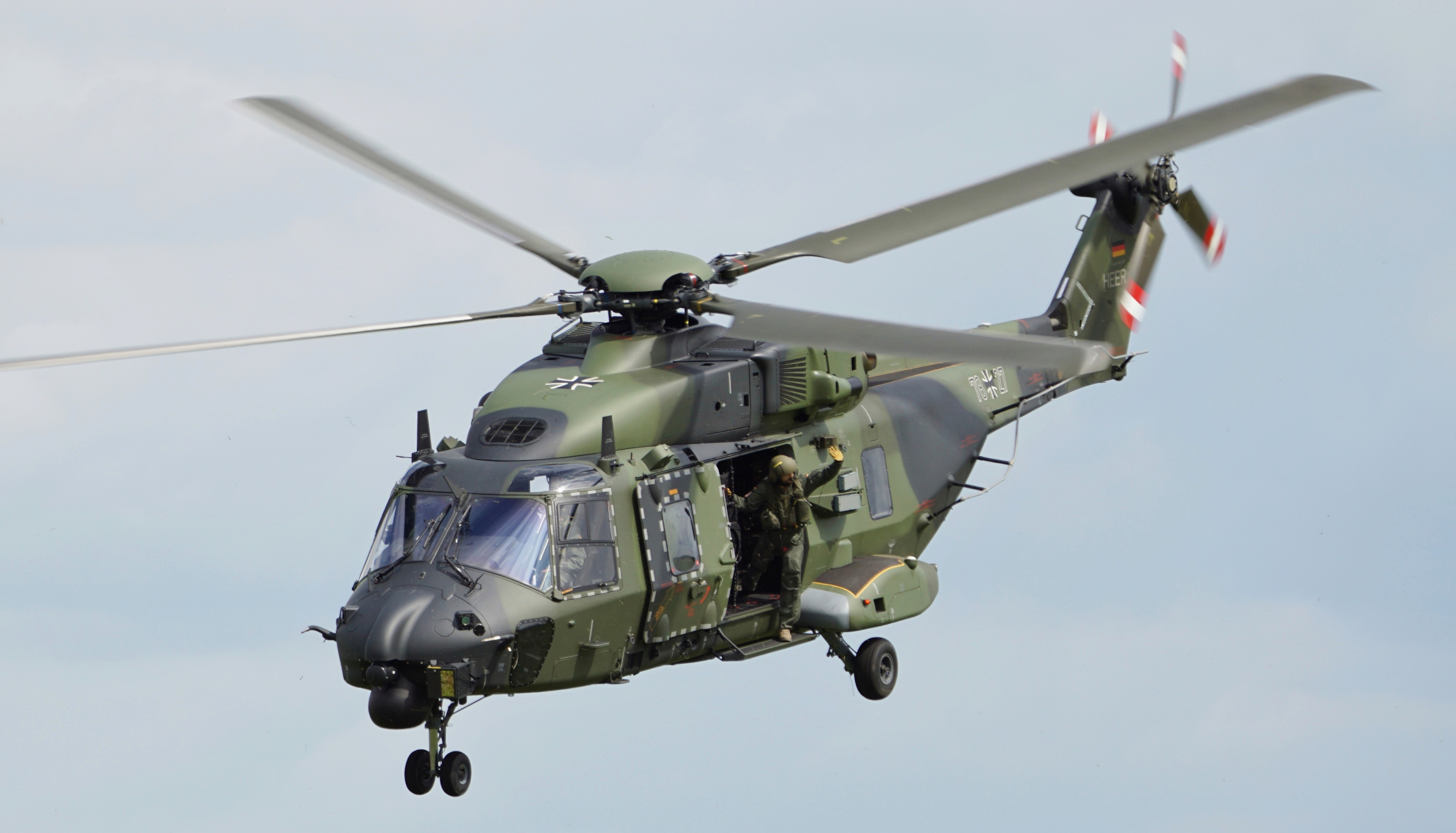
German NH90

The origins of Helicopter Wing 64 lie in the airforce's Helicopter Transport Wing 64 founded in 1966. When the wing was disbanded in April 1994 personnel and equipment were absorbed by the other air transport wings of the German Air Force. Some personnel and material was transferred to Holzdorf Air Base and incorporated into the command structure of Air Transport Wing 62.

Helicopter Wing 64 was created on 1 October 2010 when the helicopters previously assigned to Air Transport Wing 62 formed a new unit. Until 1 January 2013 the wing flew predominantly Bell UH-1D which were to be replaced by helicopters of the type NH90. The first helicopter of the type NH90 was handed over to Helicopter Wing 64 on 21 October 2010, three weeks after the formation of the new unit. Initially, three NH90's were being tested at the air base with another five having been delivered by October 2012.

Whereas helicopter units of the German Army Aviation Corps have been deployed in a variety of military missions abroad, mainly as part of KFOR in Kosovo and ISAF in Afghanistan, Helicopter Wing 64 had not been brought into action outside Germany until 2013. However, only weeks after having been established, the wing provided disaster relief when the river Black Elster burst its banks, resulting in dam failures, which caused widespread flooding in Bad Liebenwerda, Löben and the surrounding areas in September and early October 2010. Helicopter Wing 64 clocked a total of 171 flying hours during this operation.

In October 2011 the German Federal Ministry of Defence announced a reorganisation/reduction of the German Armed Forces. As a consequence, all helicopters of the type CH-53G were to be transferred to the Air Force. German Army Aviation Corps Medium Transport Helicopter Regiment 25 flying CH-53G, based at Laupheim Air Base, was disbanded on 31 December 2012 and re-established as new Helicopter Wing 64 on 1 January 2013. The other unit within the German Army flying CH-53G, Aviation Corps Medium Transport Regiment 15 based at Rheine Air Base, will be disbanded, a number of its helicopters eventually relocating to either Laupheim Air Base or Holzdorf Air Base. The remainder will be decommissioned. The wing's helicopters of the type Bell UH-1D and NH90 were transferred to the German Army. The tasks previously carried out by helicopters of Helicopter Wing 64, most importantly national SAR service and CSAR, were also transferred to the German Army. The restructured wing has a strength of approximately 1800 personnel, 1200 of which are stationed at Laupheim Air Base, the remaining 600 at Holzdorf Air Base.

During the 2013 European floods helicopters from the wing provided logistic support. Seven helicopters of the wing were employed to stabilise dikes, give aid fixing gaps after dike breaches, and evacuate humans at risk of being submerged by the flood. Holzdorf Air Base was utilised as hub for all aerial rescue and support operations at the rivers Elbe, Saale, Mulde, Black Elster and White Elster as well as near Bitterfeld and in Fischbeck.

When wildfires broke out in Northern Germany during the 2018 European heat wave helicopters from Helicopter Wing 64 were called in to assist the local fire brigades south-east of Berlin.

== Tasks ==
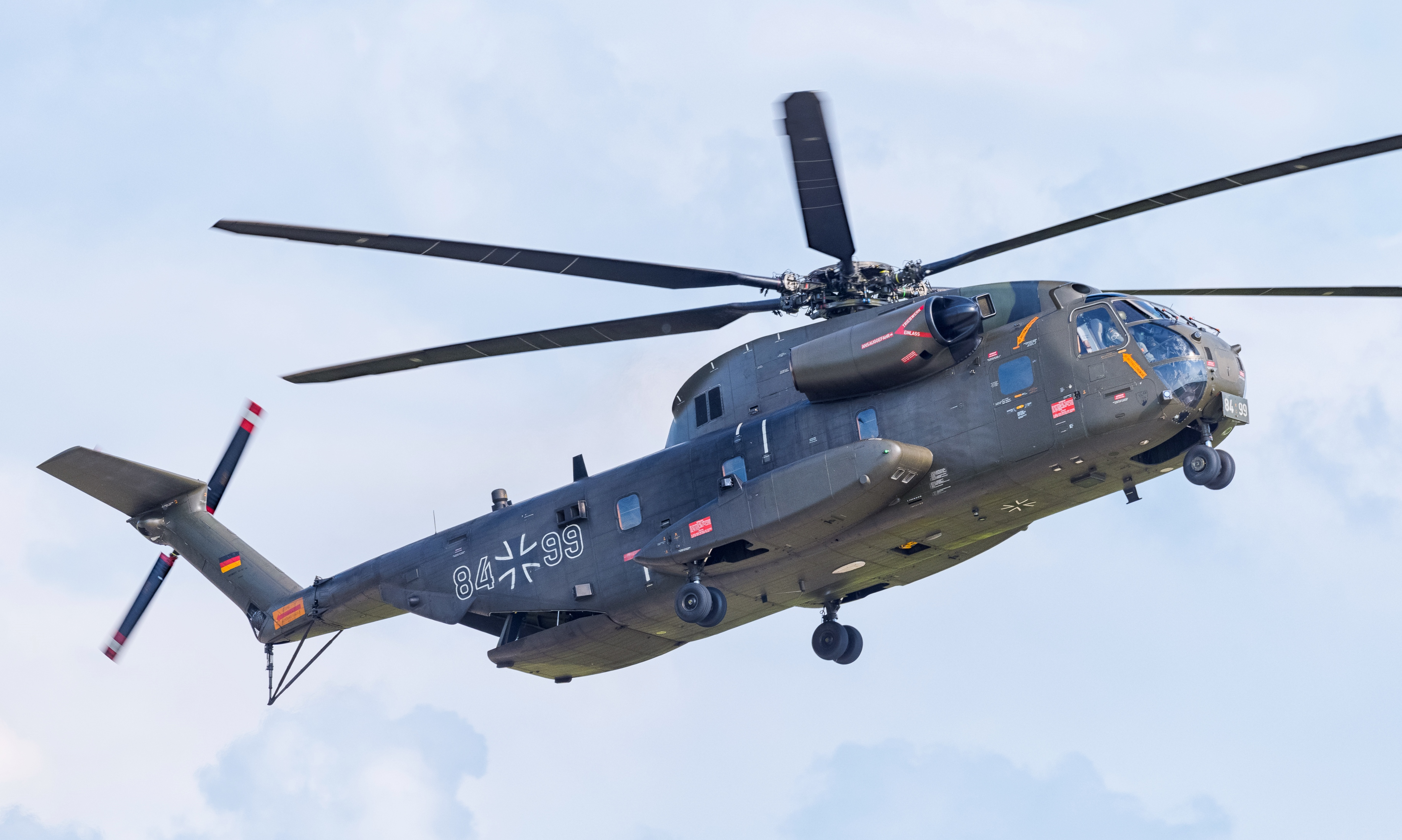
CH-53G from Helicopter Wing 64

Being the only helicopter wing in the German Air Force, Helicopter Wing 64 has the following tasks:

- Providing air transport for all military branches of national as well as multinational forces
- Planning, operating and supervising of personal recovery missions
- Support of special operations formation Kommando Spezialkräfte
- Medical evacuation (MEDEVAC) and military evacuation operations
- Advanced pilot training (carried out at Holzdorf Air Base)
- Operating two airbases: Laupheim Air Base and Holzdorf Air Base

== Structure ==
Helicopter Wing 64 was originally subordinate to Air Force Forces Command (disbanded in 2013) but is now subordinate to Air Force Troops Command created in 2015. However, unlike the other air force's transport wings, Helicopter Wing 64 is not integrated into the command structure of European Air Transport Command (EATC). The wing's main force, the Flying Group and the Technical Group, is stationed at Laupheim Air Base whereas a third group, the Air Transport Group, is based at Holzdorf Air Base.

- Wing Headquarters (Stab HSG 64) (Laupheim Air Base)
- Flight Group (FlgGrp HSG 64) (Laupheim Air Base)
  - No. 1 Squadron (1.FlgStff HSG 64) – CH-53GA/GE/GS (CSAR, MedEvac, special operations support, troop transport and supply)
  - No. 2 Squadron (2.FlgStff HSG 64) – CH-53GA/GE/GS (CSAR, MedEvac, special operations support, troop transport and supply)
  - No. 4 Squadron (4.FlgStff HSG 64) – H145M (dedicated support to the German Army's Kommando Spezialkräfte special operations formation)
  - Flight Support Service Squadron (FlBtrbStff HSG 64)
- Technical Group (TGrp HSG 64) (Laupheim Air Base)
  - Aircraft and Weapons Maintenance Squadron (Wtg/WaStff HSG 64)
  - Aircraft and Electronics Repair Squadron (Inst/EloStff HSG 64)
  - Supply and Transport Squadron (Nsch/TrspStff HSG 64)
- Air Transport Group (LTGrp HSG 64) (Holzdorf Air Base)
  - No. 3 Squadron (3.FlgStff HSG 64) – 20 x CH-53GA (training tasks, medium air transport tasks, disaster relief tasks)
  - Technical Squadron (TStff HSG 64)
  - Supply Squadron (VersStff HSG 64)
  - Airfield Maintenance Squadron (FlPlStff HSG 64)
  - Detached Aircraft Repair Squadron (AbgInsthStff HSG 64) (Diepholz Air Base)

== Equipment ==
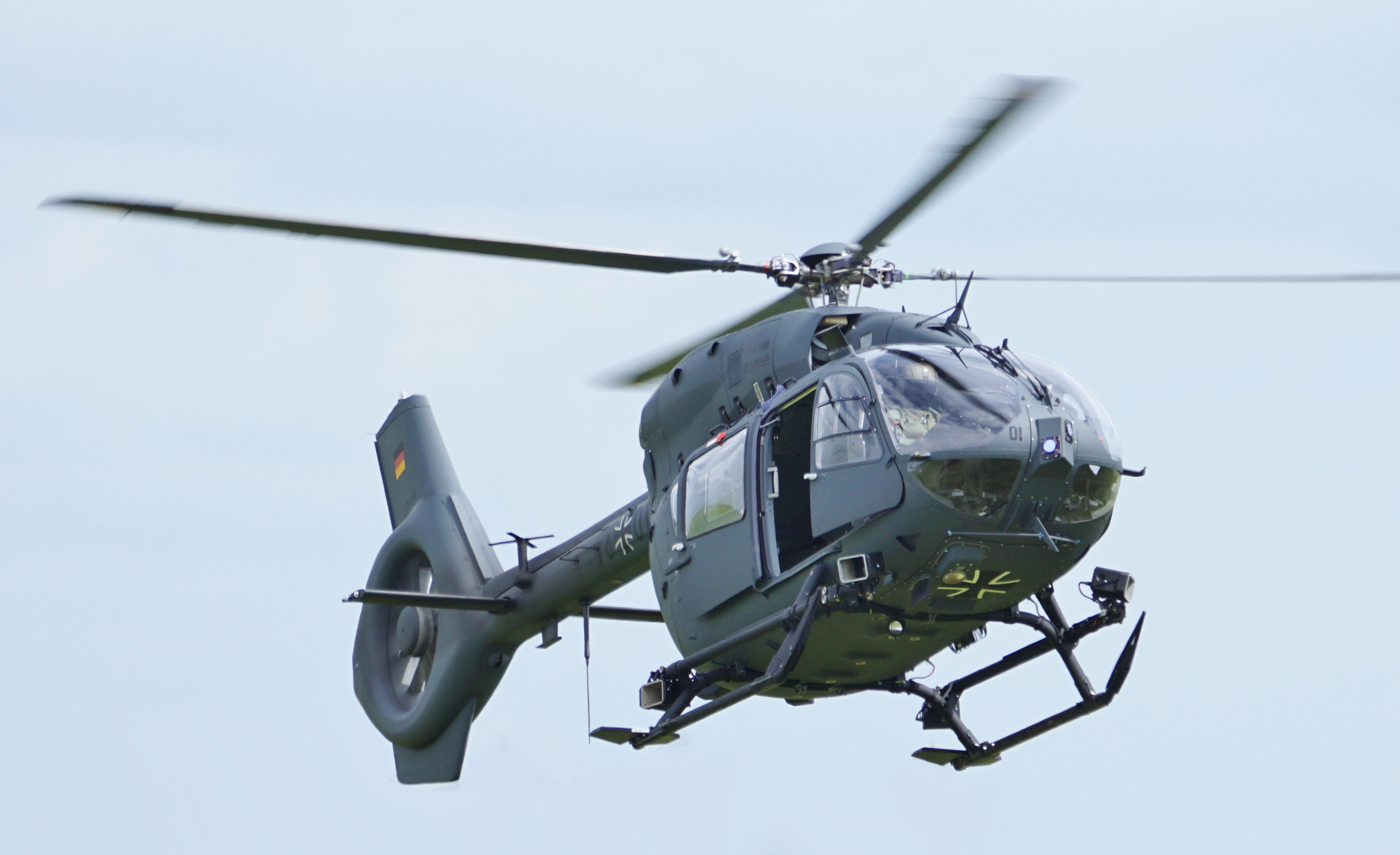
H145M LUH SOF

=== Current ===
- CH-53G
- H145M LUH SOF

=== Former ===
- NHIndustries NH90
- Bell UH-1D

== International deployment ==
- International Security Assistance Force (ISAF) in Afghanistan

== See also ==
- German Army Aviation Corps
- List of airports in Germany
