= Rheine-Bentlage Air Base =

Former Army air base in Germany

Rheine-Bentlage Air Base Heeresflugplatz Rheine-Bentlage

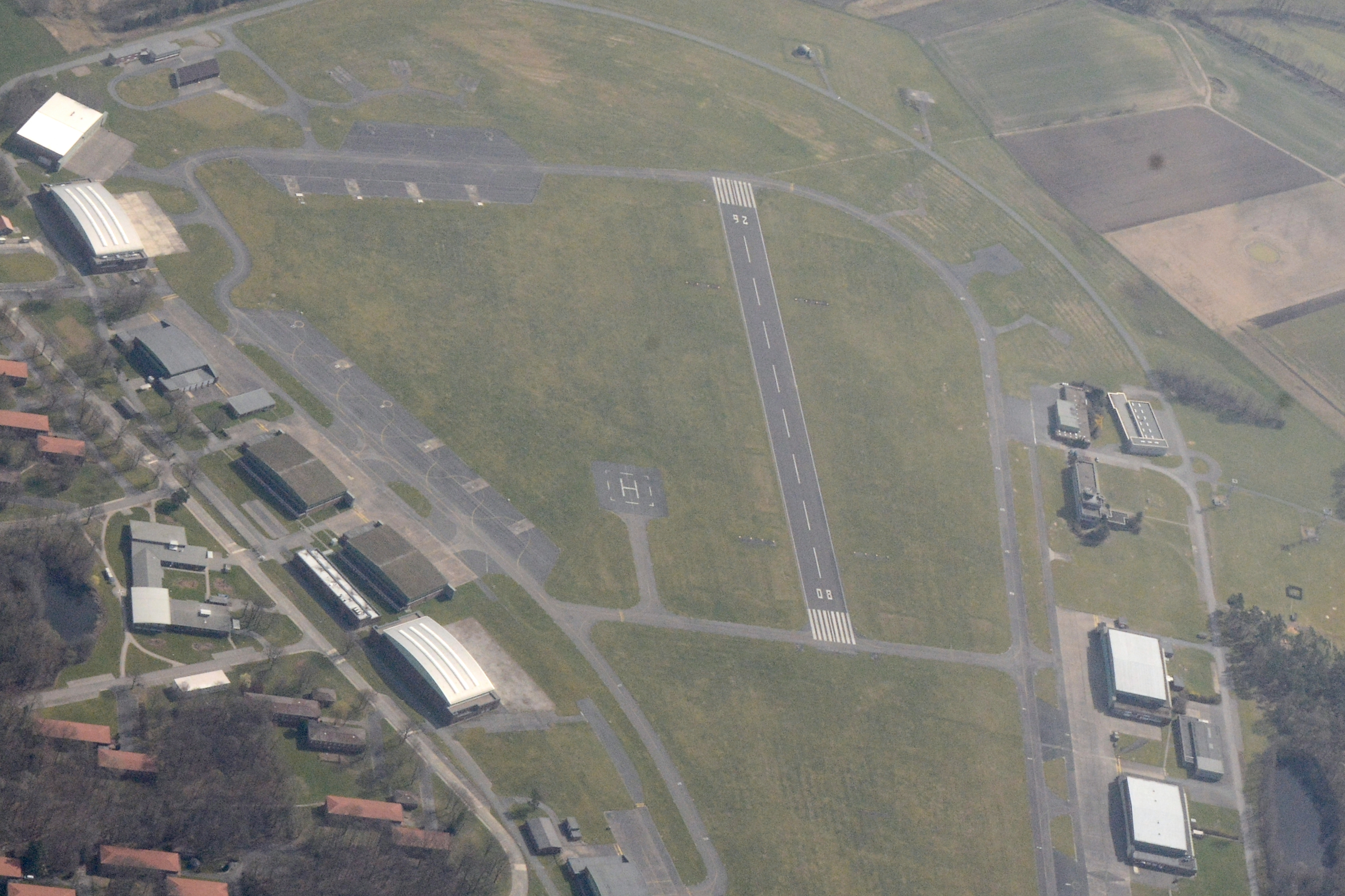
- IATA: none; ICAO: ETHE

Summary
- Airport type: Military
- Owner: Federal Ministry of Defence
- Operator: German Army
- Location: Rheine
- Built: 1940
- In use: 1940 - 1945; 1960 - 2017
- Occupants: German Army Aviation Corps
- Elevation AMSL: 128 ft (39 m)
- Coordinates: 52°17′32″N 007°23′06″E

Map
- Location of Rheine-Bentlage Air Base

Runways
Direction	Length		Surface
Direction	m	ft	Surface
09/27	510	1,637	Asphalt

Rheine-Bentlage Air Base (German: Heeresflugplatz Rheine-Bentlage) (ICAO: ETHE) was an air base of the German Armed Forces and located near the village of Bentlage, 2 km northwest of the city of Rheine, North Rhine-Westphalia, Germany.

== History ==
In 1939 work to build an air base for the Luftwaffe began. These preparations were completed in 1940. During World War II extensive use was made of the air base, particularly by night and day fighter squadrons. After the war the air base was abandoned.

In 1960, following the founding of the Bundeswehr in 1955 and the establishing of a new branch within the German Army, the Aviation Corps, completely new military installations, hangars and a small runway made of asphalt, were constructed on the grounds of the former German Air Force base.

Since 1960 various units of the German Army Aviation Corps have been stationed at Rheine Air Base. Initially, these units flew Sikorsky H-34 helicopters, which were used extensively during relief operations following the disastrous North Sea flood of 1962. Another type of helicopter stationed at Rheine-Bentlage was the Alouette II.

In 1974, the Sikorsky CH-53 replaced the by now obsolete H-34 and has been in service at Rheine-Bentlage ever since, along with a small number of Bo 105VBH helicopters. In 1975, the air base was officially named Theodor Blank Barracks after the first Federal Minister of Defence of Germany.

Helicopters from Rheine-Bentlage have carried out humanitarian operations in Italy, Greece and the Pyrenees, offering help and logistic support after natural disasters.

Since unification of Germany in 1990, units from Rheine-Bentlage were deployed in as various part as the Balkans, Iraq and Afghanistan under the auspices of either NATO, the United Nations or the European Union.

All units stationed at Rheine-Bentlage were incorporated into Army Aviation Medium Transport Regiment 15 in 2003. In 2004, after a further restructuring of the Bundeswehr, during which many bases were closed, Army Aviation Medium Transport Regiment 15 was given the honorary name Münsterland, this being the result of the German Army's continuing commitment to the base at the time.

Army Aviation Medium Transport Regiment 15 was part of Airmobile Operations Division.

=== Closure and further use ===
In October 2011 the German Federal Ministry of Defence announced a reorganisation/reduction of the German Armed Forces. As a consequence, Army Aviation Medium Transport Regiment 15 and all auxiliary units were formally disbanded on 31 December 2012. The remaining military personnel are employed at the defence depot. The number of military personnel at the base will be reduced by almost 94 per cent to 120. A number of helicopters stationed at Rheine-Bentlage were relocated to either Laupheim Air Base in Southern Germany or Holzdorf Air Base in Saxony-Anhalt where they were integrated into Helicopter Wing 64. The rest were decommissioned.

On 31 December 2017, the last military personnel left the air base which was subsequently closed.

Some of the air base's facilities are used by amateur Aeroclub Rheine. Civil protection organisation Technisches Hilfswerk (Federal Agency for Technical Relief) provisionally utilises buildings on the former air base while their dilapidated buildings in Rheine are being renovated.

In July 2019 the Federal Ministry of Defence announced that the former air base's barracks will be home to Medical Regiment 4 which is to be established and planned to be operational in April 2020. Approximately 350 military personnel will be stationed at Rheine-Bentlage.

== See also ==
- German Army Aviation Corps
- History of the German Army Aviation Corps
- German Army
