= Medium Transport Helicopter Regiment 25 =

Former regiment in the German Army

Coordinates: 48.2190°N 9.9115°E

Mittleres Transporthubschrauberregiment 25 (Medium Transport Helicopter Regiment 25)
- Active: 1971-2012
- Disbanded: 31 December 2012, reformed as Helicopter Wing 64 on 1 January 2013
- Country: Federal Republic of Germany
- Branch: German Army
- Type: Army Aviation
- Part of: Airmobile Operations Division
- Garrison/HQ: Laupheim Air Base
- Mottos: Hals- und Beinbruch; Break a leg

Commanders
- Current commander: Colonel Hans-Christoph Specht (until 31 December 2012)

Aircraft flown
- Cargo helicopter: CH-53 G/GS
- Reconnaissance: MBB Bo 105M

Medium Transport Helicopter Regiment 25 (German: Mittleres Transporthubschrauberregiment 25) was a regiment in the German Army, part of the German Army Aviation Corps. It was based at Kurt Georg Kiesinger Barracks on Laupheim Air Base in the German state of Baden Württemberg, Southern Germany. The regiment was founded in 1971 and disbanded on 31 December 2012. Its sister regiment was Medium Transport Helicopter Regiment 15 based at Rheine Air Base.

On 1 January 2013 the unit was re-established as Helicopter Wing 64 of the German Air Force, integrating those parts of the already existing Helicopter Wing 64 that were not handed over to the German Army.

== Tasks ==
Medium Transport Helicopter Regiment 25 had the following tasks:

- Performing of air transport in cooperation with combat and combat support units as well as special forces
- Air support of special forces and of operations of the 1st Airmobile Brigade
- Air transport on behalf of Airmobile Operations Division
- Operating a German Army airbase
- When deployed, operating from an assembly area or a German Army frontline airstrip and running it

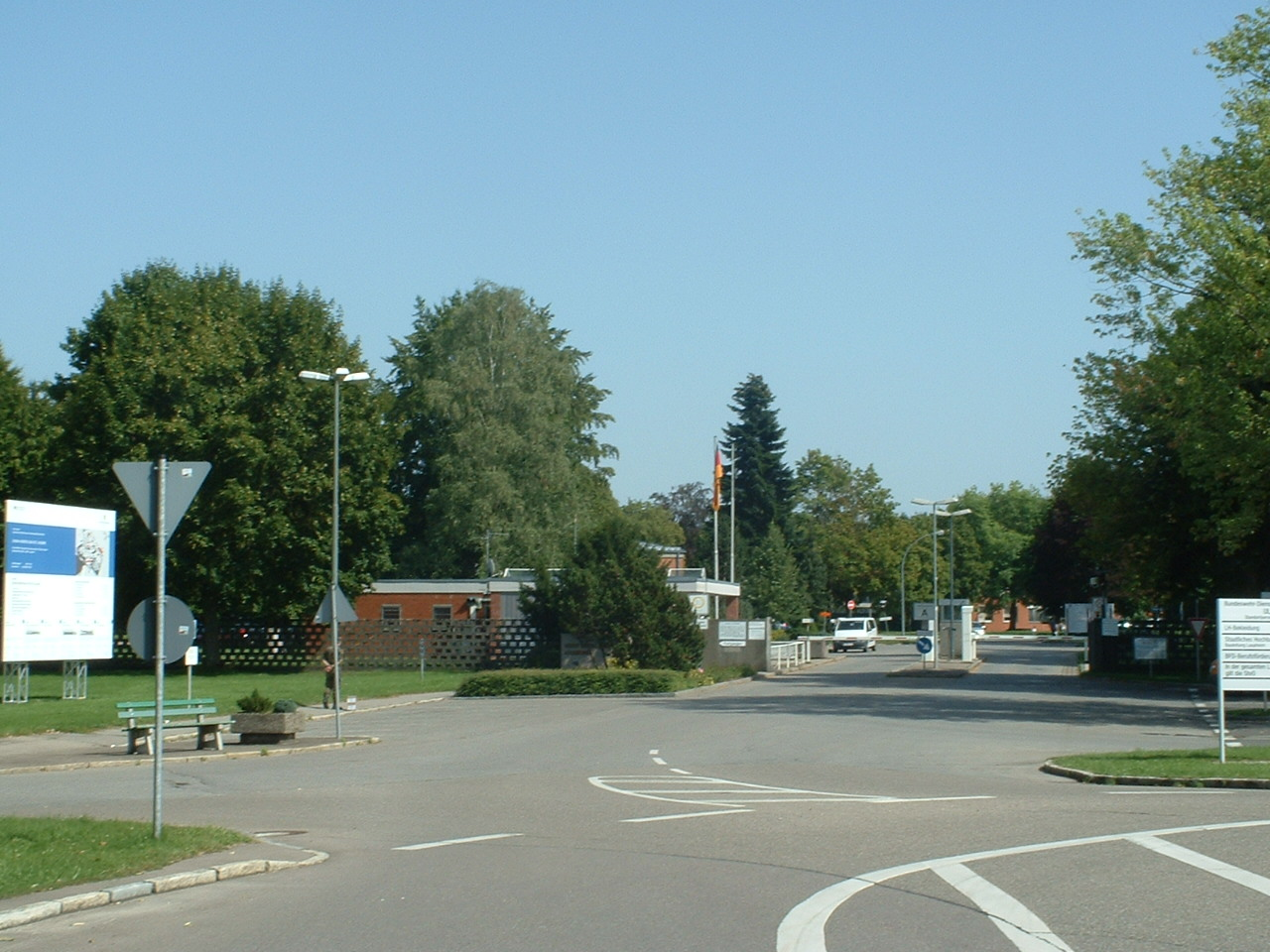
Entrance to Laupheim Air Base

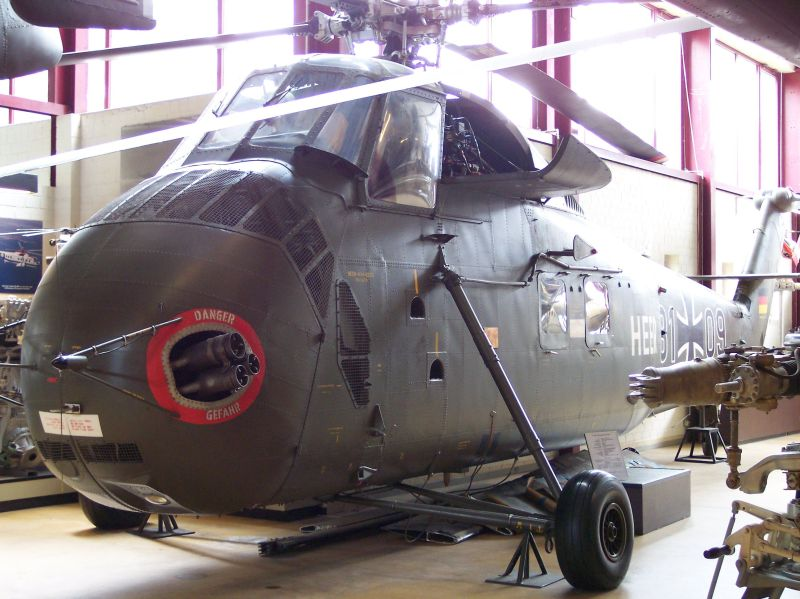
German Sikorsky H-34

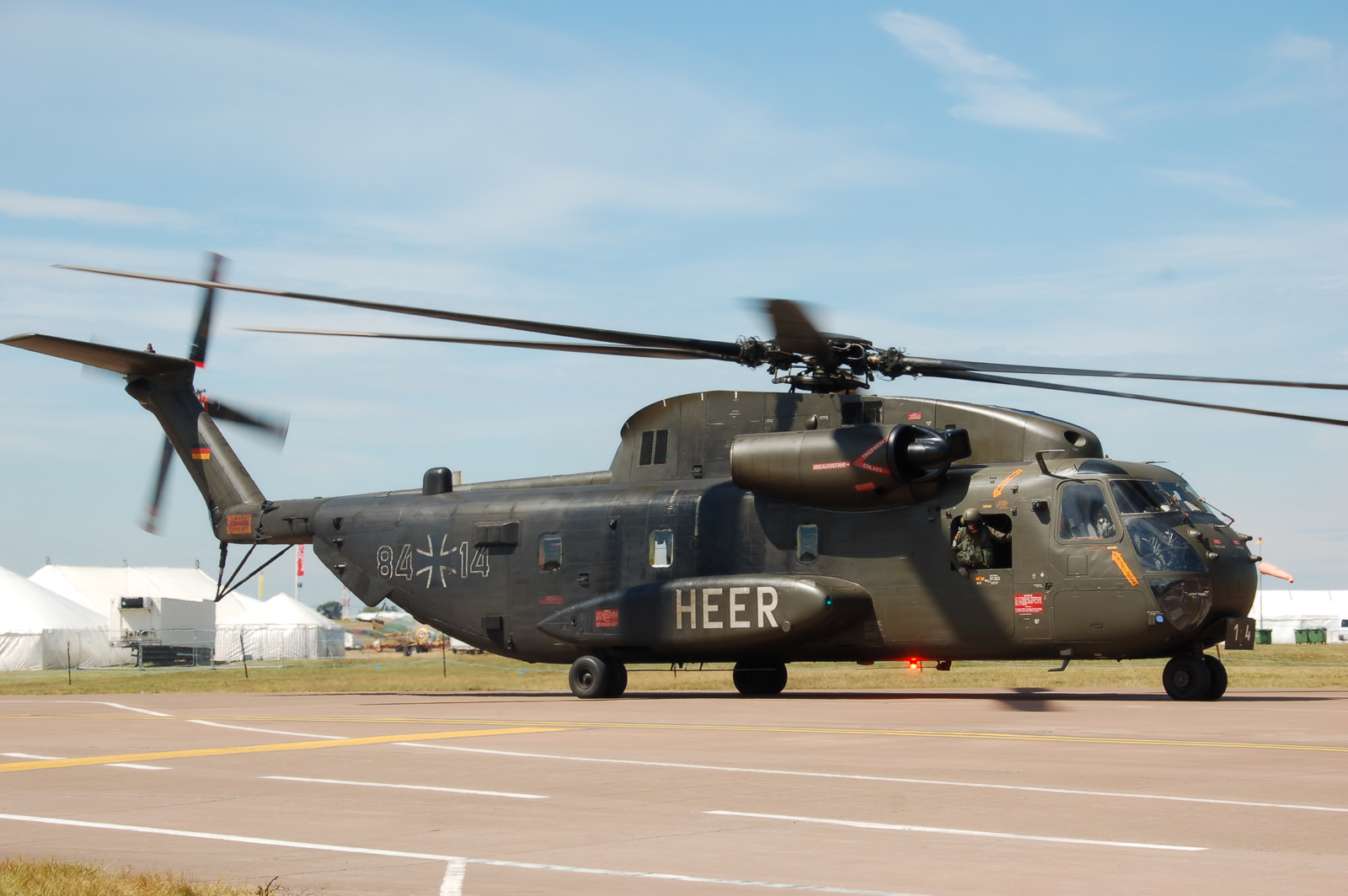
German CH-53G

== Structure ==
At the time of its disbanding Medium Transport Helicopter Regiment 25 consisted of a number of staff and support squadrons as well as a flying and a technical detachments:

- Staff Squadron Medium Transport Regiment 25
- Flying Detachment 251
  - 1st Squadron (Staff and Aerial Operations Squadron)
  - 2nd Squadron (Flying Squadron)
  - 3rd Squadron (Flying Squadron)
- Technical Detachment 252
  - 1st Squadron (Staff and Aerial Operations Squadron)
  - 2nd Squadron (Maintenance Squadron)
  - 3rd Squadron (Maintenance Squadron)
  - 4th Squadron (Repair Squadron)
- Army Aviation Support Squadron 255
- Army Aviation Squadron 259

== Equipment ==
Medium Transport Helicopter Regiment 25 flew the following helicopters:

- Sikorsky H-34 (1971 - 1973)
- Sikorsky CH-53 G/GS (1973 - 2012)

== History ==
Medium Transport Helicopter Regiment 25 was established at Laupheim Air Base on 1 April 1971, originally as Medium Army Aviation Transport Helicopter Regiment 25, with the disbanding of Army Aviation Battalion 200 and Army Aviation Maintenance Squadron 207. Both units formed the basis for the new regiment.

Originally equipped with helicopters of the type Sikorsky H-34, the first years of the regiment's existence were used to train pilots in various skills in order to enable them to fly helicopters of the type Sikorsky CH-53 G/GS, the first of which were brought into service in October 1973. The initial batch consisted of 32 helicopters and had been fully delivered by 1975.

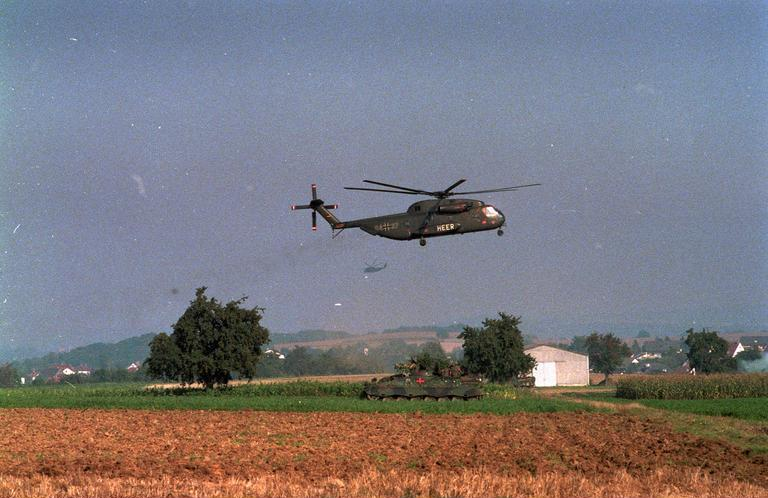
CH-53G during NATO exercise in 1986

Since its inception the regiment has been taking part in annual military exercises within the NATO structure but also with the French Army in the period following France's withdrawal from NATO's integrated military command in 1966 and France's return to full membership in 2009.

In the aftermath of the Friuli earthquake in May 1976 Medium Transport Helicopter Regiment 25 took part in the airlift operation to fly supplies into the Northern Italian disaster area.

In the course of a restructuring of the German Army, Medium Army Aviation Transport Helicopter Regiment 25 was renamed into Army Aviation Regiment 25 in 1979.

In 1985, members of the regiment were on voluntary work deployment for the German War Graves Commission in La Valbonne, France.

Following the Gulf War Army Aviation Regiment 25 provided humanitarian aid to Kurdish refugees in northern Iraq from April until the end of May 1991. Also starting in 1991, helicopters from the regiment were deployed in Iraq as part of UNSCOM. This mission ended in 1996.

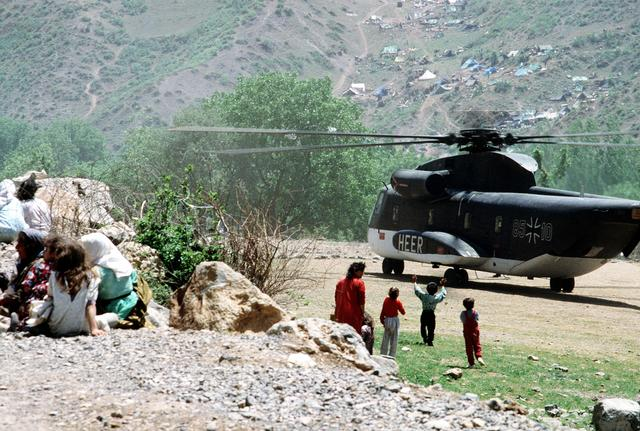
Kurdish refugee children run toward a CH-53G helicopter in Northern Iraq in 1991

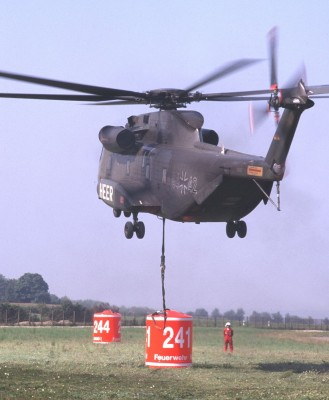
CH-53G picking up a "Smokey"

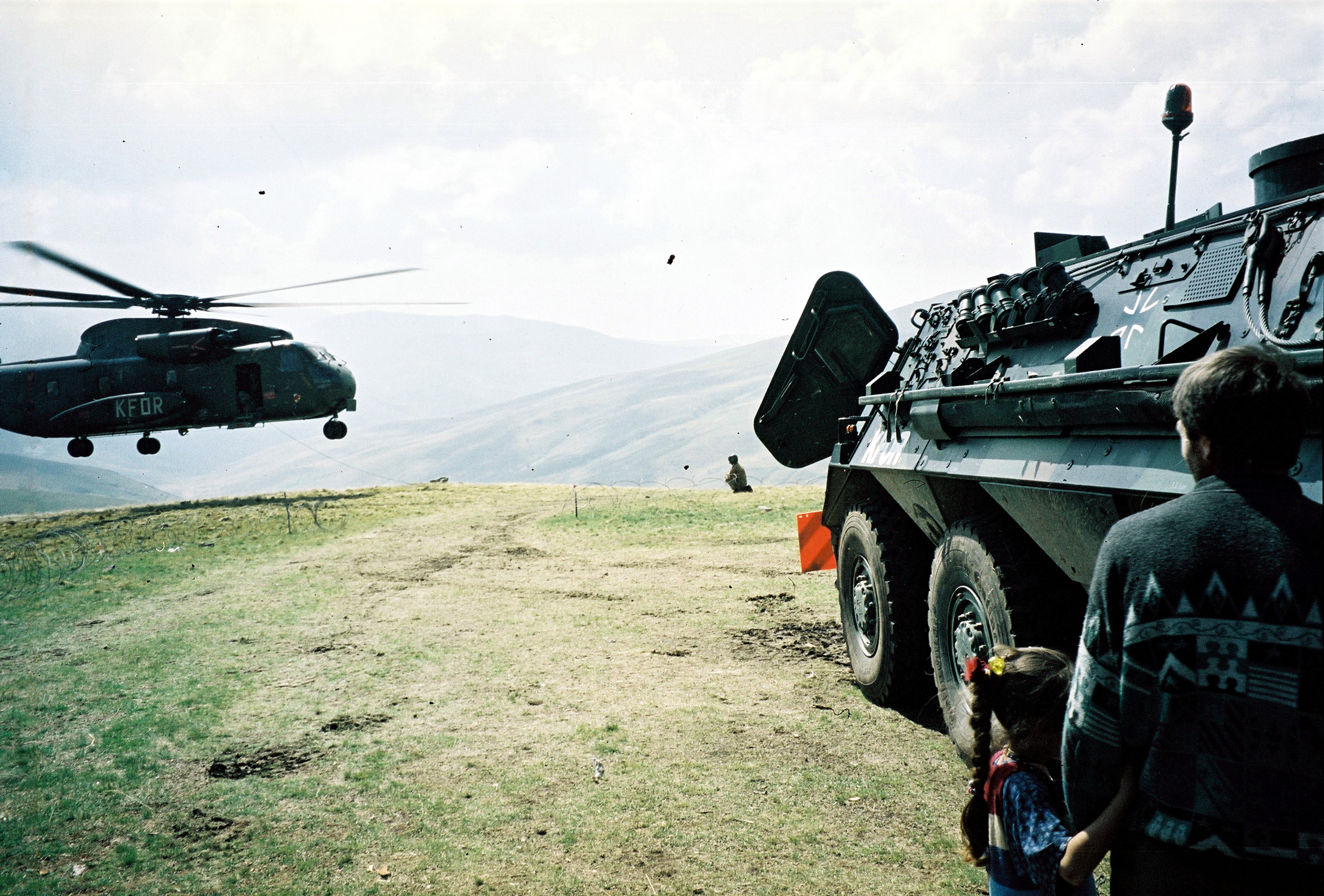
In Kosovo, 2001

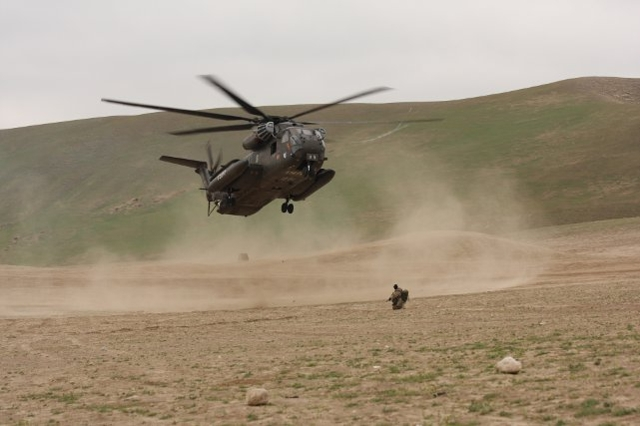
In Afghanistan, 2011

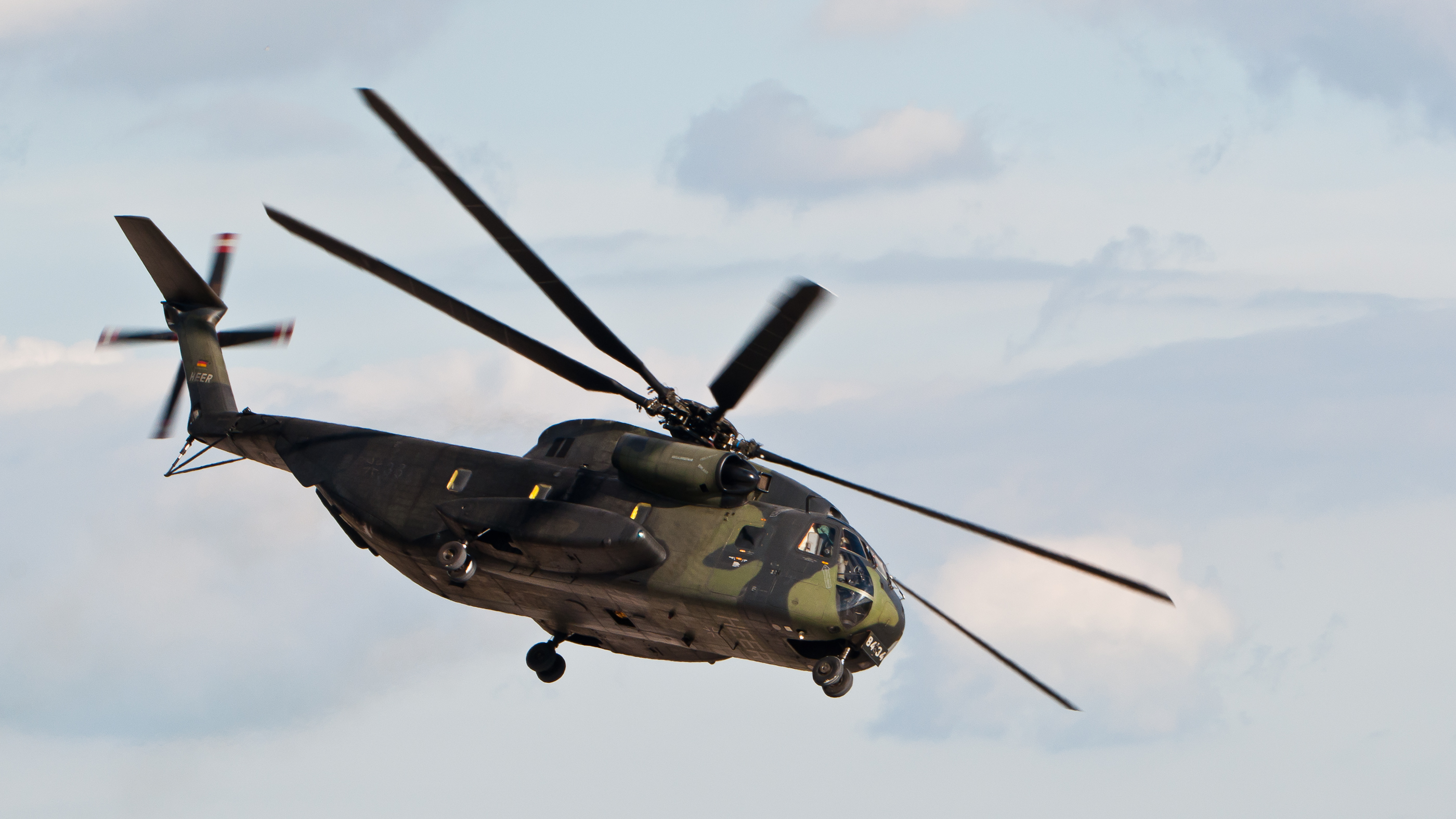
In 2012

During wildfires in Greece in the summer of 1993, five of the regiment's helicopters were deployed to Larissa at the end of August in order to assist the fire fighting efforts by using "Smokeys", water-filled containers hung under the helicopters, for fighting the conflagrations. When the mission ended on 26 October 1993, about 1200 fire fighting mission had been flown.

In 1994, after a restructuring of the German Armed Forces, during which a large number of bases were closed, Army Aviation Regiment 25 was given the honorary name Oberschwaben (i.e. Upper Swabia). In 1994, a number of Army Aviation units were disbanded. Some of the helicopters and personnel were subsequently assigned to Army Aviation regiments. Consequently, parts of Army Aviation Squadron 10, originally based at Neuhausen ob Eck Air Base, as well as parts of Mountain Army Aviation Squadron 8 from Landsberg-Lech Air Base, were relocated to Laupheim Air Base and integrated into Medium Transport Helicopter Regiment 25. Staff Squadron Army Aviation Command 2, already based at Laupheim Air Base, was also disbanded and assigned to Medium Transport Helicopter Regiment 25. All three squadrons were equipped with Bo 105M liaison and reconnaissance helicopters. Together they formed Staff and Air Operation Flying Detachment 251 and Staff Squadron Aeronautical Detachment 252. In 2003, these two detachments were separated from the regiment to form Army Aviation Support Squadron 10.

Since 1995, parts of the regiment has been deployed in the former Yugoslavia, first as part of the NATO-led multinational peacekeeping force IFOR in Bosnia and Herzegovina, flying missions into the most remote mountainous regions. The mission was later renamed SFOR. The participation of Army Aviation Regiment 25 ended in 2002.

Also in 1995, the regiment flew fire extinguishing missions in Attica, Greece.

In 1997, Army Aviation Regiment 25 provided disaster relief following the flooding of the river Oder.

During an outbreak of wildfire in Greece in 1998, Army Aviation Regiment 25 flew fire extinguishing missions from Tanagra, Boetia.

Five of the regiment's helicopters were employed to fly evacuation missions after the Galtür Avalanche in early 1999.

From 1999 to November 2003, Army Aviation Regiment 25 was part of the German contingent of the NATO-led international peacekeeping force in Kosovo, KFOR.

Since April 2002 Army Aviation Regiment 25 has been involved in ISAF, the NATO-led security mission in Afghanistan. At the beginning the unit was either based in Afghanistan proper or in neighbouring Uzbekistan at the air base of Termez but in November 2007 all helicopters moved their base to Mazar-i-Sharif, Northern Afghanistan.

The same year, the regiment provided disaster relief when the river Elbe and its tributaries burst its bank and caused widespread flooding. Also in 2002, Army Aviation Regiment 25 was incorporated into the Airmobile Operations Division (Division Luftbewegliche Operationen).

During the 2003 European heat wave, several missions were flown in Germany to extinguish wild fires. On 1 October 2003 the regiment acquired its final name, Medium Transport Helicopter Regiment 25, following a further restructuring of the German Armed Forces.

In the wake of the 2005 Kashmir earthquake, Medium Transport Helicopter Regiment 25 provided disaster relief to the stricken areas from October 2005 until April 2006.

From June until December 2006, three of the regiment's helicopters together with 227 personnel were stationed at Kinshasa as part of EUFOR RD Congo, the European Union force to support the United Nations Mission in the Democratic Republic of Congo (MONUC).

Following a series of massive forest fires in Greece in August 2007, three helicopters from Medium Transport Helicopter Regiment 25 as well as personnel from Rheine Air Base and Veitshöchheim flew numerous missions, distributing 1.3 million litres of extinguishing water in order to quench the fires.

In October 2011 the German Federal Ministry of Defence announced a reorganisation/reduction of the German Armed Forces. As a consequence, all helicopters of the type Sikorsky CH-53G were to be transferred to the German Air Force. Consequently, Medium Transport Helicopter Regiment 25 was disbanded on 31 December 2012 and re-established as new Helicopter Wing 64 on 1 January 2013. With a final muster and the taking down of the regimental flag on 5 March 2013, Medium Transport Helicopter Regiment 25 officially ceased to exist.

== Accidents and incidents ==
During its 31 years of existence Medium Transport Helicopter Regiment 25 had few accidents and incidents:

- On 11 December 1978, a CH-53G crashed at Laupheim Air Base. During landing and poor visibility the tail rotor hit the ground. Of the four occupants, one was killed.
- On 21 December 2002, a CH53G crashed near Kabul, killing all seven occupants amongst whom were three members of Medium Transport Helicopter Regiment 25: the pilot, Captain Friedrich Deininger, Sergeant Thomas Schiebel and Lance corporal Enrico Schmidt. An investigation following the accident concluded that the cause of the crash was due to mechanical failure.
- On 28 November 2008, a CH-53G crashed at an altitude of 2,600 metres (8,500 feet) near Engelberg, Switzerland during an exercise, injuring one of the six occupants.
- On 5 November, a CH-53 of Medium Transport Helicopter Regiment 25 had to make a controlled emergency landing due to a hydraulic problem near Waltenberg, part of the municipality of Ebershausen in Bavaria; of the four occupants, none were injured.
- On 19 February 2013, a CH-53 had to make a controlled emergency landing near Ingerkingen about 10 kilometres (6 miles) south-west of Laupheim Air Base due to a presumed technical problem; no casualties were reported.

== Coat of arms ==
Medium Transport Helicopter Regiment 25's role in air transport is depicted in its coat of arms by the winged horse Pegasus from Greek mythology. The shield is divided party per bend with the upper right held in azure, representing the medium of air in which the regiment operates, and with the lower left hld in argent, representing the earth. The Iron Cross symbolises the regiment's ties with the German Armed Forces. The bordure in Or represents the fact that Medium Transport Helicopter Regiment 25 is part of a corps.

== See also ==
- Army aviation
