= Niederstetten Air Base =

German Army and civil aerodrome, Niederstetten

Niederstetten Army Airfield Heeresflugplatz Niederstetten
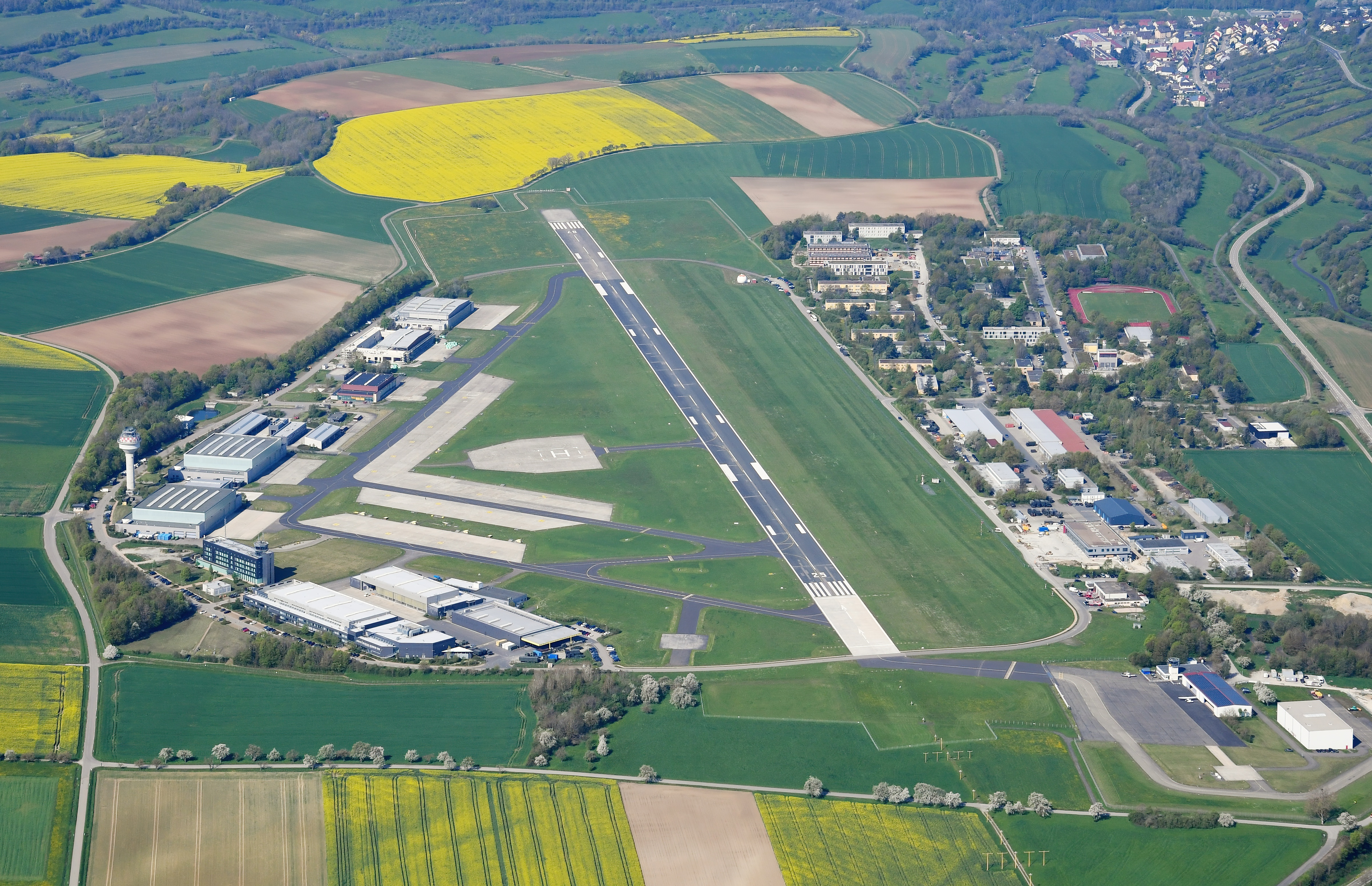
- IATA: none; ICAO: ETHN

Summary
- Airport type: Military/Civilian
- Owner: Federal Ministry of Defence
- Operator: German Army
- Location: Niederstetten
- Built: 1936
- Commander: Lieutenant Colonel Andreas Henne
- Occupants: German Army Aviation Corps
- Elevation AMSL: 1,535 ft (468 m)
- Coordinates: 49°24′03″N 09°55′05″E
- Interactive map of Niederstetten Army Airfield

Runways
Direction	Length		Surface
Direction	m	ft	Surface
07/25	1,391	4,383	Concrete

Niederstetten Air Base (German: Heeresflugplatz Niederstetten, ICAO: ETHN) is located 4 kilometres (2.5 mi) east of the city of Niederstetten in Northern Baden-Württemberg, Germany.

In 1936 construction of an air field for the Luftwaffe was completed. However, no permanent buildings and structures were erected, indicating that there were no plans for a permanent air field. The base was used during World War II by several Luftwaffe units including night fighters. After the end of World War II the air field was abandoned.

Beginning in 1957 works started to convert the former air force base into an air base to house units of the recently formed German Army's Aviation Corps, utilising the facilities of the previous occupant. These final works were completed in 1962 after which numerous units were stationed at Niederstetten Air Base.

Currently, the air base is home of Army Aviation Transport Helicopter Regiment 30 of the German Army. The regiment, which was relocated to Niederstetten in 1980, was part of German Army's Airmobile Operations Division, the division's headquarters being in Veitshöchheim. The division was dissolved in 2014, and Army Aviation Transport Helicopter Regiment 30 was subsequently integrated into Rapid Forces Division. Approximately 750 members of the armed forces are at present employed at the air base. However, due to further restructuring within the German Army Aviation Corps this number was increased by 600 in 2011.

Army Aviation Transport Helicopter Regiment 30 is equipped with helicopters of the type Bell UH-1D. These helicopters are being replaced by medium-sized NH90s, 32 of which will be stationed at Niederstetten Air Base. To accommodate the new aircraft an extensive building program started in 2007, the first result of which was the completion of a hangar to house 8 helicopters of the type NH90 in February 2008.

The air base is also used for civilian purposes, particularly for business flights and recreational purposes. In order to comply with EU regulations and to retain permission for civilian use, the runway was extended by 200 metres in 2011. To accommodate the new aircraft an extensive building program started in 2007.

== See also ==
- History of the German Army Aviation Corps
