= Holzdorf Air Base =

Airport in Germany

Holzdorf Air Base Fliegerhorst Holzdorf
- IATA: none; ICAO: ETSH

Summary
- Airport type: Military
- Operator: German Air Force (Luftwaffe)
- Location: Holzdorf / Schönewalde
- Elevation AMSL: 81 m (266 ft)
- Coordinates: 51°46.0722′N 013°10.0557′E

Map
- Location of Holzdorf Air Base in Germany

Runways
Direction	Length		Surface
Direction	m	ft	Surface
09/27	2,419	7,936	Concrete/Asphalt
- Source: Military AIP Germany, DAFIF

Holzdorf Air Base (German: Fliegerhorst Holzdorf) (ICAO: ETSH) is a military airfield operated by the German Air Force (Luftwaffe). It is located 1.8 nautical miles (3 km; 2 mi) east of Holzdorf, a subdivision of the municipality of Jessen in the German state of Saxony-Anhalt. It is also known as Schönewalde/Holzdorf Air Base, as most of the base is situated east of the Saxony-Anhalt/Brandenburg border, in the city of Schönewalde. The air base is home to the air forces's Helicopter Wing 64.

In 1968 the site was selected by the Air Forces of the National People's Army for a new airbase. The airbase was completed in 1974 and expanded into an operational airfield by 1980. The handover to the NVA's Jagdfliegergeschwader 1 took place at the beginning of November 1982, when it was relocated from Cottbus-Nord Airport to Holzdorf.

The airport is at an elevation of 265 feet (81 m) above mean sea level. It has one runway designated 09/27 with a concrete/asphalt surface measuring 2,419 by 30 metres (7,936 ft × 98 ft).

Support Squadron 1 of the German Army Aviation Corps was formerly located at Holzdorf. It was dissolved in 2013 as part of the reorganization/reduction of the Bundeswehr announced in October 2011.

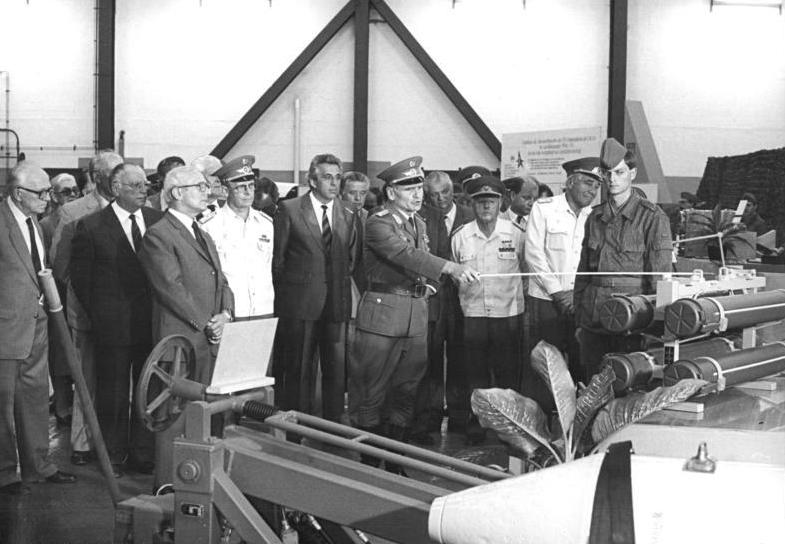
The General Secretary of the Central Committee of the SED and Chairman of the State Council of the GDR, Erich Honecker, Chairman of the National Defense Council of the GDR, visits the repair hall of the Fighter Wing 1 "Fritz Schmenkel," August 1985.

Construction of Arrow 3 infrastructure is expected to be completed by 2028.
