= German Army Aviation Corps =

Army Aviation Corps
- Heeresflieger
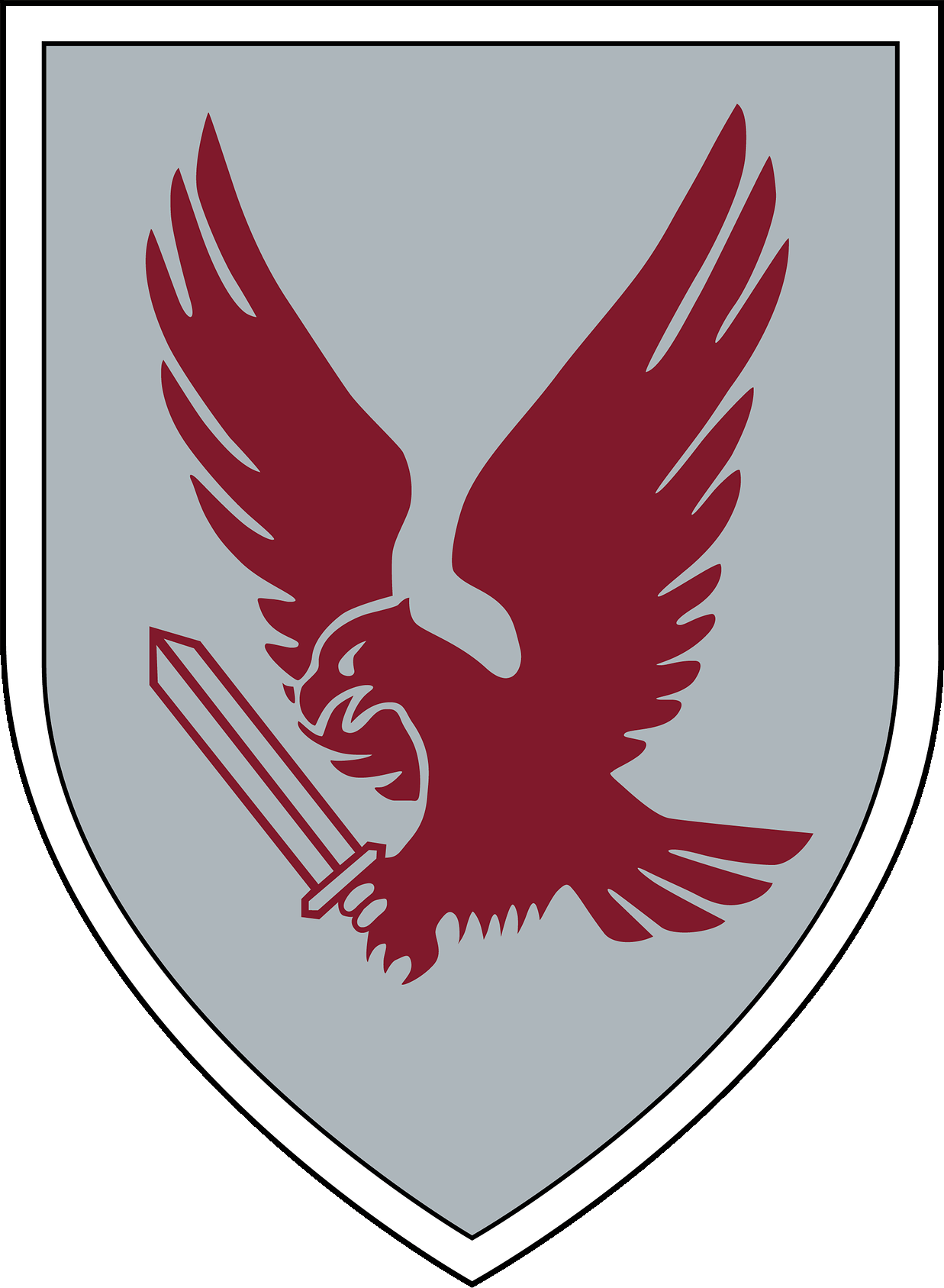
- Coat of Arms of Army Aviation Command
- Active: 1957–present
- Country: Germany
- Branch: German Army
- Type: Army aviation
- Role: Tactical Air Transport, Close Air Support, Reconnaissance, Liaison, Disaster Relief
- Size: 3 regiments, 1 independent squadrons, 1 school
- Mottos: Forward! Nach vorn!

Commanders
- Current commander: Brigadier General Volker Bauersachs

Insignia
- Roundel

- Fin flash

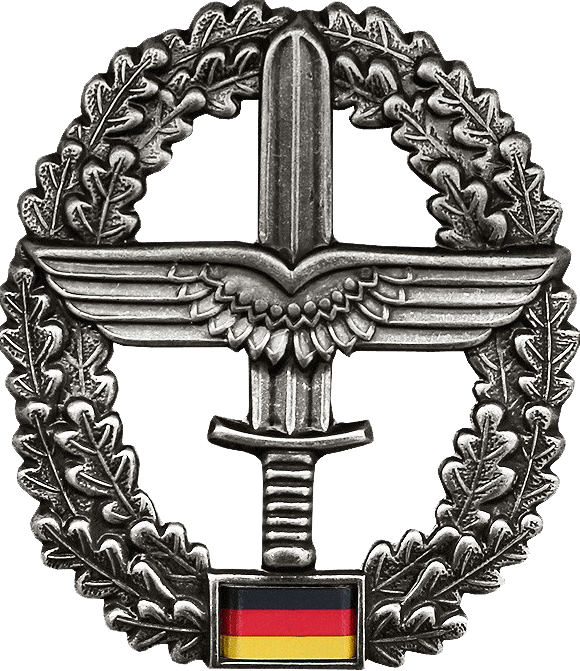
- Cap badge

- Collar patch

- APP-6A symbol

Aircraft flown
- Attack: Tiger
- Patrol: H145
- Trainer: H135
- Transport: NH90

The German Army Aviation Corps (German: Heeresfliegertruppe) is a special unit within the German Armed Forces (Bundeswehr). The German Army Aviation Corps is a branch of the German Army (Heer), containing all its helicopter units. The German Air Force and the German Navy both also have their own helicopter units.

== Identification ==
The coat of arms of the German Army Aviation Corps depicts a red eagle, swooping down whilst carrying a sword in its claws. Members of the Army Aviation Corps wear a burgundy-coloured beret. The badge on the beret is a wing, crossed vertically by a sword, surrounded by oak leaves. The Waffenfarbe of the German Army Aviation Corps ( a means the German military uses to distinguish between different corps or troop functions in its armed services) is silver-grey. The epaulettes of members of the German Army Aviation corps are lined in silver-grey. The gorget patches are held in the same color with two vertical cords. The sleeves of the uniforms display the flying wings, emphasising their main task.

== Tasks ==
The main tasks of the Army Aviation Corps are:

- support of own troops through anti-tank warfare.
- transport, both internally and externally, of personnel and material.
- reconnaissance in combination with other units.
- liaison between different units
- disaster relief, e.g. forest fires, floods etc.

Due to their manifold tasks, the German Army Aviation Corps cannot be classified as having any of the classic tasks of army units, namely leading and supporting the leadership, fighting and supporting the fighting force.

Most units of the Army Aviation Corps are incorporated into the Airmobile Operations Division (Division Luftbewegliche Operationen). This division was founded on 1 July 2002 and became operational on 8 October 2002.

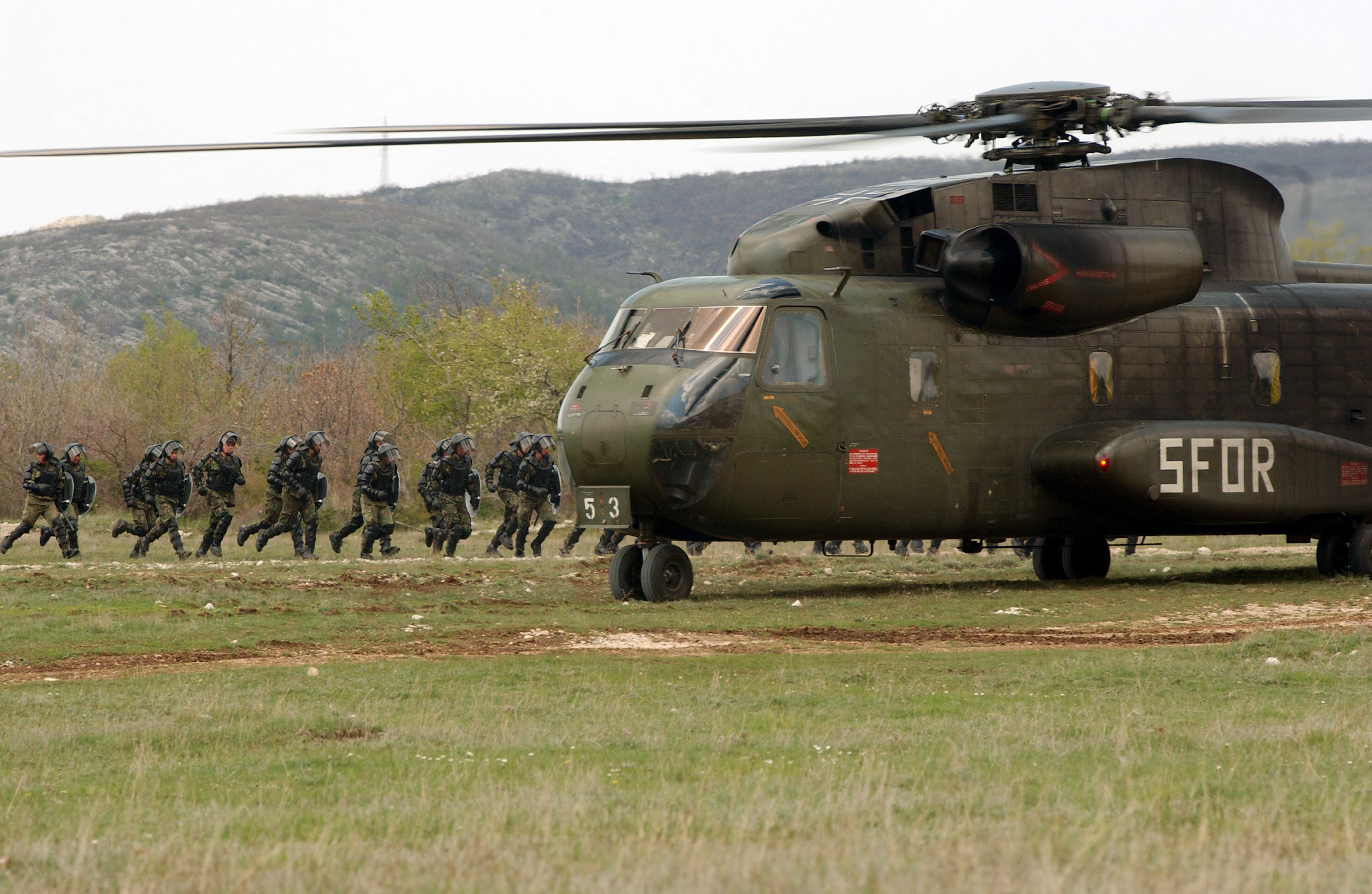
CH-53G of the German Army Aviation Corps during an exercise in Bosnia

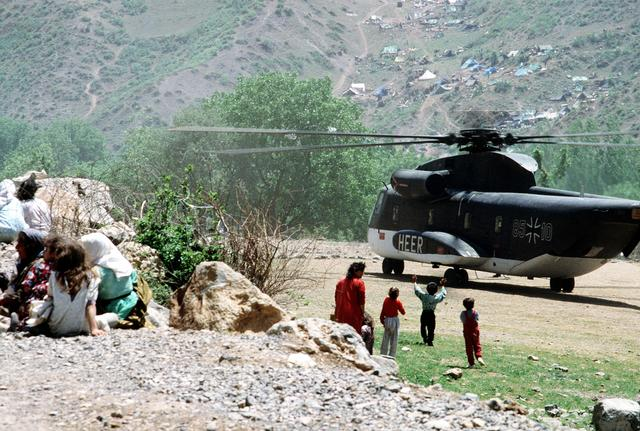
Kurdish refugee children run toward a CH-53G helicopter of the German Army Aviation Corps in Northern Iraq in 1991

== History ==
After the foundation of the Bundeswehr in 1955, the first head of the department of the German Army Aviation Corps, Colonel Horst Pape, was appointed on 7 November 1956. During the next ten years, a great number of bases all over the territory of the Federal Republic of Germany were founded.

In the first instance, all the equipment was acquired from allied nations. However, from the late 1960s onwards, more emphasis was put on developing new technology with other European partners. Until 1990, the German Army Aviation Corps was restricted to see active service only during aid mission within Germany and NATO countries.

Since the unification of the Federal Republic of Germany with the German Democratic Republic in 1990, there have been several rounds of re-organizations within the Bundeswehr, also affecting the German Army Aviation Corps. A number of bases were closed down, and their units either dissolved or merged with other units. In 2002, most remaining units of the German Army Aviation Corps were incorporated into the Airmobile Operations Division (Division Luftbewegliche Operationen) .

Furthermore, the role of the German Army Aviation Corps changed as well. Since the mid-1990s, it has been increasingly deployed in a support role in several countries for as varying bodies as the United Nations, NATO and the EU, first in Iraq after the 1st Gulf War, then on the Balkans with IFOR, KFOR, SFOR and EUFOR, and most recently in Afghanistan as part of ISAF and most recently in the Democratic Republic of the Congo as part of EUFOR RD Congo to support the UN mission MONUC to monitor the general elections in 2006. This mission began in June 2006 and ended with the last soldiers returning in December of the same year.

In October 2011 the German Federal Ministry of Defence announced a reorganisation/reduction of the German Armed Forces. As a consequence, the strength of Germany Army Aviation Corps was reduced. Flying operations at a number of air bases ceased and the respective units were dissolved. Other units were transferred to the German Air Force.

Since 2020 the German Army Aviation Corpse consists of one brigade level unit called Helicopter Command. This Brigade belongs to the Rapid Forces Division and is made up of three regiments, one school, brigade staff HQ and central support and maintenance center.

== Equipment ==
=== Fleet ===
Model	Image	Origin	Role	Quantity	Notes
Combat helicopter
Eurocopter EC665 Tiger UHT		Germany; France; Spain	Attack helicopter	51	From the 68 delivered, 51 are in active service. Among the remaining 17 helicopters: 15 used as a spare parts reserve.; 2 were lost, one in Mali in July 2017 (74+29), one in Germany in March 2013(74+27).
Airbus H145M LKH; Leichter Kampfhubschrauber		Germany	Multirole attack helicopter / training helicopter	0 (+ 72 on order)	72 H145M LKH ordered by the German Army, they are planned to be split the following way: 39 for an active combat role; 33 for a training / professionalisation role.Detail of the orders; 62 ordered with an option for 20 helicopters in December 2023.; 57 for the German Army; 5 for the KSK (under the German Air Force); 20 ordered in December 2025: 15 for the German Army; 5 for the KSK (under the German Air Force); The first delivery to the air force was made in 2026, with a first batch of two aircraft, none for the Army yet.
Transport and utility helicopters
NH90 TGEA; TTH German Army		Germany; France; Italy; Netherlands	Utility helicopter	40	
NH90 TGEE; TTH German Enhanced		Germany; France; Italy; Netherlands	Utility helicopter	42	Based on TGEA variant, with added systems: Emergency ditching system; 2 additional decoy magazines for the self-protection system (6 instead of 4); 5th multifunctional display
Airbus H145 LUH SAR; Light utility helicopter, search and rescue		Germany	Search and rescue	8	The H145 LUH SAR replaced the UH-1 Iroquois in the same role. The deliveries took place from 2019 to 2021
Training aircraft
Airbus H135; EC 135T1 variant		Germany	Training helicopter	14	14 in service since 2000.
Airbus H135		Germany	Training helicopter	5	Rented from Airbus and ADAC since 2018. To be replaced by the newly acquired H145M.

=== Aircraft weapons ===
Model	Image	Origin	Type	Used with	Quantity	Notes
Missiles
ATAS; Air-to-air Stinger		United States	Air-to-air missile	EC665 Tiger UHT	–	Missile used with the EC665 Tiger, operated on 2-missile pods.
MBDA PARS 3LR; Panzerabwehr-Raketensystem der dritten Generation mit langer Reichweite		Germany; France	ATGM; Anti-tank guided missile	EC665 Tiger UHT	680	Missile developed for the EC665 Tiger, operated on 4-missile pods. 680 missiles purchased by the German Army. Range: > 7 km (4.3 mi)
Euromissile HOT-3		France; Germany	ATGM; Anti-tank guided missile	EC665 Tiger UHT	–	Missile used with the EC665 Tiger, operated on 4-missile pods.
Rockets
FZ Rocket system FZ71, Fz181, FZ122, FZ149		Belgium; Germany	Unguided helicopter rocketa (70 mm)	EC665 Tiger UHT / H145M LKH	–	Rocket manufactured by Rheinmetall, in collaboration with Thales Belgium, Contract in 2022 for 7'620 rockets for €19.92 million. a a a Rocket pods: 7×70mm (FZ233/FZ220); 12×70mm (FZ231/FZ219); 19×70mm (FZ225/FZ207)
Cannons and machine guns
FN M3P Browning; Sch MG M3P		Belgium	Gun pod (12.7×99mm NATO)	EC665 Tiger UHT	–	The pod contains 400 cartridges.
POD NC 621		France	Cannon pod (20×102 mm)	Airbus H145M LKH	–	
FN M3M Mk3		Belgium	Side-door machine gun (12.7×99mm NATO)	NH90 TTH	50	50 machine guns ordered by the Bundeswehr for the NH90 in 2020, delivered in 2021-22.
Heckler & Koch 121; MG5A2		Germany	Side-door machine gun (7.62×51mm NATO)	NH90 TTH	–	

== Units ==
Currently active regiments as part of Helicopter Command:

Name of unit	Flying	Based at	Insignia	Note
Transport Helicopter Regiment 10 Lüneburger Heide	NH90	Faßberg		
Transport Helicopter Regiment 30 Tauberfranken	NH90 H145	Niederstetten		
Attack Helicopter Regiment 36 Kurhessen	Eurocopter Tiger	Fritzlar		

The following units were subordinate to Airmobile Operations Division, the division's headquarters being in Veitshöchheim:

Name of unit	Flying	Based at	Insignia	Note
Medium Transport Helicopter Regiment 15 Münsterland	Sikorsky CH-53G/GS	Rheine		Disbanded
Medium Transport Helicopter Regiment 25 Oberschwaben	Sikorsky CH-53G/GS	Laupheim		Transferred to German Air Force
Transport Helicopter Regiment 30 Tauberfranken	NH90 H145	Niederstetten		

The following units were part of Airmobile Brigade 1 of Airmobile Operations Division. The division's headquarters was in Fritzlar:

Name of unit	Flying	Based at	Insignia	Note
Light Transport Helicopter Regiment 10 Lüneburger Heide	NH90	Faßberg		
Attack Helicopter Regiment 26 Franken	MBB Bo 105P	Roth		Disbanded 30 June 2014
Attack Helicopter Regiment 36 Kurhessen	Eurocopter Tiger	Fritzlar		

The following unit was not part of the Airmobile Operations Division but part of Air Transport Wing 62:

Name of unit	Flying	Based at	Insignia	Note
Army Aviation Support Squadron 1	Bell UH-1D	Holzdorf		Disbanded 31 December 2013

The following units operated independently:

Name of unit	Flying	Based at	Insignia	Note
Army Aviation Maintenance Squadron 100		Celle		Disbanded
Army Aviation Squadron 109		Celle		Disbanded
Army Aviation Liaison and Reconnaissance Squadron 109	MBB Bo 105M	Celle		Disbanded

The following units are or were part of the Army Aviation School. The school's headquarters is in Bückeburg:

Name of unit	Based at	Insignia	Note
Instruction Group A (flying instruction)	Bückeburg		
Instruction Group B (non-flying instruction)	Bückeburg		
Training Centre C (flying instruction)	Celle		To be disbanded
Army Aviation Test Squadron 910	Bückeburg		Disbanded on 31 December 2008
Research And Development Group	Bückeburg		
Technical Maintenance Department	Bückeburg		
Franco-German Training Centre	Le Luc (France)		

== See also ==
- History of the Army Aviation Corps (Germany)
- Army aviation
