= Laupheim Air Base =

Air base in Germany

Laupheim Air Base Militärflugplatz Laupheim
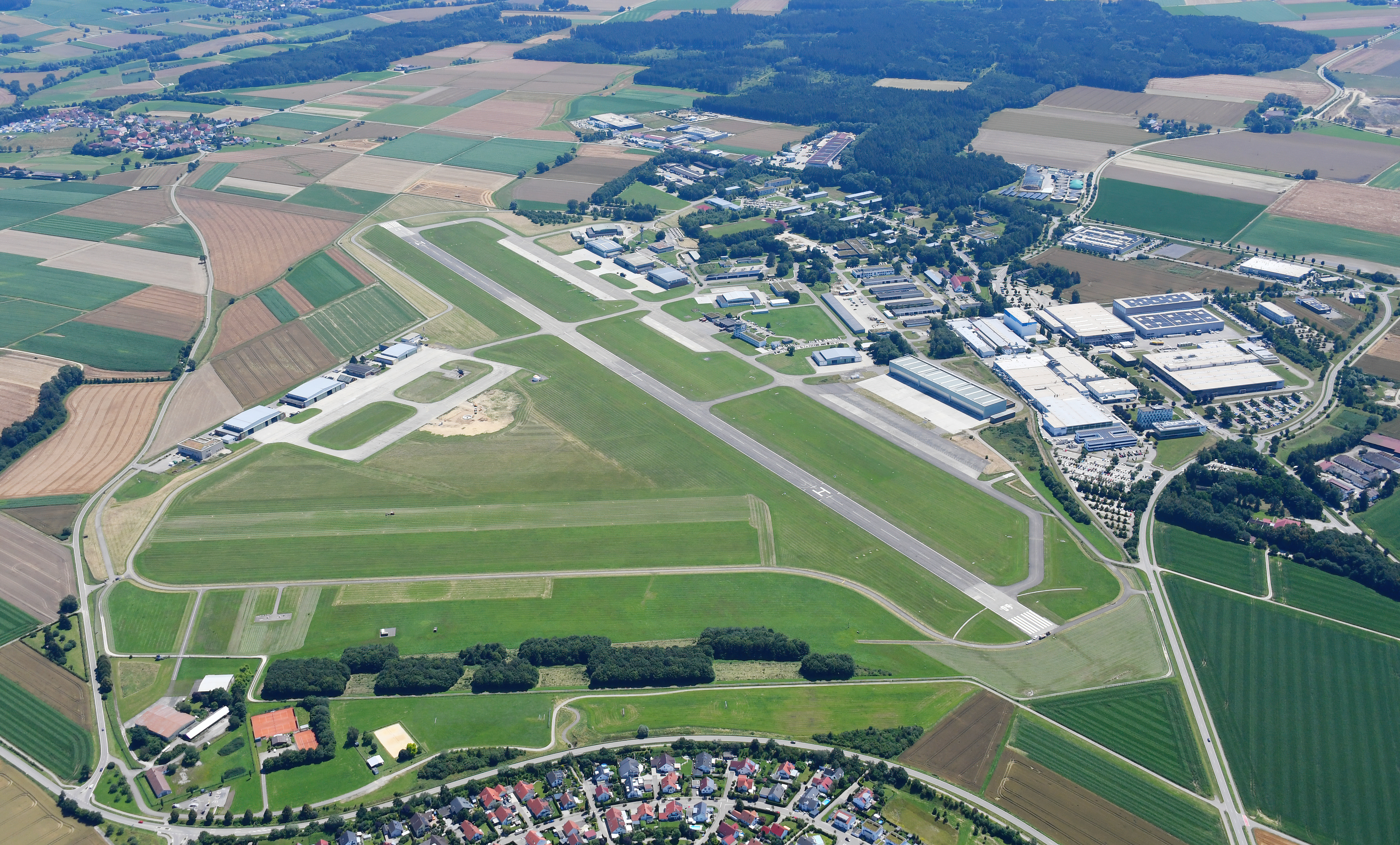
- IATA: none; ICAO: ETHL

Summary
- Airport type: Military
- Owner: Federal Ministry of Defence
- Operator: German Air Force
- Location: Laupheim
- Built: 1940
- In use: 1940 - 1945; 1964 - present
- Commander: Colonel Stefan Demps
- Occupants: Helicopter Wing 64
- Elevation AMSL: 1,765 ft / 538 m
- Coordinates: 48°13′13″N 009°54′36″E
- Interactive map of Laupheim Air Base

Runways
Direction	Length		Surface
Direction	m	ft	Surface
09/27	1,646	5,400	Asphalt
03/21	600	1,969	Grass

Laupheim Air Base (German: Militärflugplatz Laupheim, ICAO: ETHL) is a German Air Force base located close to the city of Laupheim, Baden-Württemberg, Germany. It is home to Helicopter Wing 64 which has 48 of its 60 helicopters stationed at the airbase together with 1,200 personnel.

== Pre-1945 ==
In August 1938, works began to establish a base for the Luftwaffe in the vicinity of Laupheim. These works were completed in March 1940. During World War II, several units of the Luftwaffe were based in Laupheim, including a training unit, a wing of nightfighters, and a wing of zerstörers. Additionally, a small production plant for the Focke Achgelis Fa 223 Drache twin-rotor helicopter prototype was also placed on the air base.

On 19 July 1944, the air force base was attacked by 45 B-24 bombers of the United States Army Air Forces (USAAF) 8th Air Force, dropping 115 tons of explosives and incendiary devices, while escorting fighter aircraft attacked the air base in low-level flight. The raid caused considerable damage, completely destroying ten planes (seven Messerschmitt Bf 110, one Arado Ar 96 and one Messerschmitt Bf 108). Four other planes were partially damaged. The technical equipment of the air force units, a hangar, barracks and air traffic control, as well as three previously completed helicopters of the type Focke-Achgelis Fa 223 were destroyed. An anti-aircraft unit received a direct hit, killing one soldier and injuring four. Two days later, another anti-aircraft unit shot down a B-24 bomber which had sustained considerable damage during an air raid on Munich, therefore flying at low level. The crew managed to bail out but due to heavy shelling by anti-aircraft units, the roof of the church in nearby Baustetten received considerable damage.

The next attack took place on 31 July 1944. Eleven USAAF P-51 Mustangs carried out a low-level attack, completely destroying two Messerschmitt Bf 110 and an Italian trainer and damaging two further Messerschmitt Bf 110. Consequently, the anti-aircraft units stationed around the air base were beginning to get nervous, so that, when on 9 August 1944, 28 planes suddenly appeared from the direction of Schwendi, these units instantly opened fire, managing to shoot down one plane. However, the planes were German aircraft of 4th Fighter Wing "Udet", equipped with Focke-Wulf Fw 190. After that, the production plant of Focke-Achgelis was evacuated to Ochsenhausen. On 26 November 1944, ten P-47 Thunderbolt attacked the air force base causing only slight damage.

On 2 April 1945, 2nd Group of 53rd Fighter Wing, flying Messerschmitt Bf 109, was transferred to Laupheim. On 18 April and 19 April 1945, the base was attacked yet again, as a result of which one soldier was killed. The following day, the base came under heavy attack by French bombers and their protecting aircraft, destroying or severely damaging all planes stationed on the base. On 21 April 1945, the remnants of 2nd Group of 53rd fighter Fighter Wing were transferred to Schongau in Bavaria.

On 23 April 1945, French armed forces occupied Laupheim and the airbase.

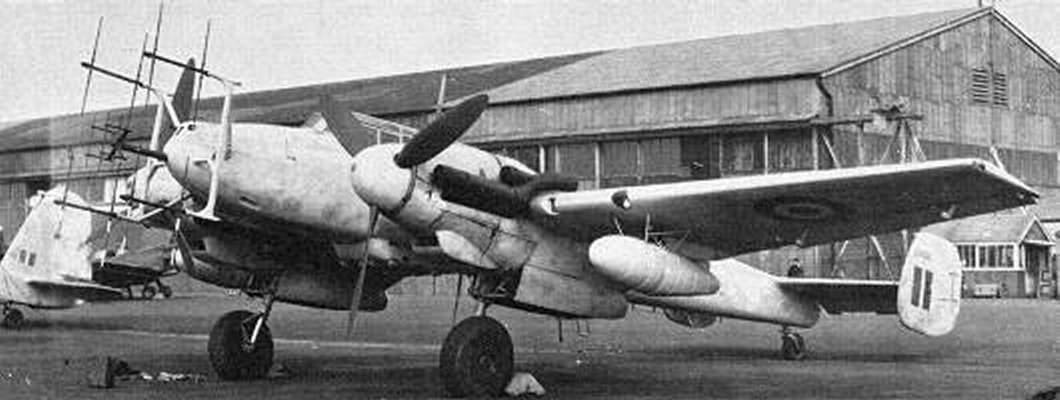
Me Bf 110

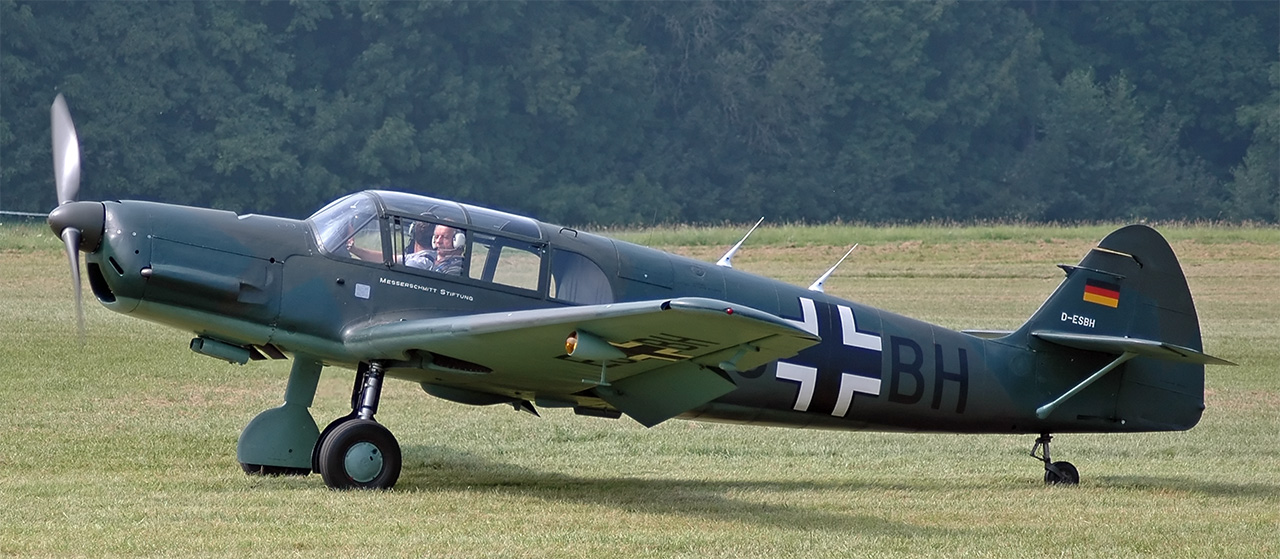
Me Bf 108

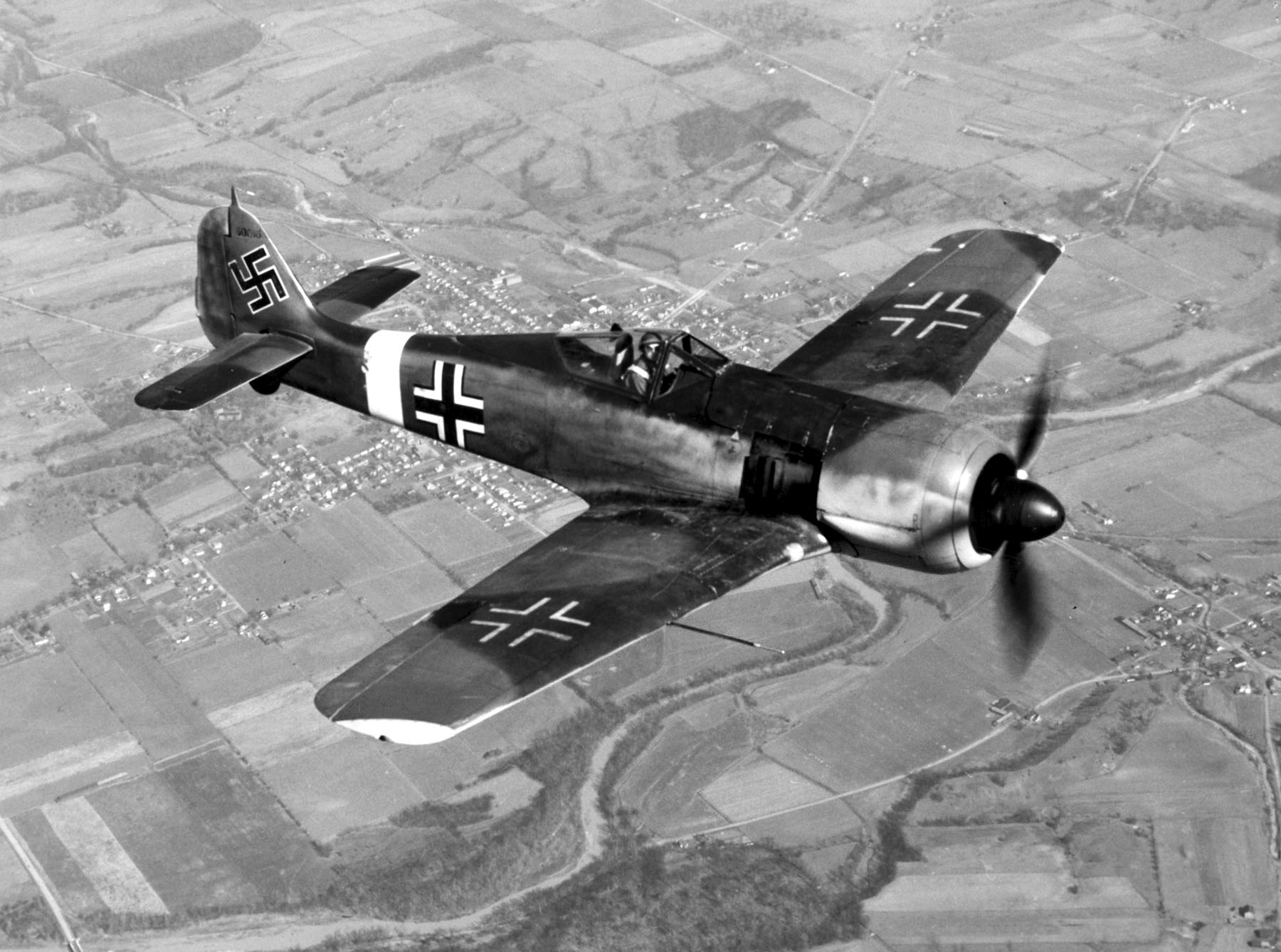
Focke-Wulf Fw 190

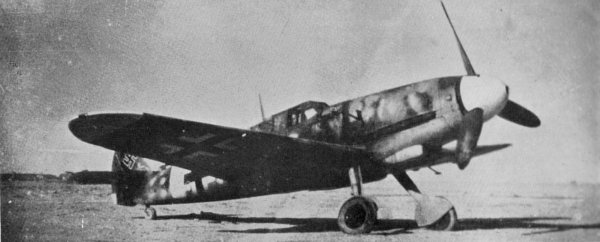
Messerschmitt Bf 109G

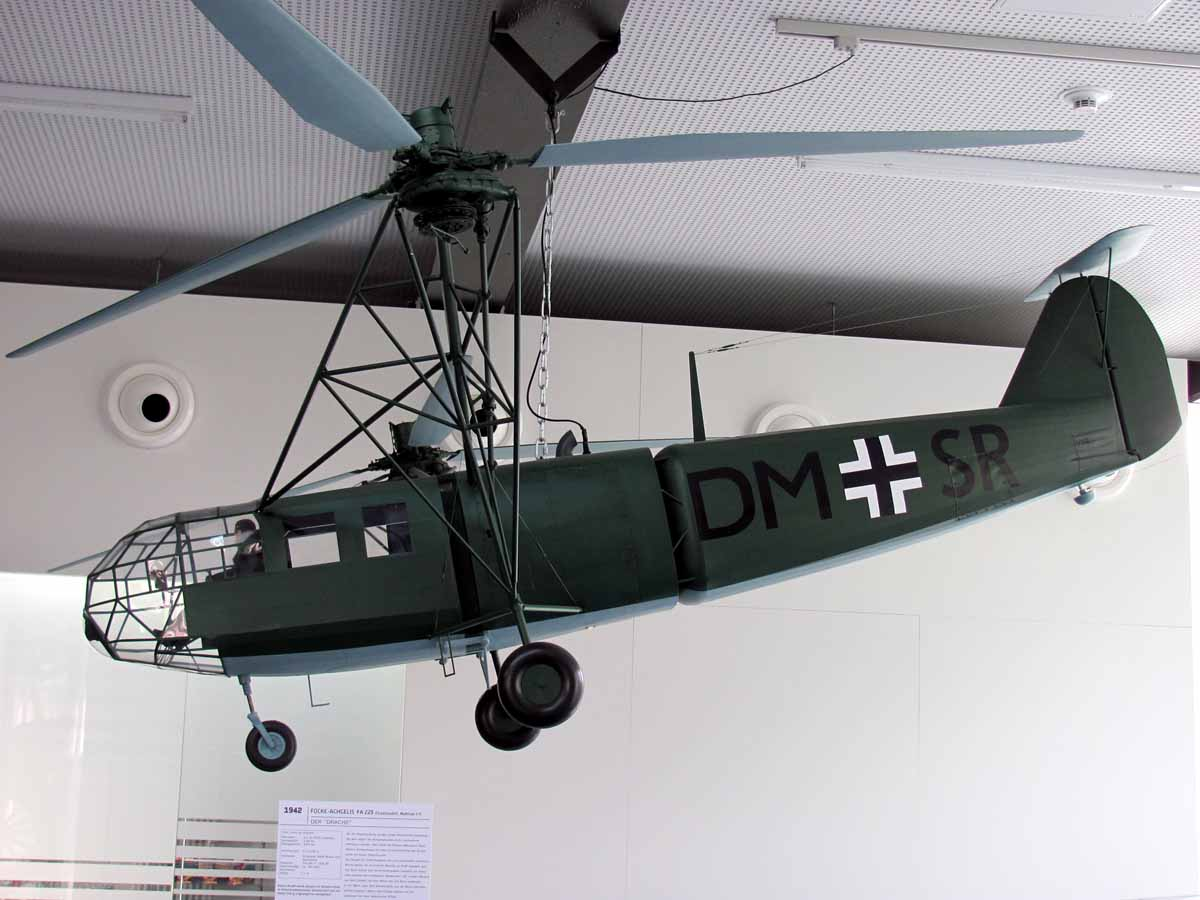
Focke-Achgelis Fa 223

== Post-1945 ==
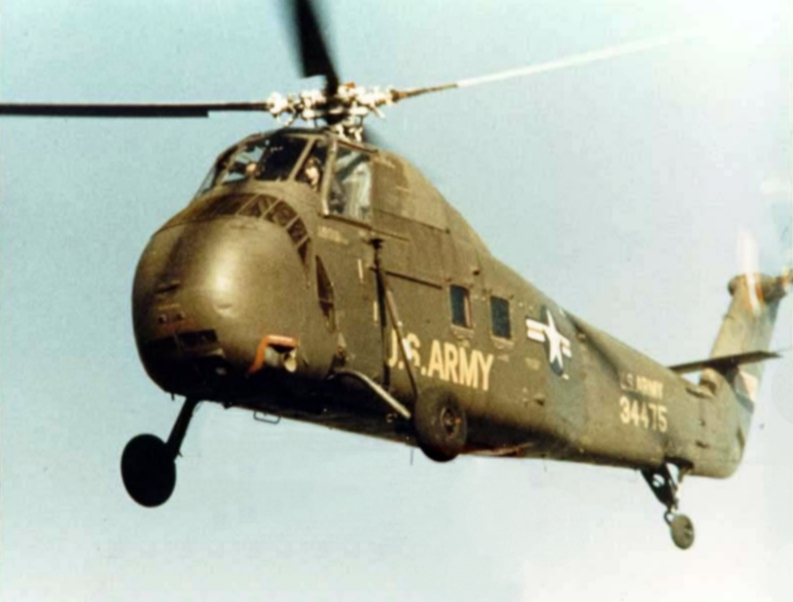
H-34

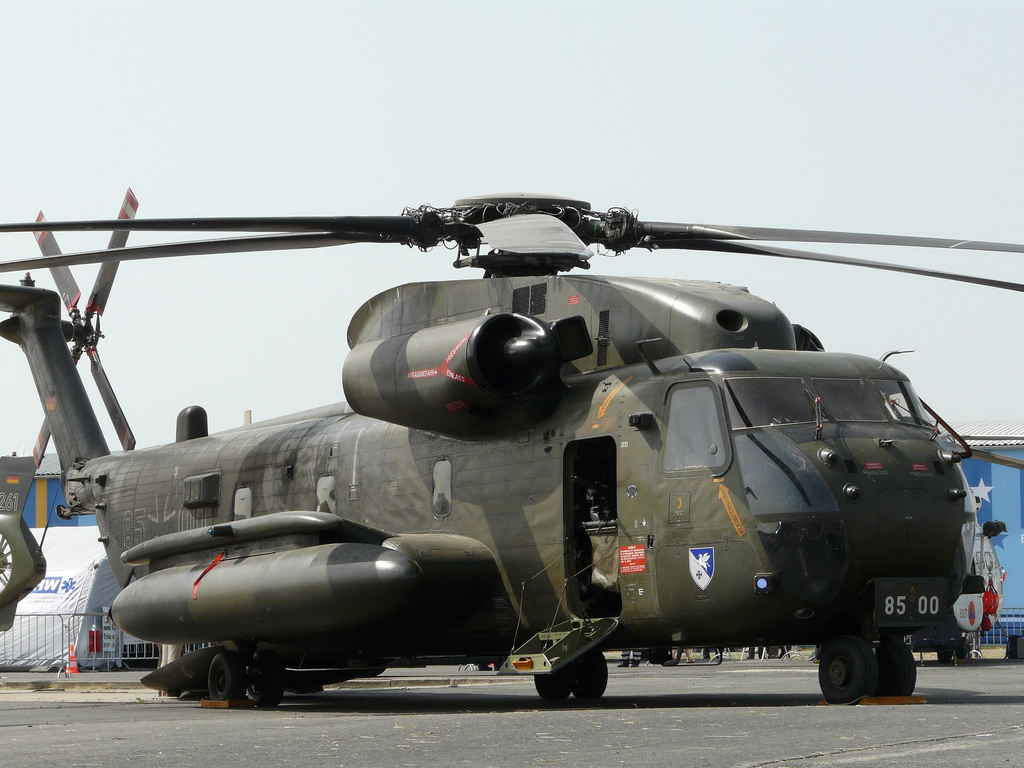
CH-53 from Laupheim

On the grounds of the former Luftwaffe base, completely new military installations were constructed in 1964, designated to house helicopters of the German Army Aviation Corps. While the building works were still in progress, the General Staff moved the headquarters of German Army Aviation Corps Command 2 from Ulm to Laupheim.

Operational flying started soon afterwards and the first helicopters stationed on the base were Sikorsky H-34.

In 1971, following a period of continuous growth of German Army Aviation Corps, a reorganisation of all the units in southern West Germany took place, which resulted in Laupheim becoming the headquarters of all German Army Aviation Corps units in southern Germany. Army Aviation Battalion 200 and Army Aviation Maintenance Squadron 207 already based in Laupheim were merged to form German Army Aviation Corps Medium Army Aviation Transport Helicopter Regiment 25.

In 1973, the CH-53G replaced the by now obsolete Sikorsky H-34 and has been in service ever since.

In the course of a restructuring of the German Army, Medium Army Aviation Transport Helicopter Regiment 25 was renamed into Army Aviation Regiment 25 in 1979.

In the following period, helicopters from Laupheim saw more than 120.000 hours in action in as different places as Italy, Greece, the Pyrenees and the Alps, mainly by offering help and logistic support after natural disasters.

On 21 June 1989, the base was officially named Kurt Georg Kiesinger Barracks after the former Chancellor of Germany, a Swabian himself.

With the closure of Neuhausen ob Eck Air Base and the disbanding of the units stationed there, German Army Aviation Corps Regiment 20 and Army Aviation Squadron 10, some of the helicopters from Army Aviation Squadron 10, flying Bo 105M, were transferred to Laupheim Airbase to form Army Aviation Support Squadron 10. Later, this squadron was also dissolved and its helicopters incorporated into German Army Aviation Corps Army Aviation Regiment 25. In the same year, Headquarters of German Army Aviation Corps Command 2 in Laupheim was discontinued and the base together with its staff was incorporated into a new command structure.

Beginning in the early 1990s, helicopters from the Army Aviation Regiment 25 saw active service in as various part as the Balkans, Iraq, Afghanistan and Democratic Republic of the Congo under the auspices of either NATO, the UN or the EU. In 1994, after a further restructuring of the Bundeswehr, during which a large number of bases were closed, Army Aviation Regiment 25 was given the honorary name Oberschwaben (i.e. Upper Swabia), this being a result of the German Army's continuing commitment to the base.

In 2002, Army Aviation Regiment 25 was incorporated into the Airmobile Operations Division (Division Luftbewegliche Operationen).

On 1 October 2003 the regiment acquired its final name, Medium Transport Helicopter Regiment 25, following a further restructuring of the German Armed Forces.

In October 2011 the German Federal Ministry of Defence announced a reorganisation/reduction of the German Armed Forces. As a consequence, Airmobile Operations Division will be dissolved and Laupheim Air Base together with its helicopters will be transferred to the German Air Force. German Army Aviation Corps Medium Transport Regiment 25 was disbanded on 5 March 2013 and formally integrated into the Air Forces's Helicopter Wing 64 . The official transfer took place on 1 January 2013.

== See also ==
- History of the German Army Aviation Corps
- List of airports in Germany
