= Friedberger Ach =

River in Germany

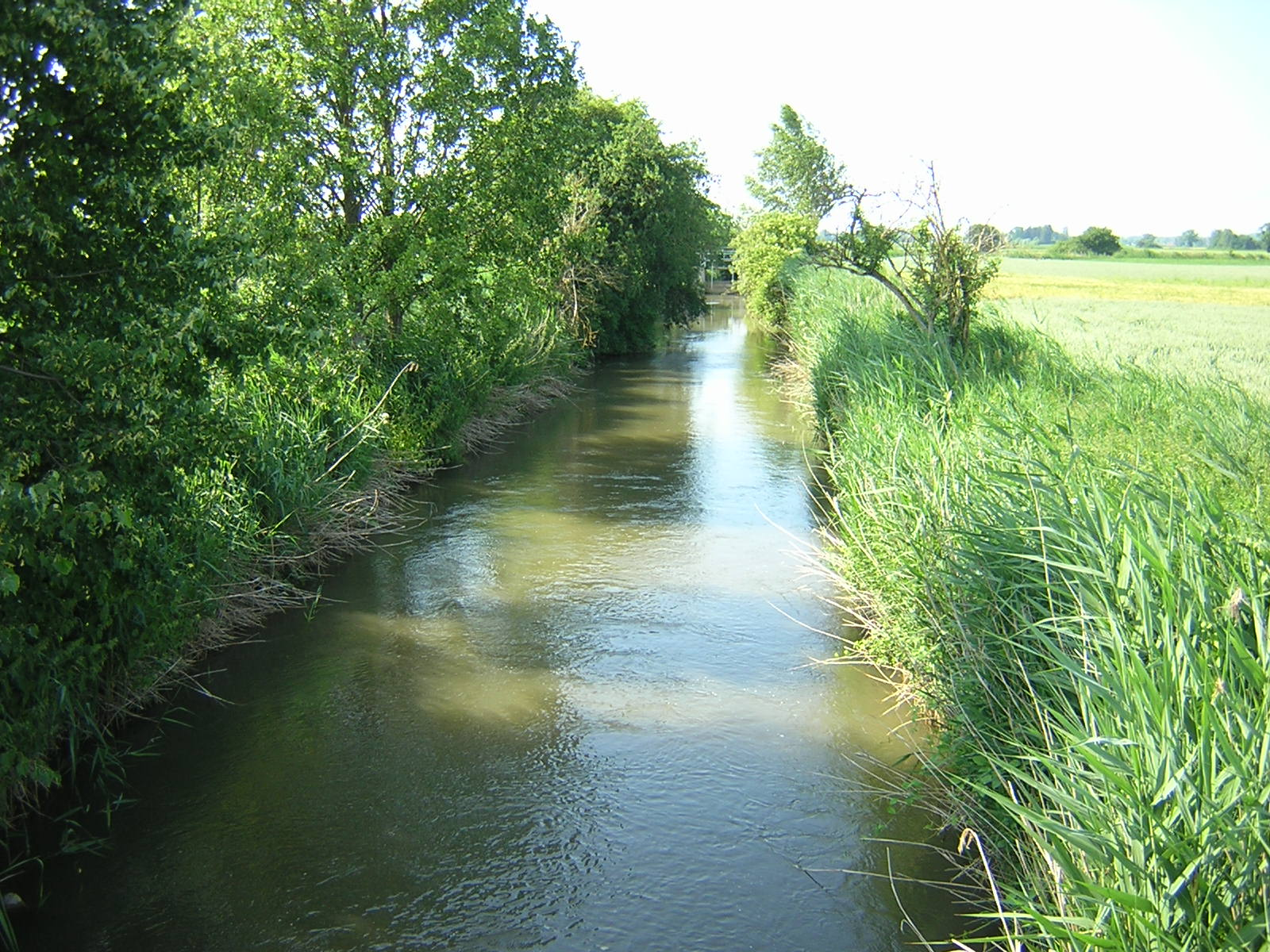
- The Friedberger Ach about 3.5 km before Thierhaupten

Location
- Country: Germany
- State: Bavaria
- Reference no.: DE: 1312

Physical characteristics
- Source
  - location: near Penzing-Untermühlhausen
  - coordinates: 48°05′10″N 10°54′19″E
  - elevation: ca. 600 m
- Mouth
  - location: near Rennertshofen-Stepperg into the Danube
  - coordinates: 48°44′15″N 11°03′42″E
  - elevation: ca. 385 m
- Length: 100.4 km (62.4 mi)
- Basin size: 598 km^{2} (231 sq mi)

Basin features
- Progression: Danube→ Black Sea
- Tributaries
  - right: Affinger Bach, Kleine Paar

The Friedberger Ach is a river in Bavaria, Germany.

It is a right tributary of the Danube. Its source is in the village Untermühlhausen, northeast of Landsberg am Lech. For most of its length it flows parallel to the river Lech at only a few km distance. Towns along the Friedberger Ach include Weil, Prittriching, Mering, Friedberg, Rehling, Thierhaupten and Rain. After Rain, the Friedberger Ach flows east, parallel to the Danube, and joins the Danube near Oberhausen.

== See also ==
- List of rivers of Bavaria
