= Paul Ondrusch =

German sculptor

- Born: 4 June 1875; Leobschütz, Germany
- Died: 29 September 1952 (aged 77); Untermühlhausen, Germany
- Education: Academy of Fine Arts, Munich
- Known for: Sculpture

Paul Ondrusch (born 4 June 1875, Leobschütz; died 29 September 1952, Untermühlhausen) was a German sculptor who created religious works of art. Ondrusch was an active artist in Silesian towns and villages at the time when they belonged to the German Empire and later when they were part of Weimar Republic and the Third Reich since 1919 and 1933 respectively. After the Second World War he moved to Germany when his hometown was included in the territory of post-war communist-ruled Poland in 1945.

== Biography ==
=== Early years ===
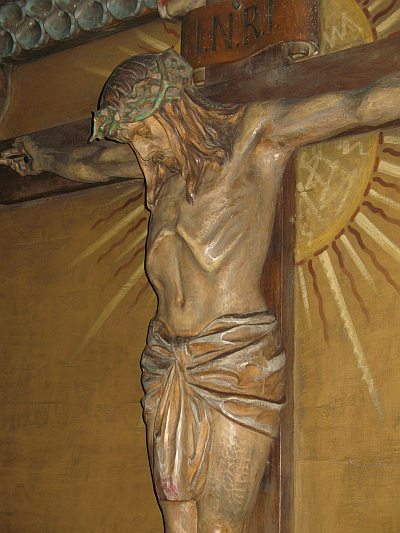
Ondrusch's wooden carving of the crucified Christ, parish church in Głubczyce, formerly his home town of Leobschütz

Ondrusch was born to Paul Ondrusch and Anna Granel as their third child. His father was an artist who specialized in carpentry and wished his son would go into the same profession, preparing him for it in his own workshop. Paul's talent was soon discovered when he started to carve wooden sculptures. After finishing primary school education, he was sent to a school in Würbenthal in which he was taught xylography. A year later, he was able to leave that school because of his extraordinary abilities. In 1890 he made a wooden sculpture of the Christ for the Catholic Church in Leobschütz (now Głubczyce in Poland). Apart from that sculpture, he also contributed to numerous projects as well as the creation of other works including a pulpit in the Trinity Church (nowadays the closed Church of St. Anne) and Saint Florian's altar in Leobschütz.

=== Academic studies ===
Having finished Würbenthal school, in November 1894 Ondrusch started his studies at the Academy of Fine Arts in Munich where he was recognized and awarded for his life-size statue of the biblical figure, Judas Iscariot, during the fourth year of his study. His teacher was Syrius Eberle. At the age of twenty-two, he was welcomed with open arms anywhere he went. Despite his early age, he was many a time offered the position of professor. However, he did not accept the offers. He decided to devote his artistic work to religious art. That choice was inspired by Ondrusch's deep Catholic beliefs which had been instilled in him by his devout family. Most of his works were crosses, altars, pulpits and figures of the saints with a particular emphasis on the figures of The Virgin Mary.

=== Further work ===
As an Academy graduate, he returned to his place of birth, Leobschütz, where he again started to work in Paul Ondrusch senior's workshop where he painted and carved in wood and stone. It was then that many of his works came into existence. These included sculptures for local schools (e.g., a monument for the deceased students and teachers; and an altar in the chapel of a local gymnasium) as well as for churches located in the nearest area, but also in Neisse; Königshütte; Langenbielau; and Anklam. He carved among other things, a figure of Saint Mary (sandstone, St. Anne Church); figure of Saint John (oakwood); and figures of Saint Francis, Saint Anthony and Saint Michael defeating the devil. Other works included organ balustrades, confessionals and Stations of the Cross.

Grateful for the support from Hans Georg von Oppersdorff (born 1866), who financed Ondrusch's studies, Ondrusch became the creator of several notable works, including a lifesize statue of Jesus for the Oppersdorffs family tombstone; busts of the members of that family; and a statue of Saint Dorothea which was subsequently cast in bronze. All of the mentioned works have been reported missing after the war. Nevertheless, Ondrusch's artistry can be evaluated and described on the basis of the two works of art which have remained in Oberglogau, 20 kilometres (12 mi) north of his family town, Leobschütz. One of them is a sandstone sculpture of Christ carrying the cross (1903, with a meaningful gesture of a raised hand). This work can be found on a defensive wall between a monastery and the building of a former city guard in Oberglogau (now Głogówek in Poland). The other work is a wooden figure of Saint Mary with the Infant Jesus which can be currently seen in the Regional Museum in Głogówek, but it used to be placed in a local castle's chapel.

Paul Ondrusch was also the creator of other sculpted tombstones and busts that decorated buildings' fronts. These first ones included the figure of Saint John the Baptist placed in the old cemetery in Leobschütz in 1924. Ondrusch's wooden sculpture of Remus von Woyrsch, a German Field Marshal General, decorated the main hall in the town hall of Leobschütz. General von Woyrsch was portrayed as a knight wearing a coat and a chain mail, with his hands placed on a handle of a large sword resting against the ground. That work has not withstood the destruction of the building, bombed in March 1945 and pulled down during the following years.

The mentioned busts decorating buildings' fronts were similar to cartouches placed above main buildings' doors. Those bas-reliefs, created by Ondrusch, decorated buildings constructed in the years 1922-1923 in Leobschütz and they portrayed Saint Hedwig with a church in the background; Saint Joseph with Jesus; Saint Martin with a coat with which he covers the needy; Saint Anne with Jesus; Saint Elizabeth with the roses; the Holy Family escaping from Egypt; the Franciscan saints; Saint George who kills a dragon; and the Madonna, this single sculpture being exceptionally done in limewood. The material used for these carvings was taken from earthworks carried out during the construction of a sports field. The newly done carvings were then transported to the master potter's workshop where they were fired in a kiln. Afterwards, the sculptures were coloured and then placed above the doors of the building. Some of these cartouches measured 135 centimetres (53 in) in length and 48 centimetres (19 in) in height, whereas others were round.

Ondrusch was commissioned by the municipal authorities of Gleiwitz to do a sculpture of crucified Christ and mourning witnesses, which was erected at the Lime trees Cemetery in Petersdorf (now Szobiszowice; a district of Gleiwitz). He was also asked to sculpt a monument dedicated to seventy-six children who were killed in a theatre in 1919. The latter work is one that is characterized as modest in its message. It portrays the children embraced by Jesus and is situated in front of a flat stone. Originally, it also included an inscription in German which could be translated as follows: "Come to me children," and "In memory of 76 children of Gleiwitz who died a violent death on 24 March 1919." Apart from these works, Ondrusch also created several other works for the All Saints' Church in Gleiwitz (now Polish Gliwice). Ondrusch presented his works at annual exhibitions in Gleiwitz; Hindenburg; and Oppeln.

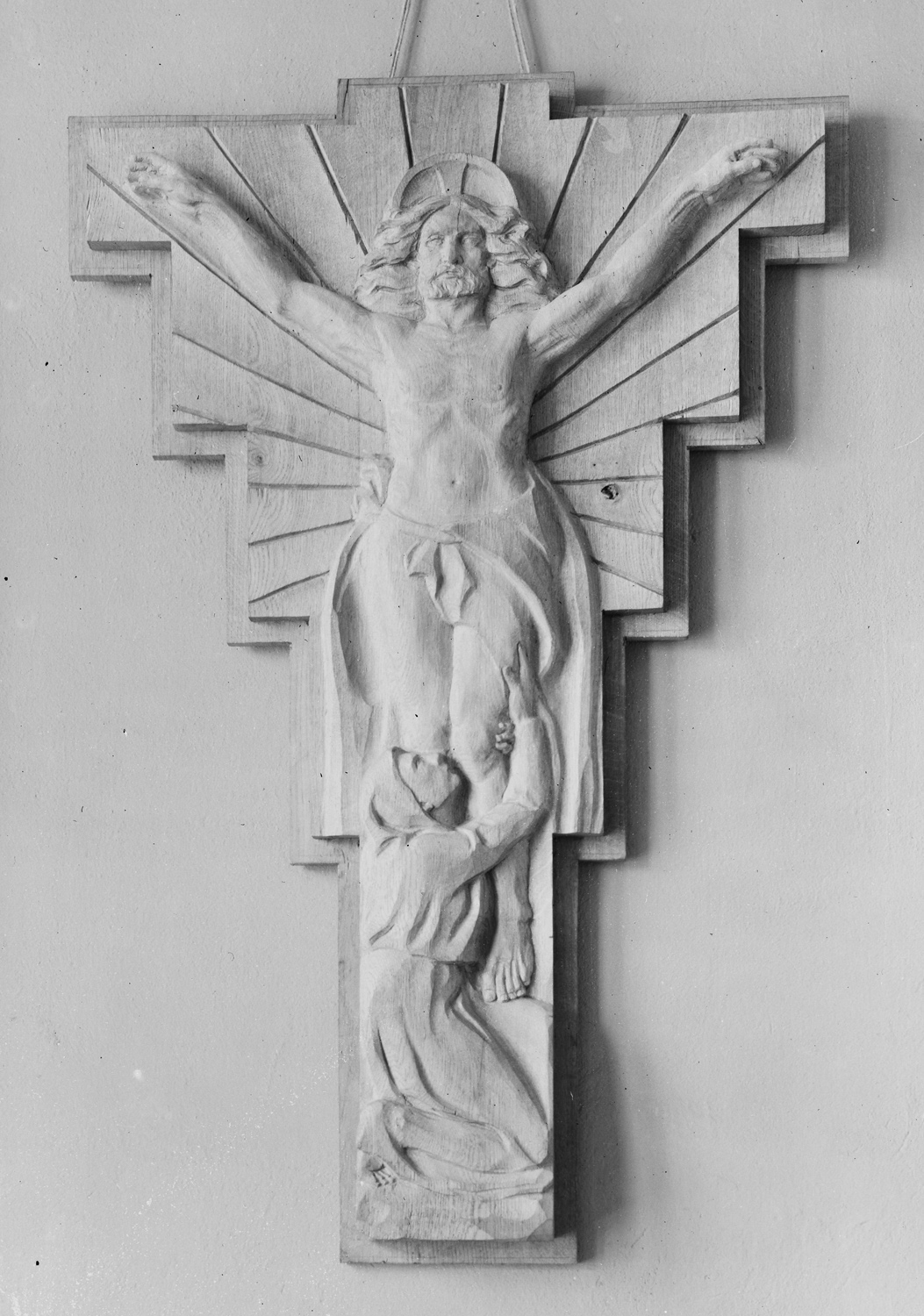
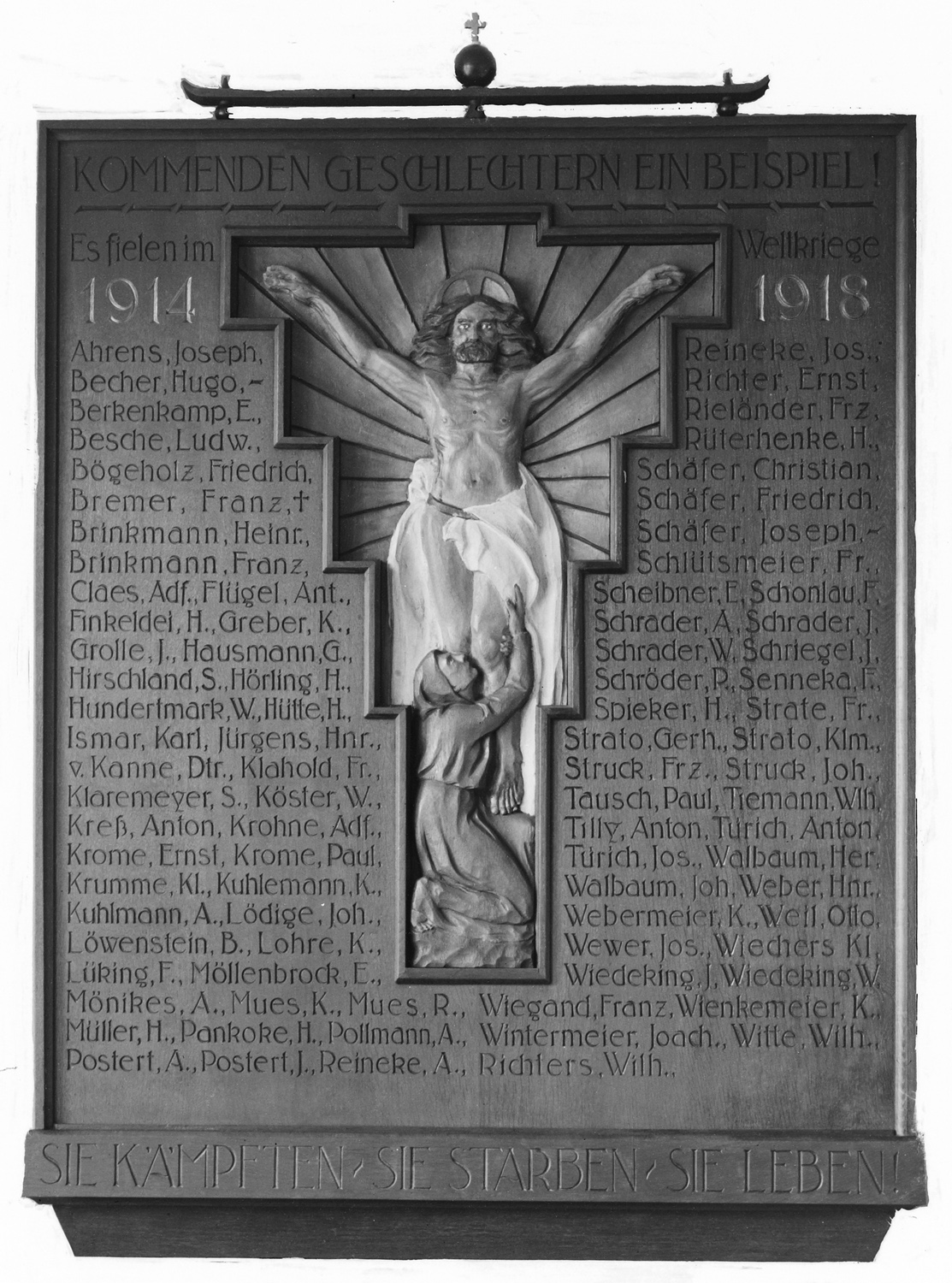
Honorary panel of the high school Steinheim, Westphalia for the students fallen in World War I., 1928
l. Ready-to-use sculptural work „The risen Christ as Lord of life and death“ as cruciform core
r. Finished Panel by Paul Ondrusch (medium sculpture) as joint work with the carpenter's shop of Anton Spilker senior (cabinetwork) and Anton Spilker junior (inscriptions).

One trace leads to Ostwestfalen. In 1927, Paul Ondrusch met his future son-in-law, Anton Spilker (fiancé of his daughter Elsa), who came from his father's cabinetmaker's workshop in Steinheim, Westphalia, and profiled himself as a furniture designer. It came to a cooperation when the workshop of Anton Spilker senior in Steinheim was commissioned to make an oak plaque for the classmates fallen in the World War by the association of former high school students. Paul Ondrusch created in his unique style the middle cross-shaped sculpture with the risen Christ as Lord of life and death. After the shipment of the core piece from Leobschütz to Steinheim, the panel was produced in its entirety in the Steinheimer carpentry, and Anton Spilker junior cut in the inscriptions and names of the fallen. It was then solemnly unveiled on 23 October 1928 and found its place in the music hall of the high school. Today, the Furniture Museum Steinheim is the repository.

Nowadays, the artist Ondrusch and the works of art preserved in Silesia are being honored again in Poland.

In the territory of the Federal Republic of Germany there are hardly any works in the generally accessible, religious or public space. So he is largely forgotten as an artist and person in Germany today.

As an exception, there are the institutions of the refugees and displaced from the Eastern territories. It is reported that works of Paul Ondrusch can be found in Oldenburg, Eschershausen (Leobschützer Heimatstube) and Wiesbaden as well as in private collections.

=== Family life ===
Ondrusch had eleven siblings. He married Martha Olbrich in 1902 and they had four daughters (Lucia born in 1902, Elsa - 1903, Margarethe - 1908 and Charlotte - 1912) and two sons (Paul born 1916 and Heinz - 1920). He was recruited during the World War I (1914–1918). His oldest daughter died in 1916 and his wife in 1922. Three years after her death, he remarried and started a second family with Emma Werdecker with whom he had a daughter Ingeborg (1928) and a son, Gerhard (1932).

Paul Ondrusch moved to Germany in 1945 and there he continued his work. He died at the age of seventy-seven.
