= Air Transport Wing 61 =

- Lufttransportgeschwader 61 (LTG 61)
- Active: 24 August 1957 - 31 December 2017
- Country: Germany
- Branch: German Air Force
- Type: Wing
- Role: Strategic and tactical transport
- Part of: Air Force Combat Command; Kommando Einsatzverbände der Luftwaffe
- Garrison/HQ: Landsberg-Lech Air Base
- Decorations: Campaign streamer Federal Republic of Germany (1997)

Commanders
- Current commander: Colonel Daniel Draken (until 31 December 2017)

Aircraft flown
- Transport: Transall C-160

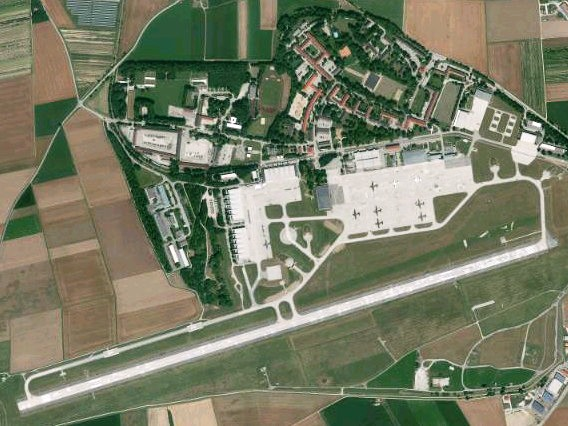
Landsberg-Lech Air Base, last home of Air Transport Wing 61

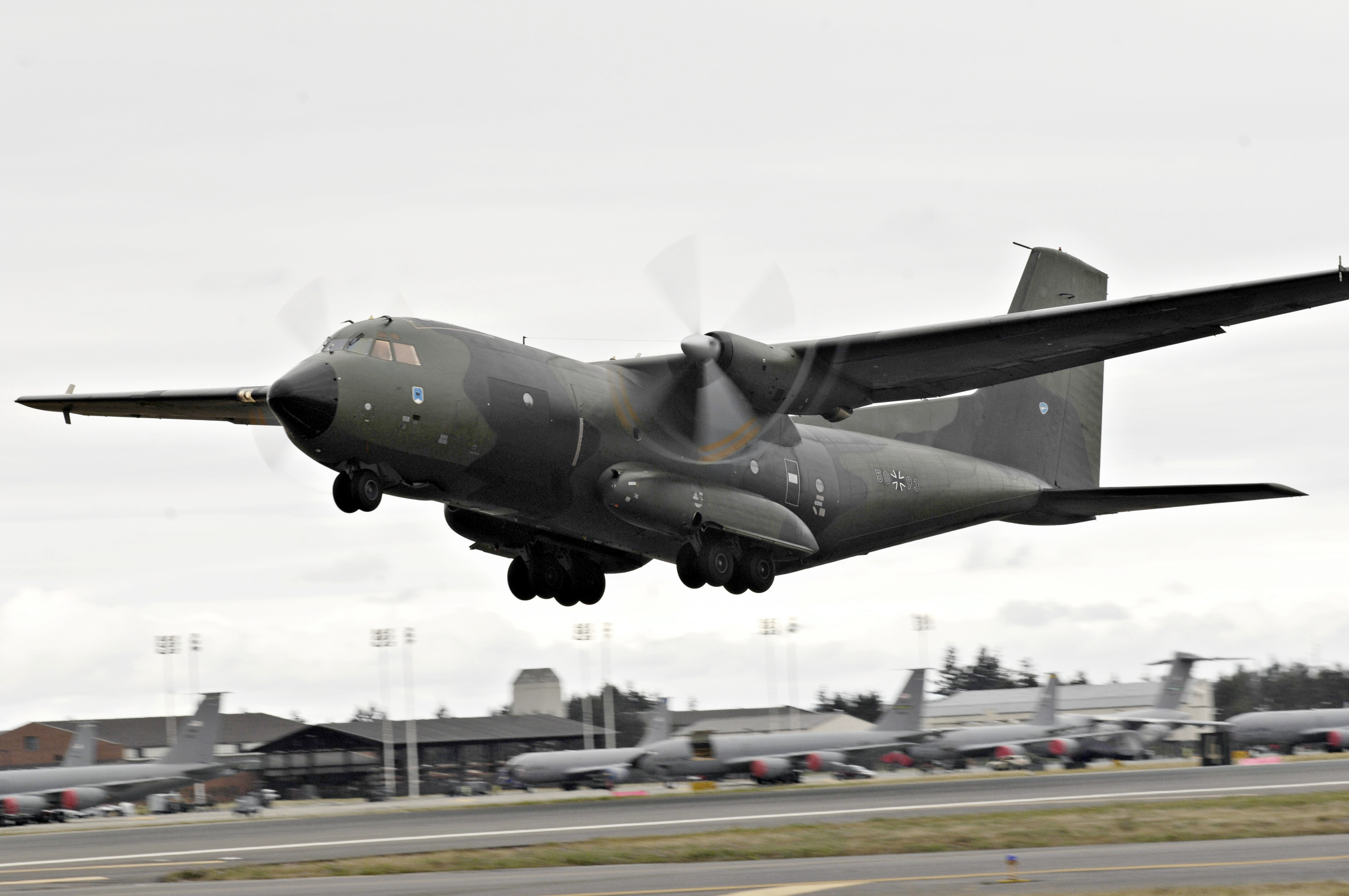
C-160 Transall of Air Transport Wing 61

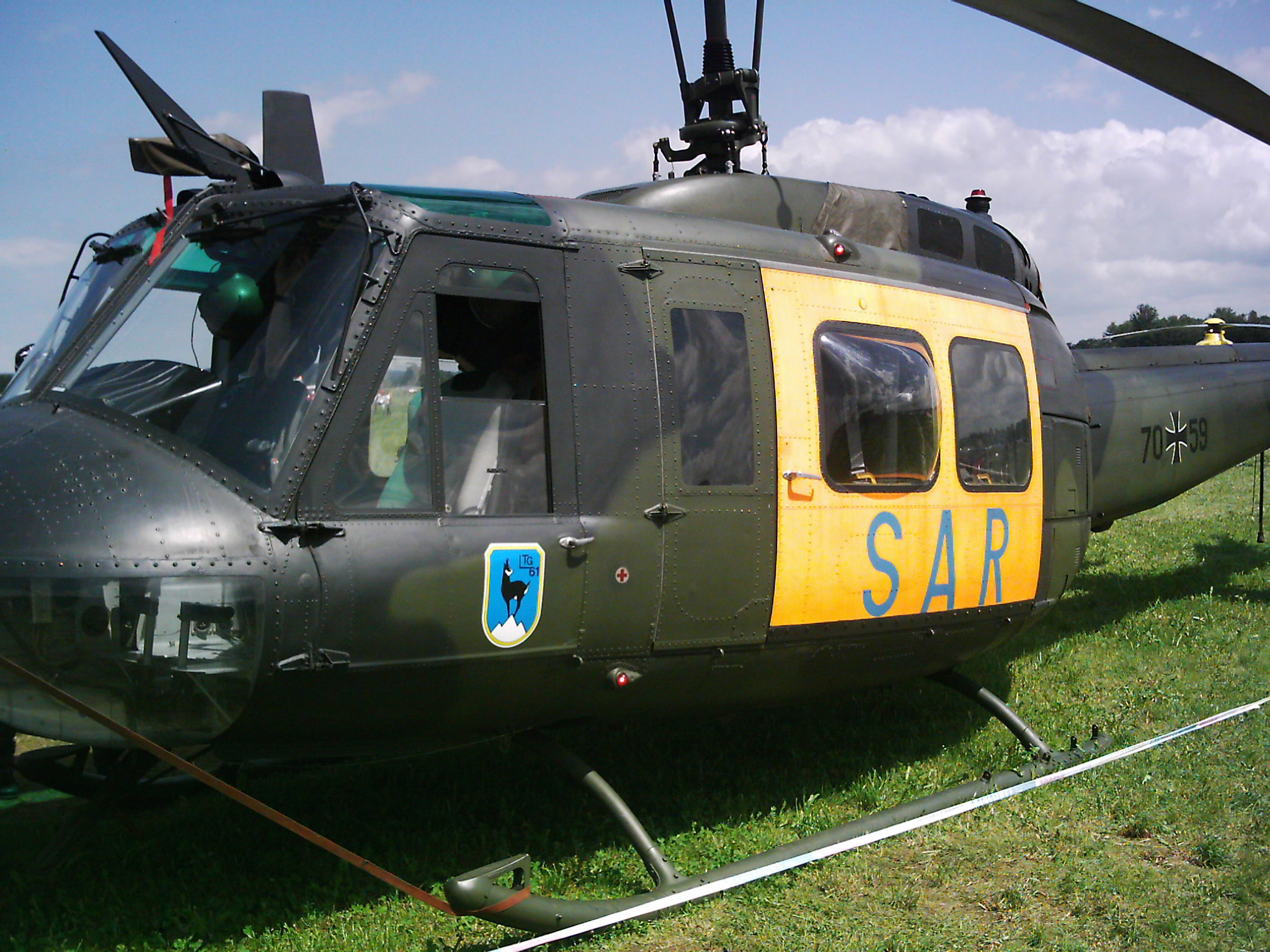
Bell UH-1D of Air Transport Wing 61

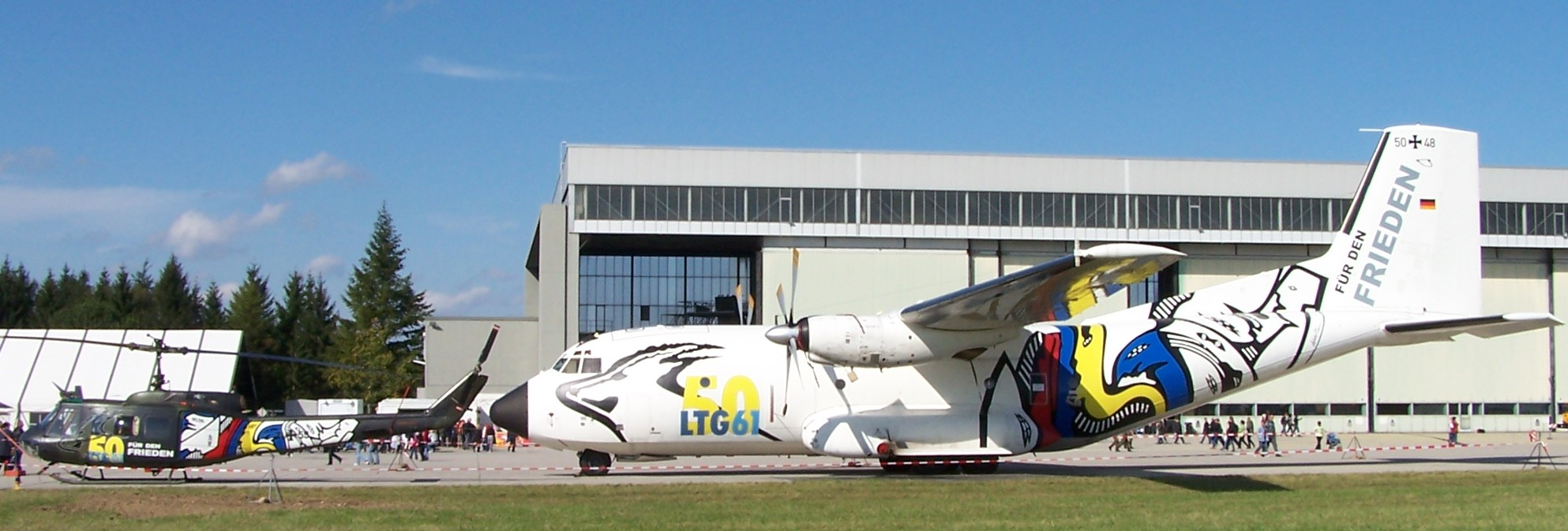
Bell UH-1D and C-160 Transall in special livery during the 50th anniversary celebrations of Air Transport Wing 61 in 2007

Farewell coat of arms of Air Transport Wing 61

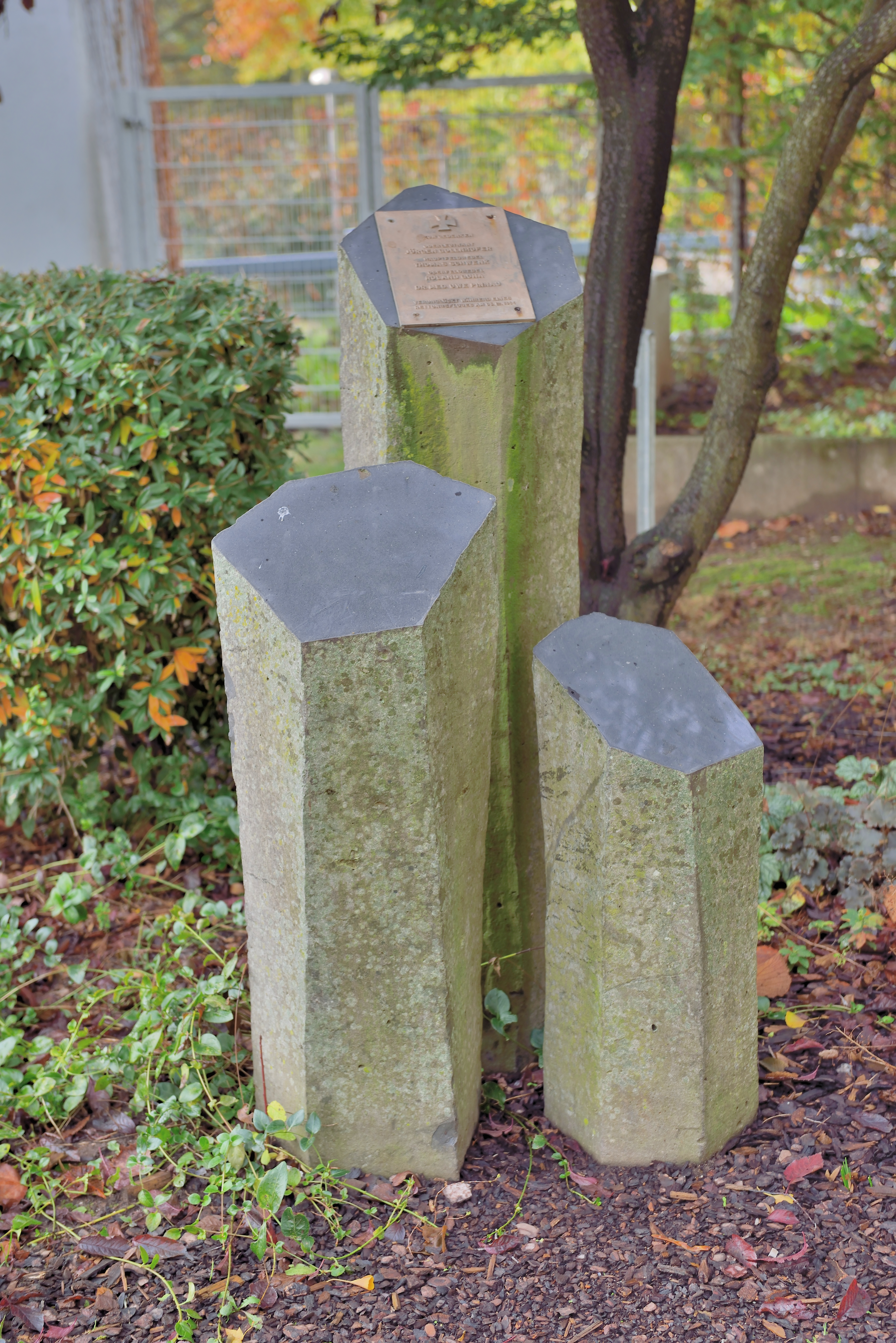
Memorial at Mannheim Communication Tower

Air Transport Wing 61 (German: Lufttransportgeschwader 61) was a wing of the German Air Force (Luftwaffe). The wing was founded in 1957 and disbanded on 31 December 2017. At that time it was based at Landsberg-Lech Air Base in Bavaria, Germany operating Transall C-160 fixed-wing aircraft, and was subordinate to Air Force Forces Command. Operational command rested, however, with European Air Transport Command. Although the wing's main task was tactical and strategic air transport, it was also employed in various humanitarian aid missions from 1960 onwards.

== Tasks ==
Air Transport Wing 61 was charged with one major task:

- Global tactical and strategic air transport of personnel and equipment

== Structure ==
At the time of its disbanding Air Transport Wing 61 consisted of two groups having had, during the course of its history, various squadrons incorporated into its structure.

- Staff
- Flying Group
- Technical Group

== Equipment ==
- C-47 Dakota
- Noratlas N 2501
- Do 28D-2 Skyservant
- Bell UH-1D
- Transall C-160

== History ==
Air Transport Wing 61 was established on 24 August 1957 by order of the then Federal Minister of Defence Franz-Josef Strauss. It consisted of two squadrons and was first based on Erding Air Base, sharing the base with the United States Air Force. Initially the wing flew C-47 Dakota aircraft. Later in 1957 Nord Noratlas aircraft were introduced, eventually replacing all DC-3. In 1958, the wing relocated to Neubiberg Air Base, Munich.

In March 1960, Air Transport Wing 61 flew its first mission when it was employed together with Air Transport Wing 62 to fly supplies to Morocco in the wake of the Agadir earthquake during the first foreign mission of the newly founded German Armed Forces. In August 1966 relief flights were carried out following the Varto earthquake in Eastern Turkey as well as to Lisbon, Portugal after the flash floods of 1967.

The wing converted to Transall C-160 in 1970 and 1971, and relocated to Landsberg-Lech Air Base. Helicopter Transport Wing 64, previously occupant of the air base, moved to Ahlhorn Air Base. Air Transport Wing 61's second squadron was disbanded in 1978. Consequently, all transport activities were combined in one Transall squadron. In 1979 one squadrons of Helicopter Transport Wing 64, flying Bell UH-1D, were incorporated into Air Transport Wing 61, forming No. 2 and No. 3 Squadron. No. 3 Squadron later relocated to Nörvenich Air Base in order to carry out SAR tasks and disbanded in 2006. From 1971 until 2003 a helicopter was stationed at Military Hospital Ulm tasked with SAR duties not only for military personnel but also providing air medical services for civilians. This helicopter first belonged to Helicopter Transport Wing 64 but was transferred to Air Transport Wing 61 in 1978.

In 1976, Air Transport Wing 61 took part in two relief operations following natural disasters. In May it provided emergency aid after Friuli earthquake in Italy, and in November it flew relief missions to Turkey after the Çaldıran–Muradiye earthquake. In 1980, it provided aid following earthquakes in Italy, the Irpinia earthquake affecting the regions of Campania and Basilicata, and to northern Algeria after the El Asnam earthquake. During the 1983–1985 famine in Ethiopia, the wing was employed to carry out numerous relief fights and was also an important component of the airbridge during the siege of Sarajevo between 1992 and 1996.

In 2007, the wing celebrated its 50th anniversary. For the occasion, two aircraft were painted in special livery. At the end of 2013 Air Transport Wing consisted only of No. 1 Squadron as No. 3 Squadron and No. 2 Squadron, flying helicopters, had been disbanded and transferred to a newly established task force led by the German Army Aviation Corps. Subsequently, all helicopters were relocated from Landsberg-Lech Air Base to Niederstetten Air Base and were incorporated into Transport Helicopter Regiment 30.

In support of the French military operation in Mali, Operation Serval, part of the Northern Mali conflict, aircraft of Air Transport Wing 61 were deployed to West Africa. In recognition of this a Transall aircraft of the wing was invited to take part in the celebration of Bastille Day of that year. In 2015, two aircraft of Air Transport Wing 61 took part in Exercise Trident Juncture 2015, one of the largest NATO-led military exercise since the end of the Cold War. The aircraft were stationed at Beja Airbase in Portugal where, incidentally, in the early 1970s crews from Landsberg-Lech Air Base were re-trained to fly C-160 Transall aircraft.

The German Air Force intends to replace the C-160 Transall with the Airbus A400M Atlas, a considerably larger aircraft. Since an extension of Landsberg-Lech Air Base is restricted by the river Lech to the west, and the municipality of Penzing to the east, the air base represented no practical option for basing the larger aircraft there. Consequently, it was decided to concentrate all A400M at Wunstorf Air Base and disbanding Air Transport Wing 61 altogether. The fly-out occurred at the end of September 2017. The final roll call took place on 14 December 2017 under the eyes of Major General Günter Katz. Air Transport Wing 61 disbanded on 31 December 2017. All remaining aircraft were handed over to Air Transport Wing 63, based at Hohn Air Base.

== Accidents and incidents ==
- On 5 December 1994, a Bell UH-1D of Air Transport Wing 61 collided with the spire of the Mannheim Communication Tower. The aircraft plummeted down 200 metres (600 ft) killing all four occupants, three members of the German Air Force and an emergency physician. The wreck of the helicopter burnt out completely. The actual cause of the accident has never been established. At the bottom of the tower a memorial stone commemorating the incident was erected.
- On 22 October 1995, a C-160 Transall of Air Transport Wing 61 crashed at Ponta Delgada on the Azores. The aircraft was on its way to the United States and had landed for refuelling. During takeoff it touched a telephone pole and subsequently crashed into the sea killing all seven crew members.
