= Johannes Naumann =

German World War II fighter pilot and wing commander in German Air Force

- Naumann as an Oberleutnant
- Born: 11 October 1917; Dresden
- Died: 22 March 2010 (aged 92); Fürstenfeldbruck
- Military career
- Allegiance: Nazi Germany (to 1945); West Germany
- Branch: Luftwaffe; German Air Force
- Rank: Major (Wehrmacht); Oberst (Bundeswehr)
- Nickname: "Fokke"
- Units: JG 26, JG 6, JG 7 Flugzeugführerschule "S"
- Commands: II./JG 26, II./JG 6, III./JG 7 Helicopter Transport Wing 64
- Conflicts: See battles World War II: Western Front; Operation Donnerkeil; Operation Bodenplatte; Defense of the Reich; Schweinfurt-Regensburg mission; second Schweinfurt raid
- Awards: Knight's Cross of the Iron Cross

Johannes Naumann (11 October 1917 – 22 March 2010) was a German Luftwaffe military aviator during World War II, a fighter ace credited with 34 aerial victories claimed in roughly 350 combat missions, all of which claimed over the Western Front. Following World War II, he served in the newly established West Germany's Air Force in the Bundeswehr and commanded the Helicopter Transport Wing 64.

== Early life and career ==
Naumann was born on 11 October 1917 in Dresden, at the time in the Kingdom of Saxony within the German Empire. In 1938, Naumann joined the military service of the Luftwaffe and received flight training. (Note: Flight training in the Luftwaffe progressed through the levels A1, A2 and B1, B2, referred to as A/B flight training. A training included theoretical and practical training in aerobatics, navigation, long-distance flights and dead-stick landings. The B courses included high-altitude flights, instrument flights, night landings and training to handle the aircraft in difficult situations.) On 1 May 1939 in Düsseldorf, Jagdgeschwader 26 "Schlageter" (JG 26—26th Fighter Wing) was created by renaming Jagdgeschwader 132 (JG 132—132nd Fighter Wing) and was commanded by Oberst Eduard Ritter von Schleich, a flying ace of World War I. Naumann was among the first pilots assigned to this unit following his training as a fighter pilot.

== World War II ==
World War II in Europe began on Friday 1 September 1939 when German forces invaded Poland. On 12 August 1940 during the Battle of Britain, Naumann claimed his first aerial victory, the claim was later not confirmed. He had engaged in aerial combat with a Royal Air Force (RAF) Supermarine Spitfire fighter near Folkestone, his opponent belonging to the No. 64 Squadron. On 3 September, the Luftwaffe targeted RAF Fighter Command airbases. JG 26 escorted bombers from Kampfgeschwader 2 (KG 2—2nd Bomber Wing) to the North Weald Airfield. That day, Naumann was credited with his first aerial victory, claiming a Spitfire fighter shot down over the Thames Estuary.

Naumann claimed his fifth and sixth confirmed aerial victory during Operation Donnerkeil. The objective of this operation was to give the German battleships Scharnhorst and Gneisenau and the heavy cruiser Prinz Eugen fighter protection in the breakout from Brest to Germany. The Channel Dash operation (11–13 February 1942) by the Kriegsmarine was codenamed Operation Cerberus by the Germans. In support of this, the Luftwaffe, formulated an air superiority plan dubbed Operation Donnerkeil for the protection of the three German capital ships. Noumann was credited with two Fairey Swordfish biplane torpedo bombers from 825 Naval Air Squadron shot down at 13:45 and 13:47 on 12 February north of Gravelines.

=== Defense of the Reich ===
The United States Army Air Forces (USAAF) VIII Bomber Command, later renamed to Eighth Air Force, had begun its regular combat operations on 17 August 1942. On 6 September, VIII Bomber Command targeted the airfield at Wizernes and Abbeville Airfield, escorted by RAF Spitfire fighters. At 18:54, Naumann claimed a No. 402 Squadron Spitfire shot down north of Hallencourt. On 20 September, Naumann was transferred from 4. Staffel to 6. Staffel where he was appointed Staffelkapitän (squadron leader). He succeeded Oberleutnant Theo Lindemann who was transferred.

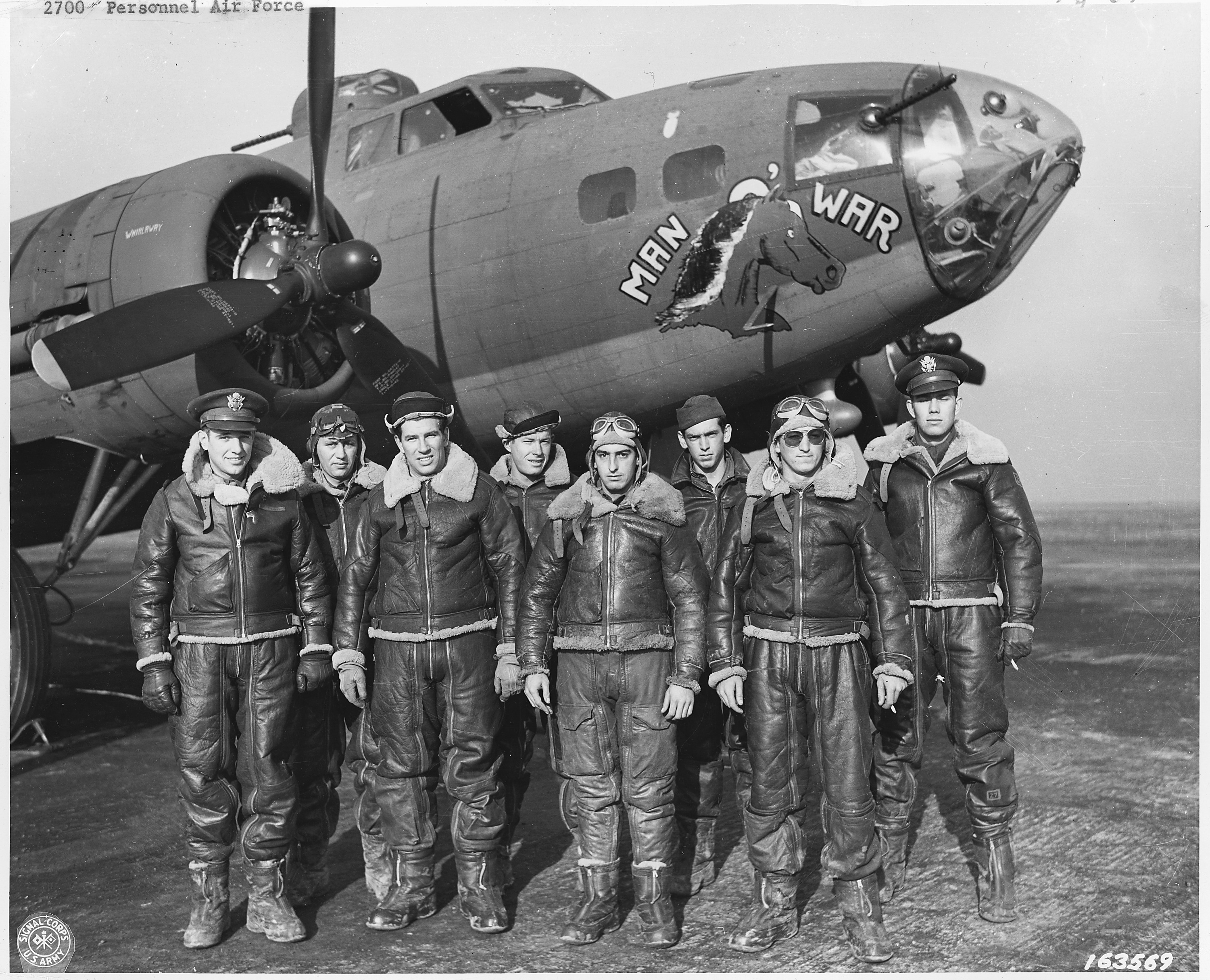
Boeing B-17F-5, shot down by Naumann on 30 July 1943.

During the Schweinfurt-Regensburg mission on 17 August 1943, Naumann shot down an escorting Republic P-47 Thunderbolt fighter of the 56th Fighter Group 10 kilometers (6.2 miles) west of Liège. That day, Gruppenkommandeur Wilhelm-Ferdinand Galland was killed in action. Galland was temporarily succeeded by Naumann until Oberstleutnant Johannes Seifert took command on II. Gruppe on 9 September. During this brief period, command of 6. Staffel was given to Oberleutnant Waldemar Radener. On 1 October, as part of the group expansion from three Staffeln per Gruppe to four Staffeln per Gruppe, Naumann's 6. Staffel was renamed to 7. Staffel. On 9 February 1944, Naumann again temporarily took command of II. Gruppe. Its former commander, Major Wilhelm Gäth had been wounded in combat on 14 January and was grounded. Naumann was officially appointed Gruppenkommandeur of II. Gruppe on 2 March. On 14 October, during the second Schweinfurt raid also called "Black Thursday", Naumann claimed his fifth heavy bomber, a B-17 bomber shot down near Domburg.

On 23 June 1944, Naumann was shot down by anti-aircraft artillery during the pursuit of a Spitfire fighter. He managed to bail out injured while his Focke-Wulf Fw 190 A-8 (Werknummer 730425—factory number) crashed south-southwest of Caen. Subsequently, command of II. Gruppe was given the Hauptmann Emil Lang. On 1 September following his convalescence, Naumann was given command of II. Gruppe of Jagdgeschwader 6 (JG 6—6th Fighter Wing). He replaced Hauptmann Willi Elstermann who had been transferred. Naumann was awarded the Knight's Cross of the Iron Cross (Ritterkreuz des Eisernen Kreuzes) on 9 November. On 17 December, the bulk of the Gruppe relocated to Quakenbrück while Naumann took his Gruppenstab (headquarters unit) to Vechta for participation in the Ardennes Offensive.

=== Operation Bodenplatte and end of war ===
On 1 January 1945, Naumann participated and led II. Gruppe of JG 6 in Operation Bodenplatte, the failed attempt to cripple Allied air forces in the Low Countries. The objective of Bodenplatte was to gain air superiority during the stagnant stage of the Battle of the Bulge and dates back to meeting held on 16 September 1944. That day, Hitler informed General der Flieger (Lieutenant General) Werner Kreipe, acting Chief of the General Staff of the Luftwaffe, about the planned offensive. The target of JG 6 was Volkel airfield. I. and III. Gruppe of JG 6 were to attack while II. Gruppe under command of Naumann was to provide cover against Allied fighters. While on course, JG 6 approached the airfield of Heesch and some of its pilots assumed it to be the Volkel airfield. While elements of JG 6 were ordered to engage, the main body continued to search for Volkel. The Geschwaderstab and II. Gruppe of JG 6 stumbled on another airfield at Helmond, which contained no aircraft. Several German pilots believed it to be Volkel and attacked, losing several of their number to ground fire. II. Gruppe of JG 6 suffered severely in the attack. Very little damage was done at Heesch or Helmond. Naumann was promoted to Major (major) on 1 March.

On 5 April, Naumann was appointed Gruppenkommandeur of III. Gruppe of Jagdgeschwader 7 "Nowotny" (JG 7—7th Fighter Wing), taking command from Hauptmann Rudolf Sinner who had been wounded in combat the day before. JG 7 "Nowotny" was the first operational jet fighter wing in the world and was named after Walter Nowotny, who was killed in action on 8 November 1944. Nowotny, a fighter pilot credited with 258 aerial victories and recipient of the Knight's Cross of the Iron Cross with Oak Leaves, Swords and Diamonds (Ritterkreuz des Eisernen Kreuzes mit Eichenlaub, Schwertern und Brillanten), had been assessing the Messerschmitt Me 262 under operational conditions. The unit surrendered on 8 May 1945.

== Later life and service ==
From 1 April 1963 to 15 July 1966, Naumann served as an advisor (Hilfsreferent) with the German Air Staff (Führungsstab der Luftwaffe—Fü L III 2 Internationale Zusammenarbeit Luftwaffe) for international collaboration. Since April 1959, the Bundesluftwaffe formed three Staffeln for rescue and utility transport and liaison purposes. These units were based at Faßberg Air Base, Lechfeld Air Base and Fürstenfeldbruck Air Base, flying the Bell H-13 Sioux, Bristol Type 171 Sycamore, Aérospatiale Alouette II, Sikorsky S-58, and Vertol H-21 helicopters, as well as the Dornier Do 27 aircraft for liaison duties. On 1 October 1966, these units were consolidated and reformed as Helicopter Transport Wing 64 at Landsberg-Lech Air Base, formerly known as Penzing Air Base, and placed under the command of Oberst Naumann.

Naumann credited his father with inspiring him to become a fighter pilot. In May 2008, interviewer James Holland asked Naumann why he wanted to fly fighters, to which he responded, "The most important reason was that my father was a pilot in the 1st World War. My father told me a lot of his experiences, so it was not a difficult decision for me." Naumann went on to fly both the Me 109 and the Fw 190 in combat during World War II, and while he also trained on the Me 262, he never flew the jet operationally. Naumann died on 22 March 2010 at the age of 92 in Fürstenfeldbruck, Germany.

== Summary of career ==
=== Aerial victory claims ===
According to Obermaier, Naumann was credited with 34 aerial victories all which claimed in approximately 350 combat missions over the Western Front, including seven heavy bombers. Mathews and Foreman, authors of Luftwaffe Aces — Biographies and Victory Claims, researched the German Federal Archives and found records for 34 aerial victories, plus one further unconfirmed claim. All of his aerial victories were claimed over the Western Allies and includes seven four-engined bombers.

Chronicle of aerial victories
This and the – (dash) indicates unwitnessed aerial victory claims for which Naumann did not receive credit. This along with the * (asterisk) indicates an Herausschuss (separation shot)—a severely damaged heavy bomber forced to separate from his combat box which was counted as an aerial victory. This and the ? (question mark) indicates information discrepancies listed by Caldwell, Prien, Stemmer, Rodeike, Bock, Mathews and Foreman.
Claim	Date	Time	Type	Location	Claim	Date	Time	Type	Location
– 9. Staffel of Jagdgeschwader 26 "Schlageter" – Action at the Channel and over England — 26–21 June 1941
—	12 August 1940	18:20	Spitfire	Folkestone	2	21 June 1941	16:35	Hurricane	west of Boulogne
1	3 September 1940	11:10	Spitfire	Thames Estuary; 10 km (6.2 mi) southeast of Southend					
– 9. Staffel of Jagdgeschwader 26 "Schlageter" – On the Western Front — 22 June – 31 December 1941
3	3 July 1941	11:45	Spitfire		4	21 August 1941	15:10	Spitfire	
– 9. Staffel of Jagdgeschwader 26 "Schlageter" – On the Western Front — 1 January – 21 September 1942
5	12 February 1942	13:45	Swordfish	north of Gravelines	7	27 April 1942	12:30	Spitfire	4 km (2.5 mi) north of Calais
6	12 February 1942	13:47	Swordfish	north of Gravelines	8	23 May 1942	11:52	Spitfire	north of Calais
– 4. Staffel of Jagdgeschwader 26 "Schlageter" – On the Western Front — 28 February – 21 September 1942
9	6 September 1942	18:54	Spitfire	north of Hallencourt					
– 6. Staffel of Jagdgeschwader 26 "Schlageter" – On the Western Front — 1 January – 30 September 1943
10	13 February 1943	12:24	Spitfire	northeast of Rue	18	26 July 1943	11:16	Boston	Vendeville airfield
11	16 February 1943	17:28	Spitfire	Bourseville, east-northeast of Le Tréport	19	30 July 1943	10:25	B-17	5 km (3.1 mi) southeast of Est
12	8 March 1943	14:08? (Note: According to Mathews and Foreman claimed at 14:10.)	B-24	15 km (9.3 mi) southeast of Hastings	20	12 August 1943	09:05? (Note: According to Caldwell claimed at 09:00.)	B-17*	coal mine Hagen vicinity of Hagen
13	4 April 1943	14:41? (Note: According to Caldwell claimed at 14:42.)	Spitfire	10 km (6.2 mi) southwest of Dieppe	21	17 August 1943	17:00	P-47	10 km (6.2 mi) west of Liège
14	3 May 1943	18:15	Spitfire	west of Zandvoort	22	19 August 1943	18:32	Spitfire	5 km (3.1 mi) northwest of Le Tréport
15	13 May 1943	16:35	Spitfire	10–20 km (6.2–12.4 mi) northwest of Albert; 10 km (6.2 mi) northwest of Doullens	23	2 September 1943	20:21	P-47	8 km (5.0 mi) northwest of Lens vicinity of Merville
16	14 May 1943	12:40	B-17	4 km (2.5 mi) north of Menen; Dadizele	24	11 September 1943	18:45? (Note: According to Mathews and Foreman claimed at 18:42.)	Typhoon	Forges-les-Eaux
17	22 June 1943	09:16? (Note: According to Caldwell claimed at 09:15. According to Mathews and Foreman claimed at 09:20 as an Herausschuss over a four-engined bomber.)	B-17	west of Antwerp	25	21 September 1943	10:40	B-25	between Arras and Saint-Pol
– 7. Staffel of Jagdgeschwader 26 "Schlageter" – On the Western Front — 1 October 1943 – 9 February 1944
26	14 October 1943	13:35? (Note: According to Caldwell claimed at 13:30.)	B-17	Domburg vicinity of Maastricht	28	21 December 1943	11:51	Spitfire	Douai
27	11 November 1943	14:55	B-17	north-northwest of Breda					
– II. Gruppe of Jagdgeschwader 6 "Horst Wessel" – On the Western Front and in defense of the Reich — 1 September 1944 – 30 March 1945
29	8 September 1944	17:05	Auster	west of Huy	31	12 September 1944	16:11	P-38	south-southeast of Düren; Düren-Zülpich
30	12 September 1944	16:09	P-38	south-southeast of Düren	32	14 October 1944	10:50	P-38	east of Cologne

=== Awards ===
- Iron Cross (1939) 2nd and 1st Class
- Honor Goblet of the Luftwaffe on 25 June 1943 as Oberleutnant and pilot
- German Cross in Gold on 31 August 1943 as Hauptmann in the 6./Jagdgeschwader 26
- Knight's Cross of the Iron Cross on 9 November 1944 as Hauptmann and Gruppenkommandeur of the II./Jagdgeschwader 6

== Notes ==
Military offices
Preceded by none	Commander of Helicopter Transport Wing 64; 1 October 1966 – 30 September 1973	Succeeded by Oberst Rudolf Meyer
