= Kleine Paar =

River in Germany

Location
- Country: Germany
- State: Bavaria

Physical characteristics
- Mouth
  - location: Friedberger Ach
  - coordinates: 48.7345°N 11.0600°E
- Length: 30.8 km (19.1 mi)
- Basin size: 175 km^{2} (68 sq mi)

Basin features
- Progression: Friedberger Ach→ Danube→ Black Sea

Kleine Paar is a river of Bavaria, Germany. It flows into the Friedberger Ach near Stepperg.

== See also ==
- List of rivers of Bavaria
