= Affinger Bach =

River in Germany

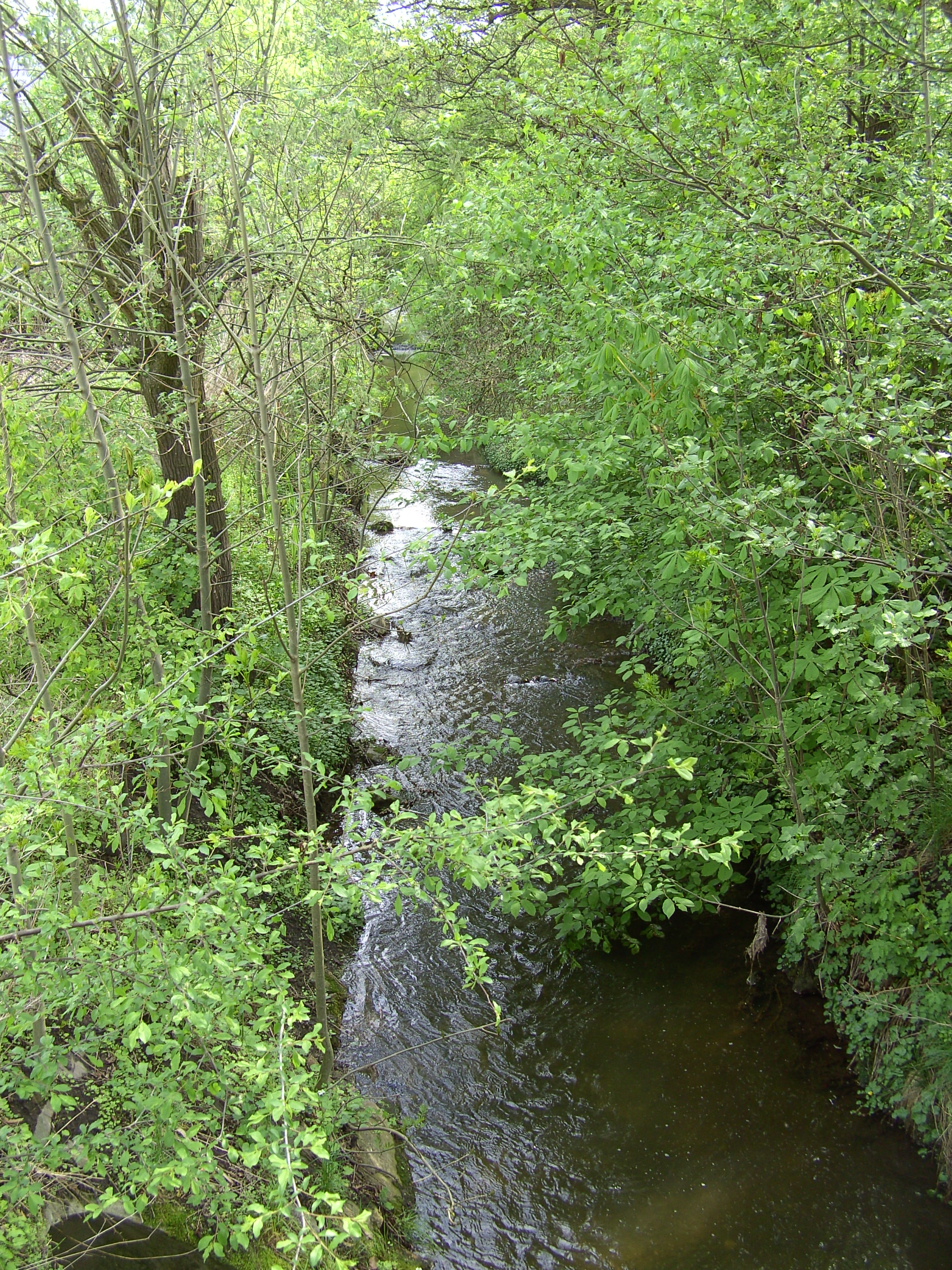
- The Affinger Bach in Affing

- Location within Germany

Location
- Country: Germany
- Location: Bavaria

Physical characteristics
- Mouth
  - location: Friedberger Ach
  - coordinates: 48.4588°N 10.9340°E
- Length: 7.1 km (4.4 mi)

Basin features
- Progression: Friedberger Ach→ Danube→ Black Sea

The Affinger Bach is a river of Bavaria, Germany. It flows into the Friedberger Ach in Anwalting (a part of Affing).

== See also ==
- List of rivers of Bavaria
