= Air Transport Wing 62 =

- Lufttransportgeschwader 62 (LTG 62)
- Active: 1959–1971; 1978–present
- Country: Germany
- Branch: German Air Force
- Type: Wing
- Role: Strategic and tactical transport
- Size: 40 aircraft (52 planned)
- Part of: Air Force Forces Command; Luftwaffentruppenkommando (LwTrKdo)
- Garrison/HQ: Wunstorf Air Base
- March: Fliegermarsch
- Decorations: Campaign streamer Lower Saxony (1985); Campaign streamer Federal Republic of Germany (1997)

Commanders
- Current commander: Colonel Markus Knoll

Insignia
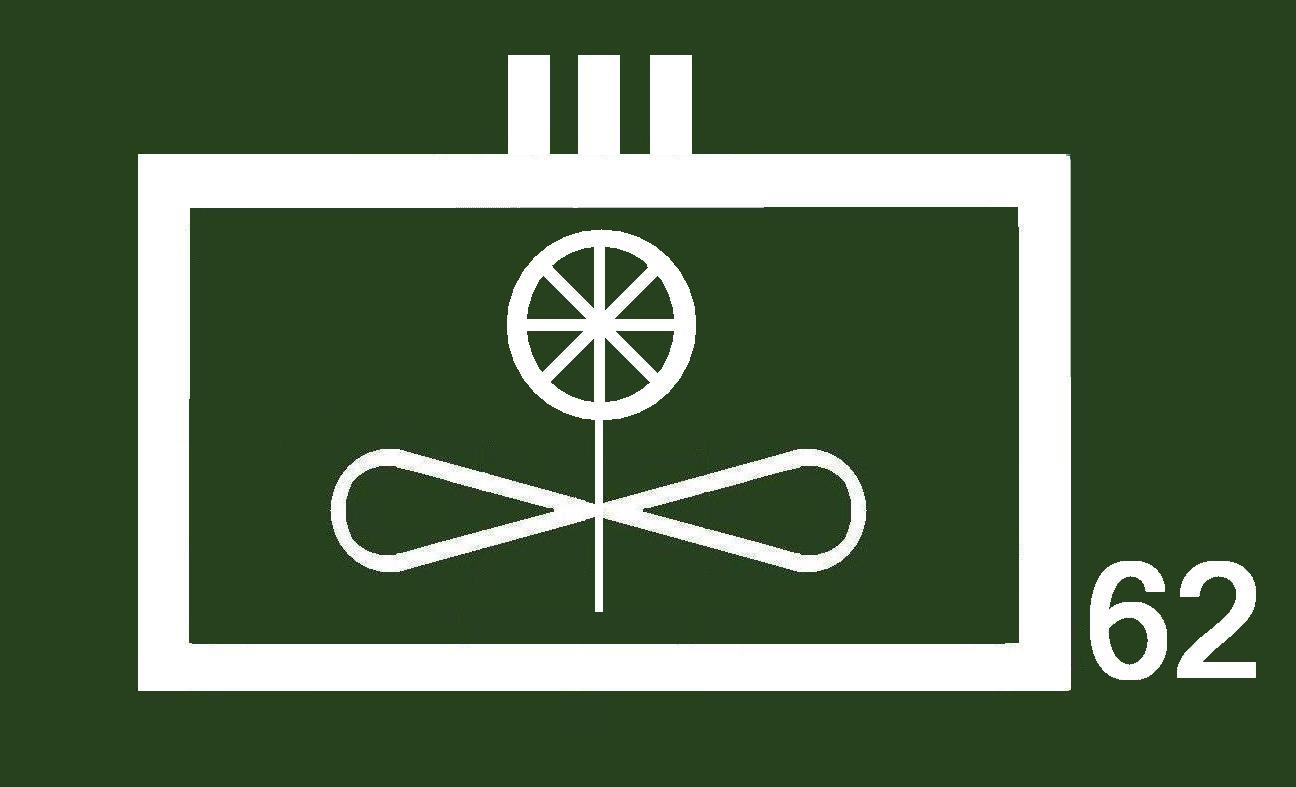
- APP-6A symbol

Aircraft flown
- Transport: Airbus A400M

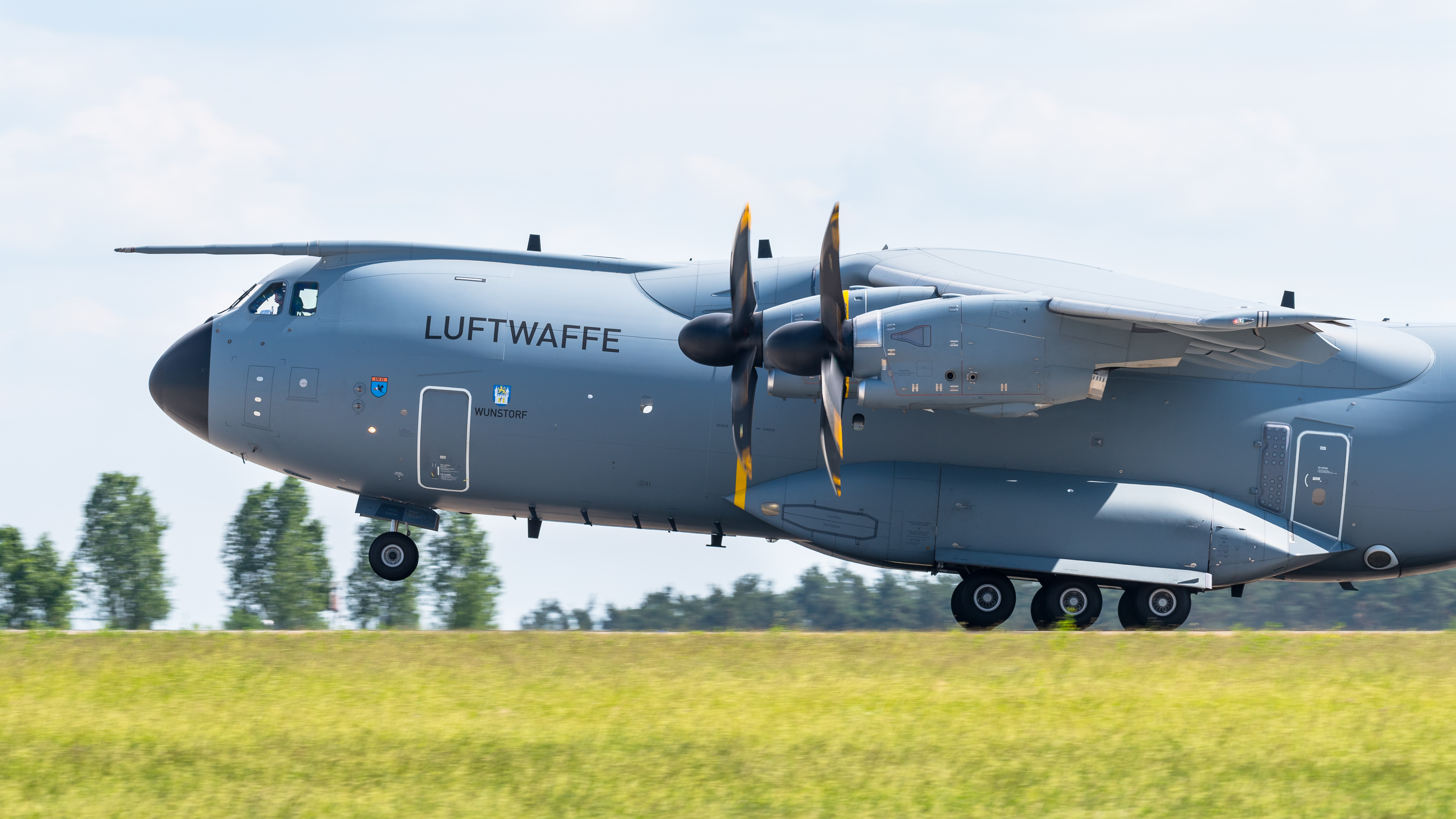
Airbus A400M of Air Transport Wing 62

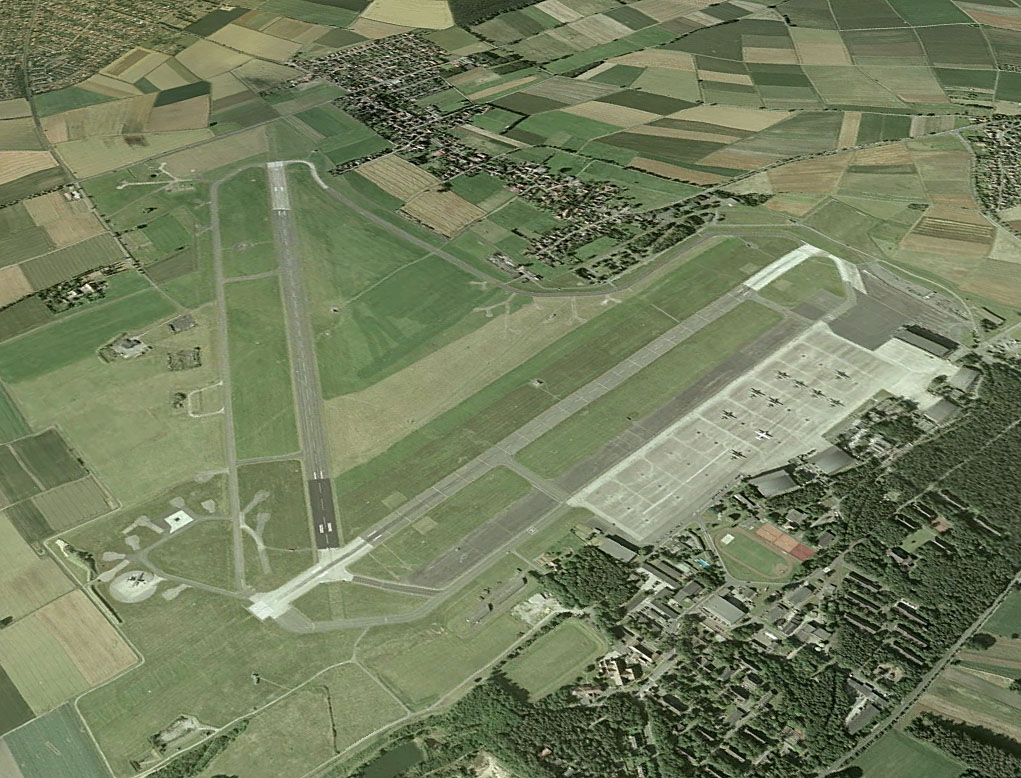
Wunstorf Air Base, home of Air Transport Wing 62

Air Transport Wing 62 (German: Lufttransportgeschwader 62) is a wing of the German Air Force (Luftwaffe). The wing was founded in 1959 and is currently based at Wunstorf Air Base in Lower-Saxony, Germany operating Airbus A400M fixed-wing aircraft. Air Transport Wing 62 is subordinate to Air Force Forces Command which in turn is subordinate to Air Force Command. Operational command rests, however, with European Air Transport Command.

Although the wing's main task is tactical air transport, it has been widely employed in various humanitarian aid missions since 1960.

== Tasks ==
The tasks of Air Transport Wing 62 are twofold:

- Global tactical air transport of personnel and equipment from Wunstorf Air Base
- Training of German and French Airbus A400M crews at Wunstorf Air Base

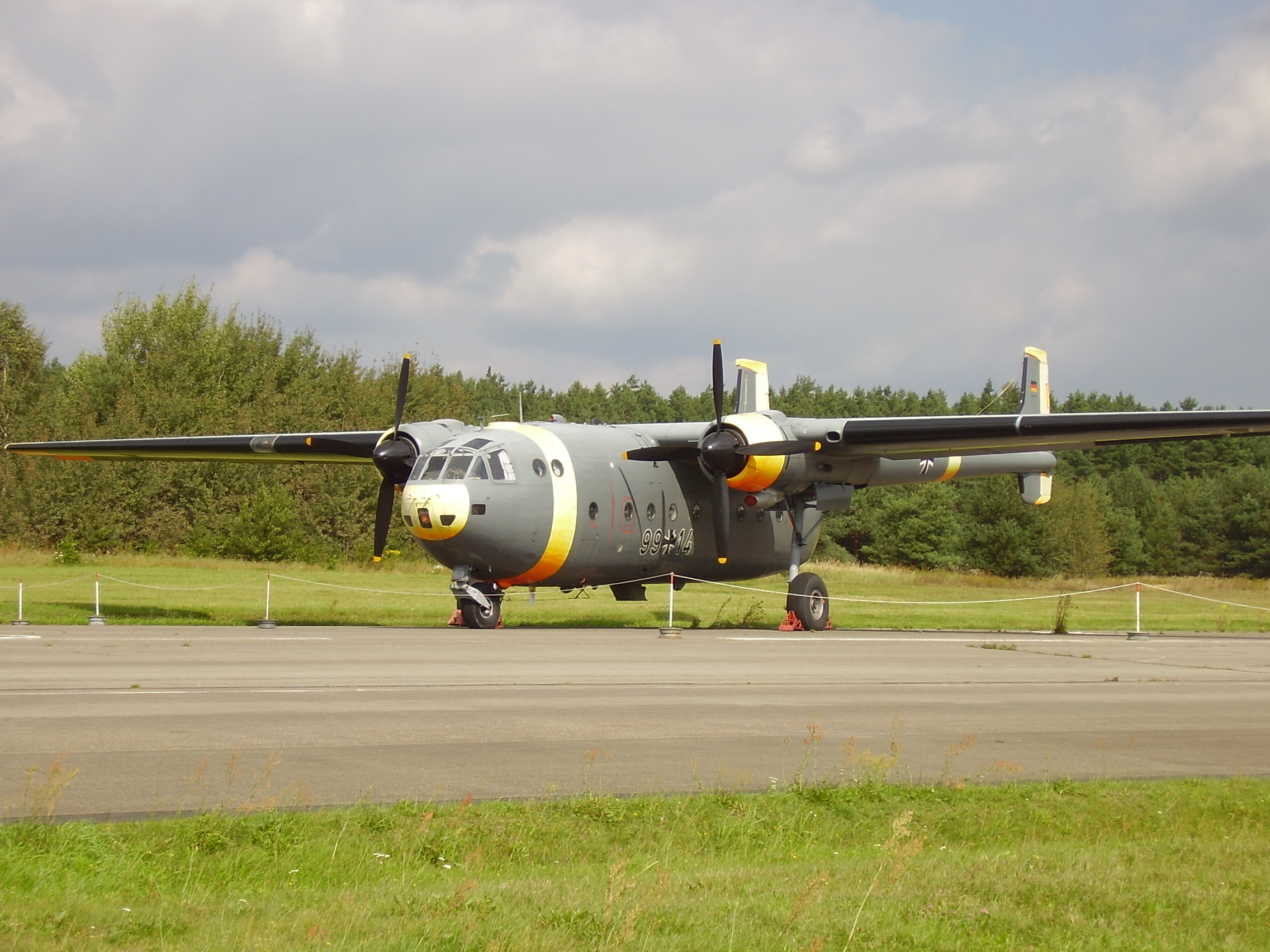
Nord Noratlas of the German Air Force

== Structure ==
Air Transport Wing 62 consist of two groups including several flying and non-flying squadrons.

- Staff
- Flying Group
  - 1. Flying Squadron (designated for logistic air transport, air-to-air-refueling and military evacuations)
  - 2. Flying Squadron (designated for tactical air transport and military evacuations)
  - 3. Flying Squadron (designated for special operations)
  - 4. Flying Squadron, based at Bremen Airport, carries out flight training in cooperation with Lufthansa Aviation Training
  - Flight Operations Squadron
- Technical Group
  - Two technical squadrons
  - Supply Transport Squadron
  - Training Workshop
- Training Inspectorate

== Equipment ==
Currently, Air Transport Wing 62 flies the following aircraft:

- Airbus A400M

Aircraft formerly flown by Air Transport Wing 62 include:

- Transall C-160
- Nord Noratlas
- Bell UH-1D

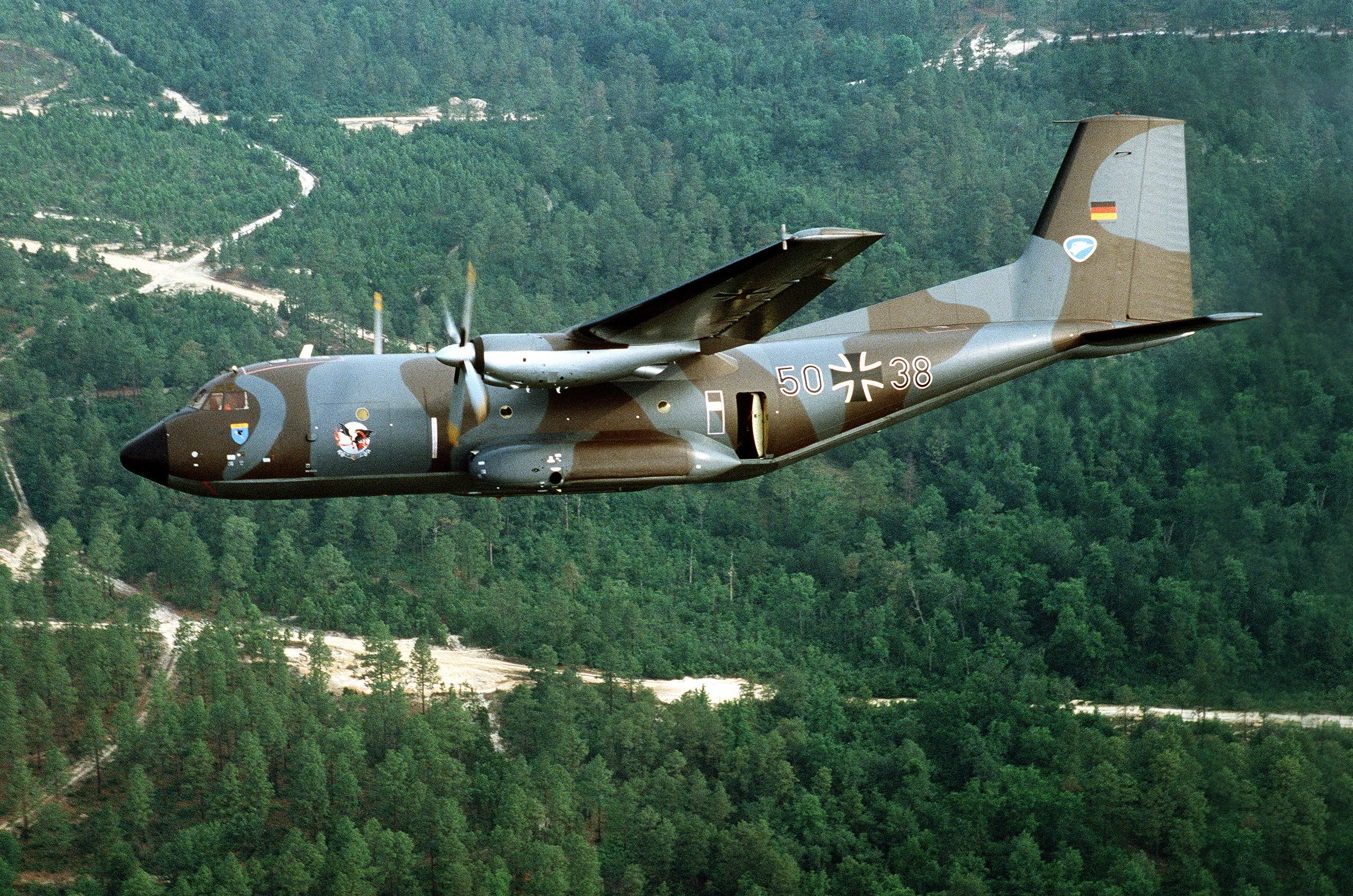
Transall C-160 of Air Transport Wing 62

== History ==
Air Transport Wing 62 was founded on 1 October 1959. Originally based at Celle Air Base, it was redeployed to Cologne-Wahn Air Base in November of that year. In January 1960, the wing began to receive Nord Noratlas aircraft, 18 of which were eventually delivered. Two months later, in March 1960, Air Transport Wing 62 flew its first mission when it was employed to fly supplies to Morocco in the wake of the Agadir earthquake during the first foreign mission of the newly founded German Armed Forces.

In March 1963, all squadrons of Air Transport Wing 62 relocated to Ahlhorn Air Base except No 3 Squadron which remained at Cologne-Wahn Air Base and became part of the Special Air Mission Wing of the German Ministry of Defence. Twelve Noratlas of Air Transport Wing 62 and Air Transport Wing 63 flew humanitarian aid missions to Algeria, following an earthquake in 1965. The first Transall C-160s were delivered in April 1968.

Air Transport Wing 62 was disbanded in September 1971 but was re-established in October 1978 when Pilot Training School "S" at Wunstorf Air Base was reclassified as Air Transport Wing 62. Following the 1983–1985 famine in Ethiopia, the wing flew 1,859 humanitarian aid missions in Ethiopia and Sudan from March until September 1985. During the Gulf War Air Transport Wing 62 assisted the coalition forces by providing logistic support. It also flew missions to provide humanitarian aid to Kurdish refugees in northern Iraq and Turkey in 1990.

From July 1992 until March 1995, Air Transport Wing 62 provided logistic support to UNPROFOR, the United Nations protection and peacekeeping force during the Yugoslav Wars, and flew supply missions into the besieged city of Sarajevo.

After the German reunification in 1990, the wings of the former East German Air Force were integrated into the German Armed Forces (Bundeswehr). To this effect new wings, now under the command of the Luftwaffe, were created. One such wing was Air Transport Wing 65 based at Brandenburg-Briest Air Base and flying Mil Mi-8 helicopters. This wing was disbanded in January 1993 and reformed as an air transport detachment. This detachment subsequently became subordinate to Air Transport Wing 62. In September 1993, Helicopter Transport Wing 64, based at Ahlhorn Air Base, was also disbanded, and 35 Bell UH-1D helicopters were integrated into Air Transport Wing 62.

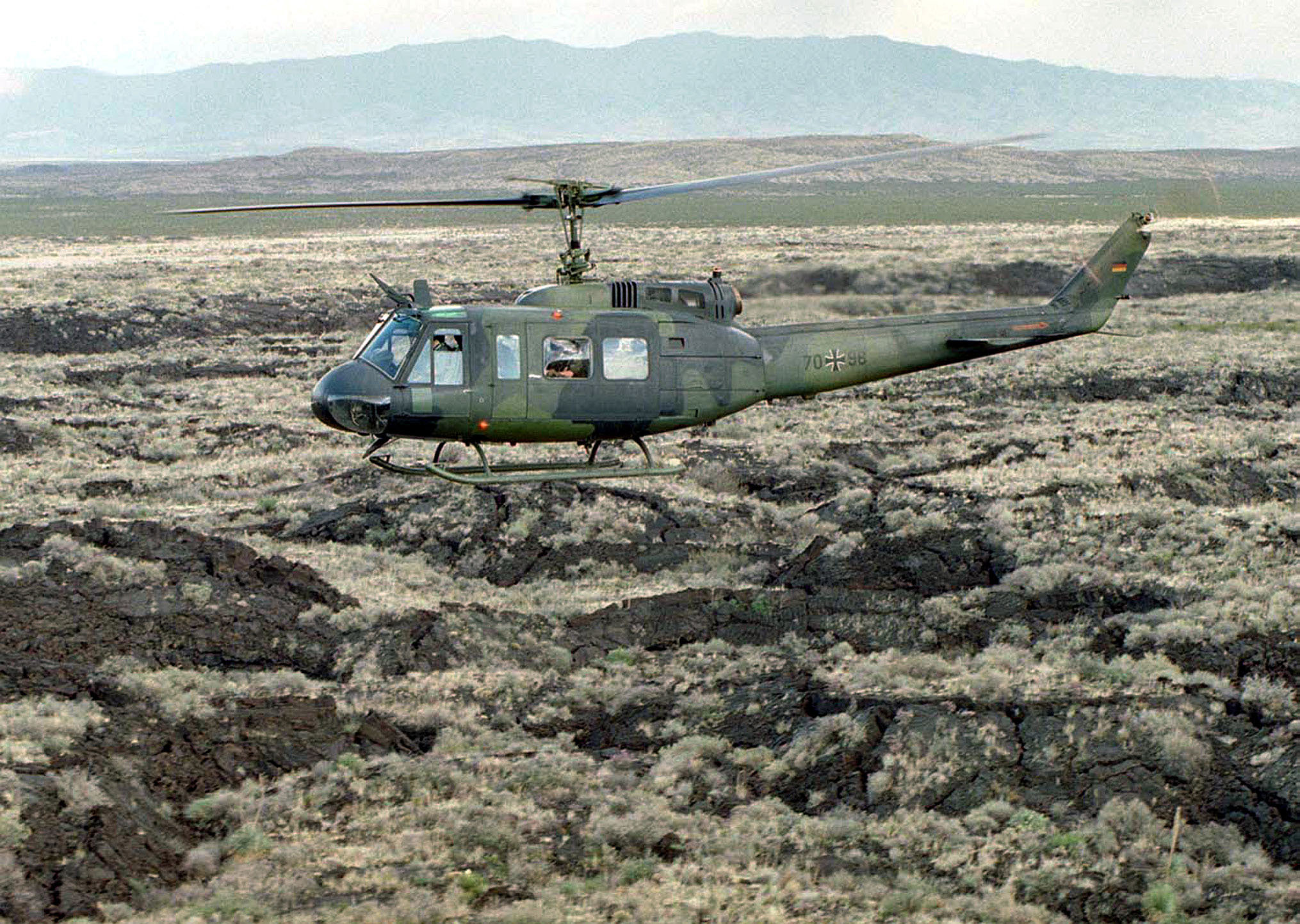
Bell UH1-D of Air Transport Wing 62

Coat of arms of the Training Inspectorate

The wing took over Holzdorf Air Base in January 1994 where a squadron of the former Helicopter Transport Wing 64 and other airforce units, formerly based at Brandenburg-Briest Air Base, were stationed. They formed Air Transport Detachment of Air Transport Wing 62. This detachment was responsible for air transport missions within the SAR commands at Holzdorf and Erfurt, as well as the emergency services centre at Neustrelitz. In the following years, these helicopters took part in several SAR missions both within Germany as well as abroad, notably during the 1997 Central European flood and the 2002 European floods.

Between 1996 and 2004, Air Transport Wing 62 was part of SFOR, the NATO-led multinational peacekeeping force deployed to Bosnia and Herzegovina after the Bosnian war and continues to support KFOR, the NATO mission to establish a secure environment in Kosovo. During the 2000 Mozambique flood, Air Transport Wing 62 was employed to fly supplies into affected areas of the country.

Since February 2002 Air Transport Wing 62 has operated from an air base at Termez in Uzbekistan, in conjunction with Air Transport Wing 61. The airbase is the main support base for German forces operating with ISAF in Afghanistan.

In 2003, the wing took part in Operation Artemis, a European Union-led military mission to the Democratic Republic of the Congo in support of MONUC, the United Nations mission to stabilise the country.

In November 2004, plans by the Federal Ministry of Defence were released to replace the wing's Transall C-130s and Bell UH-1Ds, with Airbus A400M and NHIndustries NH90. According to the original planning, the Airbus A400AM should have been brought into service within a few years. However, due to technical problems the first aircraft of the new type were expected to enter service not before November 2014. Air Transport Wing 62 will be the only wing within the German Air Force to fly the Airbus A400M.

On 1 October 2010, the helicopter detachment based at Holzdorf Air Base was disbanded and re-established as Helicopter Wing 64. Since then, Air Transport Wing 62 has only operated fixed-wing aircraft.

Over the period 22–26 February 2011 Air Transport Wing 62 took part in Operation Pegasus, evacuating foreign nationals during the Libyan Civil War, during which they were credited with rescuing 262 persons.

The first aircraft Airbus A400M entered service with Air Transport Wing 62 on 19 December 2014. The last Transall left Wunstorf in July 2015. By December 2019 Air Transport Wing operated 31 Airbus A400M.

== Accidents and incidents ==
- On 11 May 1990, while on a low-level training flight a Transall C-160 crashed near Rodenbach in the German state of Hesse due to poor visibility. All ten occupants were killed.
- Whilst approaching Sarajevo International Airport during the Bosnian War a Transall C-160 came under anti-aircraft fire on 5 February 1993, severely injuring Sergeant Wilhelm Wiegel.

== Coat of arms ==
The coat of arms used by Air Transport Wing 62 originally belonged to Pilot Training School "S" but was adopted by the wing when it took off over the school ïn 1971. It depicts a blindfolded raven in flight on a shield held in azure. The azure represents the medium of the air in which the wing operates. The raven is an adaption of the cartoon character "Hans Huckebein" by the influential German caricaturist and painter Wilhelm Busch who was born close to Wunstorf Air Base in nearby Wiedensahl, also used for the designation of Focke-Wulf's never built, 1945-era Ta 183 jet fighter concept. Choosing "Hans Huckebein" for its coat of arms, the wing manifests its attachment and commitment to Wunstorf. The blindfold symbolises the fact that Air Transport Wing 62 carries out instrument training for instrument flights on fixed-wing aircraft.
