= Landsberg-Lech Air Base =

Former German Air Force military airfield, Landsberg am Lech

Landsberg-Lech Air Base Flugplatz Landsberg Advanced Landing Ground R-54

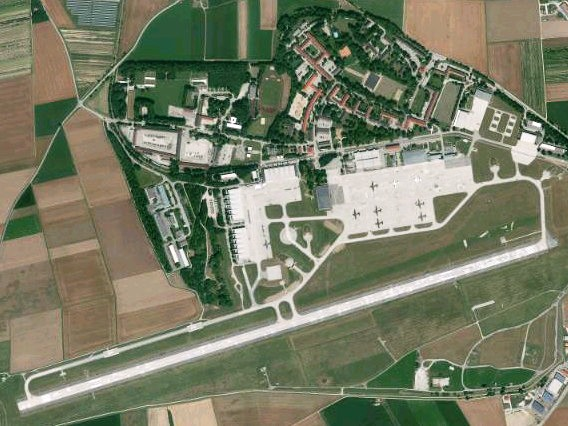
- IATA: none; ICAO: ETSA

Summary
- Airport type: Military
- Owner: Unified Armed Forces of the Federal Republic of Germany
- Operator: German Air Force
- Location: Landsberg am Lech, Germany
- Elevation AMSL: 2,044 ft / 623 m
- Coordinates: 48°4′0″N 010°54′00″E

Map
- Location of Landsberg-Lech Air Base

Runways
Direction	Length		Surface
Direction	m	ft	Surface
07/25	2,044	6,700	Asphalt

Landsberg-Lech Air Base (German: Fliegerhorst Landsberg/Lech, ICAO: ETSA) is a former German Air Force base located near the town of Landsberg am Lech in Bavaria.

Landsberg was used as a transport base. It was the home of Air Transport Wing 61. Aircraft at the base were C-160 Transall transport aircraft and UH-1D Huey helicopters.

== History ==
=== World War II ===
With the formation of the Luftwaffe in 1935, locations for air bases were selected throughout the entire country. The Penzing area was selected for one of these bases because of the suitable geographical, navigational and other technical aspects. Land was procured in 1935 and by spring of 1936 the construction of Landsberg Air Base was well underway. A small detachment of airmen arrived on 10 February 1937 and a full complement had arrived by 1 March. The Luftwaffe unit was designated Combat Wing 255.

The first assigned aircraft were Dornier Do 17E and 17M bombers. On 1 August 1939 the Do 17s were replaced by the Heinkel He 111, and the unit was designated as Kampfgeschwader 51. During World War II, this unit saw combat on all war fronts. Landsberg, meanwhile, was utilized primarily for pre-flying and general training.

Late in the war, two attacks by USAAF B-17 Flying Fortress bombers knocked out three of the base's hangars, all the runways, and damaged many of the grounded aircraft. Toward the waning days of the war, most of Germany's best radar technicians were sent to Landsberg Air Base.

In 1945, a U.S. Armored Division swept into the area. On 28 April the base was occupied.

In 1995, the publication "Das SS-Arbeitslager Landsberg 1944/45: Französische Widerstandskämpfer im deutschen KZ" by the Citizens´ Association “Landsberg in the 20th century” led by the critical local historian Anton Posset, made it known for the first time that in addition to the 11 concentration camps around Landsberg/Kaufering known at that time, there was another concentration camp in Landsberg, which was located on the Landsberg air base. Mainly French forced labourers were accommodated there. The camp was not subject to the Dachau concentration camp command. Among the forced laborers was Georges Charpak, who later won the Nobel Prize in Physics, and Gilbert Burlot. On the occasion of the 50th anniversary of the liberation of these concentration camps, a German-French commemorative plaque, donated by the Citizens' Association, was inaugurated on May 1, 1995 by Anton Posset and Marcel Miquet, vice president of the organization "Amicale des Anciens de Dachau" ("Association of Dachau Survivors") at the gymnasium on the air base.

=== USAF use ===
Company "C" of the U.S. Army Air Forces' 843rd Engineer Aviation Battalion arrived on 17 May to rehabilitate the base. A high priority was assigned to runway repair – to make the airfield operational. With the runway project completed, an Air Depot Group moved in and began repairing buildings for living quarters, mess facilities and so forth. The personnel moved from their tents into rebuilt quarters as they were completed. In January 1946 the 862nd Engineer Battalion arrived to complete the repair of bombed out facilities.

In 1947 the USAF 7280th Air Base Group was established at Landsberg as a detached unit of Erding Air Base. In 1949, the base was designated as Landsberg Air Base and placed under the command of the 2d Air Division. On 1 May 1950 the base support unit was designated the 7030th Headquarters Support Group.

During the Cold War, it was a United States Air Force base.

Major USAF Units stationed at Landsberg were:

- 1946–1948 Landsberg Air Ammunition Depot
- 1948–1950: 7280th Air Base Group (later 7280th Support Group)
- 1949–1951: 2d Air Division
- 1950–1953: 7030th Headquarters Support Group
- 1953-1954: 6900th Security Wing (United States Air Force Security Service)
- 1953–1955: 7351st Air Base Squadron
- 1955–1958: 7351st Flying Training Wing

=== German Air Force training ===
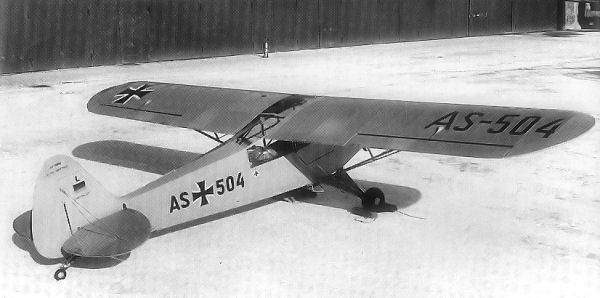
German Air Force Piper L-18C – 1956

The 7351st Air Base Squadron was activated in January 1953, and assumed control of Landsberg as the host unit on 1 July. On 1 April 1955 the 7351st Flying Training Group (MDAP) was activated to prepare Landsberg as a pilot training center. The group was further expanded and was designated the 7351st Flying Training Wing (MDAP) on 1 October 1955. The wing consisted of three groups, with a total of seven squadrons.

Having joined NATO in 1955, West Germany could begin to establish the German Air Force (Luftwaffe). Work soon started on the construction of airfields and training grounds and possibilities for training German pilots were investigated.

Landsberg Air Base was selected as the site for the retraining of the German Air Force. The first pilot training class of 19 German officers, all with previous flying experience, was received by 7351 PTG on 2 February 1956. There were still many World War II veterans who could, however, only fly propeller aircraft. They had not seen operational service for ten years and had absolutely no experience with supersonic jet fighters. The modern jets were not complete strangers to the former German officers, however. For more than two years it had already been quite usual for former Luftwaffe pilots to make familiarization flights on USAF jet fighters.

The new Luftwaffe began building up basic pilot training using forty Piper L-18A Super Cub trainers. Advanced training and jet transition was looked after by the USAF at Fürstenfeldbruck Air Base where the Luftwaffe could use several new Lockheed T-33A T-Bird jet-trainers. The first ten German jet fighter pilots trained by USAFE instructors received their 'wings' on 24 September 1956. Future German F-86 pilots were also trained at Nellis AFB in Nevada.

Training continued until 1958 when the 7351st FTG was discontinued and Landsberg turned over to the German Air Force. Within several years the new Luftwaffe would acquire hundreds of F-86 Sabres and F-84F Thunderstreaks via the U.S. Mutual Defense Aid Program (MDAP) so training had to be taken in hand very quickly.

After its formation in 1966, Helicopter Transport Wing 64 was stationed on the airbase until 1971.

== See also ==
- German Air Force
