= Helicopter Transport Wing 64 =

Hubschraubertransportgeschwader 64 (Helicopter Transport Wing 64)
- Active: 1966–1994
- Country: Germany
- Branch: German Air Force
- Type: Wing
- Role: SAR, tactical air transport
- Size: 120 helicopters in 1975, 39 at the time of disbanding
- Part of: Air Transport Command; Lufttransportkommando
- Garrison/HQ: Ahlhorner Heide Air Base

Commanders
- Current commander: Colonel Hans-Otto Eiger (until 30 September 1993)
- Notable commanders: Colonel Johannes Naumann

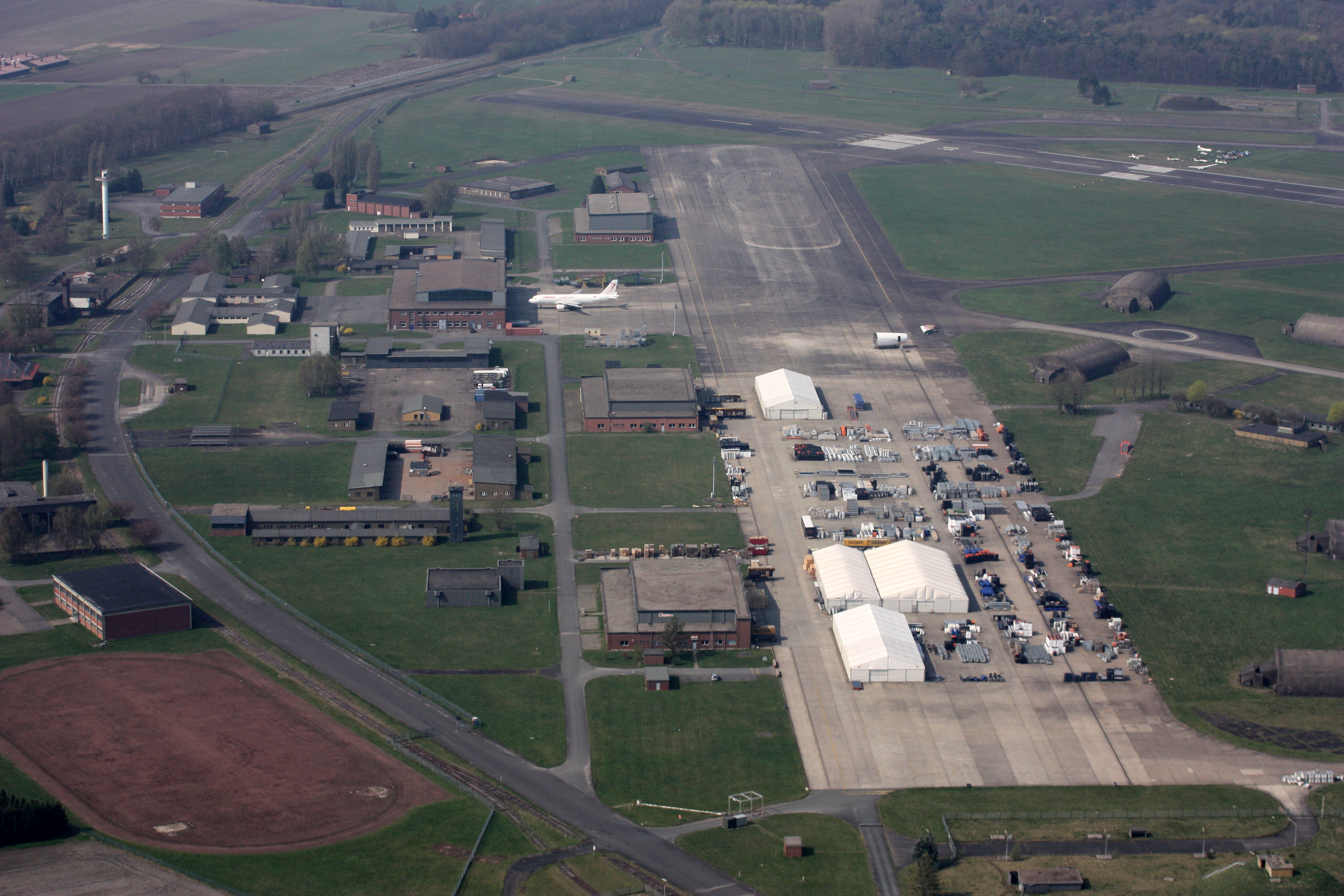
Ahlhorner Heide Air Base, last home of Helicopter Transport Wing 64

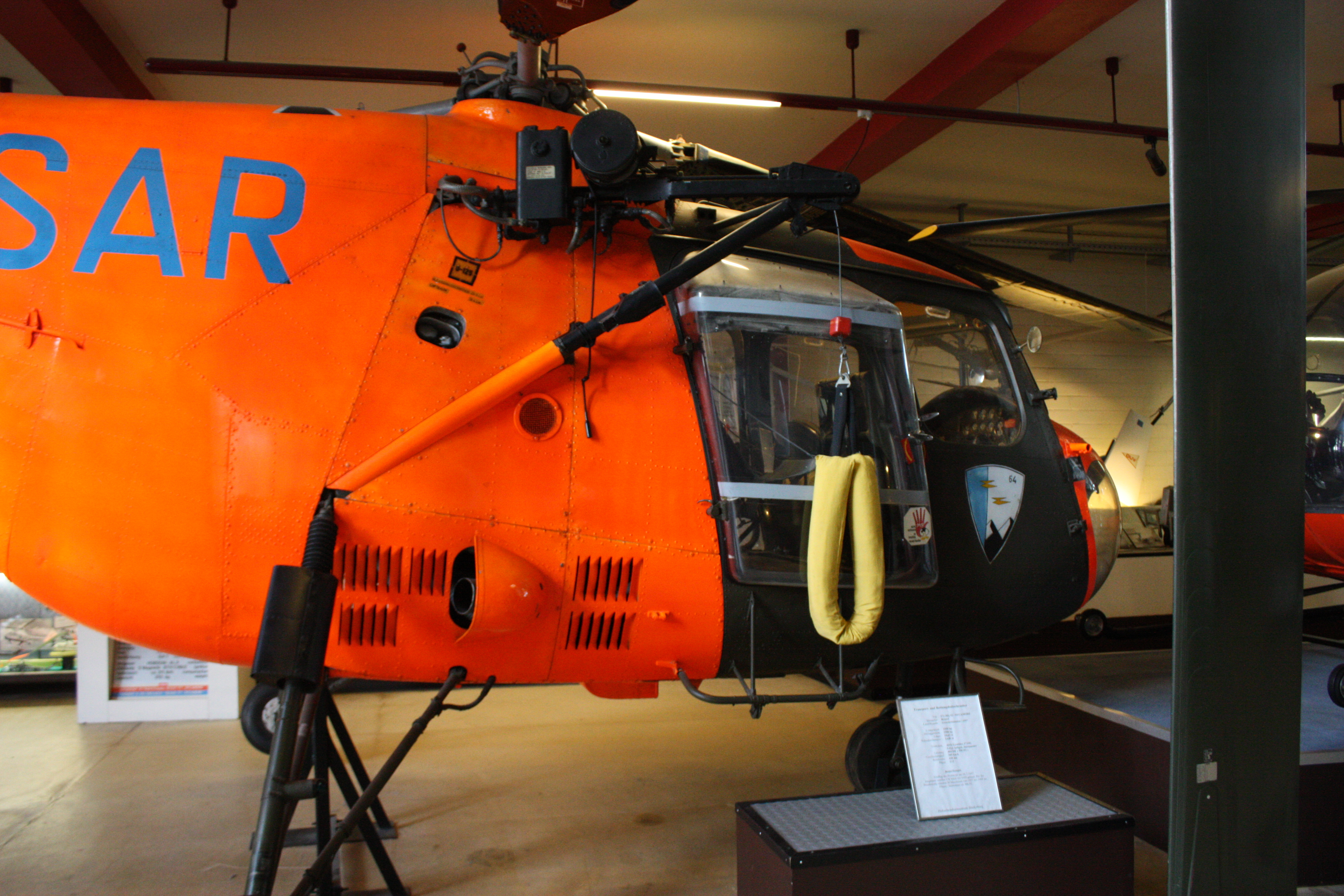
Bristol Sycamore of Helicopter Transport Wing 64

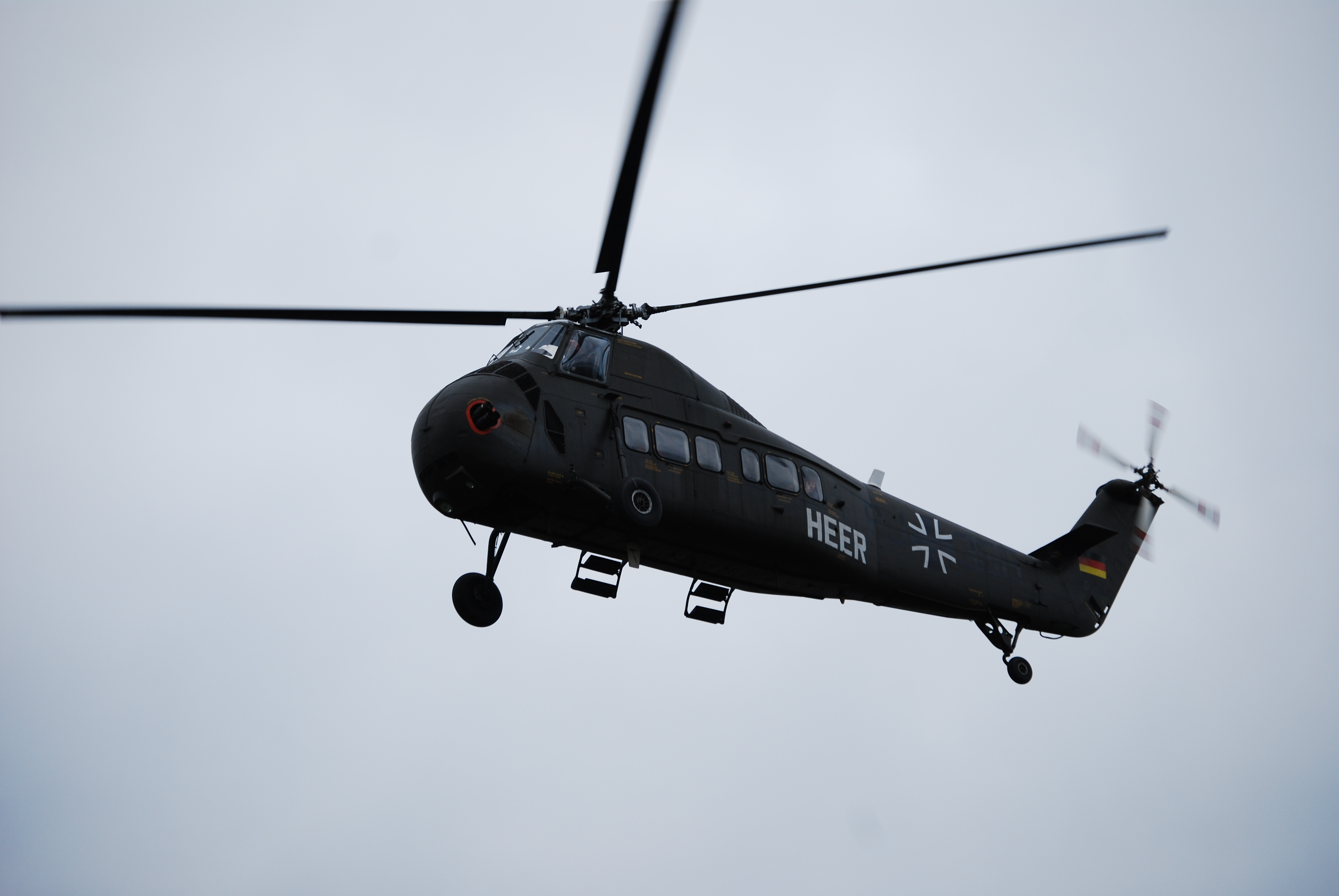
Sikorsky H-34

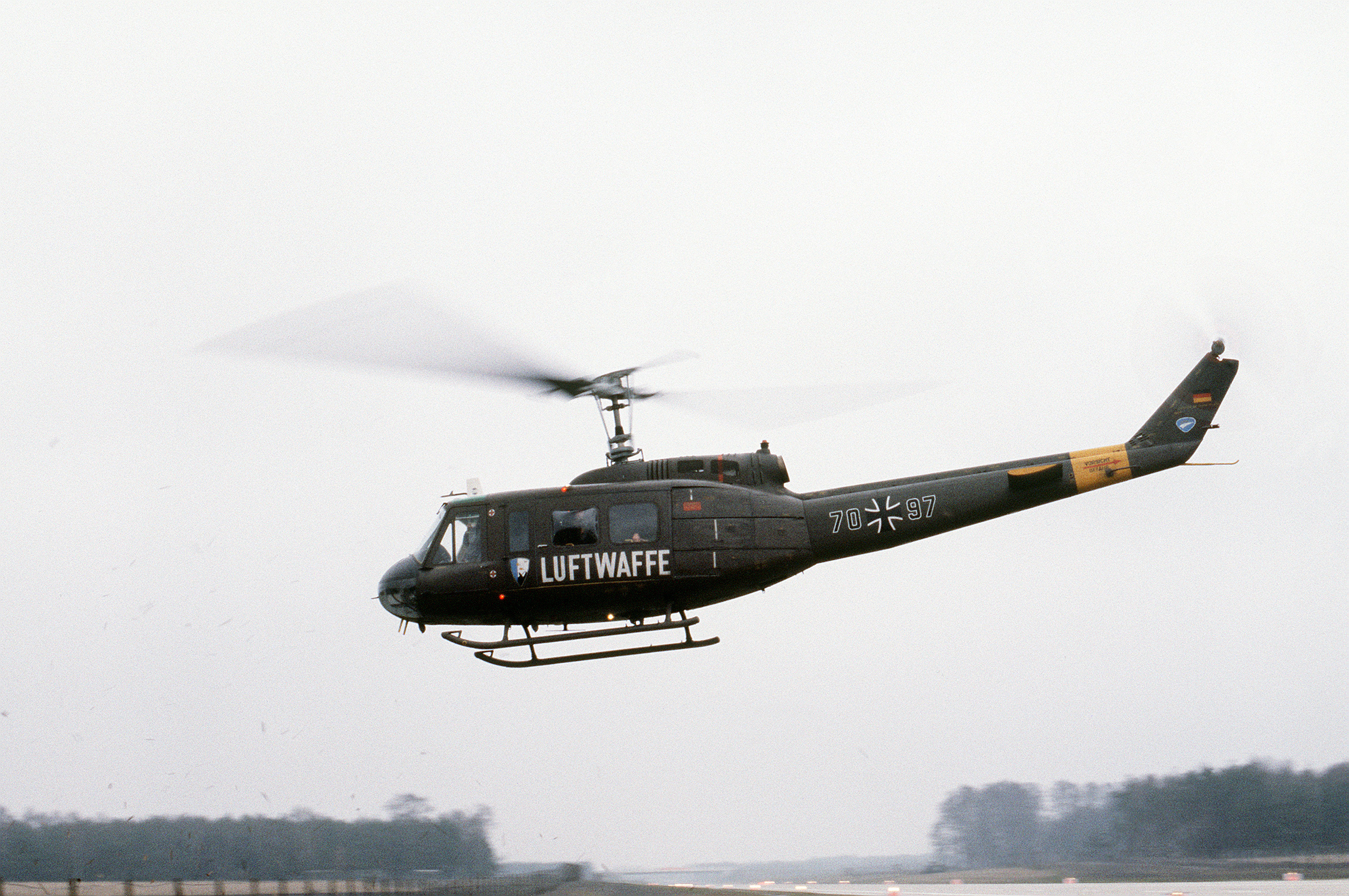
Bell UH-1D of Helicopter Transport Wing 64 in 1984

Helicopter Transport Wing 64 (German: Hubschraubertransportgeschwader 64) was a wing of the German Air Force (Luftwaffe). The wing was founded in 1966 and at the time of its disbanding based at Ahlhorner Heide Air Base which is situated in the southern suburbs of Ahlhorn in Lower Saxony, Germany.

== History ==
Helicopter Transport Wing 64 was established at Penzing Air Base in Bavaria on 1 October 1966 when personnel and equipment of three of the Air Force's helicopter SAR and liaison squadrons as well as parts of the Pilot Training School "A" were merged. No. 1 Training, Test and Transport Squadron was based at Fürstenfeldbruck Air Base, No. 2 SAR Squadron was stationed at Penzing Air Base, and No. 3 SAR Squadron at Faßberg Air Base. In May 1968, No 4. SAR Squadron was formed, also based at Penzing Air Base. Until 1968 the wing flew a variety of aircraft, amongst which were helicopters of the types Bristol Sycamore, Bell 47, Piasecki H-21 and Alouette II but also Dornier Do 27 fixed-wing aircraft. From February 1968 until May 1969 the introduction of the Bell UH-1D took place, replacing all other aircraft previously flown by Helicopter Transport Wing 64. In 1968, two squadrons of the wing were redeployed to Diepholz Air Base in Lower Saxony to form the 2nd Flying Group, only to be relocated to Ahlhorn Air Base in April 1971 when Air Transport Wing 62, the previous occupant of the air base, was disbanded. Three squadrons of Helicopter Transport Wing 64 were stationed at Ahlhorn Air Base with No 1 Squadron remaining at Penzing Air Base. With the disbanding of Air Transport Wing 62 and the incorporation of some of its helicopters and personnel into Helicopte Transport Wing 64, the wing was equipped with 78 helicopters. When the air force's helicopter training school at Faßberg Air Base was closed in 1975, the task of training new helicopter pilots was for a time assigned to Helicopter Transport Wing 64 which had a flight simulator at its disposal in one of the airbase's hangars. Flight training of helicopter pilots subsequently took part at Fort Rucker, Alabama, United States. The wing also incorporated the helicopters of the former training school into its squadrons. This meant that the wing had a capacity of almost 120 helicopters. In the following years, various helicopters of Helicopter Transport Wing 64 were stationed at a number of locations in northern and central Germany to fulfil their SAR role, such as at the military hospital in Koblenz, and the airbases at Jever and Faßberg. The wing also provided helicopters for SAR centres at Rheine Air Base and Hamburg. Still stationed at Penzing Air Base, No. 1 Squadron became subordinate to Air Transport Wing 61 in 1979.

Apart from routine deployment for SAR duties, helicopters of the wing were employed nationally and internationally for disaster relief operations. In the winter of 1969/1970 Helicopter Transport Wing 64 carried out relief flights to the East Frisian Islands which had been cut off from the mainland following heavy storms lasting for days. In 1969, it took part in a relief operation in Tunisia after heavy flooding. In the wake of the 1970 Bhola cyclone, Helicopter Transport Wing 64 flew supply missions to aid the population in what was then East Pakistan. In 1971, it took part in the relief effort after the Bingöl earthquake in Eastern Anatolia, Turkey. In 1973 the wing flew relief missions in Ethiopia during a period of severe drought. During the 1975 wildfires on Luneburg Heath Helicopter Transport Wing 64 was employed to assist the emergency services as well as during the snow disaster which afflicted Northern Germany in the winter of 1979/1980.

Following a re-organisation of the German Armed Forces, Helicopter Transport Wing 64 was officially disbanded on 1 April 1994. By then the wing had flown more than 500,00 hours on the Bell UH-1D, transporting more than 450,000 persons and 5,800 cargo. During SAR missions about 120,000 casualties were rescued. The majority of the wing's equipment, a total of 39 helicopters, and personnel was integrated into Air Transport Wing 62 which had been re-established in 1978. 19 helicopters of its naval squadron were integrated into Air Transport Wing 63. Other helicopters were assigned to the Federal Ministry of Defence's Transport Wing.

On 1 October 2010, Helicopter Wing 64 was formed at Holzdorf Air Base, being a new, helicopter-only wing of the German Air Force. It uses a slightly modified form of the original coat of arms of Helicopter Transport Wing 64.

== Tasks ==
The tasks of Helicopter Transport Wing 64 were:

- Flight training
- SAR
- Combat search and rescue (CSAR)
- Air ambulance
- Liaison

== Structure ==
At the time of its disbanding Helicopter Transport Wing 64 consisted of the following squadrons

- No. 2 Squadron
- No. 3 Squadron (naval squadron)
- No. 4 Squadron

== Equipment ==
Helicopter Transport Wing 64 flew the following aircraft:

- Bell H-13 Sioux
- Bristol Sycamore
- Alouette II
- Sikorsky H-34
- Piasecki H-21
- Dornier Do 27
- Bell UH-1D

== Accidents ==
Helicopter Transport Wing 64 lost a number of aircraft, all of them Bell UH-1D, due to accidents, mainly whilst performing SAR missions or during training exercises:

- On 14 May 1968, one aircraft crashed near Flintsbach and was damaged beyond repair.
- On 8 November 1968, one aircraft crashed near Goldenstedt and had to be written off.
- On 27 August 1969, one aircraft crashed near Mesum, killing all three occupants.
- On 11 June 1971, one aircraft crashed near Rosenheim and was damaged beyond repair.
- On 5 October 1972, a helicopter of Helicopter Transport Wing 64 collided with a German Air Force Lockheed F-104 Starfighter in mid-air near Berzhahn; in the subsequent crash all three occupants of the helicopter were killed.

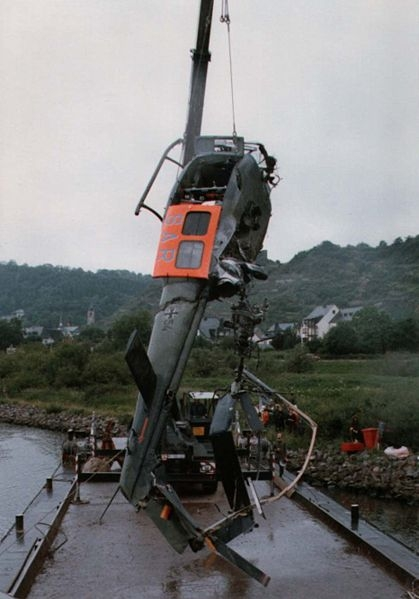
Crashed SAR helicopter of Helicopter Transport Wing 64 in 1990; both crew members were killed

- On 2 January 1973, one aircraft crashed near Tiefenthal and was damaged beyond repair.
- On 18 December 1973, one aircraft crashed near Beimerstetten and had to be written off.
- On 9 March 1974, one aircraft crashed whilst attempting to land on a jackup rig in the Baltic Sea.
- On 22 July 1974, a helicopter on a SAR mission crashed on a street in Hamburg after hitting a lamp post; whilst none of the occupants was injured, one bystander on the ground was hit by parts of the rotor blades; the helicopter was subsequently repaired.
- On 23 June 1975, one aircraft crashed into the Königsbach, a tributary of the river Rhine, near Koblenz and was damaged beyond repair.
- On 20 February 1976, one aircraft crashed into the Jade Bight and had to be written off.
- On 25 April 1976, one aircraft crashed near Koblenz and was damaged beyond repair.
- On 12 October 1976, one aircraft crashed on a mountain flying exercise into the Grießkar, part of the Wetterstein mountain range, near Garmisch-Partenkirchen and to be written off.
- On 6 December 1978, one aircraft was ditched into the North Sea after suffering from engine failure whilst approaching a research platform off the island of Heligoland; all seven occupants were rescued and the aircraft was subsequently salvaged.
- On 11 December 1980, a helicopter while on ambulance service crashed near Wermelskirchen killing the patient and injuring the crew of three; the helicopter was damaged beyond repair.
- On 8 September 1982, one aircraft crashed near Aumühle and had to be written off.
- On 6 January 1988, on approaching Varrelbusch Airport one aircraft overturned, injuring both crew members and damaging the helicopter beyond repair.
- On 4 May 1989, one aircraft crashed on a SAR mission near Stolberg; the aircraft had to be written off but was moved to Roth Air Base to be used for instruction purposes.
- On 7 June 1990, one aircraft (SAR Koblenz 73) hit the cables of an overhead power line whilst being on a SAR mission in the valley of the river Moselle near Dieblich and crashed on the embankment of the river, killing both crew members; the helicopter was damaged beyond repair.

== See also ==
- Helicopter Wing 64
- German Air Force
- German Army Aviation Corps
- List of airports in Germany
