= Untermühlhausen =

- Ortsteil of Penzing
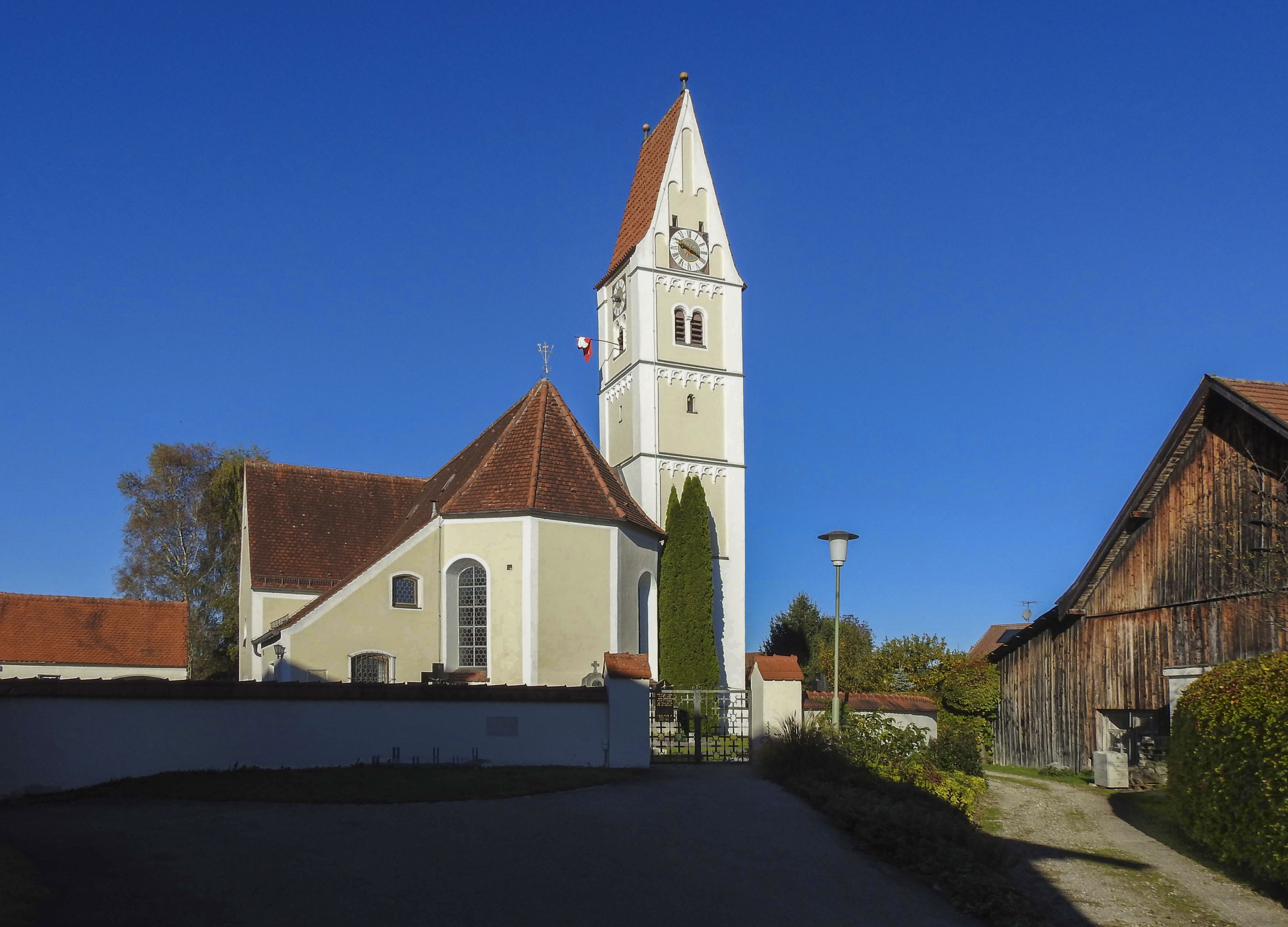
- Church of Saint Benedict

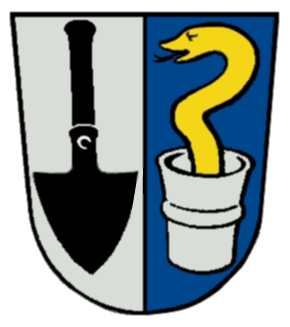
- Coat of arms
- Interactive map of Untermühlhausen
- Location within Germany Location within Bavaria
- Coordinates: 48°05′32″N 10°54′50″E
- Country: Germany
- State: Bavaria
- Admin. region: Oberbayern
- District: Landsberg am Lech
- Municipality: Penzing
- Elevation: 595 m (1,952 ft)

Population
  - Total: 400
- Time zone: UTC+01:00 (CET)
  - Summer (DST): UTC+02:00 (CEST)
- Vehicle registration: LL

Untermühlhausen is a village in the district of Landsberg in Bavaria, Germany. It is part of the municipality of Penzing.
