= Penzing, Bavaria =

Penzing
- Municipality
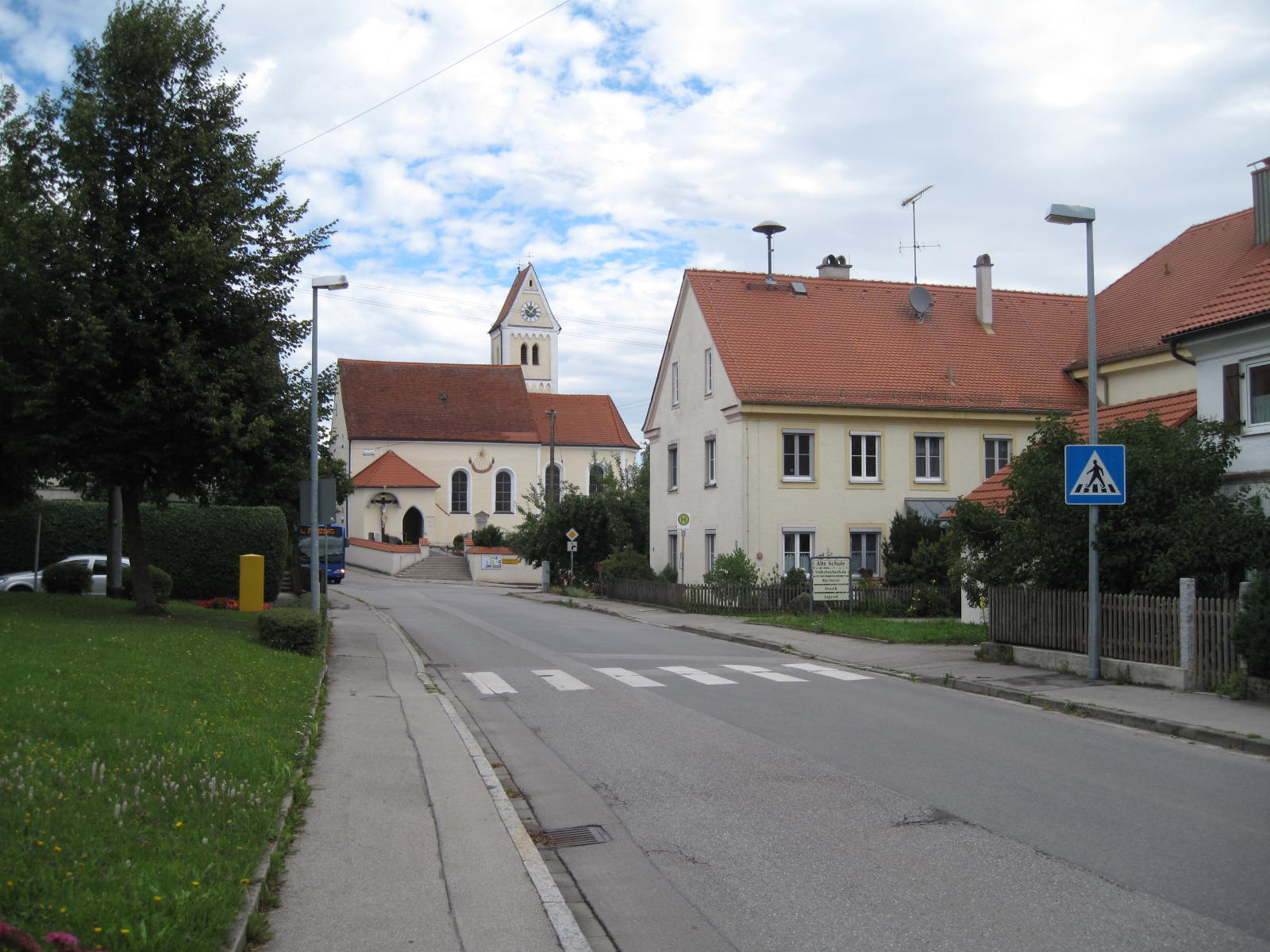
- Center of Penzing with the Church of Saint Martin

- Coat of arms

- Location of Penzing within Landsberg am Lech district
- Interactive map of Penzing
- Location within Germany Location within Bavaria
- Coordinates: 48°04′20″N 10°55′40″E
- Country: Germany
- State: Bavaria
- Admin. region: Oberbayern
- District: Landsberg am Lech

Government
  - Mayor (2020–26): Peter Hammer (CSU)

Area
  - Total: 33.8 km^{2} (13.1 sq mi)
- Elevation: 620 m (2,030 ft)

Population (2025-12-31)
  - Total: 4,248
  - Density: 126/km^{2} (326/sq mi)
- Time zone: UTC+01:00 (CET)
  - Summer (DST): UTC+02:00 (CEST)
- Postal codes: 86929
- Dialling codes: 08191
- Vehicle registration: LL
- Website: www.penzing.de

Penzing (German pronunciation: [ˈpɛntsɪŋ]) is a municipality in the district of Landsberg in Bavaria in Germany.
