= Army Aviation Corps =

Army Aviation Corps may refer to:

- Army Aviation Corps (Germany), the army aviation element of the German Army
- Army Aviation Corps (India), the army aviation element of the Indian Army
- Australian Army Aviation Corps
- Pakistan Army Aviation Corps

== See also ==
- Army Air Corps (disambiguation)
- List of army aviation units for other units that may also be informally termed Air Corps
