= School of Army Aviation (Germany) =

Coordinates: 52°17′03″N 9°05′09″E

School of Army Aviation (Germany) Heeresfliegerwaffenschule
- Active: 1 July 1959 — present
- Country: Germany
- Branch: Army
- Type: Training School
- Role: Flight Training, Development
- Part of: German Army Aviation Corps
- Garrison/HQ: Bückeburg; Celle; Le Luc (France)

Commanders
- Current commander: Brig. Gen. Ulrich Ott

Insignia
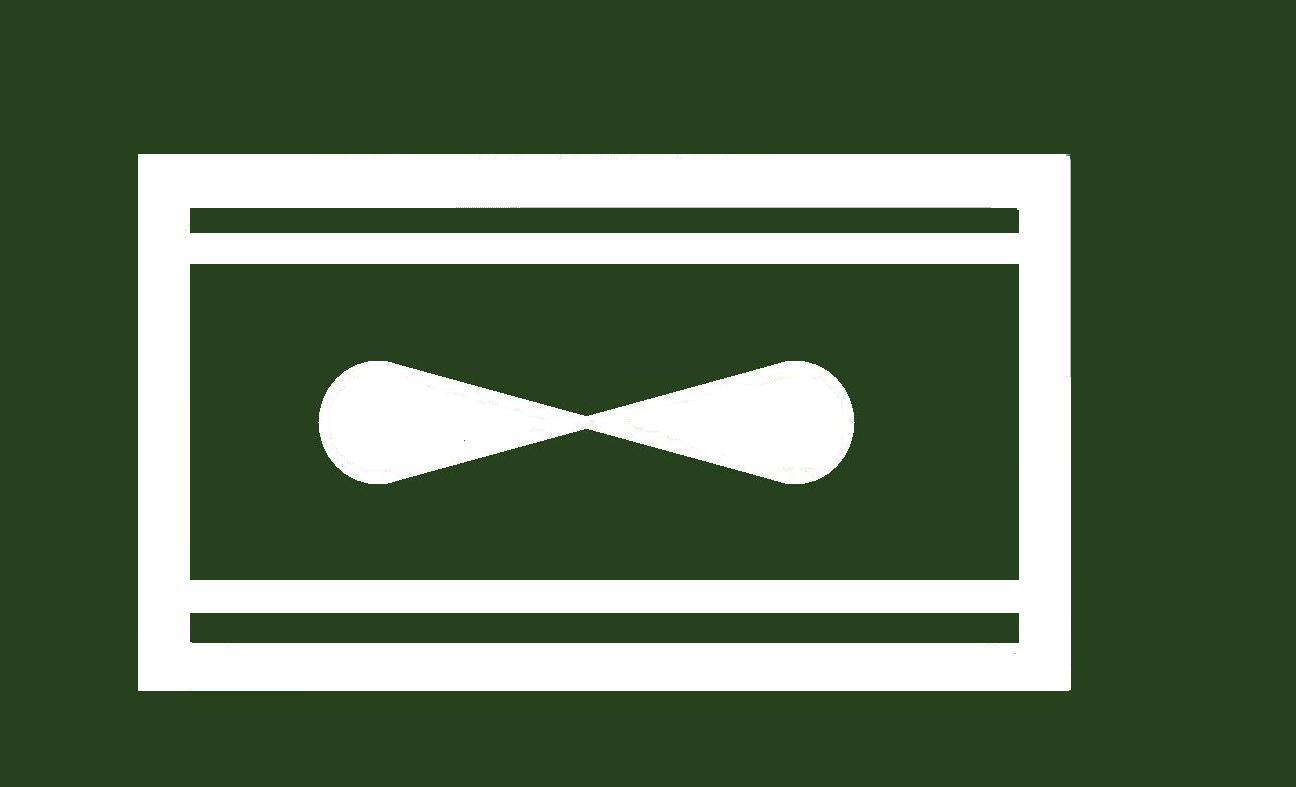
- APP-6A symbol

The German School of Army Aviation (Heeresfliegerwaffenschule) based at Bückeburg, is one of the schools of the German Army and is responsible for the training and development of the German Army Aviation Corps' personnel and equipment. Furthermore, the basic training of helicopter pilots of the other components of the German Armed Forces also takes place at the School of Army Aviation.

The School of Army Aviation was founded on 1 July 1959 and based first at Mendig before being transferred on 12 January 1960 to its current location at Bückeburg Air Base, utilising the facilities of RAF Bückeburg, constructed by the Royal Air Force in 1946 and closed in the mid-1950s.

In October 2011 the German Federal Ministry of Defence announced a reorganisation/reduction of the German Armed Forces. Due to the reduction of helicopter units within the German Army, some of which are to be disbanded whereas others are to be transferred to the German Air Force, and also in light of the already existing international character of training helicopter pilots, the School of Army Aviation (Heeresfliegerwaffenschule) will be renamed to International Helicopter Training Centre. Training of helicopter pilots of the other components of the German Armed Forces (Air Force and Navy) at Bückeburg started in 2011.

== Organisation ==
The head and commanding officer the German School of Army Aviation has the rank of brigadier general and the position of General of the Army Aviation Corps (General der Heeresflieger). The school is structured in:

- Staff
- Support Group
- Technical Maintenance Department
- Development Group
- Instruction Group

Staff of the German Armed Forces' Central Medical Services, amongst which are a high-ranking flight surgeon and flight psychologist, are also incorporated into the school.

Apart from the actual flight training, modern high-end flight simulators are extensively used during the training of future military helicopter pilots.

Together with the French Army Light Aviation the Franco-German Training Centre TIGER at Le Luc – Le Cannet Airport in Le Cannet-des-Maures was established, solely dedicated to provide flying instruction on the Eurocopter Tiger.

== Units ==
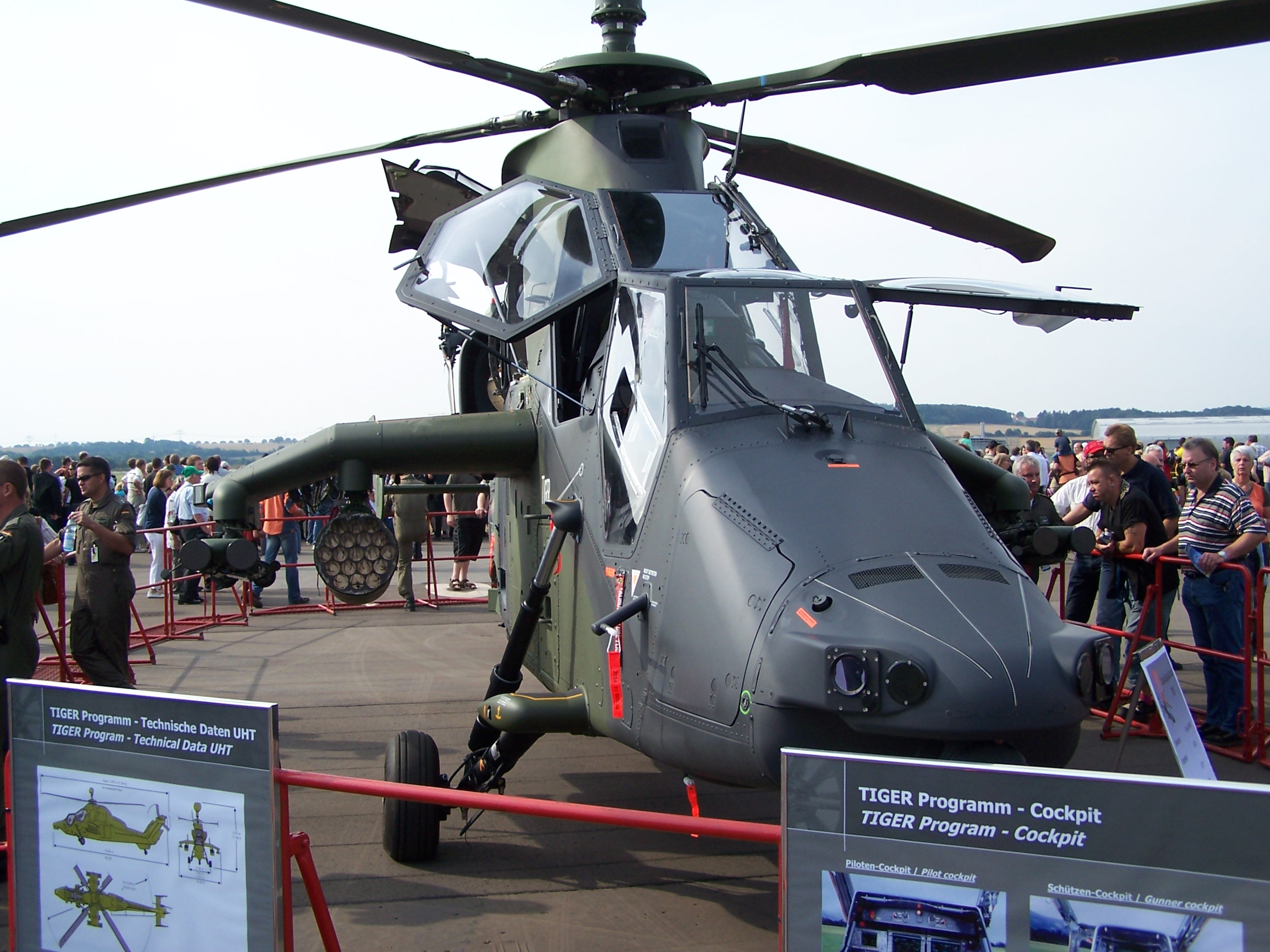
Eurocopter Tiger of the German Army

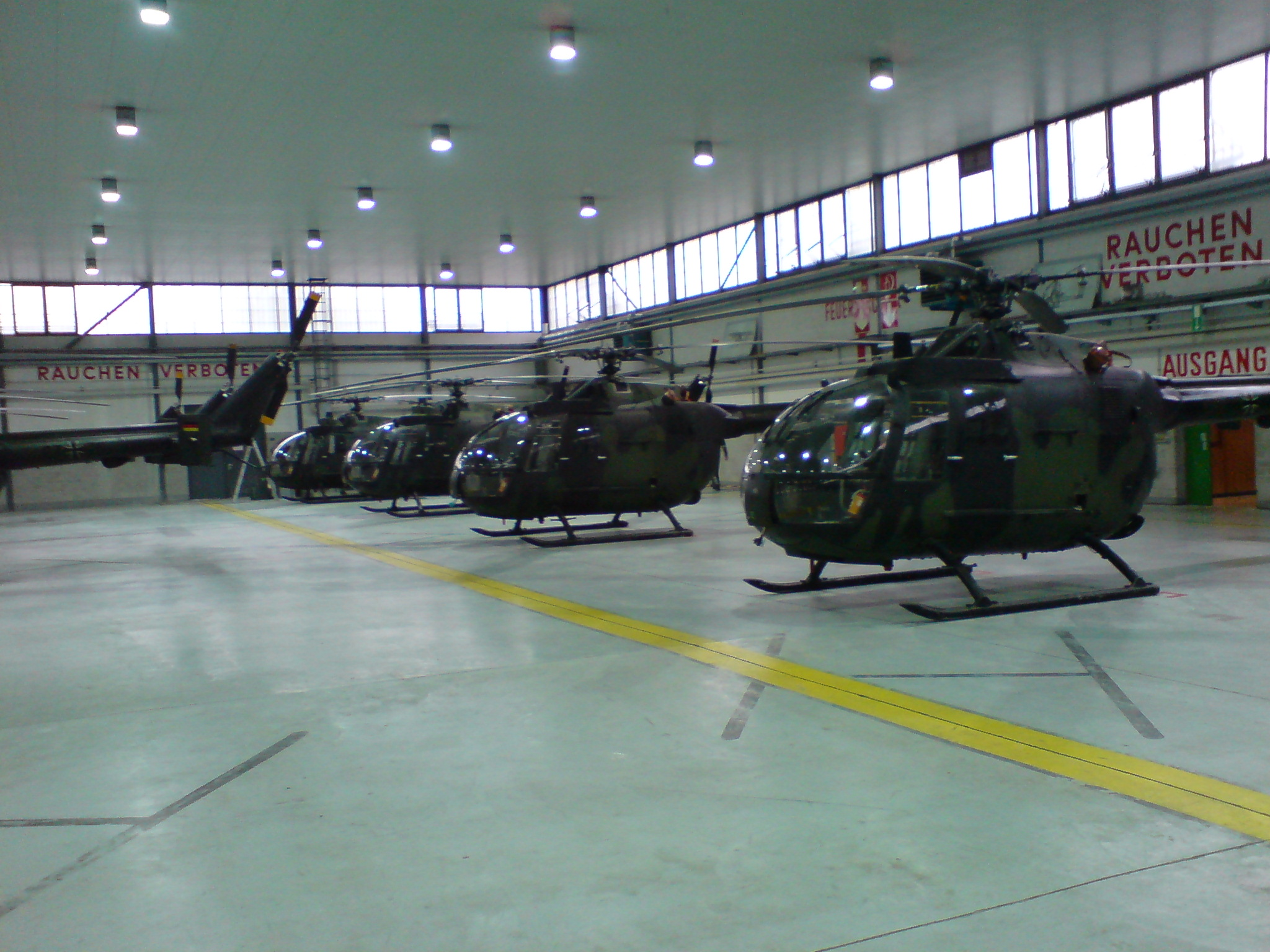
Bo 105s of the German Army in a hangar

Name of unit	Based at
Staff HQ	Bückeburg
Instruction Group A (flying instruction)	Bückeburg
Instruction Group B (non-flying instruction)	Bückeburg
Training Centre C (flying instruction)	Celle
Army Aviation Test Squadron 910*	Bückeburg
Research And Development Group	Bückeburg
Technical Maintenance Department	Bückeburg
Franco-German Training Centre	Le Luc - Le Cannet-des-Maures

* (disbanded on 31 December 2008)

== See also ==
- German Army Aviation Corps
- History of the German Army Aviation Corps
- German Army
- Army aviation
- Army aviation school
