= Sa Pran Nak Army Airport =

Military airport in Thailand

Sa Pran Nak Army Airport
- Part of Royal Thai Army (RTA)
- 17 kilometres (11 mi) northeast of Lop Buri
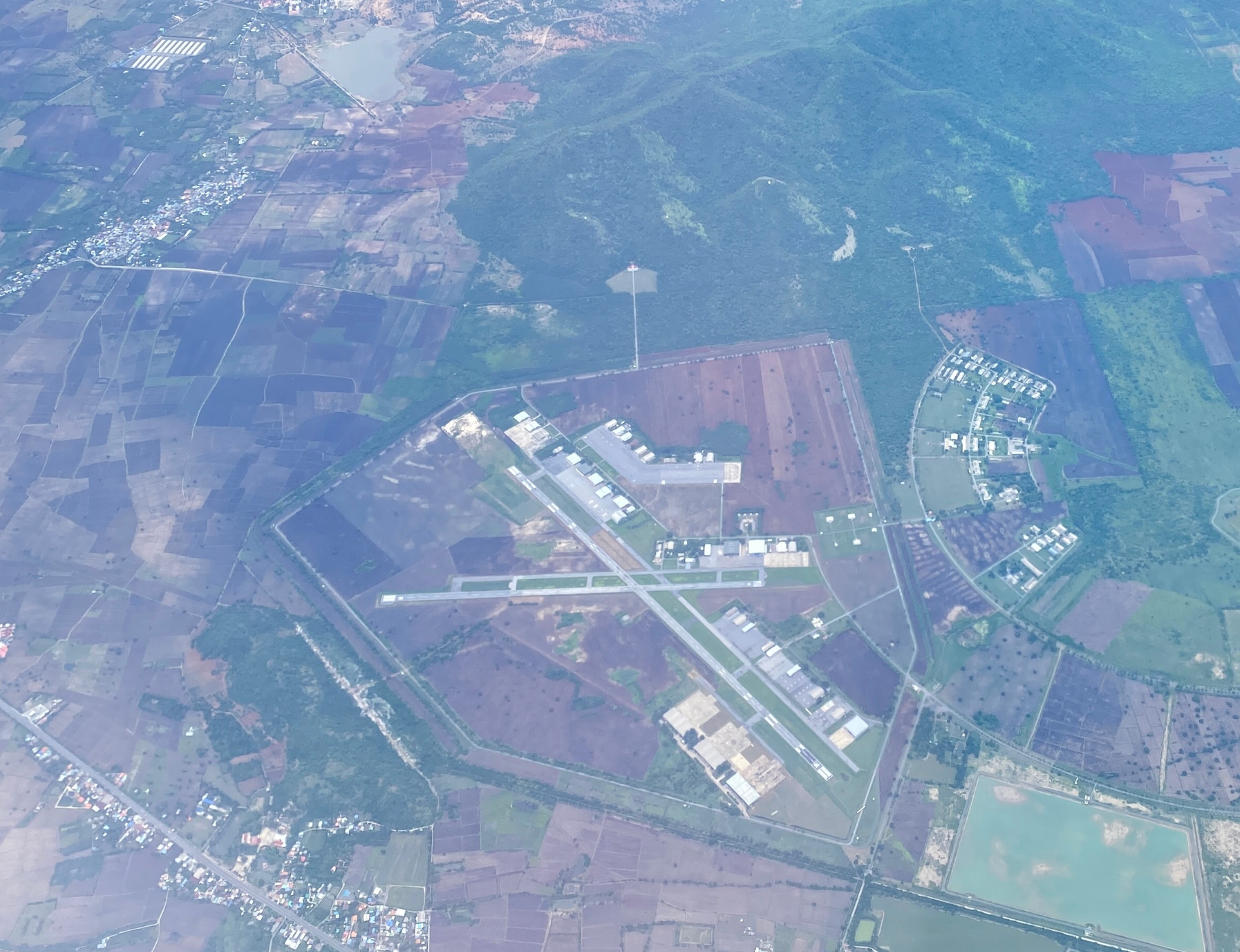
- Aerial photograph of Sa Pran Nak Army Airport taken in 15 July, 2024.

Site information
- Type: Air Force Base
- Owner: Royal Thai Army
- Operator: Royal Thai Army Aviation Center

Location
- Coordinates: 14°57′07″N 100°38′39″E

Site history
- Built: 1971; 55 years ago

Airfield information
- Identifiers: ICAO: VTBH
- Elevation: 29 metres (95 ft) AMSL
Runways
Direction	Length and surface
01/19	457 metres (1,499 ft)
06/24	457 metres (1,499 ft)

Sa Pran Nak Army Airport (ICAO: VTBH) is a base of the Royal Thai Army Aviation Center. It is located in Khok Kathiam, Mueang Lopburi District, in Lopburi Province, Thailand. The airport was opened in 1971 to separate the Army Aviation School from the Royal Thai Air Force following three years of construction.

== History ==
On 5 September 1967, the Flying School, originally under the Artillery Center, became independent with the formal establishment of the Army Aviation School. Colonel Manu Srisomboon, the school's commander, proposed relocating the school to Khao Sa Pran Nak. Afterwards, construction began on an airfield, hangars, offices, government officers' housing, and ancillary facilities at a budget of 250 million baht. At the time, the flight school shared base with the 2nd Air Wing of the Royal Thai Air Force in Khok Kathiam Air Force Base.

Following completion in 1971, the base began housing the Army Aviation School. By 1972, the aviation school was transformed into the Army Aviation Department, and then into the Army Aviation Center by 2 September 1977. It comprised flight training aircraft of the flight school and operational aircraft of various units of the army. Today, fixed-wing aircraft and rotary-wing aircraft operate from the airfield.

In March 2023, Mil Mi-17 helicopters of the 41st Aviation Regiment arrived Sa Pran Nak Army Airport to launch flight surveys over wildfires in the Khao Laem Ya area, and help support efforts to extinguish the fire.

== Facilities ==
Sa Pran Nak Army Airport is equipped with a DVOR/DME and a Non-directional beacon. It has two runways, 0/19 and 06/24 both measuring 457 meters long and 30 meters wide. The runways have a maximum load capacity of 21,000 kilograms (21 tons), and is capable of supporting C-212 Aviocar aircraft. Ground services include three JP-8 fuel trucks, one 100LL (Avgas) fuel truck. Fire and rescue services are equipped with three trucks with a capacity of 1,000 to 4,500 liters of water and 400 to 600 liters of foam.

== Commanders ==
The following is an incomplete list of those who served as the Commander of the Army Aviation Center at Sa Pran Nak Army Airport:

- 1977 — 1981: Major General Sathian Nilkamhaeng (พลตรี เสถียร นิลกำแหง) as Commander
- 1981 — 1983: General Sunthorn Kongsompong (พลเอก สุนทร คงสมพงษ์) as Deputy Commander
- By 1987: Major General W. Chaikla as Commander
- Unknown: General Nipon Chaiyaburin (พลเอก นิพนธ์ ไชยะบุรินทร์) as Commander

== Units ==
The following lists the units that are based in Sa Pran Nak Army Airport:

Royal Thai Army Aviation Center

- 1st Aviation Battalion, equipped with Eurocopter Fennec, Bell 212, AgustaWestland AW139, and AgustaWestland AW149 helicopters
- 2nd Aviation Battalion, equipped with Bell 212 helicopter
- 3rd Aviation Battalion, equipped with AH-1F and Bell 212 helicopters
- 9th Aviation Battalion, equipped with Bell 212 and Sikorsky UH-60 Black Hawk helicopters
- 21st Aviation Battalion, equipped with Beriev Be-200, Cessna 182 Skylane, Cessna 185 Skywagon, Kodiak 100, Pilatus PC-12, Searcher Mk II (UAV), and Hermes 450 (UAV) aircraft
- 41st Aviation Battalion, equipped with Eurocopter UH-72 Lakota, Eurocopter EC145, and Mi-17V-5 helicopters

== Accidents & incidents ==
- In 1977, a Cessna T-41 of the Army Aviation Center departed Sa Pra Nak Army Airport to assess the flying proficiency of Army pilots serving in border provinces. However, the flight—containing three instructors—were expected in Nakhon Si Thammarat that afternoon and failed to arrive. The aircraft was reported to have overturned and crash into the forest from heavy rains and turbulence during severe weather over Khao Luang. That following day, the receiving unit concluded that the an accident had occurred and Army helicopter crews searched for the wreck. The wreckage was located, and it was destroyed using machine gunfire after concluding that it was unsalvageable. Two days later, the three instructors walked out of the mountains alive, exhausted and with torn clothing. Today, the crash site is known locally as San Khrueang Bin tok (aircraft-crash ridge).

== See also ==
- Khok Kathiam Air Force Base
