= Army Air Corps =

Army Air Corps may refer to the following army aviation corps:

- Army Air Corps (United Kingdom), the army aviation element of the British Army
- Philippine Army Air Corps (1935–1941)
- United States Army Air Corps (1926–1942), or its predecessors or successors

== See also ==
- Army Aviation Corps (disambiguation)
- List of army aviation units for other units that may also be informally termed Air Corps
