= Army Aviation School =

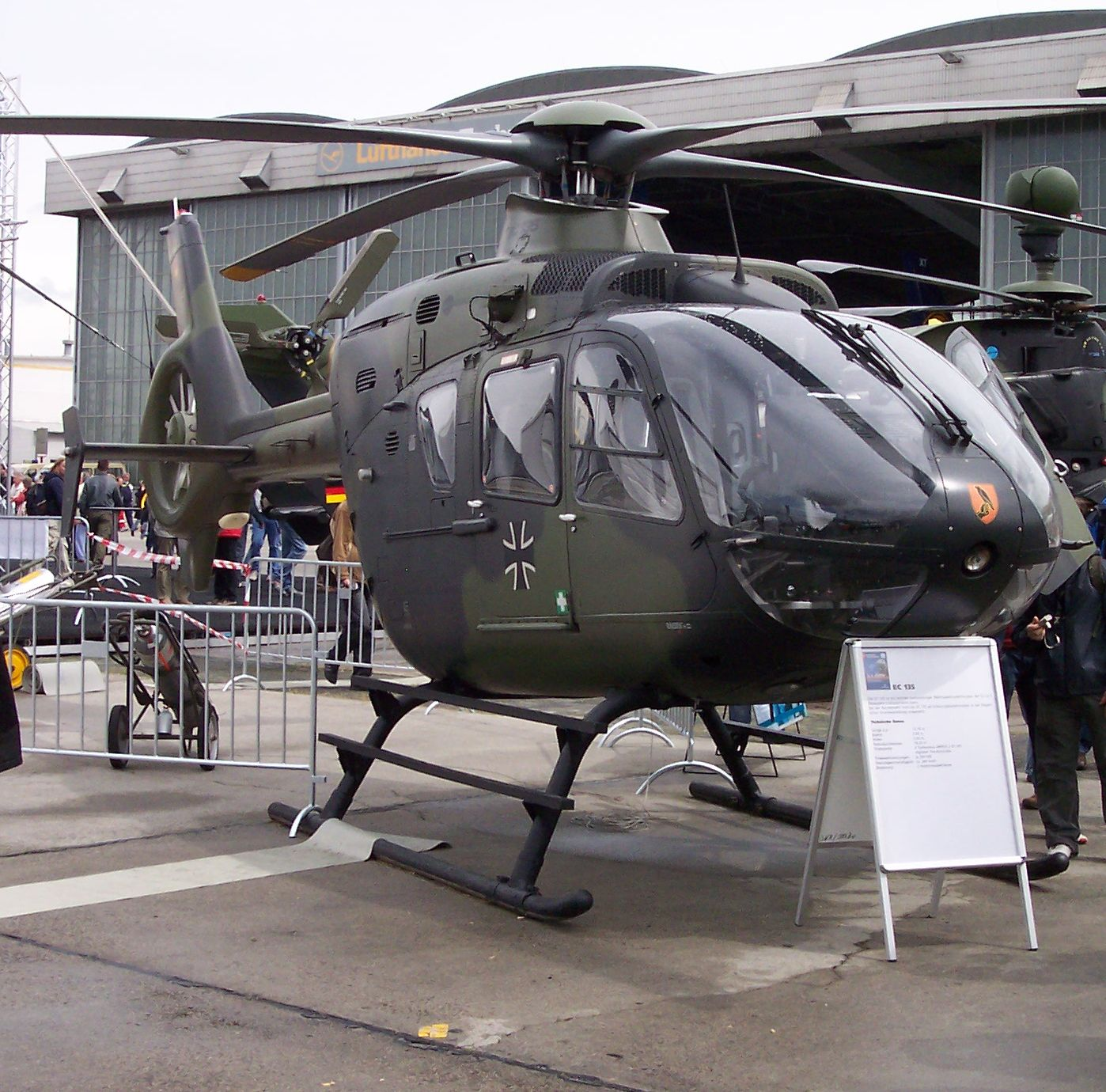
Eurocopter EC 135 as used by German Army Aviation School

An Army Aviation School is a military educational establishment responsible for the training and development of the personnel and equipment of the aviation element in those armies that have a separate aviation branch.

== Tasks ==
Army Aviation Schools' tasks encompass the teaching of a variety of skills related to aviation and related subjects particularly with regards to the tactical role army aviation plays in its respective land component of the armed forces.

=== Flying ===
Potential pilots are trained by using flight simulators and especially designed training aircraft. The aircraft of most army aviation branches consist mainly of helicopters which means that the emphasis naturally lies in training pilots to fly the various aircraft. However, some army aviation branches also employ fixed-wing aircraft, used mostly for aerial reconnaissance and liaison purposes, so prospective pilots may also be trained to fly these aircraft. The accurate use of the numerous weapon systems is also part of the flight training.

=== Technical ===
A further task of army aviation schools is to train the personnel, particularly the groundcrews, in the technical, electrical and electronic maintenance of the various aircraft and weapon systems.

=== Development ===
Incorporated into some army aviation schools is a research and development department which is tasked with devising improvements of the aircraft and the weapons, testing and preparing them for new roles and carrying out tactical and logistical research aiming at improving and developing the efficiency and concepts under which the various army aviation components are supposed to fulfil their tasks

=== Medical ===
Specific medical training for flying personnel, flight surgeons and flight psychologists is also given at some army aviation schools. In the United States this training is provided at the separate US Army School of Aviation Medicine at Fort Rucker.

== List of national army aviation schools ==
- American Army Aviation School
- British Army Aviation Centre
- German School of Army Aviation
