= Republic of Korea Army aviation =

The Republic of Korea Army Aviation is the army aviation branch of the Republic of Korea Army. It is equipped with helicopters in the liaison, transport and light attack roles.

== Aircraft ==
Aircraft	Type	Version	Produced	Quantity	Notes
Bell Helicopter UH-1	Utility Transport	UH-1H/N	1965~1978	129	
Sikorsky Aircraft UH-60	Utility Transport	UH-60P	1990~1999	140	Built under license by Korean Air
Boeing CH-47 Chinook	Heavy Transport	CH-47D CH-47DLR	1988~1998	17 6	ROKA received a total of 18 CH-47D and 6 CH-47DLR
KAI KUH-1 Surion	Utility Transport	KUH-1	2012~	10 (258 planned)	planned to replace the UH-1 and MD-500
MD Helicopters MD 500	Light Attack Light Attack	MD 500 Defender MD 500 TOW Defender	1976~1988	207 50	Built under license by Korean Air
Bell Helicopter AH-1 Cobra	Attack	AH-1F/S	1977~1991	90	being upgraded
Messerschmitt Bo 105	Light Attack	Bo 105CBS	1999~2000	12	Built under license by KAI
KAH	Attack	KAI KAH (Korean attack helicopter)	2018~	(Planned 200)	planned to replace the MD-500
AH-64 Apache	Attack	AH-64E Guardian	2016~2018	36	Promoting the introduction of additional 48 units
