= KAI KUH-1 Surion =

South Korean utility helicopter

KUH-1 Surion
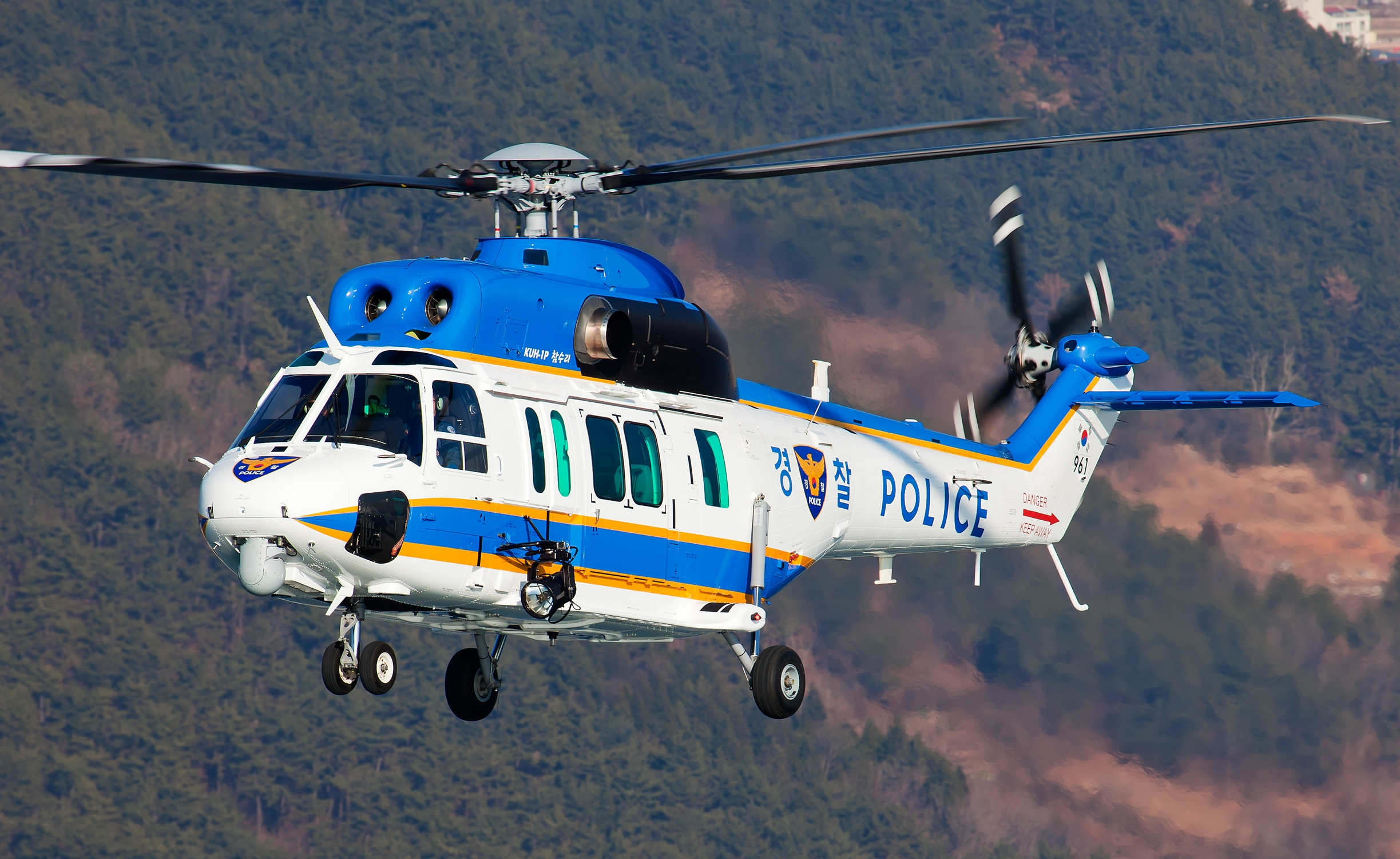
- KAI KUH-1 utility helicopter

General information
- Type: Medium utility helicopter
- Role: Transport
- National origin: South Korea
- Manufacturer: Korea Aerospace Industries
- Designer: Agency for Defense Development (mission equipment package); Korea Aerospace Industries (with technical assistance from Eurocopter)
- Status: In service
- Primary users: Republic of Korea Army National Police Agency (South Korea)
- Number built: 218+ (including derivatives)

History
- Introduction date: 22 May 2013
- First flight: 10 March 2010
- In service: 2013–present
- Developed from: Eurocopter AS332 Super Puma

The KAI KUH-1 Surion is a twin-engine, transport utility helicopter developed primarily by Korea Aerospace Industries (KAI), Agency for Defense Development (ADD) and Korea Aerospace Research Institute (KARI) jointly with Eurocopter. In 2006, the research and development phase of the Korea Helicopter Project - Korea Utility Helicopter (KHP-KUH), costing around ₩1.3 trillion (equivalent to ₩1.99 trillion or US$1.49 billion in 2025), was launched by the Agency for Defense Development. In 2012, full-scale production of the Surion began. KAI is the principal manufacturer of the type.

An initial force of around 245 Surions have been ordered by the Republic of Korea Army to replace their aging fleets of UH-1H utility helicopters and 500MD light utility helicopters, which have been in service for decades. KAI will also construct civilian and law enforcement variants of the helicopter.

In 2017, the Surion was the centerpiece of an embezzlement scandal involving parent company KAI, the South Korean Ministry of National Defense and its Defense Acquisition Program Administration.

== Development ==
=== Origins ===
In December 2005, the South Korean government appointed Eurocopter as the primary partner to KAI for the then-formative Korea Helicopter Project - Korea Utility Helicopter (KHP-KUH). In June 2006, KAI and Eurocopter won the KHP-KUH ₩1.3 trillion (equivalent to ₩1.99 trillion or US$1.49 billion in 2025) research and development contract from the Defense Acquisition Program Administration (DAPA) to start the project. It remains Seoul's biggest arms deal ever with a non-US company. The development of the aircraft was funded 84% by the South Korean government and 16% by Korea Aerospace Industries (KAI) and Eurocopter. At the time, it was the biggest South Korean defense contract to be issued to a non-American defense company.

A production contract worth about ₩4.4 trillion (equivalent to ₩5.71 trillion or US$4.26 billion in 2025) is expected to be signed around 2011 before the start of mass production. Eurocopter took a stake of 30 percent in the 2006-2012 development phase and 20 percent in the following ten-year production phase, KAI and the South Korean government held the remaining stakes in the program. As the prime sub-contractor, Eurocopter has provided technical assistance in part for developing the power transmission, main gearbox, boom and tail gearboxes, automatic flight control system and rotor mast. Eurocopter experts were dispatched to KAI premises in Sacheon, South Korea, to provide support and teach KAI engineers state of the art processes and technologies for the design and manufacture of helicopters.

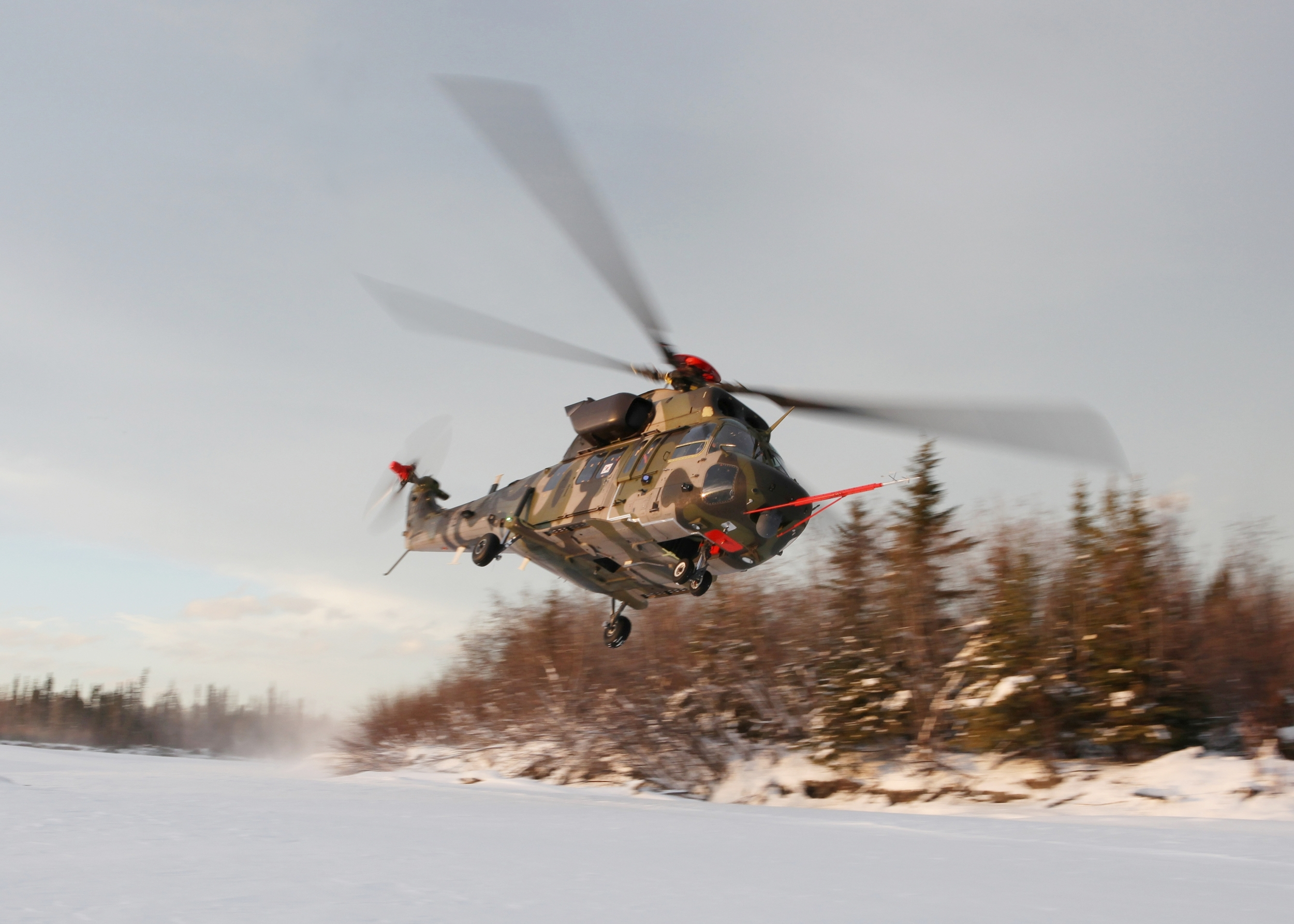
A KUH-1 Surion prototype during cold weather test in Alaska, 2012

In June 2008, KAI announced that the first prototype KUH was to be rolled in the following month and that ground tests would begin later that year. The firm stated that it aimed to conduct the type's first flight in early 2010 and for the first production aircraft to be delivered in 2013. In August 2009, the first prototype was unveiled by President Lee Myung-bak at an unveiling ceremony in Sacheon. In October 2009, it was announced that the program was to be delayed as the result of several ministries having received reduced budgets as greater priority had been placed on social welfare programs; the Ministry of National Defense announced that stability of existing defense programs had been assured.

On 10 March 2010, KAI announced that a prototype had performed the maiden flight of the Surion. Two test pilots and an engineer performed a series of taxiing and hovering maneuvers, as well as a stationary hover at 30 ft (9.1m), during this initial flight. In May 2010, following three months of flight testing, the prototype performed its first public flight demonstration. In January 2011, Eurocopter and KAI established a joint venture, KAI-EC, for the purposes of marketing the Surion and handling export sales. At the time, it was envisioned that 250-300 units would be sold worldwide by 2021. In December 2012, deliveries of the first Surion model began. In February 2013, low temperature testing in Alaska, United States, was completed, leading to development of the KUH-1 Surion being formally recognized as completed in March.

=== Further development ===
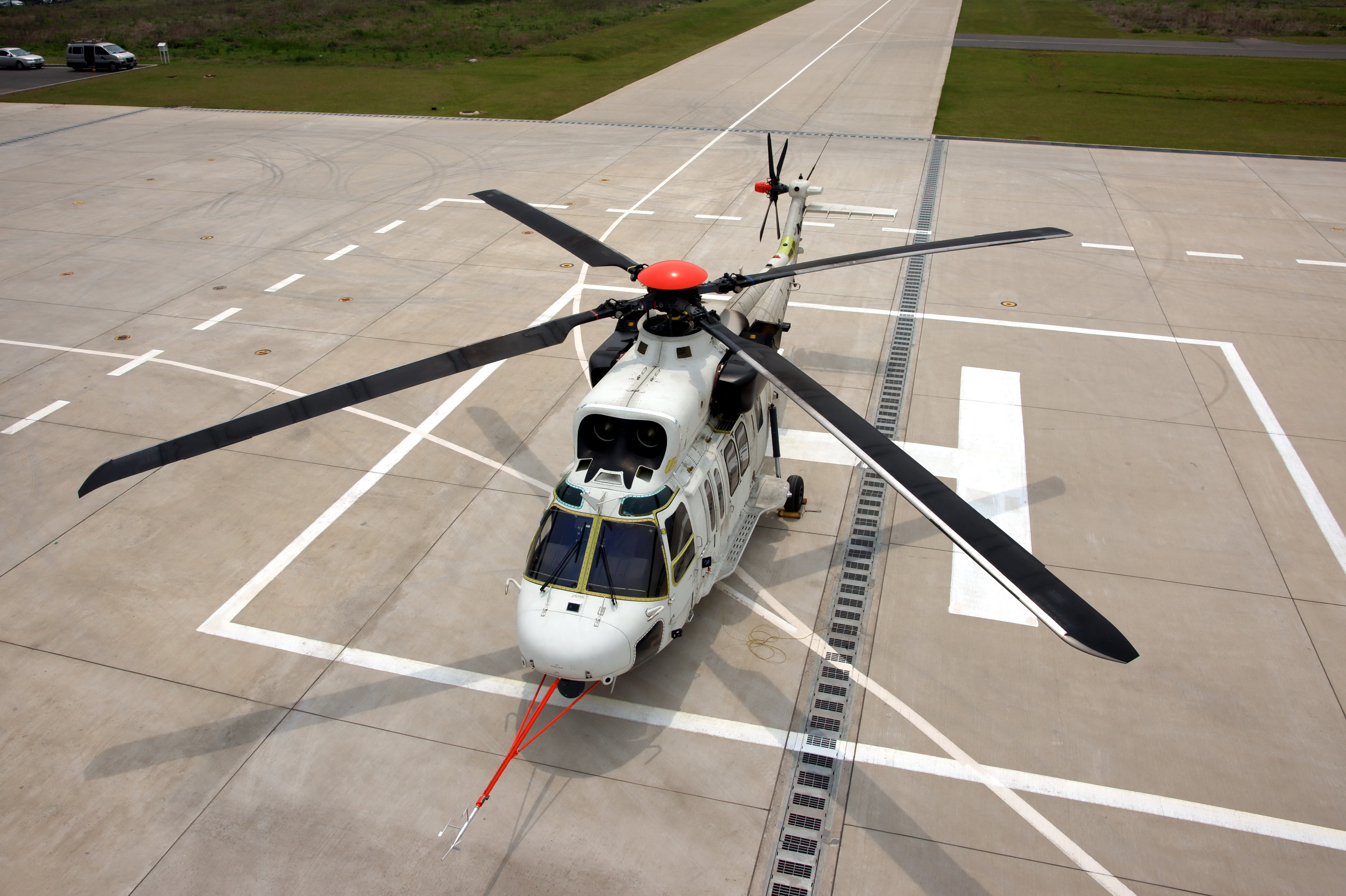
Korean Utility Helicopter Prototype KUH-1 Surion

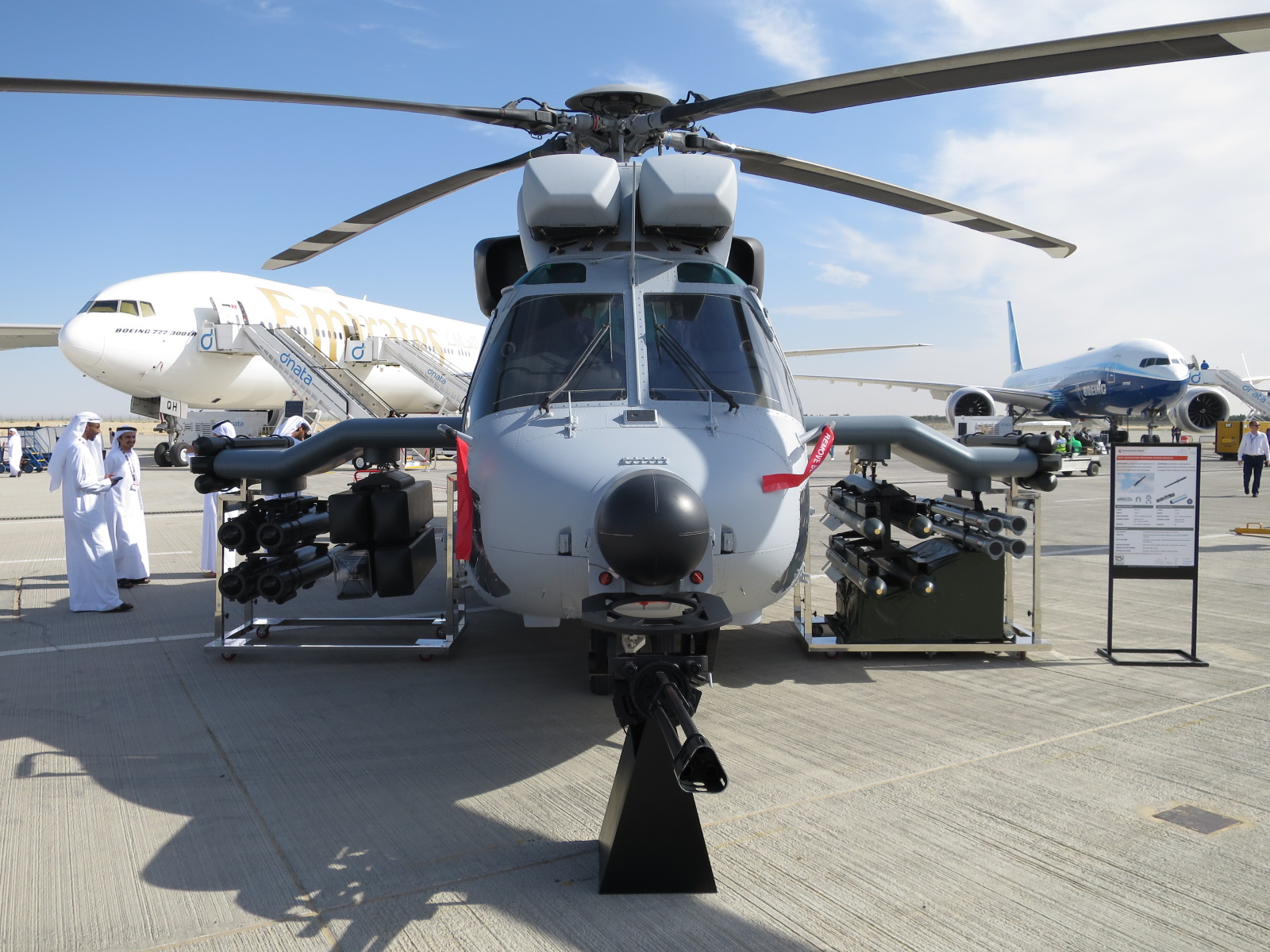
Armed prototype on static display at Dubai Airshow 2023

The KUH-1 Surion served as the basis for a navalised derivative, the Korean Naval Helicopter (KNH). By 2011, the KNH had entered into the development stage; work was being performed on the project by a partnership between KAI, Eurocopter, and Elbit Systems. In January 2016, following completion of development work on the amphibious variant of the Surion, the variant was cleared to enter production later that year.

Specialised models and derivatives of the KUH-1 have been proposed. In October 2009, KAI revealed that it was studying the potential for developing an indigenous attack helicopter based upon the KUH platform as one available option for meeting an established Korean Army requirement for a new attack helicopter (AH-X). This variant was reportedly to possibly share up to 70 per cent component commonality with the base KUH version. In December 2015, the Korea Forest Service and Jeju Fire Safety Headquarters, the largest civil government helicopter operator, ordered a firefighting and EMS version of the KUH-1 Surion; this requires a special airworthiness certificate.

In 2014, DAPA's Board of Audit and Inspection begun an investigation into the level of indigenous technology used on the Surion. The investigation revealed that the technology transfer arrangement with Airbus Helicopters only covered 134 out of the 450 components used in the rotorcraft's power delivery system. Amid allegations of a breach of contract, Airbus Helicopters responded that it had honoured the contractual terms.

In October 2015, KAI announced plans to increase production of the Surion from one helicopter per month to three per month in 2016.

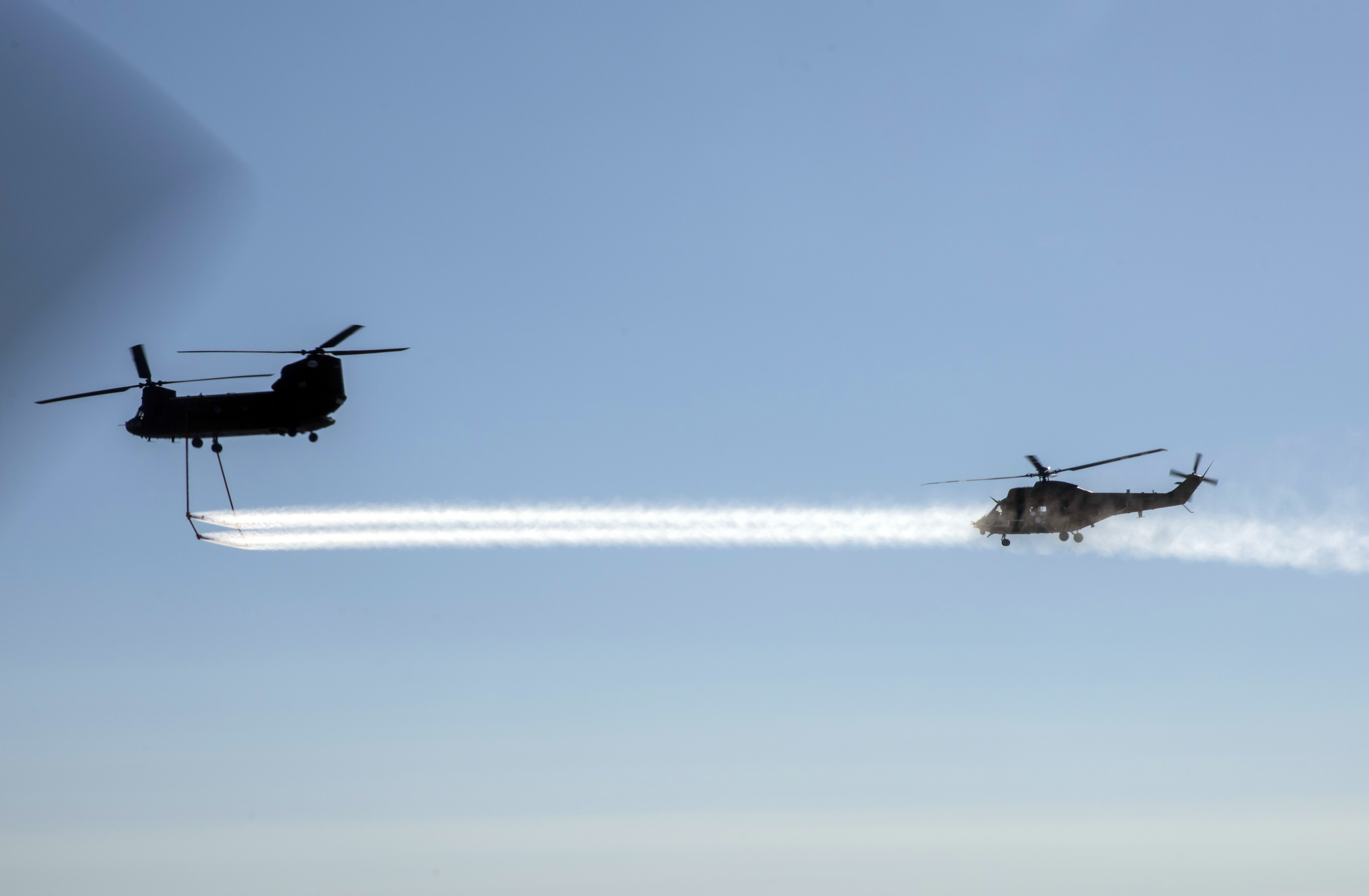
Icing protection testing with HISS

Between 2011 and 2016, the National Aerospace Laboratory of the Netherlands conducted a technology demonstration program under contract from KAI of an experimental fly-by-wire flight control system for the Surion.

In 2018, the Defense Acquisition Program Administration (DAPA) certified KUH-1's ice protection system allowing the helicopter to operate in icing condition. The test activities performed include component-level development and qualification icing wind tunnel testing at Cox & Co in Long Island, NY, icing qualification testing of the engine air intake ice protection system at Rail Tec Arsenal (RTA) in Vienna, Austria, artificial icing flight testing using the US Army Helicopter Icing Spray System (HISS), and natural icing flight testing of the complete aircraft while operating out of K.I.Sawyer Airport near Marquette Michigan, USA from October 2015 to January 2016,.

KAI is offering the Surion to international markets for military and civilian purposes. In late 2013, it was reported that KAI had received requests for proposals regarding the Surion from two South American nations and another Asian nation; at the time, KAI stated that the company hoped to sell 60–120 over the following 15–20 years. International marketing efforts are expected to escalate in 2017, as prior to this point the overwhelming priority had been to fully develop the Surion to conform with existing domestic requirements and roles. KAI has deliberately focused on marketing the type to countries in which previous export success had been found for the KAI T-50 Golden Eagle and KAI KT-1 Woongbi trainer aircraft.

KUH-1 export version prototype helicopter was unveiled at the Seoul ADEX 2019. The new prototype helicopter was developed over four years to meet requirements of foreign customers. This version helicopter is equipped with a GARMIN G5000H avionics suite, and strengthened airframe/structures for the installation of external fuel tanks and a weapons wing pylon. It can accommodate VIPs and passengers with enhanced interior and Bluetooth/wi-fi connectivity.

== Design ==
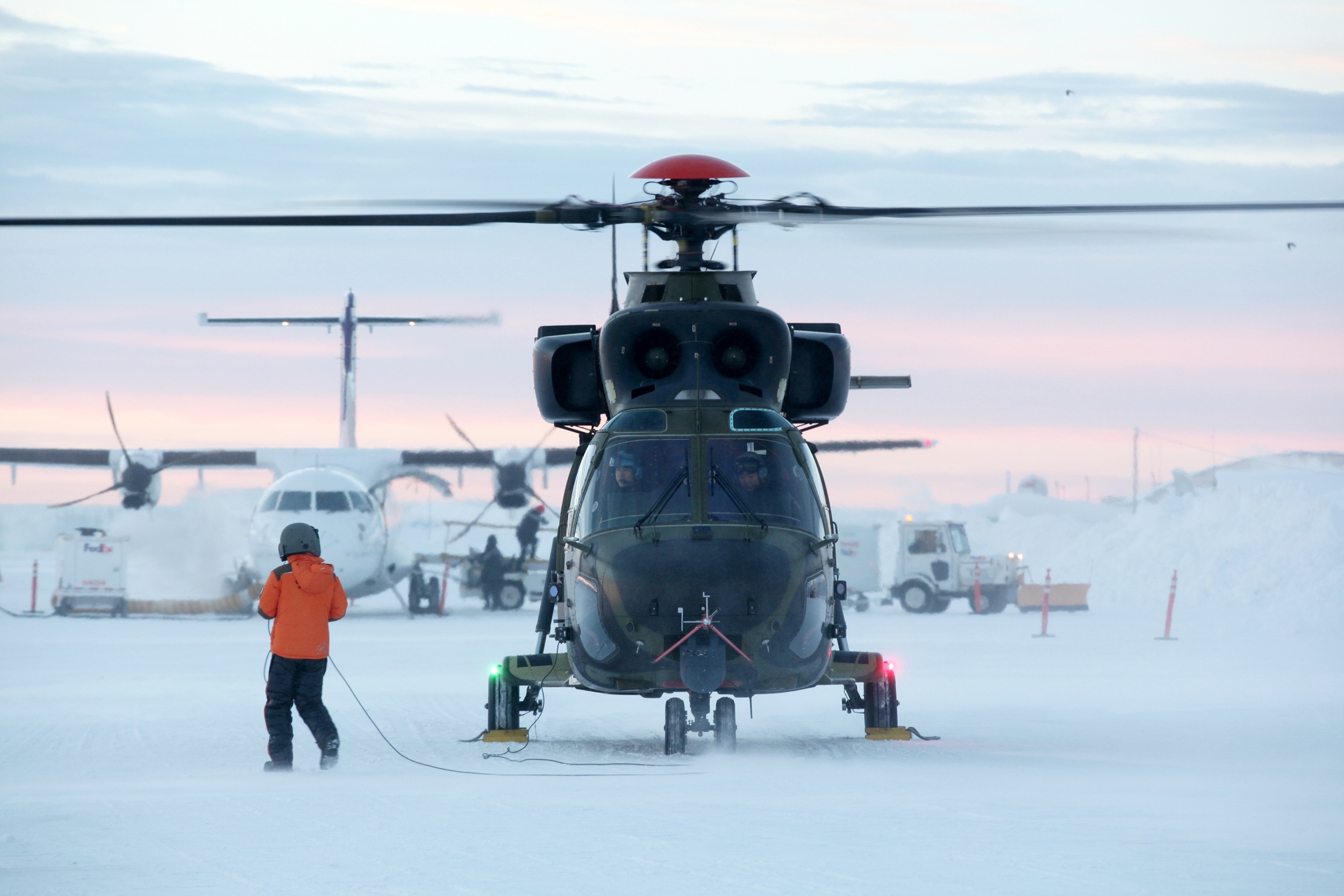
KUH-1 Surion cold weather test in Alaska, 2012

The KAI KUH-1 Surion is a twin-engine medium-sized multipurpose rotorcraft, carrying up to nine troops, with a crew of four, two pilots and two gunners in the main cabin area, in a utility transport capacity. It has been designed to be rapidly reconfigured to serve different roles. Some models are navalised. The Surion can perform various duties and roles, such as military transport, law enforcement, aerial observation, search and rescue, maritime support, aerial firefighting, and for civilian purposes along with other missions.

Power is provided by a pair of 1900shp class Hanwha Techwin T700-701K turboshaft engines, a licence-built localized development of the General Electric T700. The T700/701K, co-developed by General Electric and Hanwha Techwin, is the first rear-drive variant of the T700 engine and features a -701D common core, high-efficiency counter-rotating power turbine, and a new FADEC system. The exhausts of the engines are equipped with large infrared suppressors. These have been adapted from those used on the AS332. Airbus Helicopters manufactures elements of the Surion's transmission. The lower-than-intended level of indigenous production of these components has been a point of controversy.

The Surion is equipped with survivability and damage reduction features. Both the airframe and the cockpit have been made bulletproof against small arms fire. The airframe, tail rotor, and the rotor blades used on both the main and tail rotors are of a crashworthy construction. It has anti-explosion sealed fuel tanks. The main gearbox is capable of flying for a limited period after suffering the loss of lubricating oil. Electronic defensive measures are incorporated onto the Surion, such as a countermeasures dispenser system (CMDS), radar warning receiver (RWR), laser warning receiver (LWR).

British firm Cobham plc provides navigation and communication equipment for the Surion. Sandle Avionic's HeliTAWS multi-hazard avoidance system is installed on Surions in police service. Elbit Systems of Israel produces the helmet mounted display (HMD) used on the Surion, the HMD allows the crew to conduct full day-and-night operations.

== Operational history ==
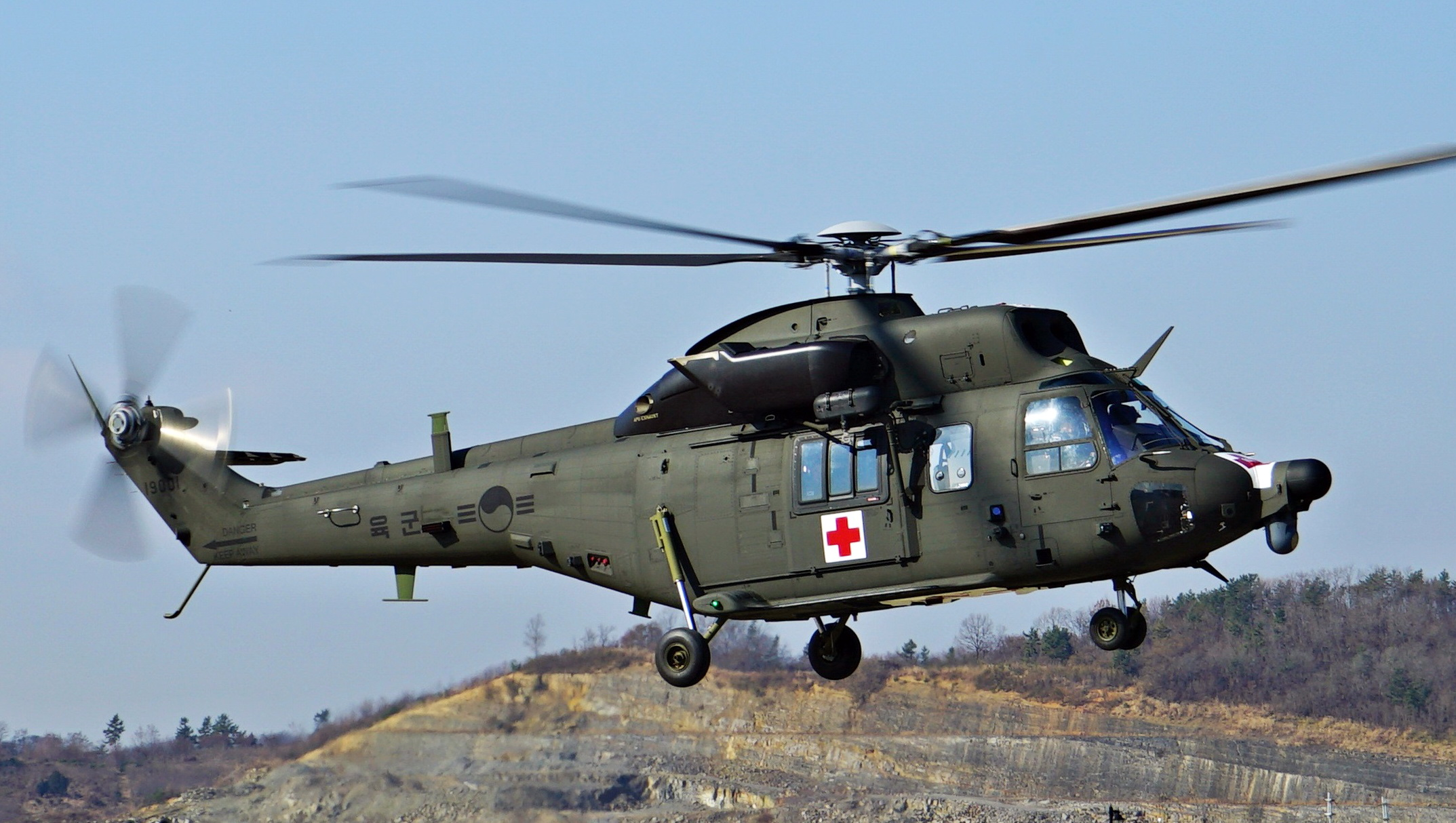
A ROK Army KUH-1M in the medevac role

On 22 May 2013, a handover ceremony of ten Surions was conducted to mark the helicopter's deployment at the Army Aviation School in Nonsan, South Chungcheong Province, attended by President Park Geun-hye.

The KUH-1 performed its first operational mission in August 2015, conducting MEDEVAC in the aftermath of North Korean artillery shells that struck South Korean territory near the Korean Demilitarized Zone. Since entering service, the Surion has reportedly held an availability rate in excess of 80 percent.

In July 2016, the Surion was grounded in response to the CHC Helikopter Service Flight 241. In late 2016, deliveries of the Surion were halted while a resolution for an icing issue that was discovered during winter testing was worked upon. In late 2017, the Surion underwent a repeat of its icing trials to validate this aspect of its performance.

In July 2020, the South Korean Army retired the last of its UH-1H helicopters after 52 years of operation, the type being replaced by the Surion. The Surion may replace South Korea's inventory of 103 UH-60P Black Hawk helicopters. In October 2020, a lawmaker raised concerns that DAPA's decision to retire them in favor of producing 130 additional KUH-1s would cost more than upgrading them, while delivering a helicopter with worse endurance, range, and carrying capacity.

On 4 June 2024, the final Surion was delivered to the ROK Army. Since production began in December 2010 and deliveries started in December 2012, 210 KUH-1s and 8 KUH-1Ms were acquired.

On 17th March 2025, a Surion was completely destroyed in an accident, when a Heron UAV Drone crashed into it while landing.

== Variants ==
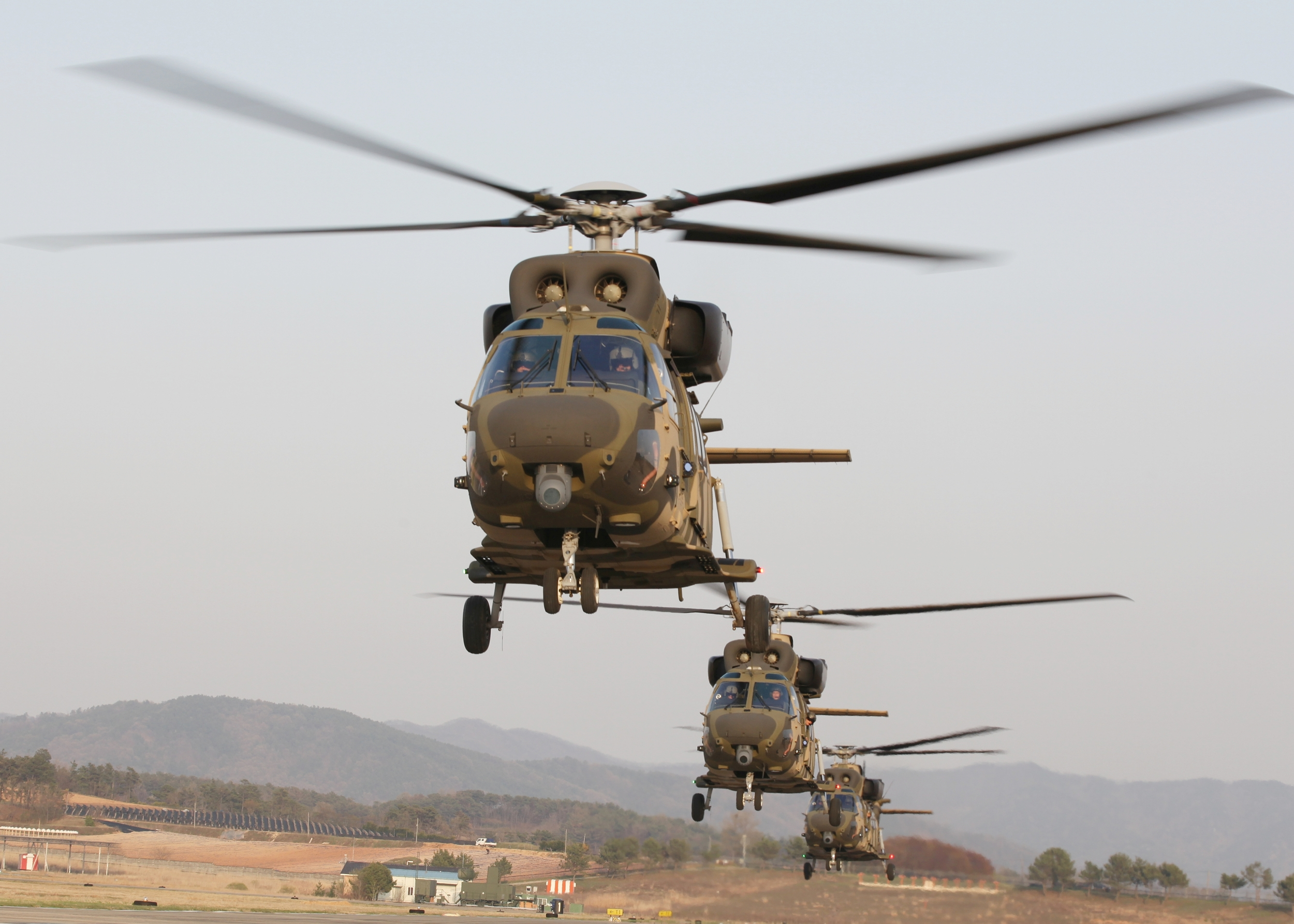
The standard KUH-1 Surion of the South Korean Army

The following variants were planned by KAI, aside from the manufacture of the Surion.

=== KUH-1 Surion (Transport) ===
A basic military utility variant, operated in quantity by the Republic of Korea Army.

=== KUH-1M (MEDEVAC) ===
A medical evacuation variant. It is equipped with a hoist for lifting patients, a weather radar, a detachable auxiliary fuel tank, a traffic collision avoidance system, medical equipment and motorized stretcher system to treat six patients, and additional communications. The first flight occurred in January 2016 and 8 KUH-1M helicopters were delivered to ROKA in 2020.

=== MUH-1 Marineon (Amphibious) ===
A land- and sea-based amphibious variant for the Republic of Korea Marine Corps, it has a 96 percent part commonality with the Surion. Modifications include an integrated flotation system, auxiliary fuel tank, and specialised radio equipment. It has a folding main rotor for use aboard Dokdo-class amphibious assault ships. The Marineon first flew in January 2015. In December 2016, KAI secured a contract to deliver 30 Marineons to the Marine Corps, with the first two delivered in January 2018.
In April 2021, DAPA approved a project to develop an attack version of the Marineon.
In December 2022, KAI was awarded a contract to develop an airborne mine countermeasures (AMCM) system, adapting the Marineon for the role. The equipment will comprise laser mine search equipment, an underwater autonomous mine search vehicle, and an unmanned mine neutralisation system to search, identify, and defuse mines.

=== MAH Marineon (Marine Attack Helicopter) ===
An attack Variant of the MUH-1 Marineon for the Republic of Korea Marine Corps, revealed at ADEX 2021. Comes with stub wings that feature 6 underwing hardpoints for TAIpers, rocket pods and Mistral (missile), and a chin-mounted 20 mm gun turret. First flight was in December 2024. On 28 October 2026, Defense Acquisition Program Administration (DAPA) announced completion of the MAH development. It is 19m long with its rotors turning, 5m tall and a 6.1m width across the stub wings. It has a Maximum Take Off Weight (MTOW) of 8,709 kg.

=== KUH-1 ASW (Anti-Submarine Warfare) ===
A proposed naval variant equipped with torpedoes and anti-ship missiles.

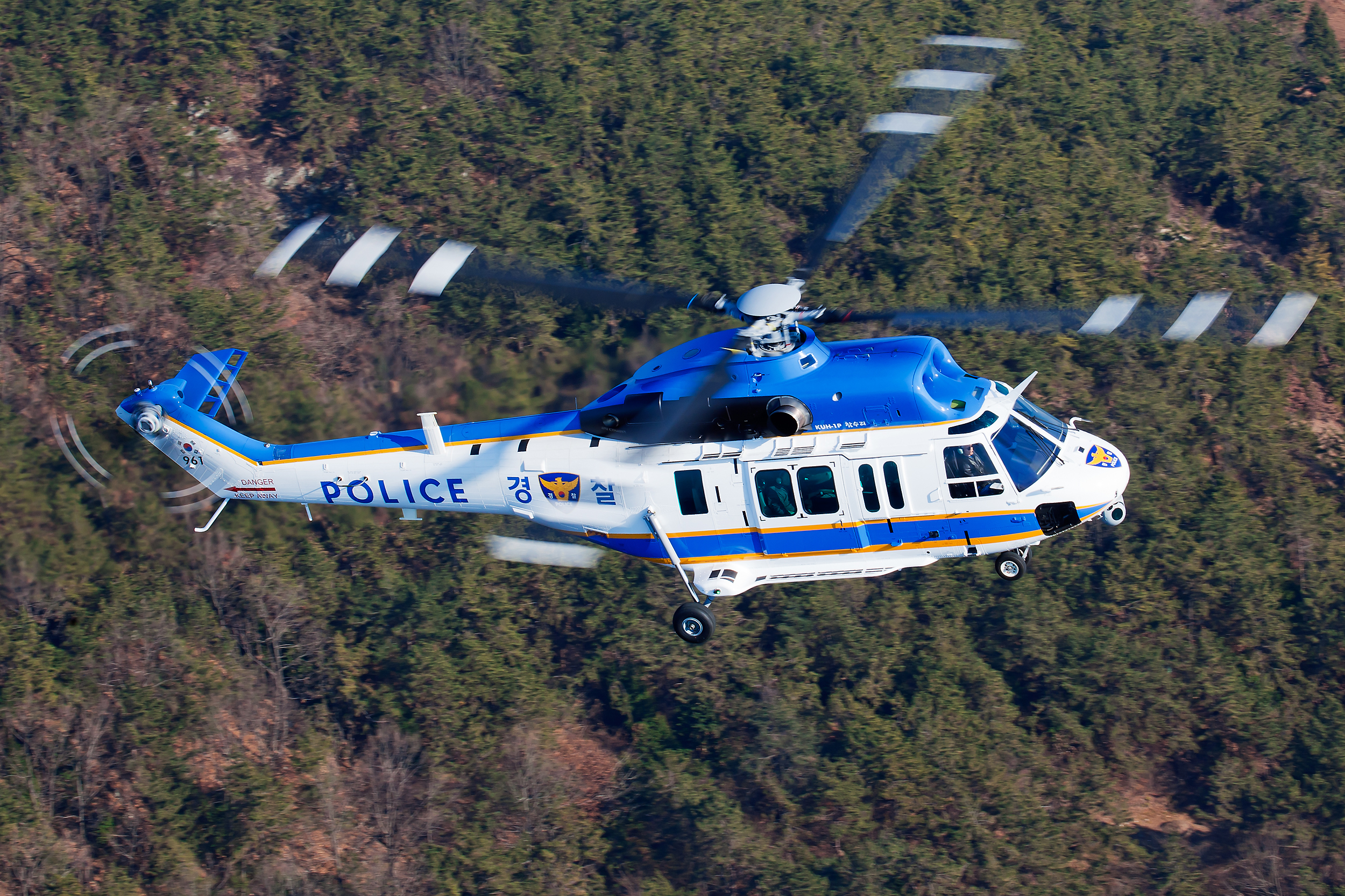
A Korean Police version, KUH-1P Chamsuri

=== KUH-1P Chamsuri (Law Enforcement) ===
A law enforcement variant chosen by the Korean National Police Agency (KNPA) for its Police Helicopter Project. Equipped with a weather radar, traffic collision avoidance system, inertial navigation system, and an external hoist and cameras for rescue duties. Extra electronics are needed compared to ordinary police helicopters for operations near North Korea, which frequently conducts jamming operations. There are 10 KUH-1Ps in service. The KNPA signed a contract for two additional Chamsuri in 2020.

=== KUH-1FS (Forest Service) ===
A firefighting and SAR variant. KAI delivered the first example to Korea Forest Service (KFS) in 2018. The KUH-1FS has capabilities to conduct its main missions, such as prevention and suppression of forest fire and rescue activity upon occurrence of mountain accidents with fire-fighting belly tank system, rescue hoist, cargo hook, HTAWS, and so on.

=== KUH-1EM (Emergency Medical Service & Firefighting) ===
A medical service, firefighting, and SAR variant based on the Surion. It was deployed at Jeju Fire and Safety Headquarters in 2018. The KUH-1EM is equipped EMS kit, stretcher system, belly tank system, weather radar, rescue hoist, air-conditioning system, aux. fuel tank, belly tank, emergency floatation system, etc. to conduct diverse missions. In 2020, the National 119 Rescue Headquarter and Gyeongnam Fire Department placed an order for KHU-1 emergency medical helicopters.

=== KUH-1CG (Coast Guard) ===
A maritime variant operated by the Korea Coast Guard, with advanced mission equipment such as surveillance radar, EO/IR, AIS, SAR-DF, external fuel tanks, air-conditioning system, rescue hoist, emergency floatation, etc. to maintain maritime security and conduct search and rescue. KAI delivered 2 KUH-1 CGs to the Korea Coast Guard in 2019. A second order was made in 2018.

=== KUH-1E (Export) ===
An export version of the Surion that can perform both utility and attack missions. It features stub wings able to mount gun pods, anti-tank and anti-aircraft missiles, and rocket pods. It is fitted with the Garmin G5000H touch-screen glass-integrated avionics system, TACS II traffic collision avoidance system, and a three-dimensional weather radar in the nose.

=== KUHC-1 (Civil) ===
Certified and configured for civil purposes such as emergency patient transfer, fire suppression and search-and-rescue missions. Approved for use by the Korean Ministry of Land, Infrastructure and Transport.

== Operators ==
=== Current operators ===
South Korea

- Republic of Korea Army aviation: 245 KUH-1 Surions on order. 134 in service as of December 2020. Deliveries completed in June 2024.
- Republic of Korea Marine Corps: 30 amphibious variant ordered. 13 Marineon helicopters are in service as of December 2020.
- National Police Agency: 2 KUH-1P aircraft ordered, both delivered by February 2014. In December 2013, KAI received an additional order from National Police Agency. A third was added in late 2015, and a fourth order in 2017. In 2020, additional 2 helicopters are ordered. As of December 2020, 8 police helicopters are in service.
- Korea Forest Service: In December 2015, Korea Aerospace Industries (KAI) was awarded a contract by the Korea Public Procurement Service to provide a variant of KUH Surion helicopter to the Korea Forest Service (KFS). The service's KUH-1FS was delivered in 2017 and fitted with a 528-gal (2,000-l) belly water tank and a rescue hoist.
- Jeju Fire Department: Contract to provide a firefighting helicopter for Jeju Fire Safety Headquarters. The 25-billion-won helicopter will likely be launched in 2015. The KUH-1EM was delivered to Jeju Fire and Safety Department Headquarters in 2018.
- Korea Coast Guard: In 2016, the Korea Coast Guard (KCG) signed a deal with Korea Aerospace Industries for 2 helicopters. The helicopters were delivered in 2019. The KCG ordered an additional helicopter, to be delivered in 2021.
- Korea Aerospace Industries (KAI): The company itself operates four prototype units and one export version helicopter.

=== Potential customers ===
- Vietnam: In mid-2023, Korea Aerospace Industries (KAI) signed a Memorandum of Understanding with Viettel Aerospace Institute (VTX) to "cooperate in developing and producing helicopters". By that, KAI and VTX plan to collaborate on the development and production of helicopter's rotary wings. The agreement is expected to boost KAI's presence in the Southeast Asian helicopter market while eventually making Vietnam a very potential customer of the Surion. The then-Vietnamese President Võ Văn Thưởng has revealed to the President of South Korea Yoon Suk Yeol that he would encourage negotiations with Korean firms to find replacements for Vietnam's aging helicopters, while KAI and VTX will together "explore the Vietnamese helicopter market" alongside the mentioned technology cooperation.
- Iraq: In August 2024, Korean media reported that a high-ranking Iraqi Army official, Lieutenant General Samir Zaki Hussein Al-Maliki, commander of Iraq’s Army Aviation Command, embarked on a four-day visit to South Korea. [The] official’s visit to South Korea coincides with Iraq’s exploration of potential acquisitions to modernize its military assets. While Iraq previously secured a deal with KAI for the procurement of 24 FA-50 light attack aircraft in 2013, discussions regarding the Surion helicopter mark a new avenue for collaboration between the two nations. In December 2024, the KAI signed a US$93.7 million deal to export the aircraft to Iraq. Under the deal, KAI will supply 2 KUH-1 helicopters to the Iraqi government by March 2029.

=== Failed bids ===
- Philippines: In January 2019, it was reported that attempts to sell the Surion to the Philippines did not materialize. The Sikorsky UH-60 Black Hawk was selected by the Philippine Air Force instead.

== Accidents and incidents ==
- In July 2018, a MUH-1 Marineon crashed at Pohang Airport, South Korea killing 5 crewmembers and injuring another one. The helicopter was on a maintenance test flight when it went down at a height of 10m and caught fire. A committee was formed to determine the exact cause of the crash, however the mechanical failure is obvious as the main rotor had separated from the aircraft during take-off. On 21 December 2018, the final report from a Joint investigation into a fatal crash of Marineon helicopter determined that the defective rotor mast was first caused during the forging process. The faulty rotor mast was supplied by Airbus Helicopters, but manufactured by Airbus Helicopters contractor, Aubert & Duval S.A. As a follow-up measure, the French government has agreed to guarantee the quality of key helicopter parts including rotor mast produced by Airbus to South Korea for the KUH-1 helicopter.

== Specifications (KUH-1) ==
Data from KAI

General characteristics

- Crew: 2 pilots
- Capacity: 13 passengers (including 9 troops - KUH-1) - up to 18 passengers with the KUH-1E variant
- Length: 19 m (62 ft 4 in) including rotors
- Width: 3.3 m (10 ft 10 in) (fuselage)
- Height: 5 m (16 ft 5 in) with tail rotor
- Max takeoff weight: 8,709 kg (19,200 lb)
- Useful lift: 2,700 kg (6,000 lb) of external load
- Powerplant: 2 × General Electric / Hanwha Aerospace T700-701K turboshaft, 1,383 kW (1,855 shp) each with dual-channel FADEC

Performance

- Maximum speed: 270–283 km/h (168–176 mph, 146–153 kn)
- Range: 828 km (514 mi, 447 nmi) with auxiliary fuel tank
- Service ceiling: 4,595 m (15,075 ft)
- Hovering ceiling: 2,717 m (8,915 ft)

Armament

- Guns: A couple of 7.62mm pintle-mounted machine gun pods
  Removable pylons or hardpoints for heavier gun pods, air-launched rockets, and/or anti-tank guided missiles

== Family tree ==
  - SA330 Puma – (France)
    - Atlas Oryx – (South Africa)
      - Denel Rooivalk – (South Africa)
    - IAR 330 – (Romania)
    - IPTN NAS 330J (Indonesia)
    - Westland Puma HC.1 (United Kingdom)
  - Eurocopter AS332 Super Puma – (France) (H215 Super Puma)
    - Eurocopter AS532 Cougar – (France) (H215M Caracal)
    - KAI KUH-1 Surion – (South Korea)
  - Eurocopter EC725 – (France) (H225M Caracal)
    - Eurocopter EC225 Super Puma – (France) (EC225 Super Puma Mk2)

== See also ==
External videos
- KUH-1 Surion performing an aerobatic display
- News report in 2013 on the introduction of the Surion
- Promotional video of the Surion

Related development

- Eurocopter AS332 Super Puma

Aircraft of comparable role, configuration, and era

- AgustaWestland AW149
- AgustaWestland AW189
- Airbus Helicopters H175
- Bell 525 Relentless
- NHIndustries NH90
- Mil Mi-8/Mil Mi-17
- Sikorsky UH-60 Black Hawk
- Sikorsky S-92
- Harbin Z-20

Related lists

- List of rotorcraft
- List of utility helicopters
