= Royal Thai Army Aviation Center =

Royal Thai Army administrative organization

Army Aviation Center
- ศูนย์การบินทหารบก
- Symbol of Army Aviation
- Founded: 25 June 1935
- Country: Thailand
- Branch: Royal Thai Army
- Type: Army aviation
- Garrison/HQ: Fort Princess Srinagarindra, Mueang Lopburi, Lopburi
- Website: aavnc.rta.mi.th

Insignia
- Aircraft symbol

Aircraft flown
- Attack helicopter: Bell AH-1F Huey Cobra; Boeing AH-6; Eurocopter Fennec AS550 C3
- Cargo helicopter: CH-47; Mil Mi-17-V5
- Multirole helicopter: AgustaWestland AW149; Bell UH-1H Iroquois; Eurocopter UH-72A Lakota
- Trainer helicopter: Enstrom 480,
- Utility helicopter: UH-60; Bell UH-1H Iroquois; Eurocopter UH-72A Lakota

The Royal Thai Army Aviation Center (AAVNC; Thai: ศูนย์การบินทหารบก) is the aviation component of the Royal Thai Army and structurally an administrative organization in its service branch responsible for

- Conduct research and develop to define doctrines and make textbooks in science.
- Configuration of all army aviation units.
- General support flight operations per military unit, both administrative missions and send maintenance and other missions as assigned.
- Military operations.
- Produce, training, and control personnel who aircraft mechanics, crewmen, pirots, and workers about army aviation.
- Provide advice and technical advice on Army Aviation affairs to relevant units and branches of technology.
- Recommend, suggest, supervise the Royal Thai Army's aviation safety aviation affairs.
- Search and rescue assistance for disaster victims to support government agencies and other organizations in disaster relief.
- Study, research, and develop as well as collect statistics about Army Aviation Affairs.

It is based at Fort Princess Srinagarindra, in Mueang Lopburi District.

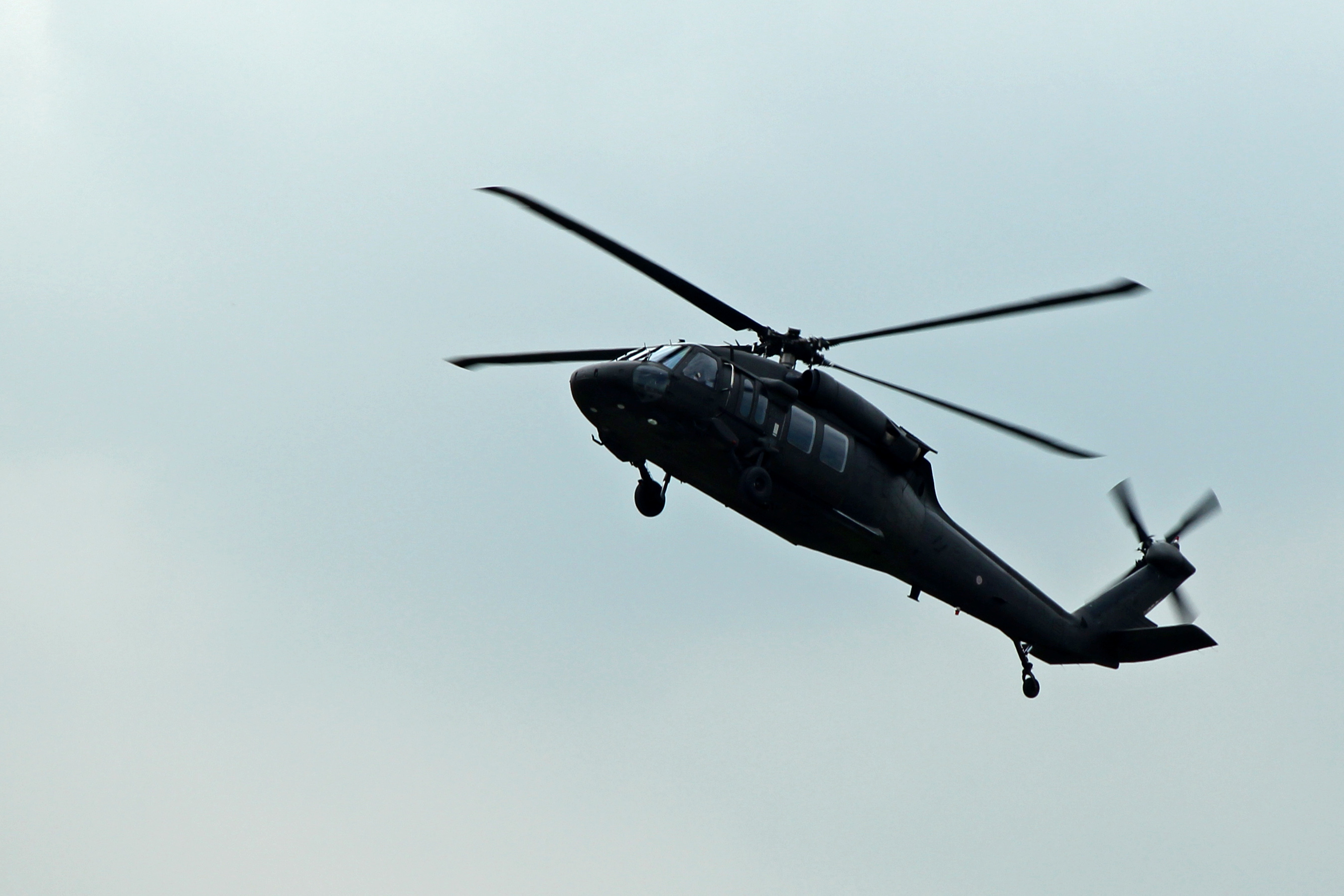
UH-60L Black Hawk during air show at Don Mueang Air Force Base

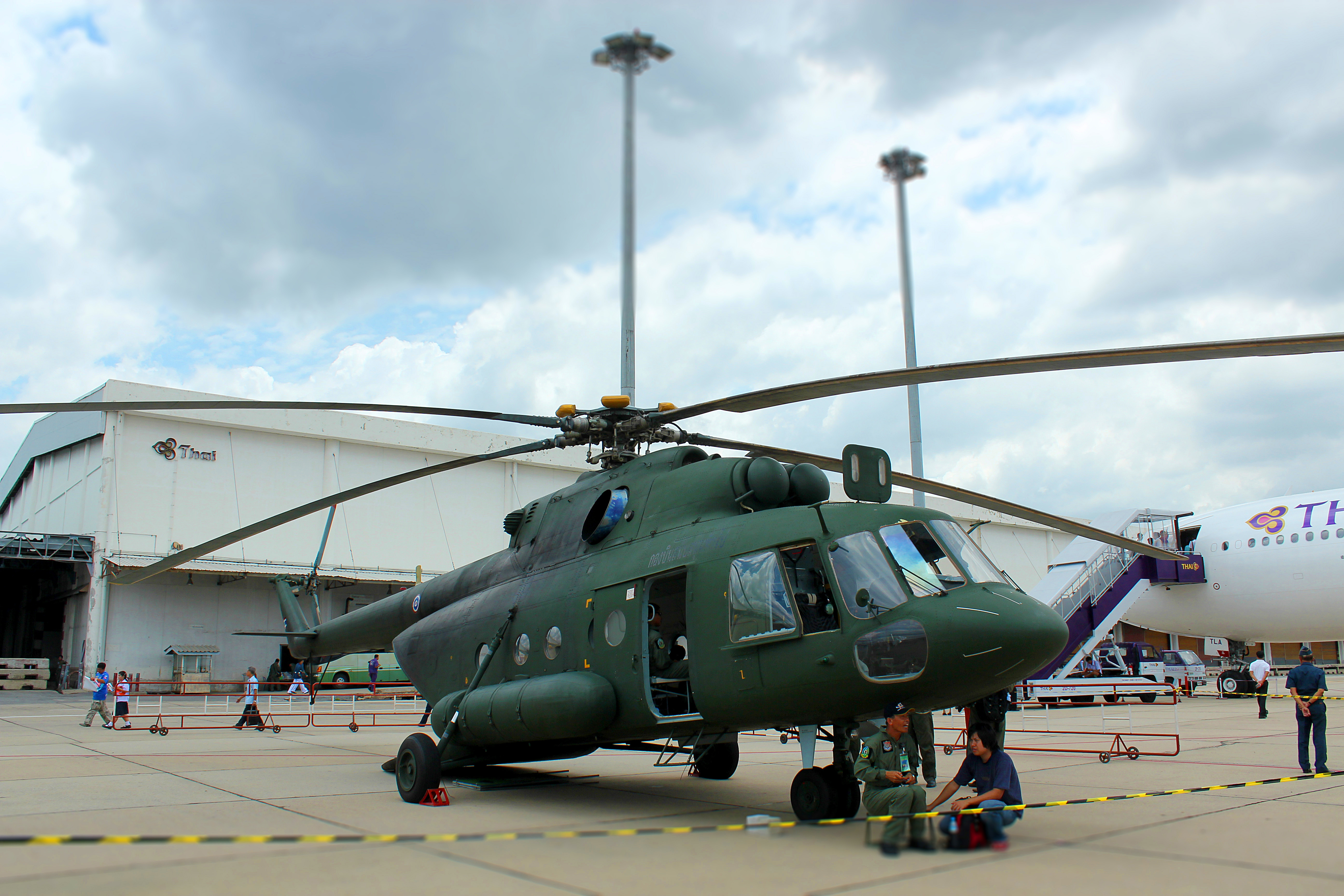
Mil Mi-17 V5 during air show at Don Mueang Air Force Base

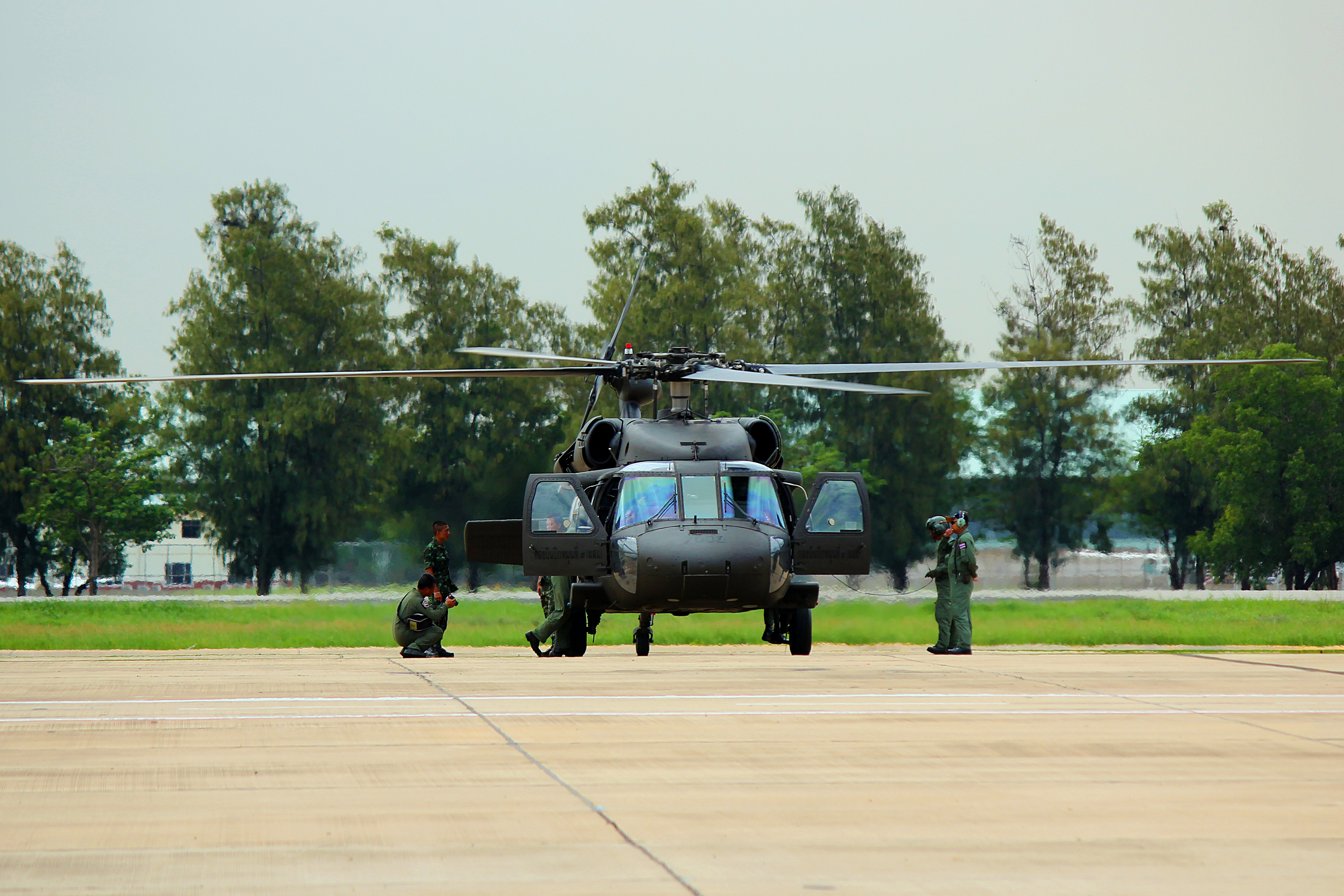
UH-60L Black Hawk during air show at Don Mueang Air Force Base

== History ==
Thai military aviation began in 1911 when three Siamese army officers were sent to France to learn to pilot aircraft. They returned to Siam in 1913 with four Nieuport monoplanes and four Breguet biplanes. An aerodrome constructed at Don Mueang and the army aviation units moved there on 17 March 1914. On 27 March 1914 the unit became the Army Air Corps. Since then, 27 March has been observed as the birthday of the Royal Thai Air Force.

In 1918, the Army Air Corps gained the status of a division consisting of three wings. It remained under the army until December 1921 when it was renamed the Air Division and was placed directly under the Ministry of War. The Air Division's name changed again in 1935 to the Air Force Division. In 1937 it was proclaimed the Royal Thai Air Force. In 1967 the Army Aviation School was founded, and the Army Aviation Center was created on 20 September 1977.

== Mission ==
- Planning, directing, and practicing And study about Operation of the Royal Thai Army.
- Conduct research Develop, define principles and make texts in science associated.
- Ruling the military units that the Ministry of Defense requires The commander of the Army Aviation Center is responsible for.

== Organization ==
- Royal Thai Army Aviation Center Headquarters
  - Aviation Regiment
    - 1st Aviation Battalion
    - 2nd Aviation Battalion
    - 3rd Aviation Battalion
    - 9th Aviation Battalion
    - 21st Aviation Battalion
    - 41st Aviation Battalion
  - Science Division
  - Service Division
  - Airport Division
  - Aviation Communications Division
  - Aviation Safety Division
  - Disease examination unit
  - Army Aviation School
  - Department of Aviation
  - Airbase Defense Battalion
  - Aviation Communication Support Division

=== Aircraft ===
The Royal Thai Army is known to operate the following aircraft types:

| Photo | Model | Type | Origin | Quantity | Notes |
Helicopters
| | Bell AH-1F Huey Cobra | Attack helicopter | US | 7 | Will be replaced by Boeing AH-6. Four were ordered in 1988 and another four were ordered in 2005. One was lost in 2001 crash. Three in storage for spare parts. |
| | Boeing AH-6 | Light Attack helicopter | US | 0+(8) | 8 on order. |
| | Eurocopter Fennec AS550 C3 | Light Attack helicopter | France | 8 | |
| | Sikorsky UH-60L/M/A Blackhawk | Utility helicopter | US | 18 | 8 UH-60L, 7 UH-60M, 3 UH-60A |
| | Bell 212 | Utility helicopter | US | 48 | 48 units undergoing upgrade to tactical helicopter. |
| | Eurocopter UH-72A Lakota | Utility helicopter | US | 5 | One lost in 2016 crash. |
| | Eurocopter EC145 | VIP transport/Utility helicopter | Germany | 6 | |
| | AgustaWestland AW139 | VIP transport/Utility helicopter | Italy | 10 | Used for VIPs. |
| | AgustaWestland AW149 | VIP transport/Utility helicopter | Italy | 5 | |
| | Mil Mi-17-V5 | Transport helicopter | Russia | 10 | 2 on order. |
| | Kamov Ka-32A1 | Utility helicopter | Russia | 4 | Ka-32A11BC. Fire fighting helicopter flown for Department of Disaster Prevention and Mitigation. |
| | Bell 206 Jet Ranger | Utility helicopter | US | 20 | Both the Bell 206A and Bell 206B are in use. |
| | Schweizer S-300C | Observation/Trainer helicopter | US | 45 | For observation and training |
| | Enstrom 480B | Trainer helicopter | US | 21 | For training one crash in 2021 |
| | Robinson R44 | Trainer helicopter | US | 1 | For training |
Fixed-wing aircraft
| | CASA C-295W | Transport aircraft | Spain | 3 | |
| | CASA C-212-300 Aviocar | transport aircraft | Spain | 2 | Serial numbers 446 and 447 based with the VIP squadron at Don Mueang Airport. |
| | Embraer ERJ-135LR | VIP transport aircraft | Brazil | 2 | Both aircraft delivered (serial numbers 1084/HS-AMP and 1124) |
| | British Aerospace Jetstream 41 | VIP transport aircraft | UK | 2 | Serial numbers 41060 and 41094. Based with the VIP unit at Don Mueang Airport. |
| | Beechcraft 1900C-1 | VIP transport aircraft | US | 2 | Serial numbers 0169 and 0170. Based with the VIP unit at Don Mueang Airport. |
| | Beechcraft Super King Air 200 | VIP transport aircraft | US | 2 | Serial numbers 0342 and 1165. Based at the Lopburi army complex. |
| | Pilatus PC-12 NGX | VIP transport aircraft | Switzerland | 1 | Serial number 2307. Based with the VIP unit at Don Mueang Airport. As a replacement for the Beechcraft 1900. |
Unmanned aerial vehicles
| | Elbit Hermes 450 | UAV | Israel | 4 | The UAVs are operated by the 21st Aviation Battalion at the Army Aviation Centre at Lopburi. |
| | IAI Searcher | UAV | Israel | 4 | |
| | AeroVironment RQ-11 Raven | UAV | US | Unknown | |
