= Army aviation =

Aviation-related unit of a nation's army

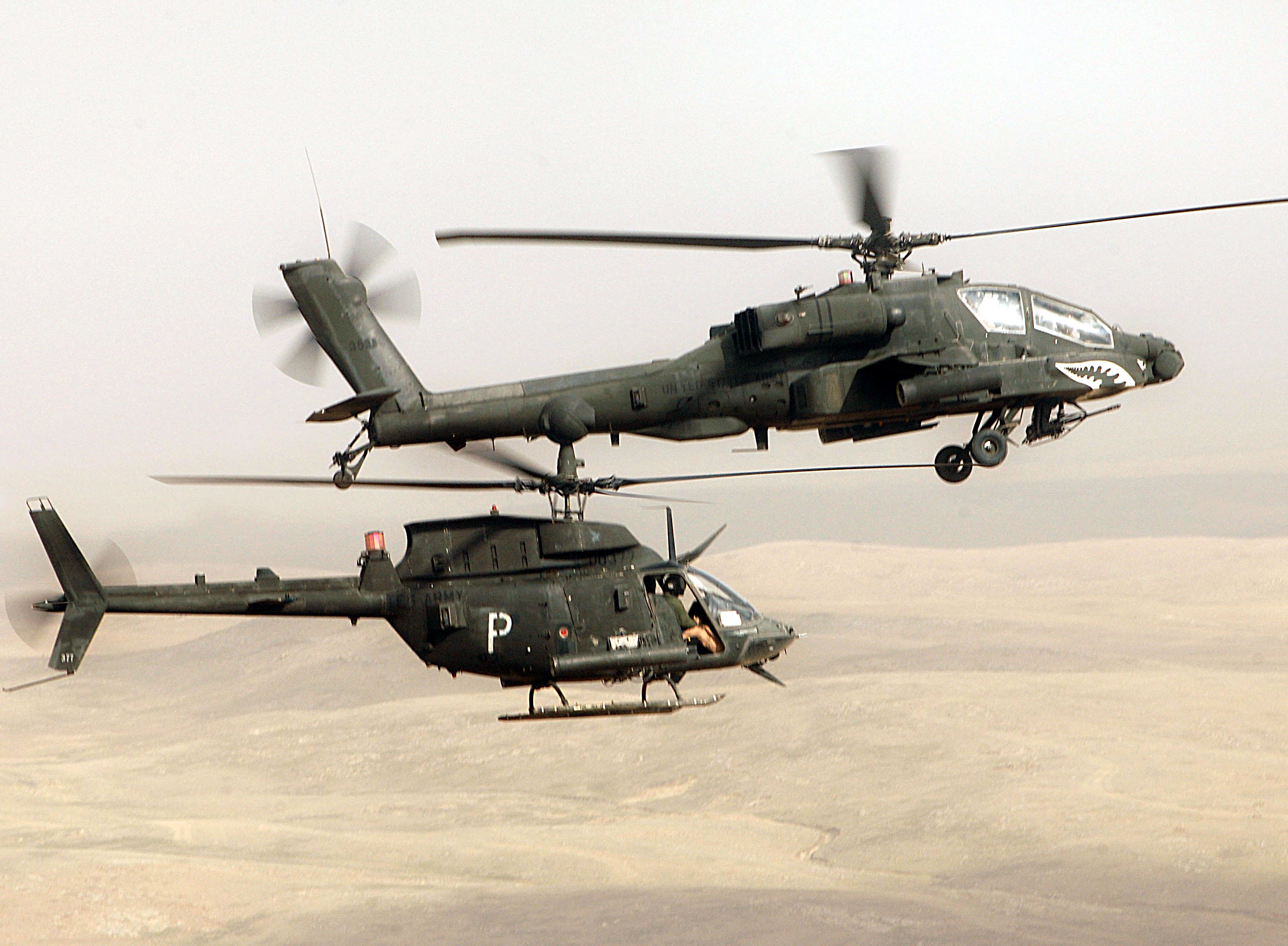
U.S. soldiers in OH-58D Kiowa and AH-64 Apache helicopters conduct a combat air patrol in Iraq

Army aviation is military aviation that is organized as a sub-branch under the command of an army, separate from a nation's dedicated air force. Army aviation units, sometimes described as air corps, are typically attached as a part of to a ground force and tasked to tactically assist its land warfare by providing close air support, rapid insertion, reconnaissance and logistics for front line ground operations. They usually comprise VTOL aircraft such as military helicopters, as well as gyrocopters, light fixed-wing attack aircraft and unmanned aerial vehicles (drones), and historically also aerostats such as military balloons and airships.

Prior to the establishment of separate national air forces, many armies had aviation units, which as the importance of aviation increased, were spun off into independent branches of the military. As the separation between a nation's ground and air forces led to a divergence of priorities, many armies sought to re-establish their own aviation branches to best serve their own organic tactical needs.

== History ==
Military aviation first began as either army or naval aviation units established as force multipliers to allow armies and navies to better do what they were already doing, this taking mostly the form of reconnaissance and artillery spotting, this led to the first fighter aircraft whose purpose was to shoot down enemy reconnaissance and artillery spotting aircraft, and to protect one's own aircraft from being shot down. At this point the purpose of aircraft was still to act as an adjunct to traditional armies and fleets operating in the traditional way. However, as aircraft became more technologically sophisticated military theorists of the interwar period began to think of airpower as a means in and of itself where the critical blow could be delivered by strategic bombing, and the experience of World War II confirmed this. Post World War II air forces such as the Royal Air Force and the newly established United States Air Force concentrated on building strategic bomber forces for attack and fighter forces to defend against enemy bombers. Air forces still incorporated a significant amount of tactical missions through air interdiction and close air support missions.

In order to acquire a close air support capability armies sought to expand, establish or re-establish their own tactical aviation branches, which are usually composed of helicopters, rather than fixed-wing aircraft.

With the development of unmanned aerial vehicles some armies have begun to use small battlefield UAVs, not attached to army aviation units, but rather directly attached to artillery battalions as spotters, and with the smallest and lightest drones being deployed by individual infantry platoons to provide real time local reconnaissance.

== Tasks ==
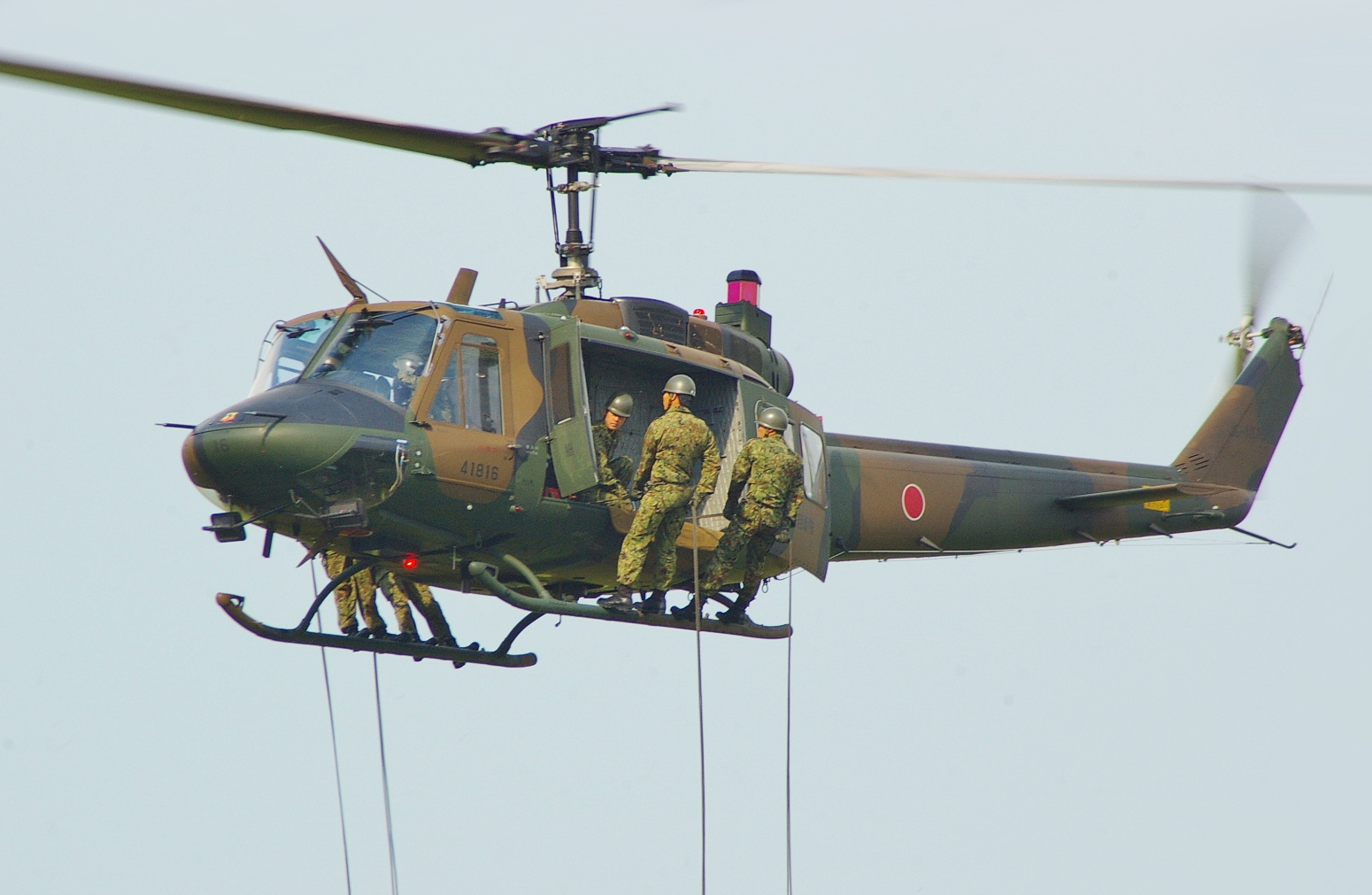
Soldiers rappelling from a JGSDF UH-1J

The tasks of each army's aviation units are defined slightly different, depending on country. Some general characteristics include:

- Tactical offensive action (anti-tank warfare, air assault, and close air support)
- ISTAR (Intelligence, Surveillance, Target acquisition, Reconnaissance)
- Logistic and battlefield support
- Tactical transport both internally and externally, of personnel and material
- Search and rescue
- Medical evacuation
- Liaison
- Disaster relief

== Equipment ==
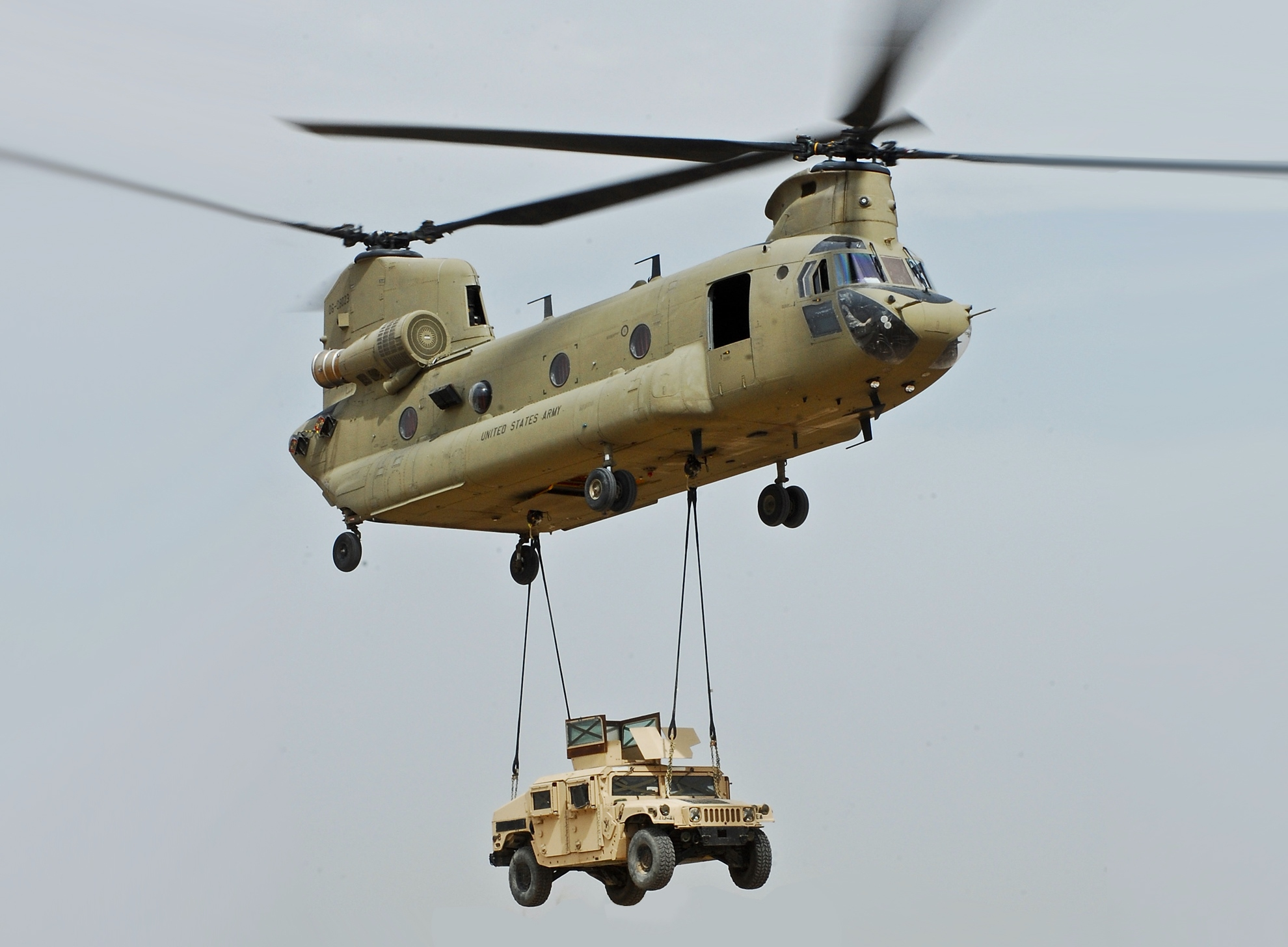
A US Army CH-47 Chinook sling loads a Humvee

In order to fulfill their manifold tasks, army aviation mostly uses helicopters. These helicopters can be classified into the following categories:

- Attack helicopters for close air support of ground troops and anti-tank role
- Transport helicopters
- Observation helicopters
- Utility helicopters
- Combat Search and Rescue (CSAR), Casualty evacuation (CASEVAC) / Medical evacuation (MEDEVAC) helicopters
- Training helicopters

In addition to helicopters, some armies also operate fixed-wing aircraft for transport, command and control and tactical reconnaissance.

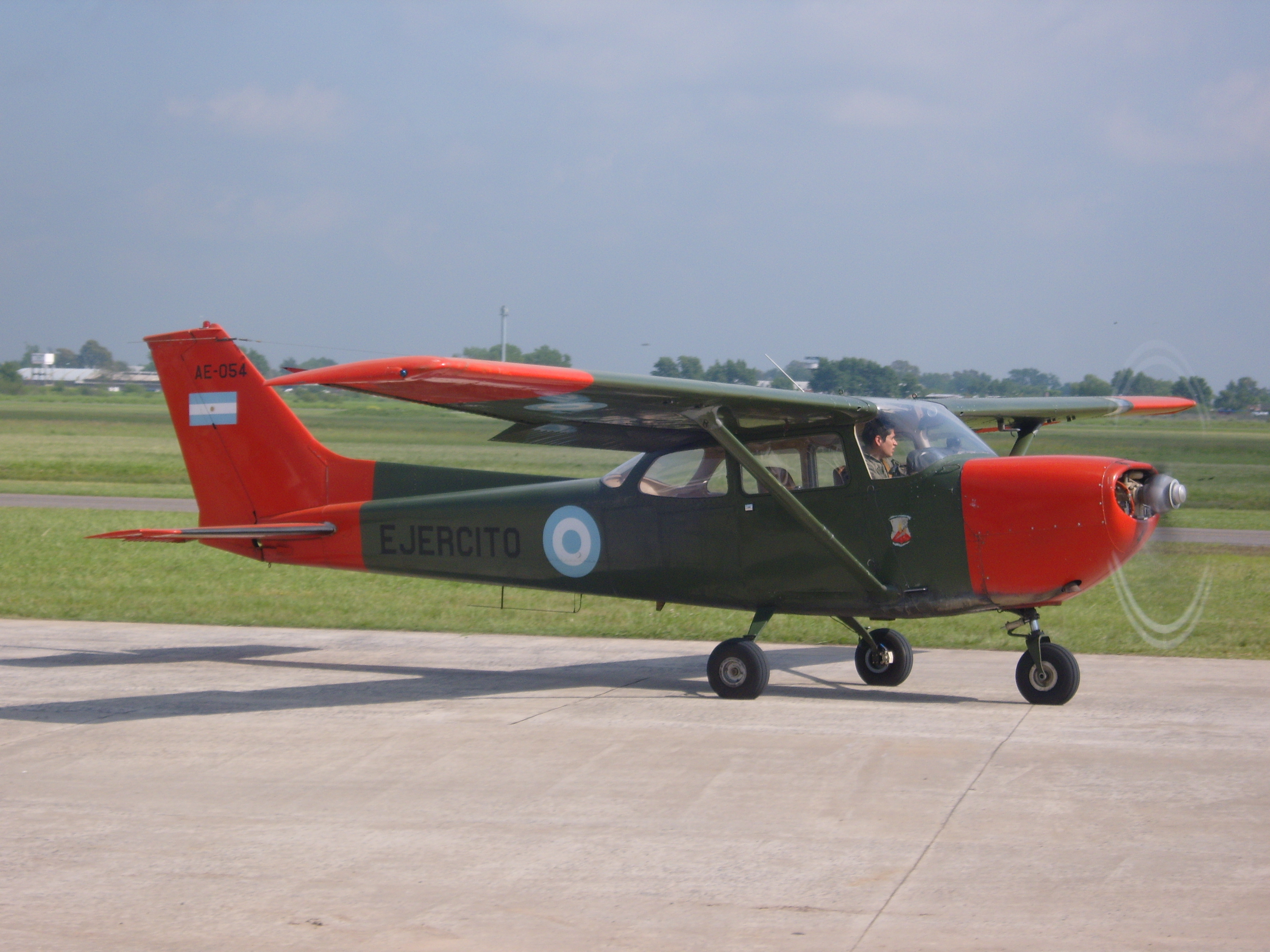
An Argentine Army Cessna T-41D trainer aircraft, in 2009.

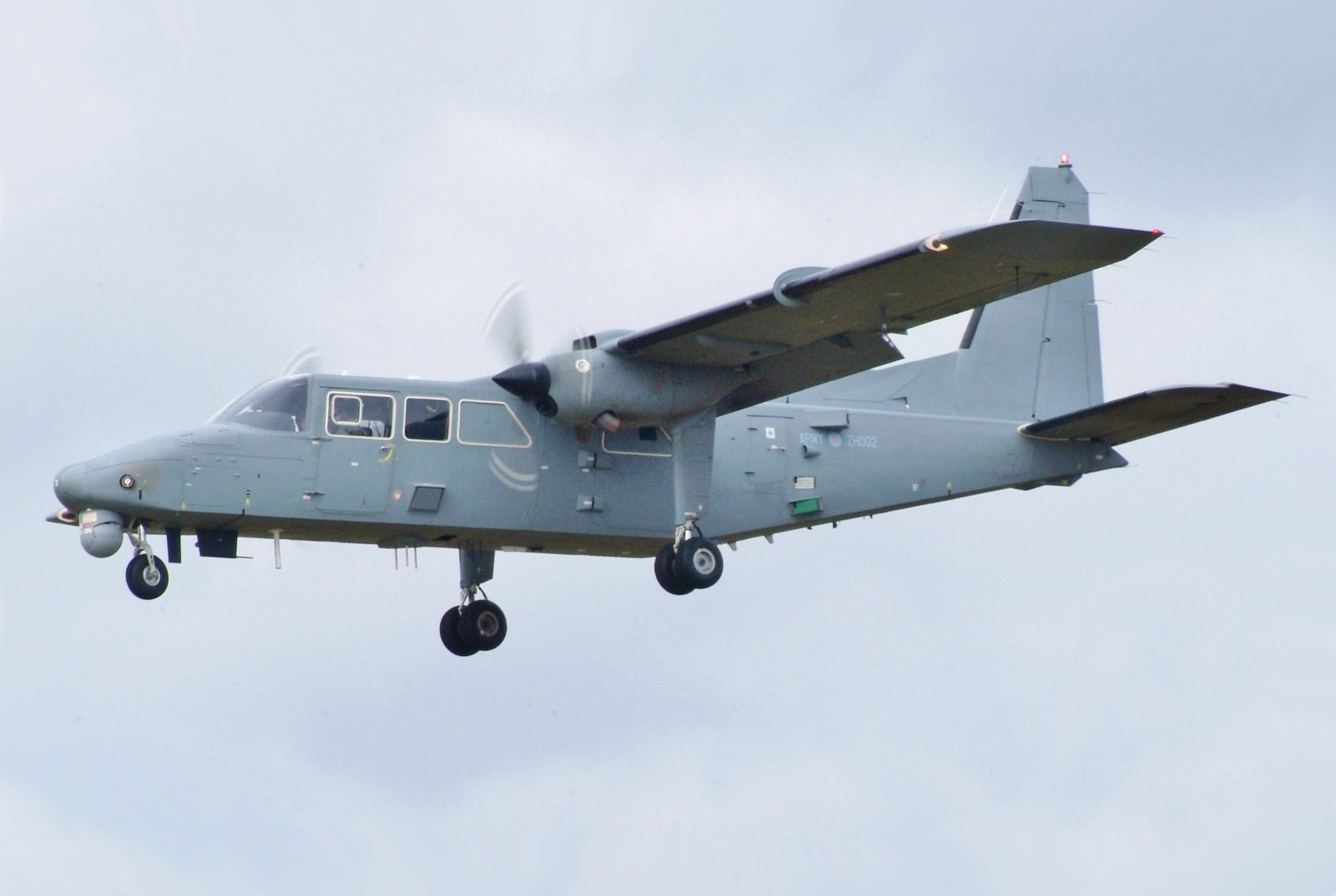
A British Army Air Corps Defender.

== List of army aviation units ==
- Argentine Army Aviation (Argentine Army)
- Australian Army Aviation (Australian Army)
- Army Air Corps (United Kingdom) (British Army)
- Bangladesh Army Aviation Group (Bangladesh Army)
- Brazilian Army Aviation (Brazilian Army)
- Colombian National Army Aviation (Colombian Army)
- French Army Light Aviation (French Army)
- German Army Aviation Corps (German Army)
- Hellenic Army Aviation (Hellenic Army)
- Army Aviation Corps (India)
- Indonesian Army Aviation (Indonesian Army)
- Islamic Republic of Iran Army Aviation (Islamic Republic of Iran Army)
- Iraqi Army Aviation Command (Iraqi Army)
- Malaysian Army Aviation (Malaysian Army)
- Nepalese Army Air Service (Nepali Army)
- Pakistan Army Aviation Corps (Pakistan Army)
- Portuguese Army Light Aviation Unit (Portuguese Army)
- Spanish Army Airmobile Force (Spanish Army)
- Republic of Korea Army aviation (Republic of Korea Army)
- Royal Thai Army Aviation Center (Royal Thai Army)
- Turkish Army Aviation Command (Turkish Army)
- Ukrainian Army Aviation (Ukrainian Ground Forces)
- United States Army Aviation Branch (U.S. Army)

== See also ==
- ru:Армейская_авиация_Российской_Федерации - Army Aviation of the Russian Federation
- Army Aviation School
- Naval aviation
