= Neuhausen ob Eck Airfield =

German civil aerodrome in Neuhausen ob Eck

Neuhausen ob Eck Airfield Flugplatz Neuhausen ob Eck
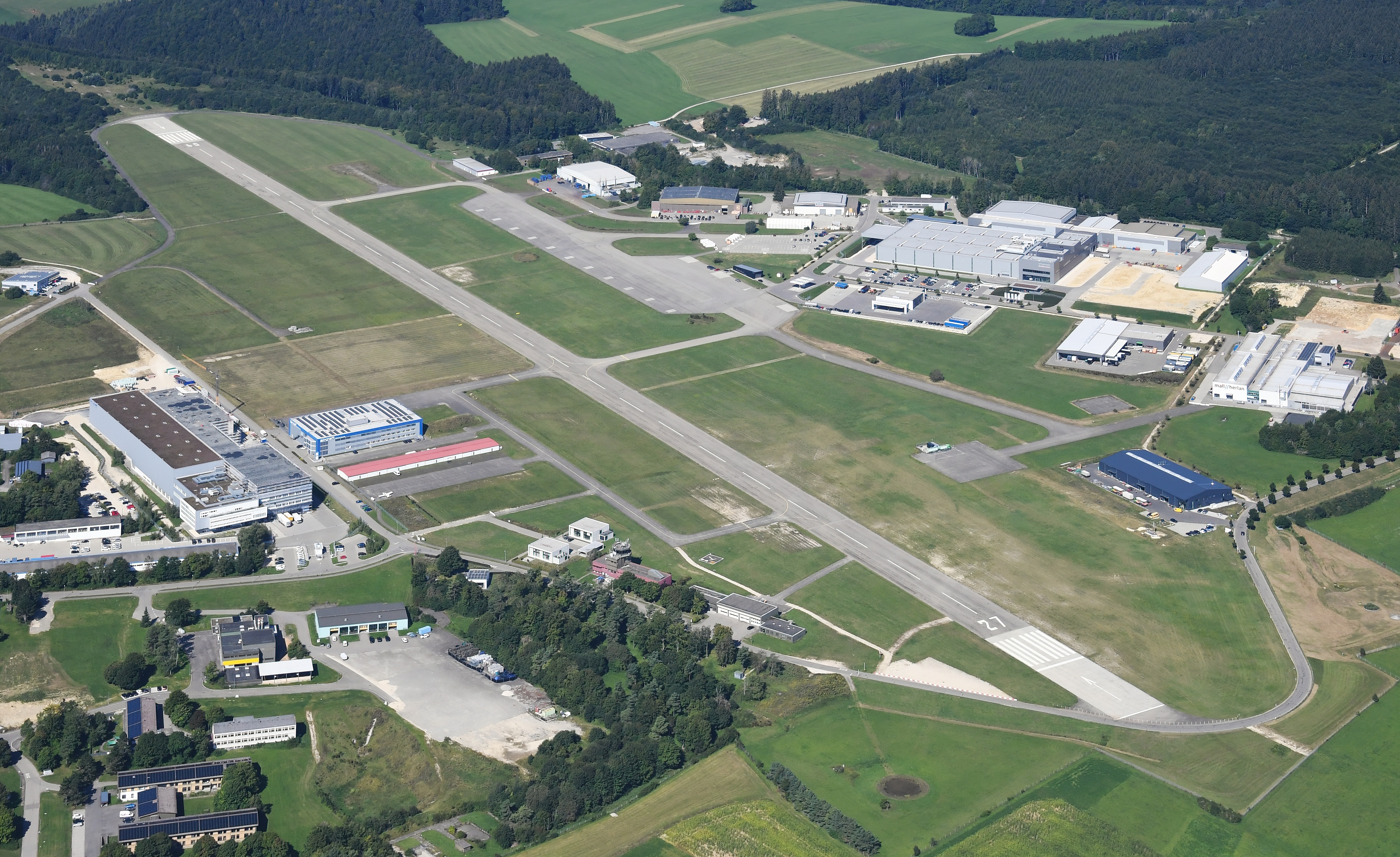
- IATA: none; ICAO: EDSN

Summary
- Airport type: Special airfield
- Owner: take-off GewerbePark Betreibergesellschaft mbH
- Location: Neuhausen ob Eck
- Elevation AMSL: 2,638 ft / 804 m
- Coordinates: 47°58′35″N 8°54′14″E

Map
- Location of airport in Baden-Württemberg, Germany

Runways
Direction	Length		Surface
Direction	m	ft	Surface
09/27	1,248	4,094	Asphalt

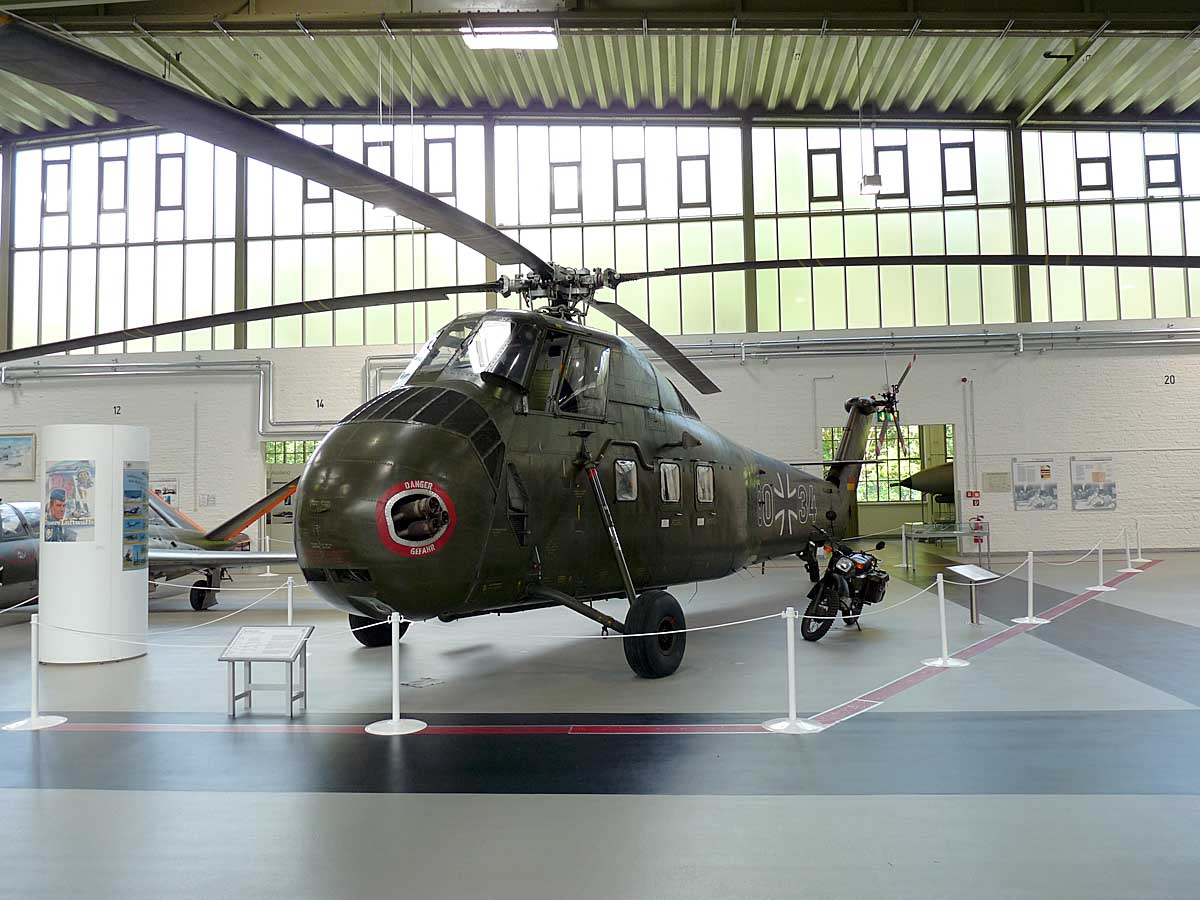
H-34 of the German Army

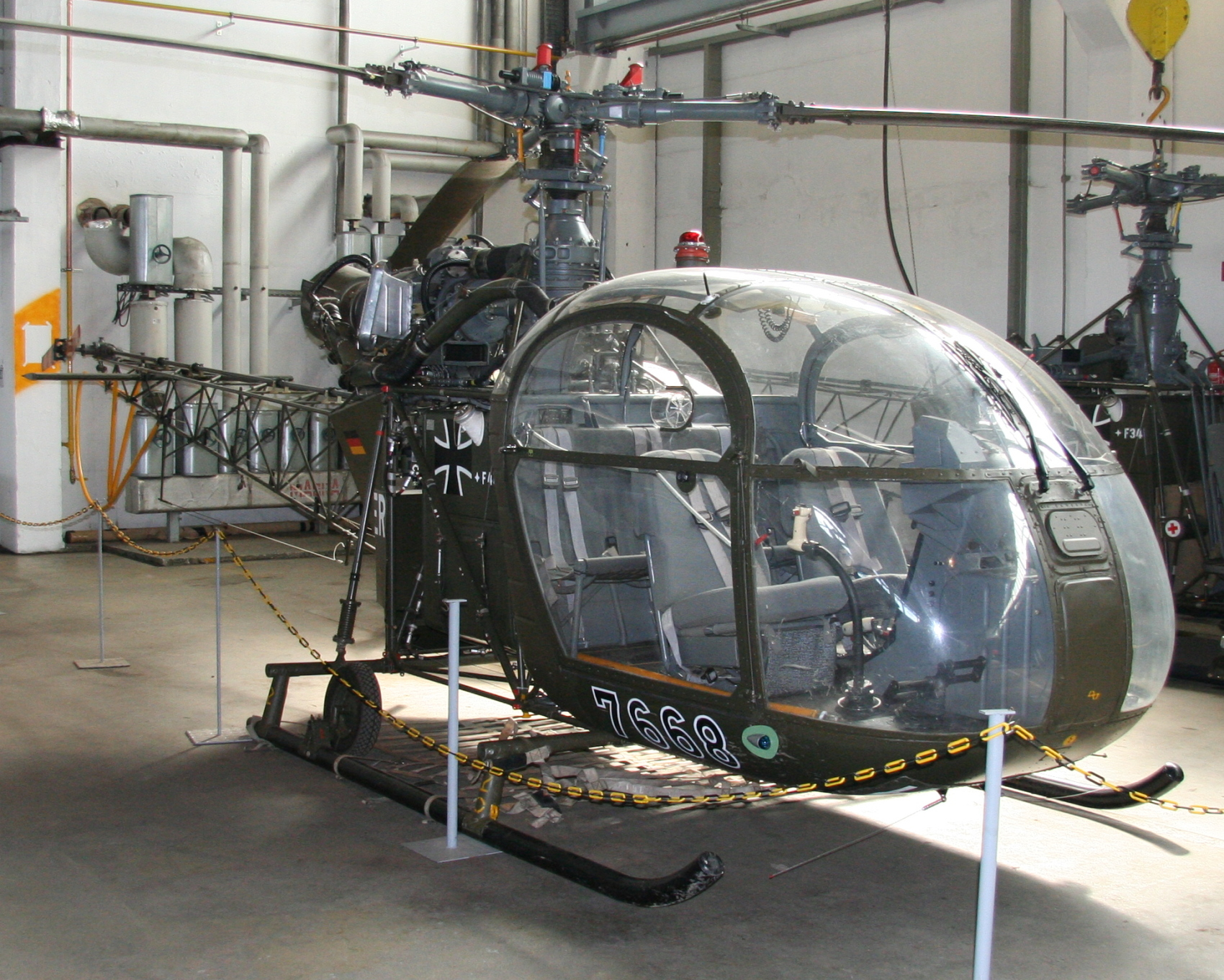
Alouette II of the German Army

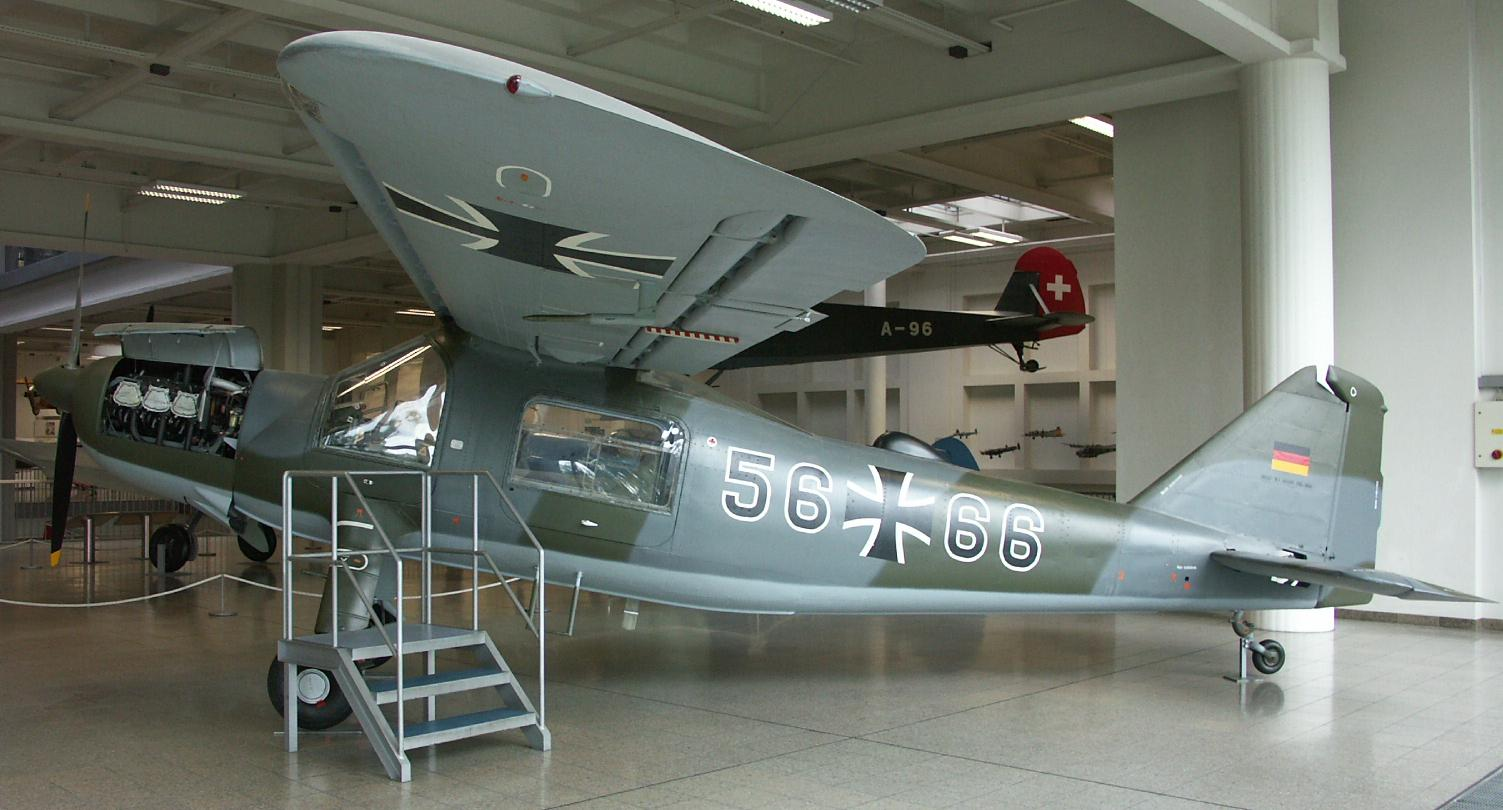
Do 27 of the German Armed Forces

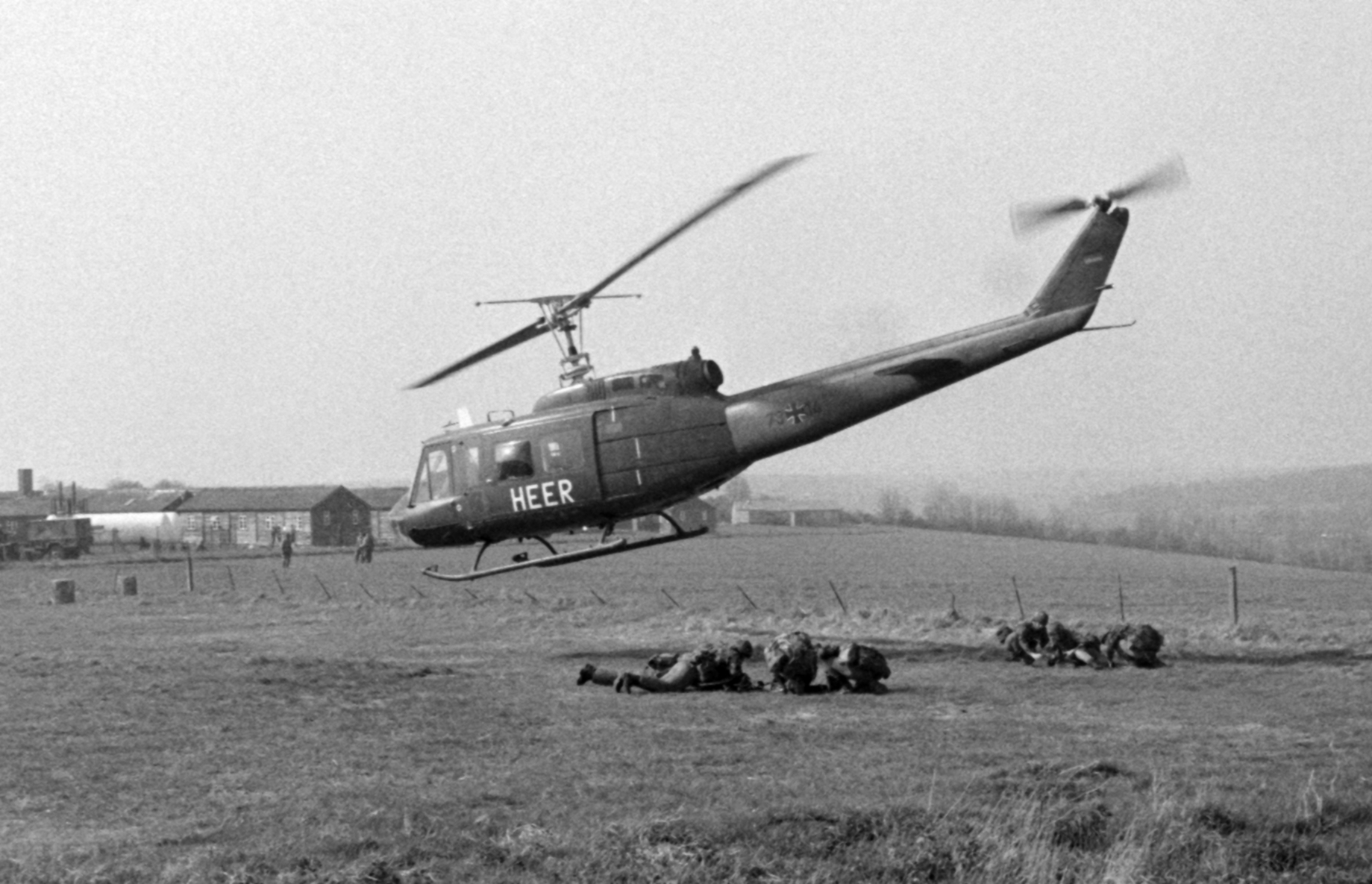
Bell UH-1D of the German Army

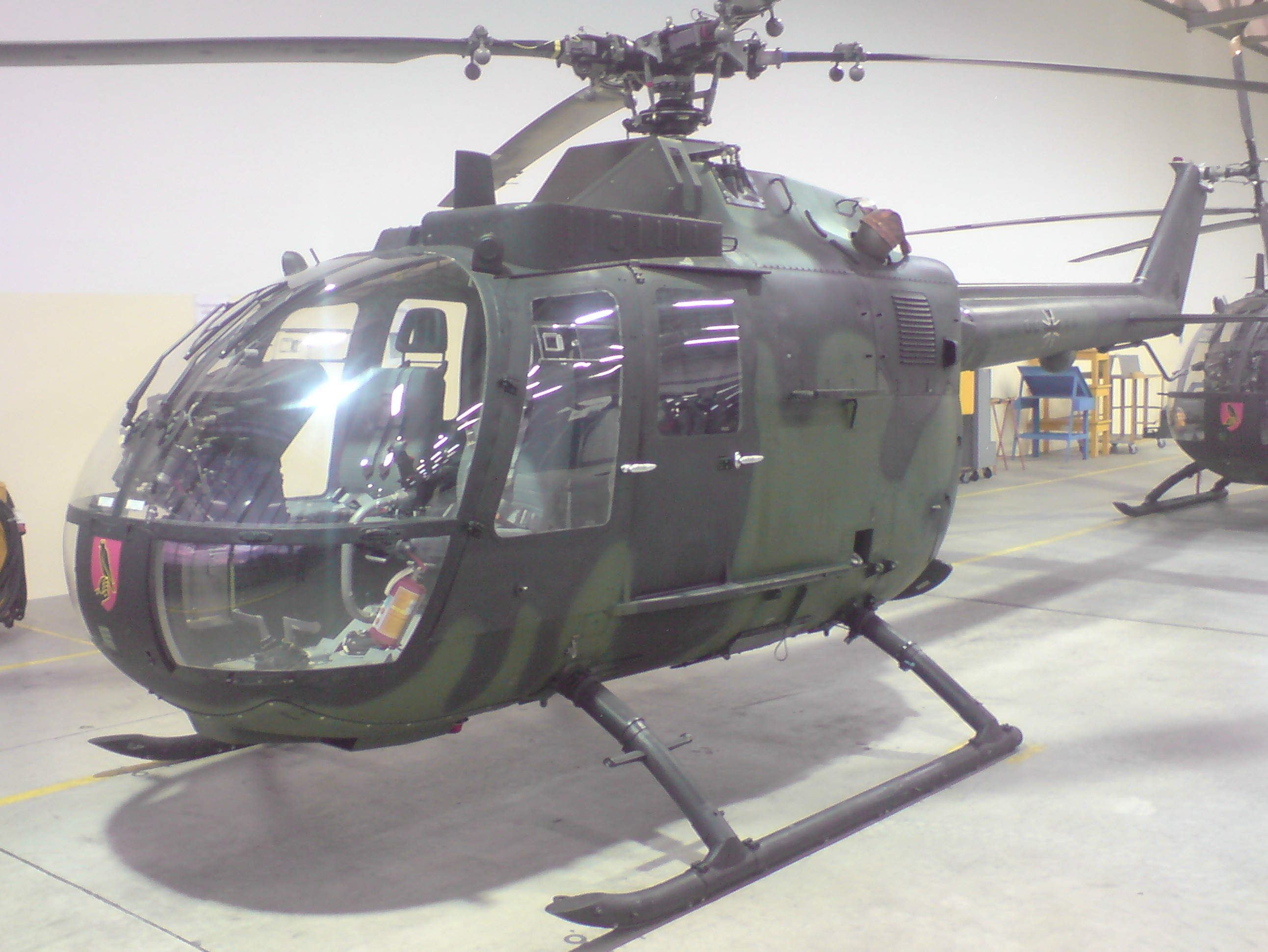
Bo 105M of the German Army

Neuhausen ob Eck Airfield (German: Flugplatz Neuhausen ob Eck, ICAO: EDSN) is a special airfield near the town of Neuhausen ob Eck in the district of Tuttlingen in Baden-Württemberg, Southern Germany. Used as a military airbase by the German Army Aviation Corps until 1994, it was rededicated a special airfield, and is since 1997 the site of the business park take-off GewerbePark Betreibergesellschaft mbH. Since 2002, the airfield also hosts the annual Southside Music Festival.

== Location ==
The 1,43 km^{2} (0,55 sq mi) airfield lies approximately 6.5 kilometres (4.0 mi) east of the town of Tuttlingen at an elevation of 804 m (2638 ft) on District Road 5945, part of Bundesstraße 311 (Federal Highway 311) linking Ulm and Geisingen. Most of the airfield lies within the boundaries of the town of Neuhausen ob Eck itself, although a small part stretches into the territory of the neighbouring village of Nendingen, part of the town of Tuttlingen.

== History ==
Plans by the Luftwaffe to build a military airfield at Neuhausen ob Eck started in 1935. Actual construction began in April 1936. The airbase was originally designated to be used only in the event of war. By 1937, flak positions, ammunition bunkers and the runway had been finished. In 1938, five half-timbered buildings were erected to house the airbase company and the administration unit. The airbase was declared operational on 1 May 1938 even though further works were still necessary to install water supplies and refueling facilities. This construction continued until the summer of 1940.

The third group of Kampfgeschwader 51 (III./KG 51) (Medium Bomber Wing 51) was stationed there from August until October 1939. It was followed by a number of other Luftwaffe units, the last of which departed from the airbase in August 1940, leaving only a small detachment to keep the airbase operational. From the end of 1942 until the autumn of 1944, the compound was used as a military exercise camp by the Hitler Youth and subsequently by the Flying Hitler Youth (Flieger-HJ). Due to the increasing danger of air attacks, the first and second group of Nachtjagdgeschwader 6 (Night Fighter Wing 6), based at Hayingen, used Neuhausen ob Eck Air Base as a storage facility for their aircraft during daylight from the end of 1944 until April 1945. The third group of Jagdgeschwader 53 (Fighter Wing 53) was intermittently based at the airbase between July 1944 and April 1945. The last flying Luftwaffe unit on the airbase was Panzerjagdstaffel 3 (Anti-Tank Squadron 3), equipped with Bü 181 trainer aircraft. These planes had been converted into combat aircraft by fitting underwing-mounted launchers for Panzerfaust anti-tank grenades. Panzerjagd Squadron 3 arrived at the airbase on 19 April 1945 before withdrawing further east on 21 April 1945, a few hours before the airbase was occupied by the French Army. Subsequently, the French Army used the airbase for the collection of confiscated cattle and as a storage facility for ammunition. In 1948, the French military left the premises.

In 1958, the former Luftwaffe airbase at Neuhausen ob Eck was chosen by the Federal Ministry of Defence as one of the airfields for the newly established German Army Aviation Corps and to house an army aviation squadron. It was allocated the ICAO code EDSN. Neuhausen ob Eck Air Base remained under French administration until 1963, when the compound was handed over to the German government. In 1965, the German Army Aviation Corps became the new occupant of the airbase. With the arrival of Army Aviation Squadron 10, relocating from Friedrichshafen Air Base, Neuhausen ob Eck Air Base became operational in 1966. Army Aviation Squadron 10 flew Alouette II and Sikorsky H-34 helicopters as well as Dornier Do 27 fixed-wing aircraft. However, the German Army had realised that helicopters would fulfill the Army Aviation Corps' designated tasks better than fixed-wing aircraft, and the Dornier 27 were phased out. From 1964 on, these aircraft were handed over to other users so that Army Aviation Squadron 10 only had a few Do 27 at their disposal when they arrived at Neuhausen ob Eck Air Base. The majority of aircraft used were helicopters. Transport helicopter H-34 was also gradually transferred to other units around the same time. In 1967, the squadron was renamed Army Aviation Battalion 10. Four years later, in 1971, the unit was returned its original designation, Army Aviation Squadron 10, when No 2 Squadron of Army Aviation Battalion 10 moved to Roth Air Base to form, together with other elements of the German Army Aviation Corps, Army Aviation Regiment 20. In 1979, this regiment, flying Bell UH-1D, relocated to Neuhausen ob Eck Air Base. In 1983, the helicopters flown by Army Aviation Squadron 10, Alouette II, were replaced with the Bo 105M.

Following the German reunification in 1990, a reform of the German Army resulted in the disbanding of all German Army Aviation Corps units based on Neuhausen ob Eck Air Base and the subsequent closure of the airbase itself. The fly-out took place on 28 September 1993 and Army Aviation Regiment 20 and Army Aviation Squadron 10 were disbanded with Army Aviation Squadron 10 partially relocating to Laupheim Air Base to form the new Army Aviation Support Squadron 10. Subsequently, the compound was briefly used by the military police, Training Company of Military Police Battalion 750, before being acquired by the town of Neuhausen ob Eck in 1997. In 2000, it was renamed take-off Gewerbe-Park (take-off Business Park).

== Current use ==
=== The airfield ===
The former military airbase is now designated a special airfield and can be used by fixed-wing aircraft with a weight of up to 5.700 kg, helicopters, motor gliders and ultralight fixed-wing aircraft. Since 2001, the airfield is equipped with a hangar, offering storage possibilities for 15 aircraft. Refuelling is not possible at the airfield.

Neuhausen ob Eck Airfield is the venue for the annual Southside Festival, a music festival established in 2000, usually held over three days in June, and drawing about 50,000 spectators every year.

=== The business park ===
More than 50 companies from various branches of manufacturing, trade and the service sector use the premises as their business location.

== Post-World War II military occupants ==
The following units of the German Armed Forces were stationed at Neuhausen ob Eck Air Base:

- Army Aviation Squadron 10 (1966–1967)
- Army Aviation Battalion 10 (1967–1971)
- Army Aviation Squadron 10 (1971–1994)
- Army Aviation Regiment 20 (1979–1994)
- Army Airbase Headquarters 203 (1973–1994)
- Training Company of Military Police Battalion 750 (1994–1995)

== See also ==
- History of the German Army Aviation Corps
- List of airports in Germany
