= Altenstadt =

Altenstadt (German pronunciation: [ˈaltn̩ʃtat], lit. 'old town' or 'old city') may refer to:

== Places ==
=== Austria ===
- Altenstadt (Feldkirch), a city district of Feldkirch, Vorarlberg
  - Altenstadt railway station

=== France ===
- Altenstadt, part of Wissembourg, Alsace

=== Germany ===
- Altenstadt, Hesse, in the district Wetterau, Hesse
- Altenstadt, Swabia, in the district Neu-Ulm, Bavaria
- Altenstadt, Upper Bavaria, in the district Weilheim-Schongau, Bavaria
  - Altenstadt Air Base
- Altenstadt an der Waldnaab, in the district Neustadt (Waldnaab), Bavaria

== Other ==
- Altenstadt Hulme, a South African rugby union footballer
- Von Schmidt auf Altenstadt, a noble family

== See also ==
- Altstadt (disambiguation)
- Neustadt, German for "new town" or "new city"
