= Abraham Klausner (Austrian rabbi) =

Austrian rabbi

Abraham Klausner was an Austrian rabbi and ritualist who flourished at Vienna in the second half of the fourteenth century.

He shared the rabbinical office at Vienna with Meir ben Baruch Halevi (Jacob Weil, Responsa, No. 151).

Aaron Blumlein and Shalom of Wiener-Neustadt, were among his contemporaries. Two of his pupils were Isaac Tyrnau and Jacob Mölln. His collection of ritual customs ("minhagim"), with his notes, was published at Riva di Trento in 1559. The editor of Mölln's "Minhage Maharil" added in several cases some of the minhagim collected by Klausner. His responsa are referred to by Israel Isserlein in his "Pesaḳim u-Ketabim" (No. 6).
