= Neustadt =

Neustadt (German pronunciation: [ˈnɔʏʃtat], lit. 'new town' or 'new city') may refer to:

== Places ==
- Neustadt (urban district)

=== Czech Republic ===
- Neustadt an der Mettau, Nové Město nad Metují
- Neustadt an der Tafelfichte, Nové Město pod Smrkem
- Nové Město na Moravě (German: Neustadt in Mähren)

=== Germany ===
==== Bavaria ====
- Neustadt an der Aisch, the capital of the district Neustadt an der Aisch-Bad Windsheim
- Neustadt bei Coburg, a town in the district of Coburg
- Neustadt an der Donau, a town in the district of Kelheim
- Neustadt am Kulm, a town in the district of Neustadt (Waldnaab)
- Neustadt am Main, a town in the district of Main-Spessart
- Neustadt an der Waldnaab, the capital of the district of Neustadt (Waldnaab)

==== Brandenburg ====
- Neustadt an der Dosse, a town in the district of Ostprignitz-Ruppin
- Amt Neustadt (Dosse), a collective municipality in Neustadt (Dosse)

==== Lower Saxony ====
- Neustadt am Rübenberge, a town in the district of Hanover

==== Rhineland-Palatinate ====
- Neustadt an der Weinstraße, a city and urban district, the largest city of that name in Germany
  - Neustadt (Weinstraße) Hauptbahnhof, a railway station
- Neustadt, Westerwaldkreis, a municipality in the district Westerwaldkreis
- Neustadt (Wied), a municipality in the district of Neuwied

==== Saxony ====
- Neustadt in Sachsen, a town in the district of Sächsische Schweiz
  - Neustadt (Sachs) railway station
- Neustadt, Vogtland, a municipality in the district Vogtlandkreis

==== Thuringia ====
- Neustadt, Eichsfeld, a municipality in the district of Eichsfeld
- Neustadt an der Orla, a town in the district Saale-Orla-Kreis
- Neustadt am Rennsteig, a municipality in the district of Ilm-Kreis in Thuringia

==== Other places in Germany ====
- Halle-Neustadt, a modern high-rise residential town built during the GDR. Since reunification, it was united with Halle (Saale)
- Neustadt, a municipal district of Bremen
- Neustadt, Hamburg, a quarter within the borough of Hamburg-Mitte
- Neustadt, Hesse, a town in the district of Marburg-Biedenkopf, Hesse
- Neustadt, a community in the town of Breuberg, Hesse
- Neustadt in Holstein, a town in the district of Ostholstein, Schleswig-Holstein
- Neustadt, a part of the urban district of Innenstadt, Cologne, North Rhine-Westphalia
- Neustadt, a town and part of the municipality Titisee-Neustadt, Baden-Württemberg

=== Hungary ===
- Neustadt am Zeltberg, Sátoraljaújhely
- Neustadt an der Donau, Dunaújváros
- Neustadt an der Tisza, Tiszaújváros

=== Poland ===
- Neustadt an der Warthe, Nowe Miasto nad Wartą
- Neustadt bei Pinne, Lwówek
- Neustadt in Oberschlesien, Prudnik
- Neustadt in Westpreußen, Wejherowo

=== Other places ===
- Neustadt, Ontario, Canada
- Neustadt (Strasbourg), a district of Strasbourg, France
- Noiștat, Sibiu, Romania
- Neustadt im Burzenland or Cristian, Brașov, Romania
- Neustadt an der Waag or Nové Mesto nad Váhom, Slovakia
- Wiener Neustadt, Austria

== Other uses ==
- Neustadt (surname), a surname (including a list of people with the name)
- Neustadt International Prize for Literature, an American literary award
- NSK Neustadt Prize for Children's Literature, an American literary award
- Neustadt, the hometown of the protagonist in Emil and the Detectives

== See also ==
- Neustadt, Dresden (disambiguation)
- Altstadt and Altenstadt: German for "old town" or "old city"
