= Paris Book of Customs =

Oldest illustrated Yiddish-language book

The Paris Book of Customs is a Sefer Minhagim (book of religious customs) and the oldest illustrated Yiddish-language book. Completed in or before 1503, it consists of 121 folios, of which 94 are illustrated. The style of the illustrations and the language used indicates it was most likely created in Italy. Originally owned by a single family, presumably Ashkenazi immigrants from Germany or Austria, the book came into the possession of Cardinal Richelieu some time after 1632 and was stored at the Sorbonne before being moved to the Bibliothèque nationale de France, where it is currently stored as Ms. Héb 586.

Written in "clear, concise language", the book was intended for a middle class family as a reference work for religious practice. Illustrations include the arrest of Gedaliah, the stoning of Amalek and a celebration after Tisha B'Av. The text itself was largely copied from the Sefer HaMinhagim of Isaac Tyrnau.

== Bibliography ==
- Birnbaum, Salomo A. (2011). Ein Leben für die Wissenschaft: Wissenschaftliche Aufsätze aus Sechs Jahrzehnten. Walter de Gruyter. ISBN 978-3-11-025194-4.
- Wolfthal, Diane (2004). Picturing Yiddish: Gender, Identity, and Memory in the Illustrated Yiddish Books of Renaissance Italy. Leiden: Boston. ISBN 9004139052.
