= Altstetten =

Altstetten may refer to:

== Places ==
- Altstetten, Erdweg, Bavaria, Germany
- Altstetten, Rennertshofen, Bavaria, Germany
- Altstetten (Zürich), Canton of Zurich, Switzerland
  - Zürich Altstetten railway station

== People ==
- Konrad von Altstetten, a German petty nobleman and poet

== See also ==
- Altstadt (disambiguation)
- Altstätten, Canton of St. Gallen, Switzerland
