= Neustadt, Dresden =

Neustadt, Dresden or Dresden-Neustadt may refer to:

- Innere Neustadt (Dresden), a quarter of Dresden
- Äußere Neustadt, a quarter of Dresden
- Dresden-Neustadt railway station
- Neustadt (Dresden), an administrative borough (Stadtbezirk) comprising Innere Neustadt, Äußere Neustadt, Leipziger Vorstadt, Radeberger Vorstadt and Albertstadt, see Geography and urban development of Dresden

== See also ==
- Neustadt (disambiguation)
