= Altstadt (disambiguation) =

Altstadt (German pronunciation: [ˈaltˌʃtat]), German for "old town", is a historical city centre.

== Places ==
Altstadt may also refer to the following places:

- Altstadt Salzburg, the historic city centre of Salzburg, Austria
- Germany:
  - Altstadt (Düsseldorf), historic city centre of Düsseldorf
  - Altstadt (Frankfurt am Main), historic city centre
  - Altstadt, Hamburg, historic city centre
  - Altona-Altstadt, quarter in Hamburg, historic center of the city Altona
  - Altstadt (Munich), historic city centre of Munich
  - Altstadt Spandau, historic centre of Spandau, now part of Berlin
- Prussia:
  - Altstadt (Königsberg), historic city centre of Königsberg
- Altstadt (Zürich), historic city centre of Zurich, Switzerland

== People ==
- Audrey Altstadt, a US-American historian

== See also ==
- Altenstadt (disambiguation)
- Altstetten (disambiguation)
- Neustadt (disambiguation), German for "new town" or "new city"
