= Neustadt (surname) =

Neustadt (German pronunciation: [ˈnɔʏʃtat]) is a German and Ashkenazi Jewish surname meaning "new town".

Notable people with this surname include:

- Aaron of Neustadt (died 1421), Austrian Talmudist
- Bernardo Neustadt (1925–2008), Argentinian journalist
- Richard Neustadt (1919–2003), American political scientist
