= Neustadt (urban district) =

German-language district name

An urban district named Neustadt (German: [ˈnɔʏʃtat]) exists in many cities in Germany and other countries where the administrative language was German for centuries.

"Neustadt" means "new town", but very often this district is not really new.

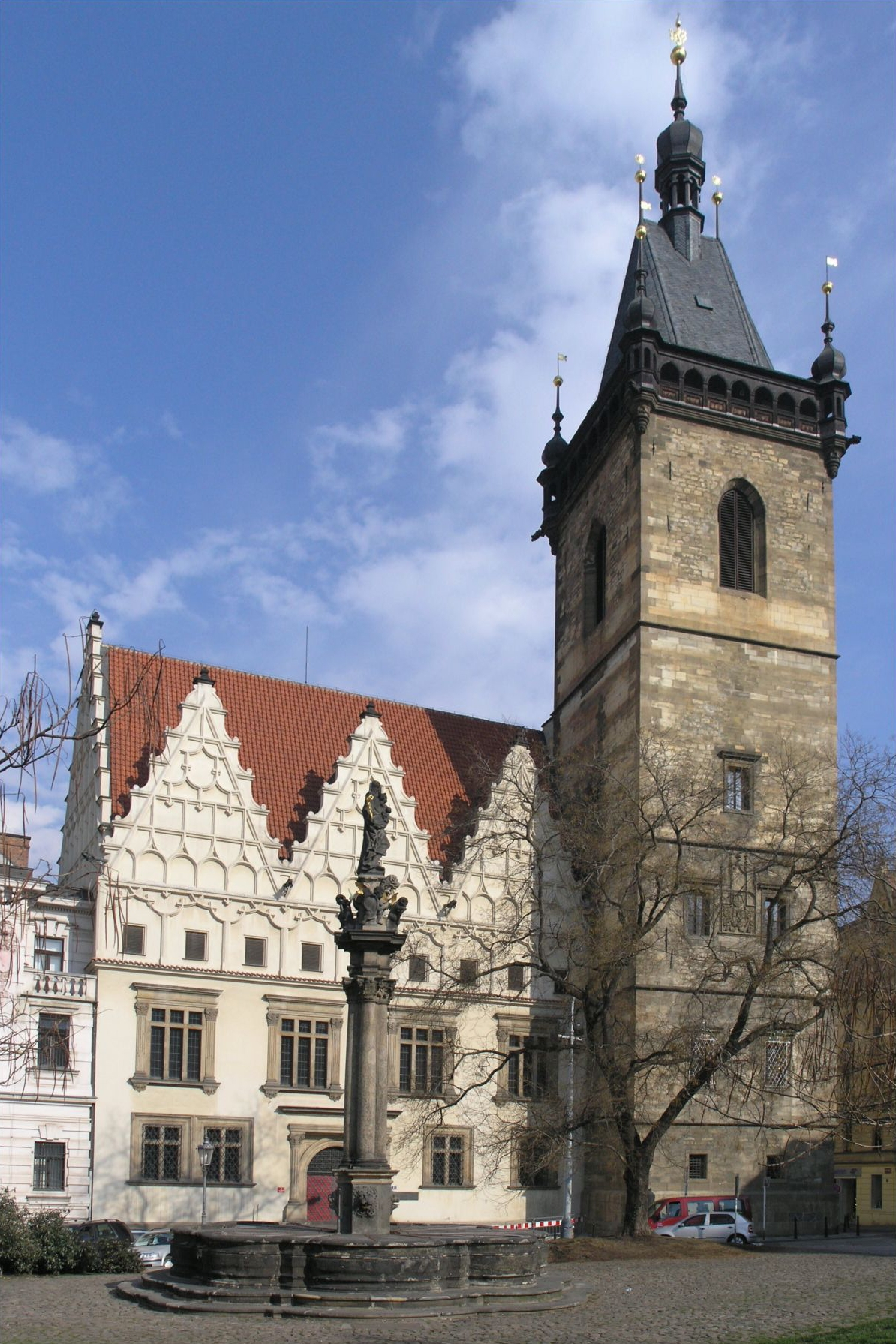
City hall of Prague's Nové Město

== High Middle Ages ==
In many places the founders, for political reasons, placed a second urban nucleus ("Neustadt") beneath the first one ("Altstadt"). Examples are Bielefeld in Westphalia and Elbing in the territory of the Teutonic Order (now Elbląg in Poland). In Bielefeld, the Altstadt concentrated on trade, the Neustadt concentrated on logistics for the ruler and government of the County of Ravensberg, which was seated at Sparrenburg Castle above the town. In Wrocław, Silesia, the Neustadt was the German foundation beneath the original Polish Altstadt.

== Late Middle Ages ==
In some places the "Neustadt" was a late medieval enlargement, sometimes the consequence of a growth of population, sometimes of modernized fortifications.

Prague, with the foundation of the Nové Město (Neustadt) by Charles IV in 1348, became one of the first widespread cities north of the Alps. Nevertheless, in mediaeval tradition it became a separate municipality, the fourth one in Prague. The Neustadt in Bremen (without separate institutions) was built in the 17th century in order to keep distance between the new city wall (and possible besiegers) and the city's harbour.

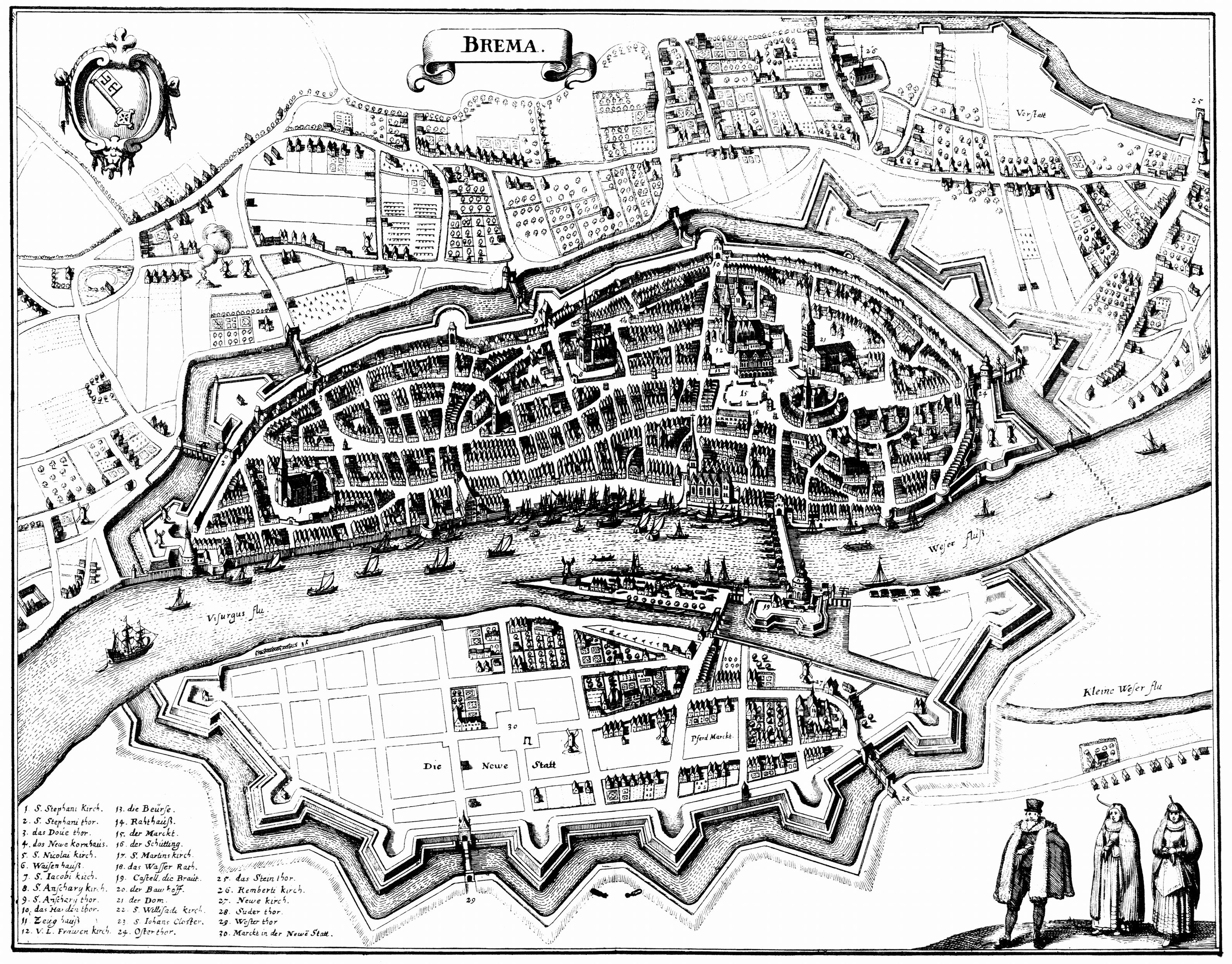
Bremen 1641: "Die Newe Stadt" south of the river still contains few buildings

== See also ==
- Neustadt (disambiguation), for a list of places called Neustadt
