= Meir ben Baruch Halevi =

German Ashkenazi rabbi (died 1406)

Rabbi Meir ben Baruch HaLevi of Vienna (died 1406), also known as Maharam Sal or Maharam Fulda, was an Ashkenazi rabbi, one of the most important in central Europe in the period following the Tosafists. He was involved in the debate over the ordaining of French rabbis in his time, and some have attribute to him the founding of modern Ashkenazi semicha.

== Biography ==
Little is known about his life. He was born in Fulda, and therefore is sometimes called "Maharam Fulda". His father was apparently killed during the Persecution of Jews during the Black Death. He served as rabbi of Erfurt and then of Frankfurt. In 1383 he moved to Nuremberg, but two years later returned to Frankfurt. In the following years he was imprisoned for some time due to a false allegation. In 1392 he was freed and moved to Vienna, where he served as rosh yeshiva. It was said that he brought to Vienna "all the sources of the religion and customs" of the Rhineland, and this move symbolized the transfer of the center of Ashkenazi Torah culture from Ashkenaz to Austria for generations to come. The last known official record mentioning him dates to 1406, and as later his wife is mentioned as a widow, he apparently died then.

Isaac ben Sheshet (Rivash), despite his dispute with Meir over ordination, respected Meir and described him as "the great eagle, great of wings, full of Torah, who has wisdom".

Few of Meir's halachic positions survive in writing. However, his stature among Ashkenazi rabbis is shown by his appearance in many Memorbuch lists alongside figures such as Rabbeinu Gershom, Rashi, Rabbeinu Tam, and Meir of Rothenburg.

== The French ordination dispute ==
He played an important role in the ordination dispute in France in his lifetime. Rabbi Mattitiah Treves had been known as "head of the French rabbis", and upon his death bequeathed this title to his son Yohanan Treves. However, a different student of Mattitiah's, Yeshayah ben Abba Mari who served as rabbi in Savoy contested this. Yeshayah turned to Meir ben Baruch Halevi, who gave him a semicha document, establishing that Yeshayah had the sole right to appoint rabbis in the entire kingdom of France. Yohanan, though, turned to Isaac ben Sheshet, who argued that Meir's authority to make such decrees was limited to Ashkenaz. The resulting debate drew in rabbis across Europe.

Based on this episode, many modern scholars have concluded that Meir founded the institution of Ashkenazi semicha ("moreinu" semicha), i.e. explicit granting of the title "Moreinu" by a rabbi to his student, as a precondition to the student's serving in a rabbinic role. This title is first recorded in the French ordination dispute, suggesting that it was founded by Meir, and this was the accepted scholarly opinion in the past. More recently, other scholars have rejected this argument, noting that Yeshayah's opponents (Yohanan and Isaac ben Sheshet) seem to treat semicha as a preexisting institution, arguing that Meir's controversial innovation was that the requirement of ordination by Meir should apply internationally and not only within the circles of Meir's students.
