= Von Schmidt auf Altenstadt =

Dutch and former German noble family

Coat of arms of von Schmidt auf Altenstadt family

The Von Schmidt auf Altenstadt is a Dutch and former German noble family. Also known as Schmidt von Altenstadt, it has branches in other countries including the Netherlands.

== History ==
Johann Fabricius served Maximilian II against the Turks and was given a coat of arms by the imperial Letters Patent of 2 November 1564. His son Martin was ennobled on 10 December 1577. They were granted a swan coat-of-arms where the swan is in an attack position on the shield; this is repeated in miniature "above the crown".

The Fabricius family reverted around 1638 to the surname of Schmidt and on 23 February 1713, were granted the additive "auf Altenstadt".

On 18 October 1712/23 February 1713 the Emperor Charles VI granted augmentation of a knight's arm holding a sword to the swan coat-of-arms, to heirs Anton Johann Christoph, Johann Georg, and Christopher Wolf (successive lords of Gattendorf). The three brothers succeeded each other, one after the other, as lords of Gattendorf; the first two died without heirs. The third brother had children and the line continued.

Family members are still to be found in the Netherlands, the United States and England.

== Dutch branch ==
- Johann George Otto Stuart von Schmidt auf Altenstadt (born 1806 Sint-Oedenrode, died 1857 the Hague), was a Governor-General of Surinam in 1852–55. This branch counts the head of the family: jhr. Johan Erik Arthur von Schmidt auf Altenstadt (1937), born in The Hague but residing, like his descendants, in Great Britain.

== German branch ==
A direct descendant from Johann Schmidt/Fabricius was Hans-Georg who grew up in Danzig, West Prussia. Hans-Georg Schmidt von Altenstadt (21 August 1904 − 25 July 1944) was Generalmajor of the Wehrmacht on 1 July 1944. He was married to the former Lillian Thordsen with whom he had three daughters. His father, Ulrich Friedrich Philipp, (born 1872) was a major and adjutant to Field-marshal von Mackensen, Commander of life Hussar Brigade in Danzig-Langfur. His grandfather Eduard von Altenstadt married in Gross-Medunischken with Anna Theodora von Bujack (1848–1910) married on 28 June 1868 and his elder son Sigismund was born in 1869 and his younger son Ulrich (Hans-Georg's father) was born in 1872. Grandfather Eduard was a Major General whose full name was Johann Georg Eduard Schmidt von Altenstadt (1796–1850) who married Johanna Friedericke Auguste Ernestin née Homann (1797–1864).

Hans-Georg Schmidt von Altenstadt was the author of the book Unser Weg zur Meer.

== Literature ==
- Genealogisches Handbuch des Adels 135 (2004), p. 431-435.
- Nederland's Adelsboek 92 (2006-2007), p. 412-449.
