= Isaac Tyrnau =

14th century Austrian (or Hungarian) rabbi

Rabbi Isaac Tyrnau (יצחק אייזיק מטירנא or יצחק טירנאו; also Isaak Tyrnau) was an Austrian (or Hungarian) rabbi, born in the late 14th century and active in the 15th century; he is most famous for his Sefer haMinhagim (Book of Customs).

== Biography ==
Little is known about his life. He was born in Vienna and later moved to Tyrnau in Austria, although some suggest Trnava (German: Tyrnau), in modern-day Slovakia (scholars debate what was the medieval Jewish Tyrnau - it may have been Turnov in today's Czech Republic). He studied under Rabbis Abraham Klausner of Vienna and Shalom of Neustadt. It is possible that he later served as rabbi in Pressburg, although this is debated by scholars. His correspondence with the Maharil regarding a divorce (1420) is recorded.

Gabriel Polak and Israel Böhmer published (Königsberg, 1857) an anonymous story entitled "Etzba Elohim," the heroes of which are Isaac Tyrnau and his beautiful daughter. According to legend, a Hungarian prince fell in love with Tyrnau's daughter, converted to Judaism, renounced the throne and married Tyrnau's daughter.

== Works ==
The Sefer haMinhagim (Book of Customs) is a compendium of halachot ("Jewish laws") and minhagim ("customs") of various groups of Ashkenazi Jews, arranged according to the calendar. The work is significantly influenced by those of Tyrnau's teachers. It also contains notes from a Hungarian rabbi, which were already attached with the first printed edition of Tyrnau's work (1566). It is quoted by Mordechai Jaffe at the end of his "Lebush" on Orah Hayyim. As Tyrnau states in the foreword of the book, his intention was to unify the customs. The Black Death around 1348 had almost completely destroyed the German Jewish communities. The number of scholars had diminished so much that in some places "there were only two or three persons who had a real knowledge of local customs".

Tyrnau's work is noted as the first to discuss in detail the idea of the Yahrzeit (the commemoration of the anniversary of a death). It was translated into Yiddish in 1590, and often reprinted. It also contains a treatise on morals entitled "Orhot Hayyim," in 132 sections, which is appended to the Sefer haMinhagim.

This work was to some extent superseded by Minhagei Maharil by Rabbi Yaakov ben Moshe Levi Moelin (Maharil), 1556.
