= History of the German Army Aviation Corps =

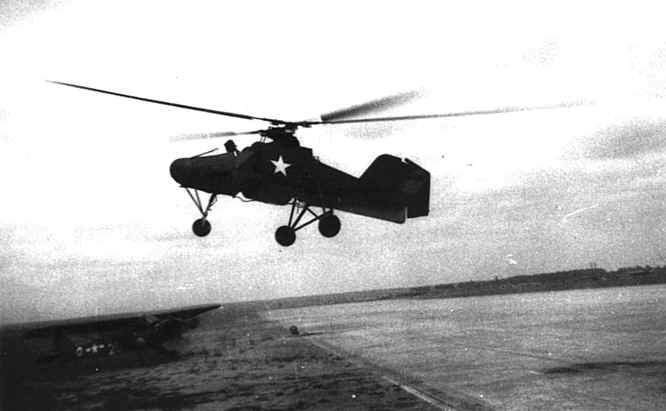
Flettner Fl 282 during trials after end of WWII in USA

The history of the German Army Aviation Corps goes back to the time when the German Wehrmacht first began to develop helicopters.

The first helicopter flight in Germany took place on 26 June 1936 with a Focke-Wulf Fw 61. Despite being an experimental helicopter with only two examples ever built, the Fw 61 inspired Ernst Udet, head of the Reich Air Ministry development wing, to become a proponent of this relatively new type of aircraft after seeing the demonstration flights.

During World War II, several types were considered to be procured for the three different branches of the Wehrmacht. The German Army initially ordered 1,000 Flettner Fl 282 reconnaissance helicopters, however the production plant was destroyed and so only about 40 helicopters entered service. Another project, the more complex Focke Achgelis Fa 223 multi-role helicopter was beset with problems so that ultimately only 11 aircraft were delivered.

== The early years 1955 - 1960 ==
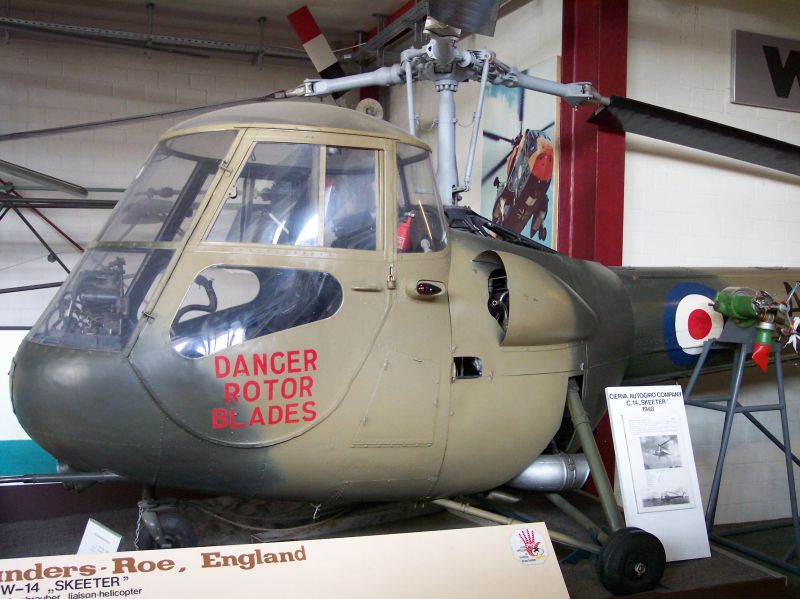
Saro Skeeter

With the foundation of the Bundeswehr in 1955, a decision was made that every branch of the Bundeswehr should have their own helicopter units, operating within the framework of the tasks designated to each branch of the armed forces. Thus, the German Army Aviation Corps was founded.

Even before helicopters had been purchased by the German government, the first officers to become helicopter pilots in the newly formed German Army began their training in August 1956 in the United States at Fort Rucker.

In September 1956, the German government purchased the following types of helicopters for the German Army Aviation Corps:

- 11 Saunders-Roe Skeeter
- 14 Bell 47G
- 26 Sikorsky H-34
- 28 Vertol H-21
- 26 Sud-Ouest SO 1221 Djinn.
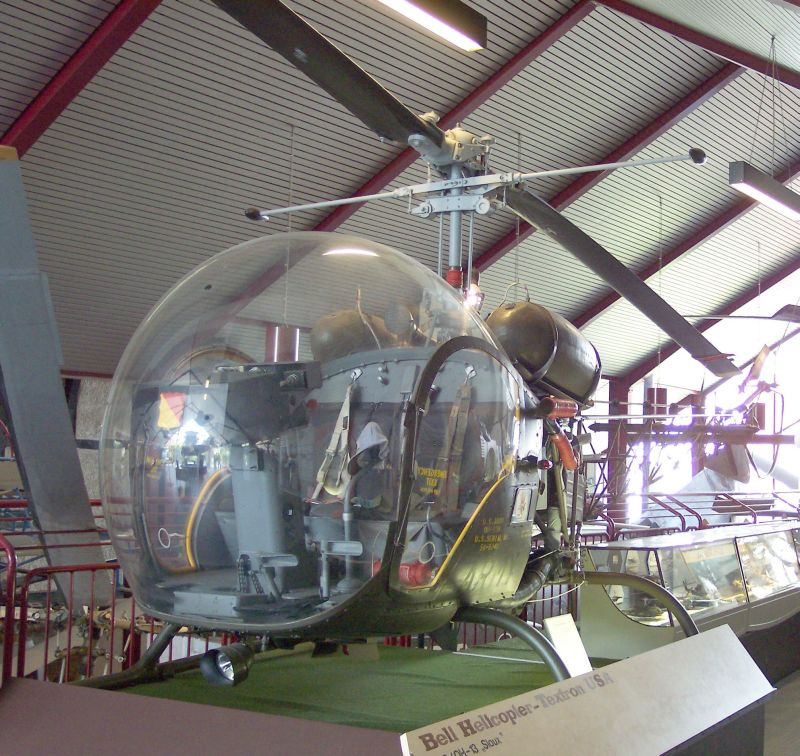
Bell 47G

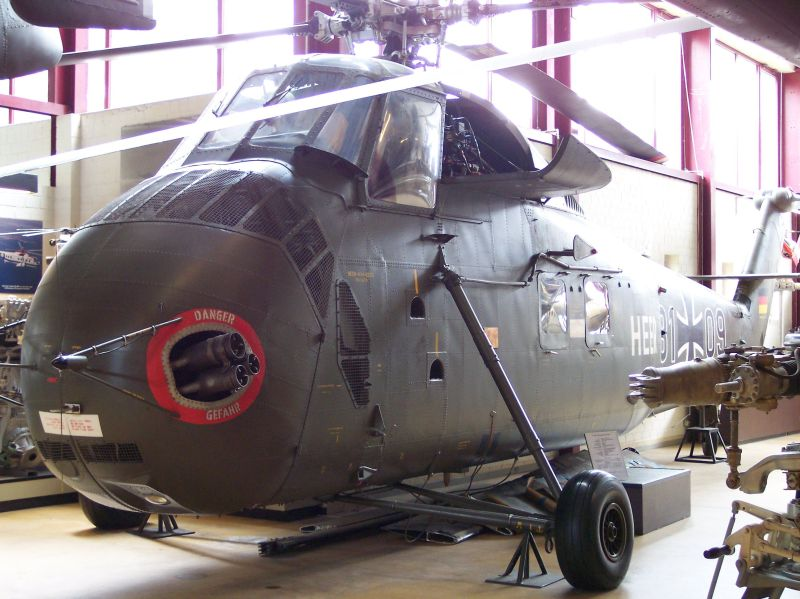
Sikorsky H-34

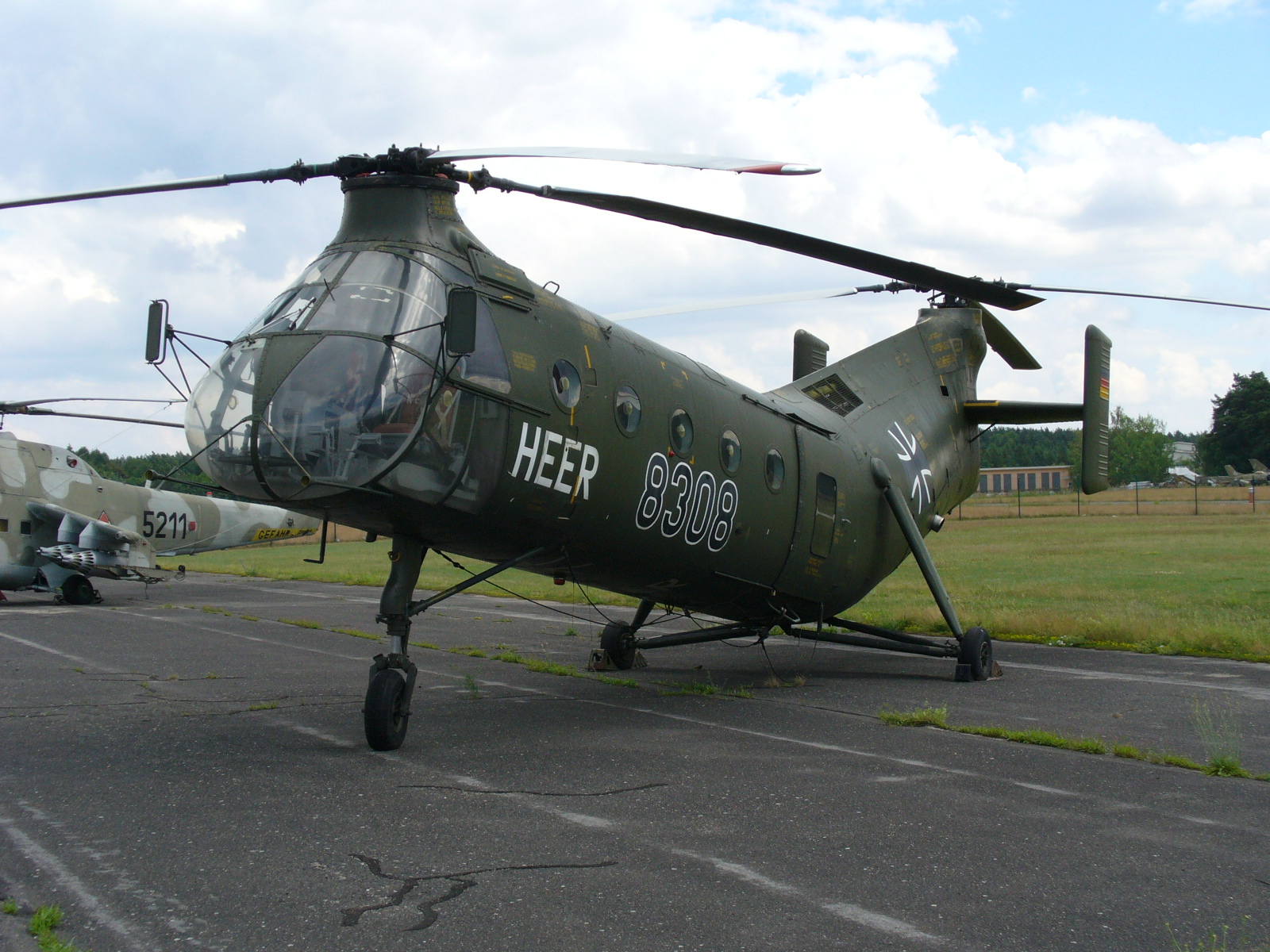
Vertol H-21

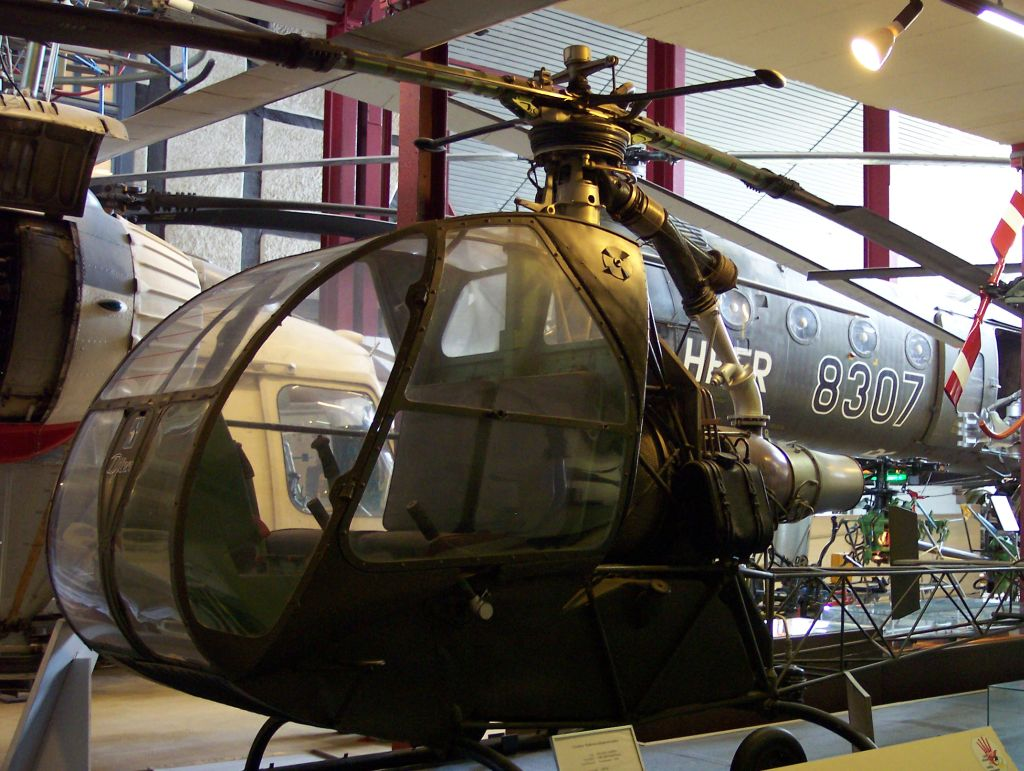
Sud-Ouest SO-1221 Djinn

Additionally, with the Dornier Do 27 a conventional aircraft was also procured.

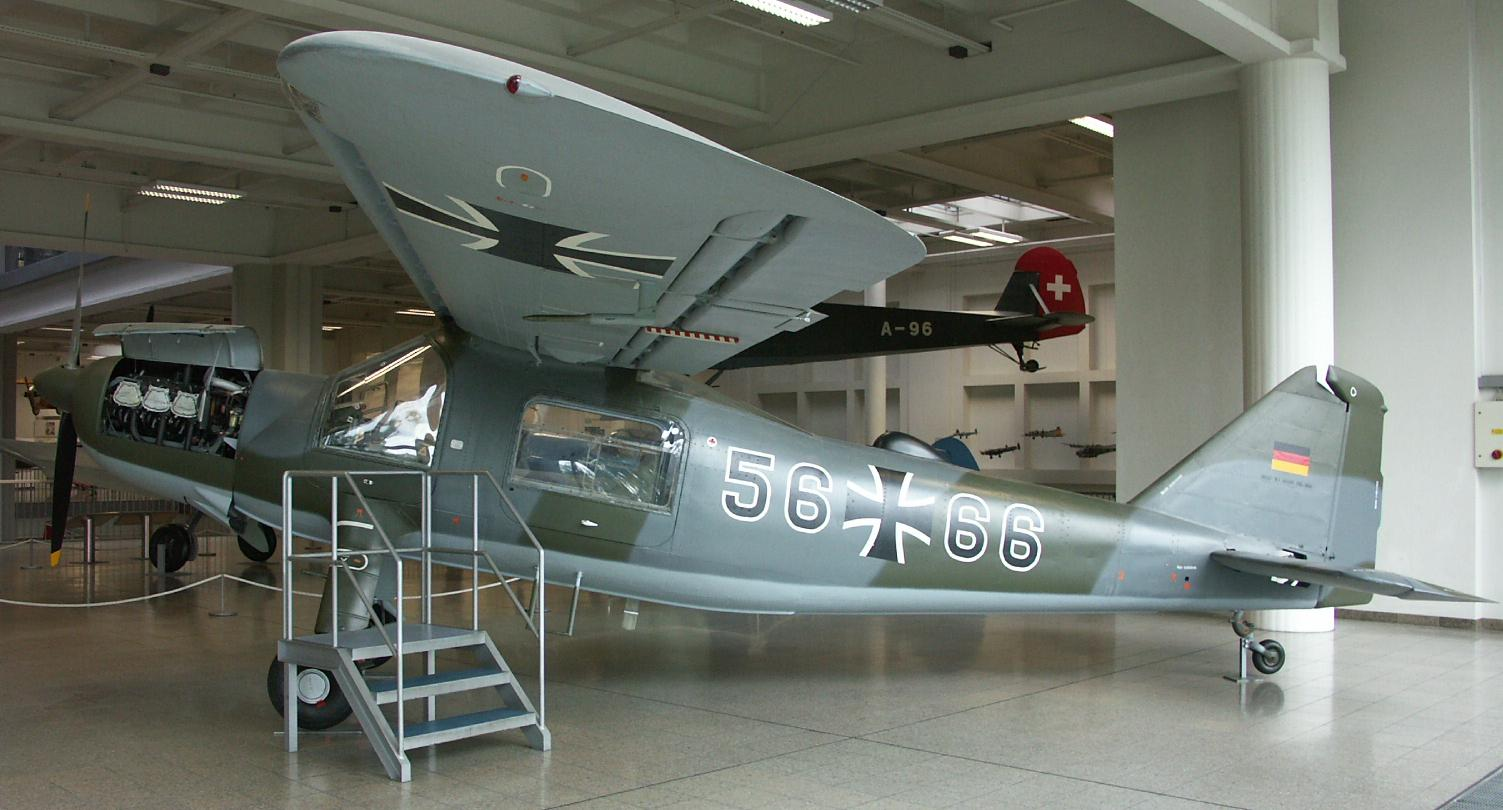
German Dornier Do 27, the only fixed-wing aircraft in service with German Army Aviation Corps

On 7 November 1956, Colonel Horst Pape became the first head of Department German Army Aviation Corps within the General Staff, after having been responsible since 1954 for the planning and setting up of the German Army Aviation Corps. On 7 January 1957, the German Army Aviation Corps took over Mendig Air Base air base from the French Armed Forces. The first aircraft to be used was a Dornier Do 27.

In March 1957, 130 conscripts started their basic training within units of the German Army Aviation Corps.

During 1957, several new bases and squadrons were founded. Niedermendig, later renamed to Mendig, Fritzlar and Celle were the first bases with flying units.

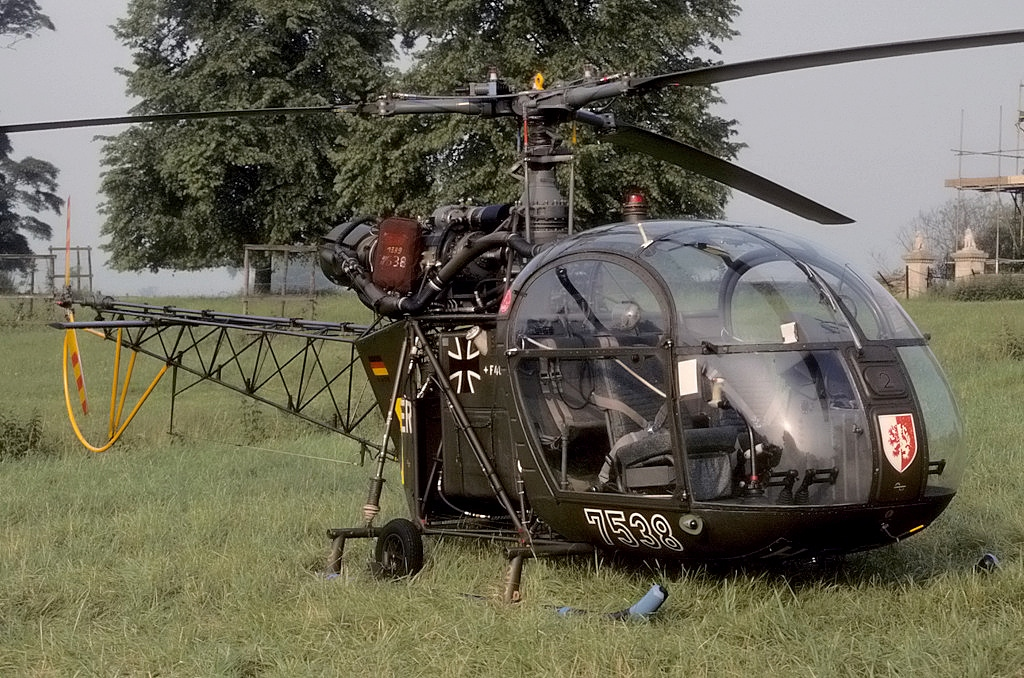
Alouette II

On 9 March 1959, 130 SA318 Alouette II were bought. For more than 40 years, this helicopter was to be the training helicopter of the German Army Aviation Corps.

The first German Army Aviation School (Heeresfliegerwaffenschule) was founded in Niedermendig on 1 July 1959. Its first commanding officer was Colonel Kuno Ebeling.

On 12 January 1960, the instruction unit was transferred to former RAF Bückeburg, now Bückeburg Air Base, at Achum near Bückeburg.

== 1961 - 1990 ==
During the disastrous North Sea flood of 1962, the German Army Aviation Corps came to the rescue of the population of Hamburg and its surroundings, rescuing countless people from drowning. 71 helicopters of the German Federal Army are engaged in rescue supported by 25 helicopters from the US Army.

On 1 April 1963, a teaching unit of the German Army Aviation Corps was established in Zweibrücken. In 1967, this unit, too, was ultimately transferred to Bückeburg.

On 20 August 1963, the first Bell UH-1D was delivered to training units.

On 1 April 1968, Brigadier-General Kurt Kauffmann became the first General of the German Army Aviation Corps.

On 9 June 1971, the helicopter museum of the German Army Aviation Corps in Bückeburg opened for the public.

On 26 July 1971, replacement of the Sikorsky H-34 with Sikorsky CH-53G began.

In 1975, the German Army Aviation Corps received its first flight simulator for the Bell 47G. The purpose of the simulator was not only to train crews for standard situations but also for SAR situations.

During a spread of wildfires in Germany in 1975 and 1976, helicopters of the German Army Aviation Corps contributed to the extinguishing of the fires. During these tasks, the device Smokey for fighting large-scale fires was developed.

In January 1976, German Army Aviation Corps came to the rescue of the population of Cuxhaven and the Haseldorf Marshes, affected by severe flooding.

On 8 May 1978, the first MBB Bo 105P, designed as an anti-tank helicopter, was delivered into service units. Consequently, three regiments equipped with this helicopter were established at Celle Air Base, Roth Air Base and Fritzlar Air Base.

In August 1980, devastating wildfires on Mount Athos in Greece, threatening century-old monasteries, were fought with the aid of German Army Aviation Corps, using their device Smokey.

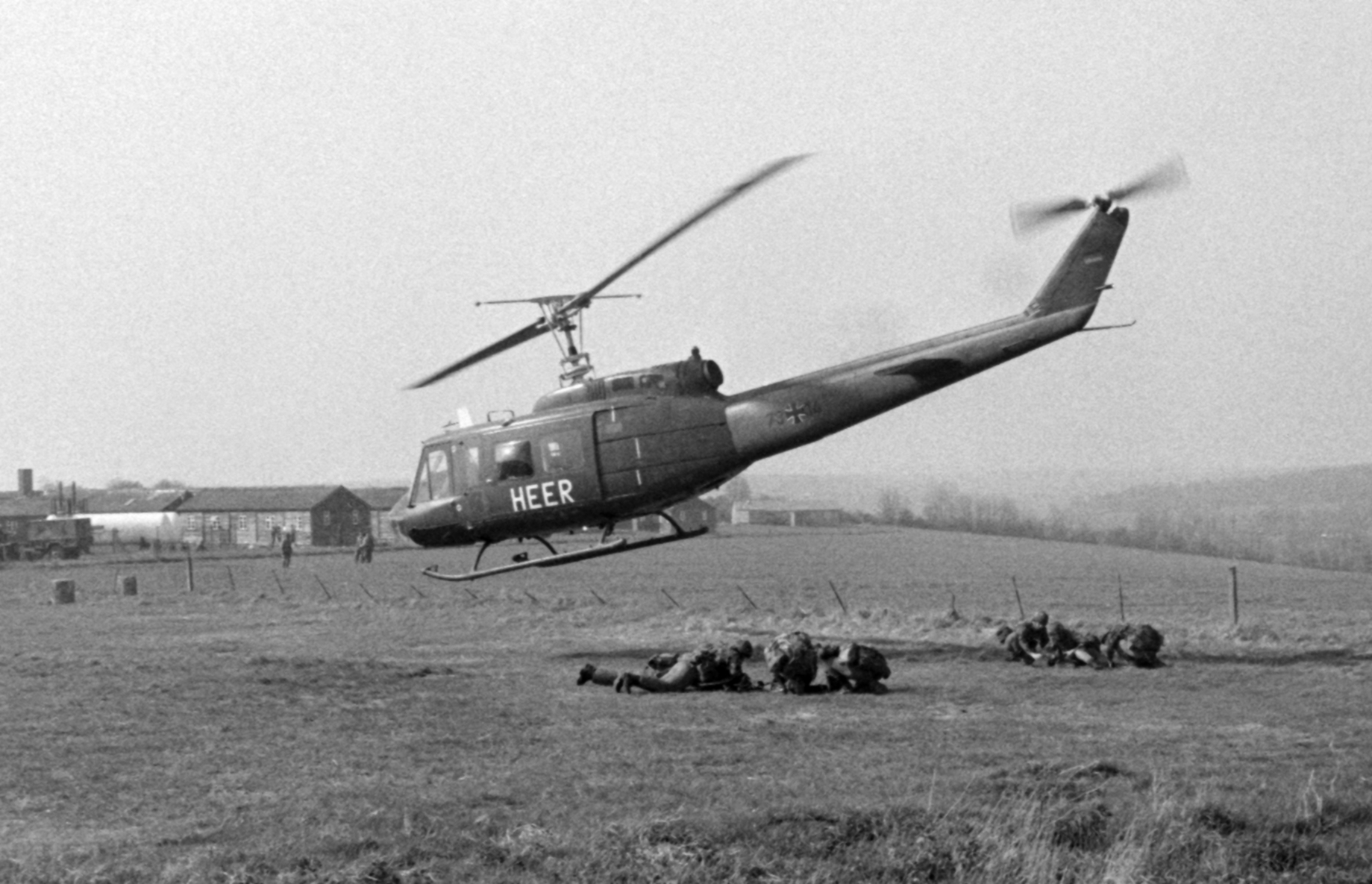
Bell UH-1D

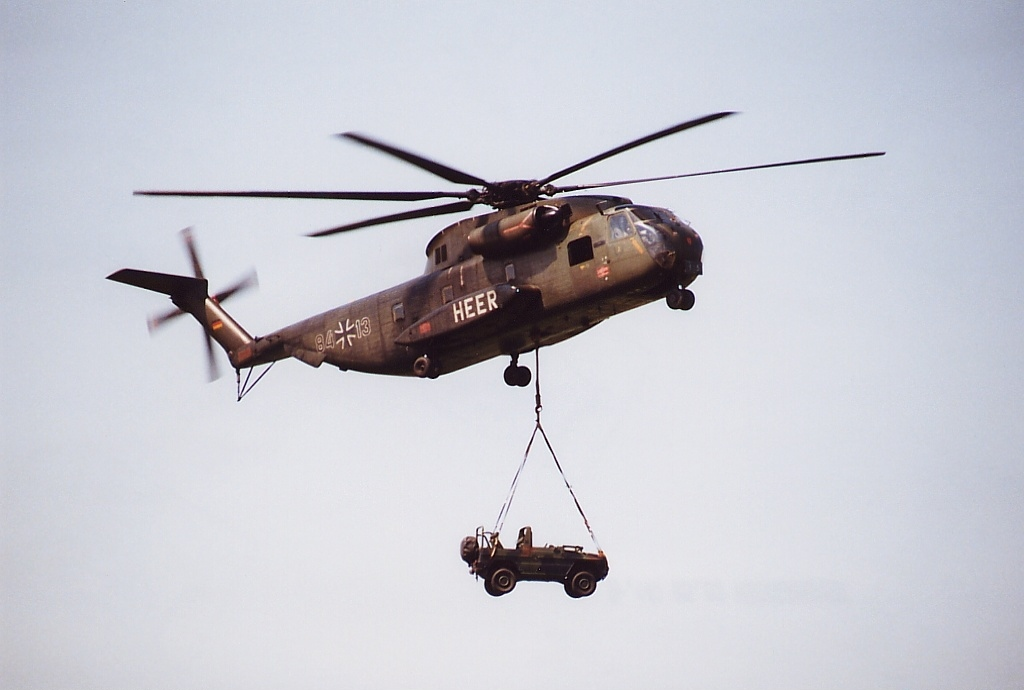
Sikorsky CH-53G

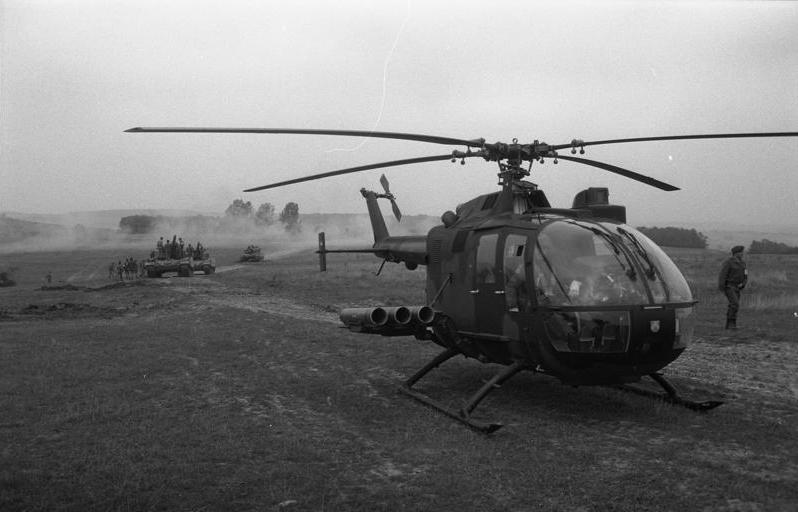
Bölkow Bo 105P

== Post 1990 ==
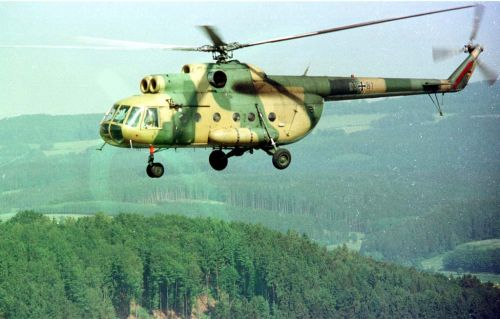
Mil Mi-8

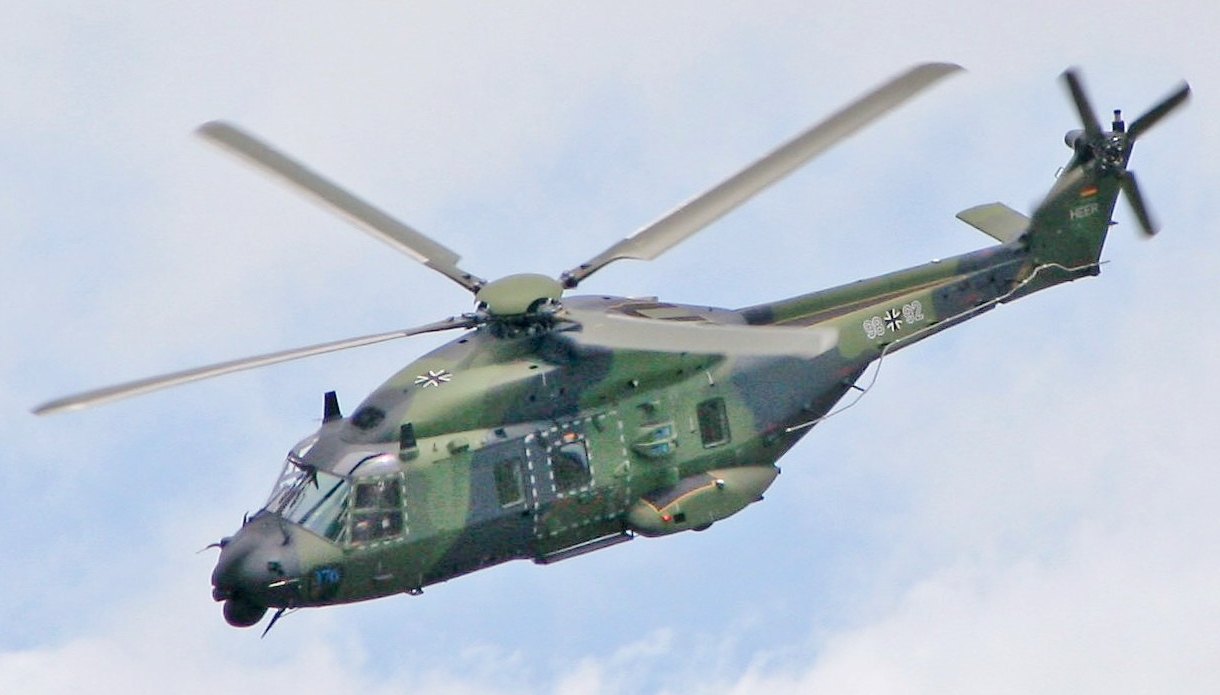
LTH NATO-HELICOPTER 90

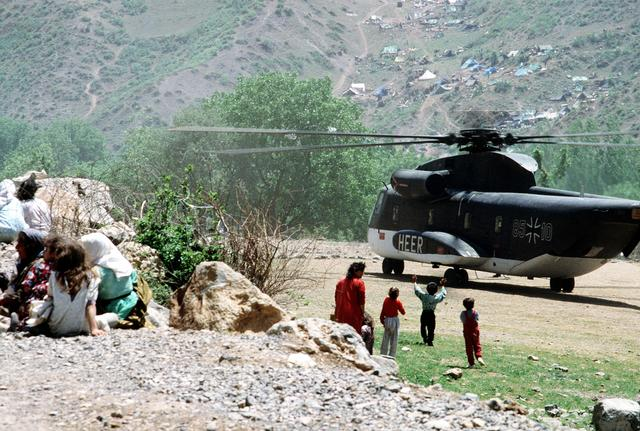
Kurdish refugee children run toward a CH-53G helicopter of the German Army Aviation Corps in Northern Iraq in 1991

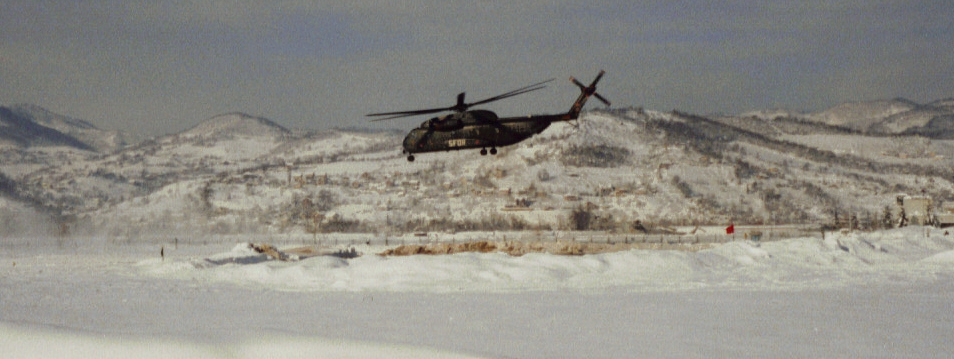
A CH-53G helicopter of the German Army Aviation Corps near Sarajevo in 1999

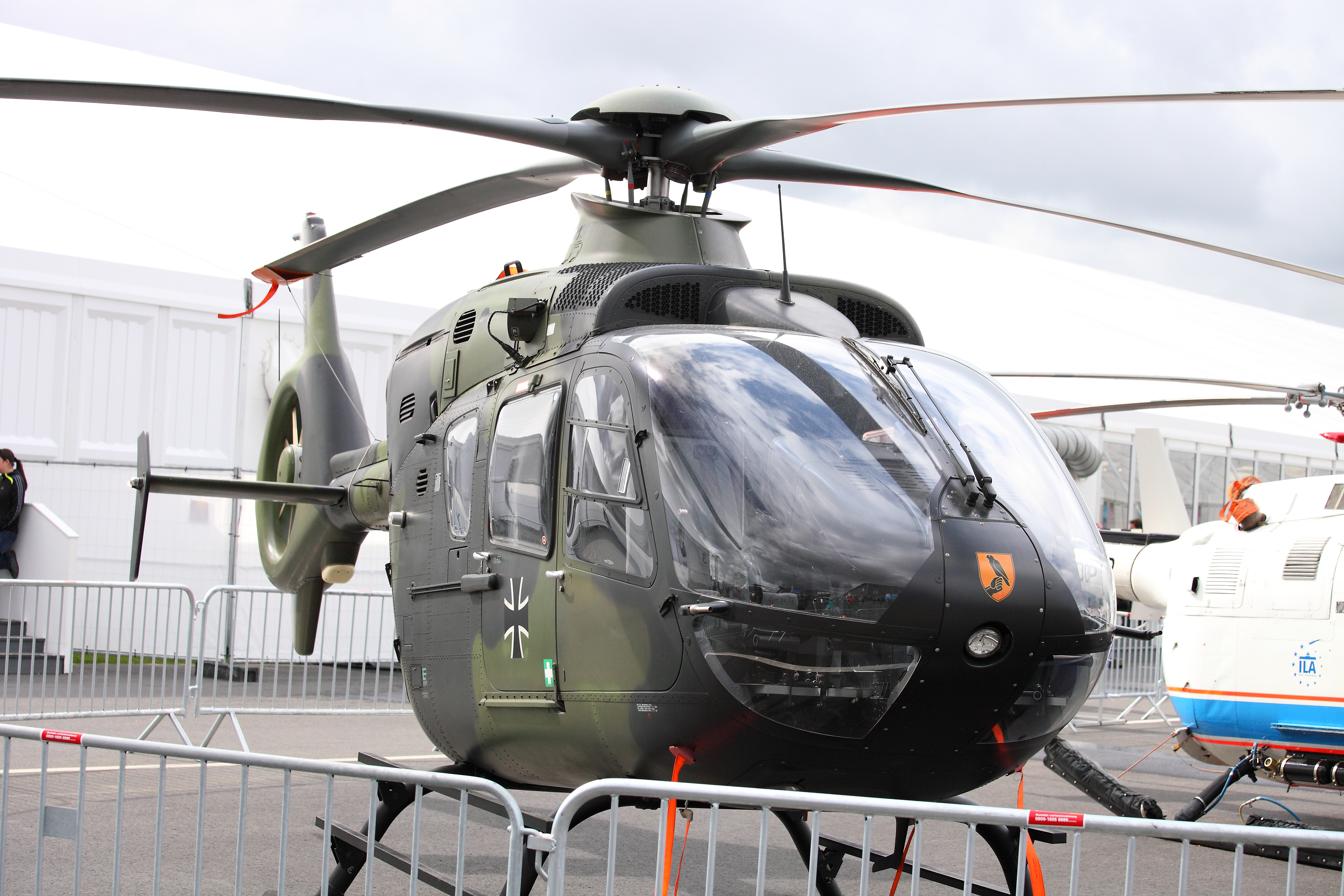
Eurocopter EC 135

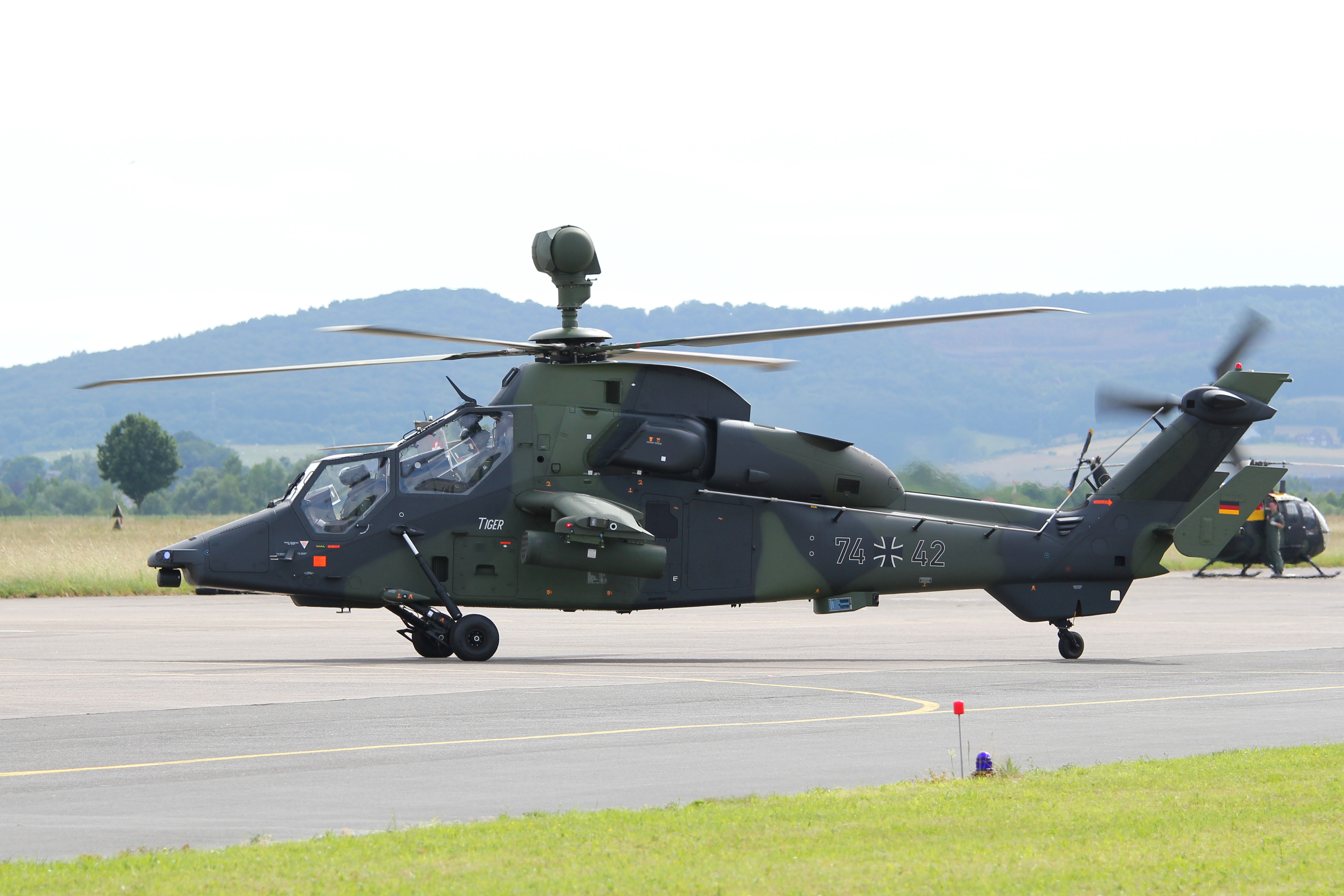
PAH-2 Tiger UHT

Following the German reunification (3 October 1990), 3rd and 5th wing of the East German Airforce, part of the National People's Army (NVA), became 70th, 80th and East Squadron of the German Army Aviation Corps. During a transitional period, German Army Aviation Corps flew Soviet-built Mil Mi-8 helicopters. The Mil Mi-24 fleet, however, was no longer used and subsequently sold off.

In 1991, German Army Aviation Corps helicopters provided humanitarian aid to Kurdish refugees in northern Iraq.

From October 1991 onwards, Sikorsky CH-53G of the German Army Aviation Corps provided the means of transport for UN weapons inspectors in Iraq.

In 1993 and 1994, in Somalia, Bell UH-1D helicopters equipped with machine-guns were used for the first time in earnest as a means for self-protection.

On 1 April 1994, the German Army Aviation Corps Brigade 10 was established. This brigade united all German Army Aviation Corps transport helicopter units under one leadership. The reconnaissance and liaison units were also integrated into this brigade.

In December 1995, German Army Aviation Corps became part of IFOR contingent, later to be renamed SFOR, in the former Yugoslavia, flying missions into the most remote mountainous regions. In 2004, NATO handed over the command of SFOR to the EU. The name of the mission changed then to EUFOR.

During civil unrest in Albania in March 1997, the German Army Aviation Corps flew several missions into Albania in order to evacuate foreign citizens.

On 3 April 1997, a new brigade was established, Air-Motorised Brigade 1, combining several German Army Aviation Corps forces into one unit, in order to create more rapidity in response, flexibility and fighting power.

During flooding in July and August 1997, the dikes along the river Oder in Mecklenburg-Vorpommern were on the verge of collapsing. The German Army Aviation Corps flew numerous mission in order to save the dikes and the population.

In February 1999, following a devastating avalanche in Galtür in Austria, ten helicopters of the German Army Aviation Corps took part in evacuation missions as part of the international aid effort.

In March 1999, German Army Aviation Corps' mission in Kosovo began when the first base was established in Macedonia. The helicopters were part of KFOR. Later that year, the unit was transferred to Kosovo proper.

On 9 September 1999, the new helicopter LTH NATO-Helicopter 90 was presented to the public at the German Army Aviation School in Bückeburg. Delivery to active units is planned to be taking place from the second half of 2006 onwards, after the manufacturer, NH Industries, encountered several problems causing a delay in production.

On 13 September 1999, the first Eurocopter EC 135 was brought into action as a training helicopter, eventually to supersede the Alouette II. The last flight of a German Army Aviation Corps' Alouette II took place early in 2006.

On 14 December 1999, an improved version of the CH-53G, the CH-53GS, was introduced, easily recognisable because of their large pair of auxiliary fuel tanks.

During the flooding of the river Elbe in 2002, the German Army Aviation Corps flew countless missions in order to rescue people, strengthening the crumbling dikes and flying in supplies into areas cut off by the high waters.

Beginning with the transfer of four helicopters to Kabul in Afghanistan in April 2002, the German Army Aviation Corps' mission as part of ISAF started, the units either being based in Afghanistan proper or in neighbouring Uzbekistan at the air base of Termez. In November 2007 the helicopters moved their base to Mazari Sharif.

Towards then end of 2003, the first Eurocopter Tiger helicopters were delivered for testing and evaluation purposes to the German Army's Office of Defense Technology and Procurement.

In 2005, Eurocopter Tigers were delivered to the Franco-German Training Centre in Le Luc where the initial pilot training scheme takes place. Delivery to combat units is expected to take place in the second half of 2006. German Army Aviation Corps Attack Helicopter Regiment 26 Franken based in Roth Air Base is to be equipped with the Eurocopter Tiger as well as German Army Aviation Corps Attack Helicopter Regiment 36 based in Fritzlar.

During yet another flooding of the river Elbe in April 2006, the German Army Aviation Corps again contributed to the aid of the population by flying numerous SAR missions.

Helicopters of the German Army Aviation Corps were part of EUFOR RD Congo in support of UN mission MONUC to monitor the general elections in the Democratic Republic of the Congo. This mission lasted from June 2006 and ended with the last soldiers returning in December of the same year.

In August 2007 helicopters of the German Army Aviation Corps were part of the international force assisting the Greek authorities in fighting the catastrophic forest fires on the Peloponnese.

In October 2011 the German Federal Ministry of Defence announced a reorganisation/reduction of the German Armed Forces. As a consequence, the strength of Germany Army Aviation Corps will be reduced. Flying and training operations at Altenstadt, Rheine Air Base, Celle Air Base and Roth Air Base will cease to exist and the respective army aviation units stationed at these air bases disbanded. Medium Transport Helicopter Regiment 25, based at Laupheim Air Base disbanded on 31 December 2012 and was re-established as Helicopter Wing 64 of the German Air Force on 1 January 2013. At the same time 2nd Squadron of the air force's Air Transport Wing 61, flying helicopters of the type Bell UH-1D, became part of the Germany Army Aviation Corps.

== See also ==
- Army aviation
- Bundeswehr
- List of air forces
