= Altenstadt Air Base =

German Army air base at Altenstadt

Altenstadt Air Base Heeresflugplatz Altenstadt
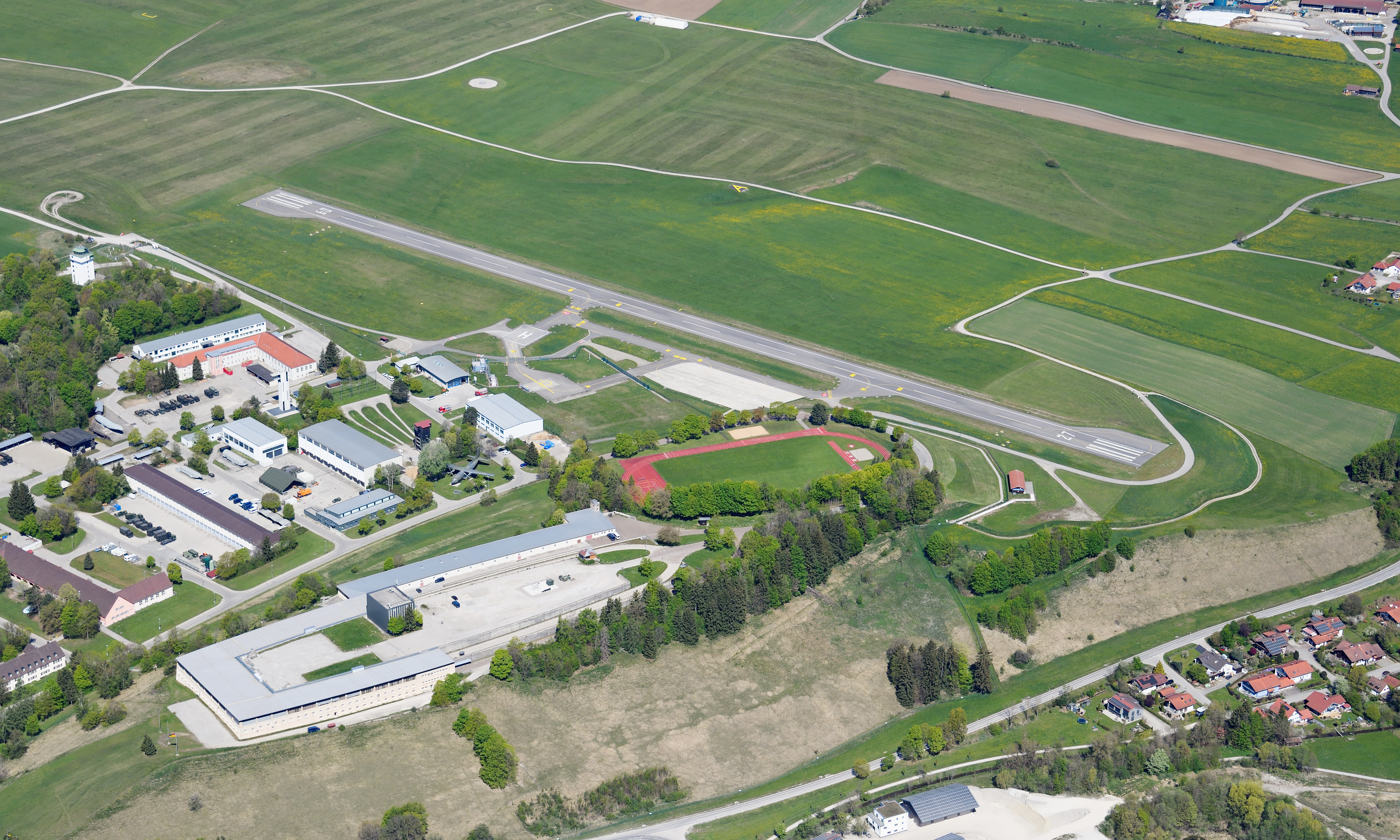
- IATA: none; ICAO: ETHA

Summary
- Airport type: Military
- Owner: Federal Ministry of Defence
- Operator: German Army
- Location: Altenstadt
- Commander: Colonel Ferdinand Baur
- Elevation AMSL: 2,424 ft (739 m)
- Coordinates: 47°50′6″N 10°52′16″E
- Interactive map of Altenstadt Air Base

Runways
Direction	Length		Surface
Direction	m	ft	Surface
09/27	700	2,296	Asphalt

Altenstadt Air Base (German: Heeresflugplatz Altenstadt, ICAO: ETHA) is an air base approximately 1.3 kilometres (0.81 mi) northeast of the Upper Bavarian municipality of Altenstadt, Bavaria, Germany. It is operated by the German Army Aviation Corps.

== History ==
During World War II the airfield was used as a training centre for Anti-aircraft warfare.

Following the foundation of the German Armed Forces (Bundeswehr) in 1955 a training school for airborne troops was established at Altenstadt Air Base in 1956. In June 1993, the base was officially named Franz Josef Strauss Barracks after the former prime minister of Bavaria, who had served on the air base during World War II as an "officer for military spiritual guidance" (Offizier für wehrgeistige Führung). Since 1997 the school has been twinned with the French Army's École des troupes aéroportées (ETAP) in Pau.

== Current use ==
Altenstadt Air Base is home of the German Army's School for Airborne Troops as well as a Bundeswehr Sports Promotion Section. Also stationed at the air base are parts of the Central Medical Services. Approximately 720 military personnel are employed at the air base.

In October 2011 the German Federal Ministry of Defence announced a reorganisation/reduction of the German Armed Forces. As a consequence, the School for Airborne Troops will be disbanded and the Bundeswehr Sports Promotion Section will be relocated to Oldenburg. The Central Medical Services will be expanded into a regional medical centre. Additionally, a battalion of aspirant non-commissioned officers will be based at Altenstadt Air Base. However, after the implementation of these cuts and relocations, the number of military personnel based at Altenstadt Air Base will be reduced by almost 75 per cent to 190.

In 2012 the Bavarian Office for Cultural Heritage Management announced that several buildings within the air base, by now in the possession of the Institute for Federal Real Estate, are to be listed. This includes amongst others the mess, the guardhouse and barracks.

== See also ==
- History of the German Army Aviation Corps
- List of airports in Germany
