= Roth Air Base =

Roth Air Base Heeresflugplatz Roth
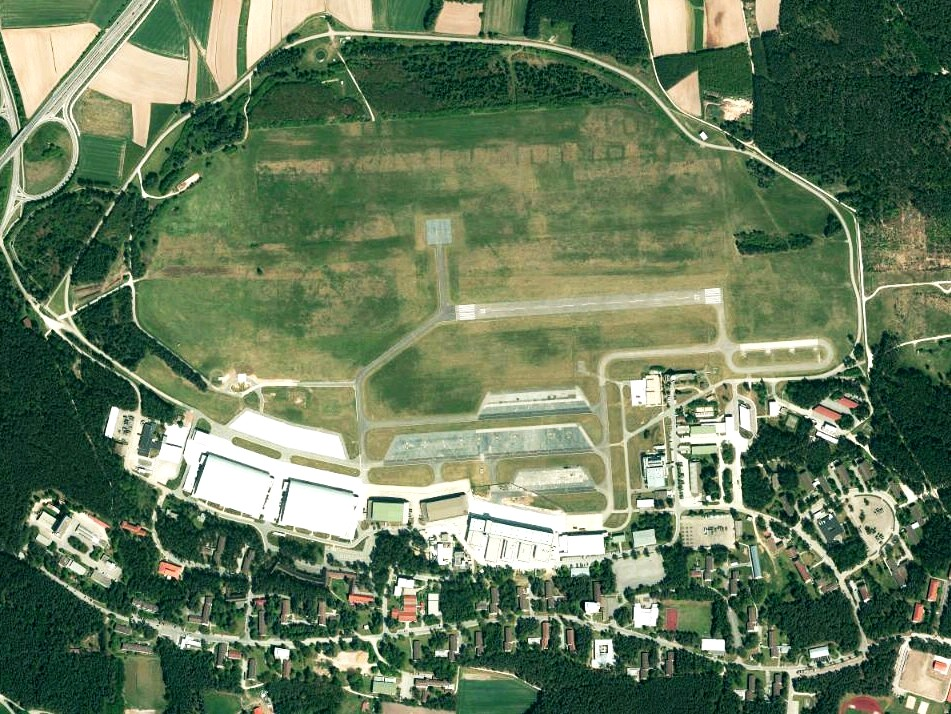
- IATA: none; ICAO: ETHR

Summary
- Airport type: Military
- Owner: Federal Ministry of Defence
- Operator: German Army
- Location: Roth
- Built: 1938
- In use: 1938-1945, 1954-present
- Commander: Colonel Bodo Schütte
- Occupants: German Army Aviation Corps
- Elevation AMSL: 1,271 ft / 387 m
- Coordinates: 49°13′05″N 011°06′01″E
- Interactive map of Roth Air Base

Runways
Direction	Length		Surface
Direction	m	ft	Surface
09/27	535	1,755	Asphalt

Roth Air Base (German: Heeresflugplatz Roth, ICAO: ETHR) is located 4 kilometres (2.5 mi) south of the city of Roth in Bavaria, Germany.

== History ==
Planning for a base for the nascent Luftwaffe near Roth started in the mid-1930s. Building works not only for an air base but also for regular barracks started in 1937 and were completed in 1938. The first unit to occupy the base was a pilot training school relocated from Landsberg Air Base near Penzing.

During World War II, a number of Luftwaffe fighter wings were stationed at Roth. In 1945 the airfield was bombed by aircraft of the United States Army Air Forces and surrendered to American forces on 8 April 1945. Subsequently, the base was used as storage facility for ammunition and bombs.

In 1954 Roth's Amateur Pilot Club received permission to use the airstrip. This permission has never been revoked and is still valid.

In 1956 the air base was handed over by the U.S. to the Luftwaffe, which used it for the basic training of its recruits. In 1961 it was transferred to the German Army which utilised the facilities to house units of its Army Aviation Corps on the base, extending and improving the already existing structures. The first aircraft to be stationed at Roth Air Base were Alouette II and Do 27 and in 1963 Army Aviation Battalion 4 was founded at Roth. In the same year, the air base was given the name Otto Lilienthal Barracks after the pioneer of human aviation. After the phasing out of the Do 27, the battalion received helicopters of the type Bell UH-1D in 1969. During the following decade a number of German Army Aviation Corps' units were stationed at Roth Air Base only to be relocated within a few years or to be renamed.

In 1980 Army Aviation Regiment 26 received helicopters of the type Bo 105 and in 2004 the regiment was renamed Army Aviation Attack Helicopter Regiment 26 and was given the honorary name Franken (i.e. Franconia), this being a result of the German Army's continuing commitment to the base at the time.

Beginning in 2009 Army Aviation Attack Helicopter Regiment 26 was to receive 32 helicopters of the type Eurocopter Tiger, replacing the Bo 105. In order to accommodate this new helicopter, extensive construction works to build two hangars for storage and maintenance had started in 2007 and were completed in 2009. However, due to technical problems, the deliveries were delayed and ultimately did not take place.

Even though Army Aviation Attack Helicopter Regiment 26 is the air base's main occupant, small units of other parts of the armed forces are also stationed at this location, namely Army Aviation Squadron 269, two squadrons of the Luftwaffe's Air Defence Artillery Group 23 equipped with Patriot surface-to-air missiles, parts of the Luftwaffe's Training Regiment and its staff, and also parts of Central Medical Services.

Approximately 2,800 military and civilian personnel are currently employed at Roth Air Base.

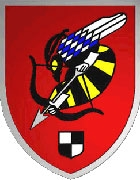
Coat of arms of Army Aviation Regiment 26

In October 2011 the German Federal Ministry of Defence announced a reorganisation/reduction of the German Armed Forces. As a consequence, Army Aviation Attack Helicopter Regiment 26 and auxiliary units as well the two squadrons of the Luftwaffe's Air Defence Artillery Group 23 and the Luftwaffe's Training Regiment will be disbanded. The Luftwaffe's Officers Training School will relocate from Fürstenfeldbruck Air Base to Roth. The Central Medical Services will be expanded into a regional medical centre. Additionally, a regiment of Feldjäger (Military Police) will also be moved to Roth. However, after the implementation of these cuts and relocation the number of military personnel based at Roth Air Base will be reduced by more than 80 per cent to 540. With the relocation of the last attack helicopters in 2014, military flying operations at Roth Air Base will cease to exist. On the 15th of October 2025, the Officers Training School moved to Roth and the Campus was named "Kuebart-Campus", after the former inspector of the German air force.

== See also ==
- German Army Aviation Corps
- History of the German Army Aviation Corps
- German Army
- Army Aviation
- Eurocopter Tiger
