= Aaron of Neustadt =

Austrian Talmudist

- Born: Aaron Blümlein
- Died: 13 March 1421; Vienna, Duchy of Austria
- Occupation: Talmudist

Aaron Blümlein (Hebrew: אהרן בלומלין; died 13 March 1421), known as Aaron of Neustadt, was an Austrian Talmudist who studied with Shallom of Neustadt and Jaekel of Vienna formed a triumvirate of Talmudic scholars in Austria at the end of the fourteenth and beginning of the fifteenth century. He was the uncle and chief instructor of Israel Isserlein, who frequently alludes in his works to the decisions and opinions of his teacher. Jacob Mölln (Maharil) also refers to him and his colleagues. Aaron suffered the death of a martyr, at Vienna, on 13 March 1421. He wrote a digest, Hilkot Niddah, which is mentioned by Isserlein. A collection of sermons by Aaron is now known only through three citations in the works of Jacob Mölln and of Isserlein.
