= Wilhelm Crinius =

German World War II fighter pilot

- Crinius as a Leutnant
- Born: 2 December 1920; Hohenhausen in Kalletal
- Died: 26 April 1997 (aged 76); Stuhr-Fahrenhorst
- Military career
- Allegiance: Nazi Germany
- Branch: Luftwaffe
- Service years: 1939–1945
- Rank: Leutnant (second lieutenant)
- Unit: JG 53
- Conflicts: World War II: Siege of Malta (1940); Eastern Front; North African Campaign
- Awards: Knight's Cross of the Iron Cross with Oak Leaves
- Other work: Senior manager, private industry

Wilhelm Crinius (2 December 1920 – 26 April 1997) was a Luftwaffe fighter ace during World War II. A flying ace or fighter ace is a military aviator credited with shooting down five or more enemy aircraft during aerial combat. Crinius is credited with 114 aerial victories claimed in approximately 400 combat missions. He recorded 100 victories over the Eastern Front. Of his 14 victories claimed over the Western Front, one was a four-engined bomber. On 23 September 1942, Crinius became the only German fighter pilot to be awarded the Knight's Cross of the Iron Cross and the Knight's Cross of the Iron Cross with Oak Leaves simultaneously.

== Early life and career ==
Wilhelm Crinius was born in Hohenhausen, Kalletal on 2 December 1920. His father, also named Wilhelm, was a master craftsman and house painter and decorator, his mother née Tölle. Crinius attended the Volksschule, a primary school, in Hohenhausen from 1927 until 1935. In 1935 he started his merchant apprenticeship at the savings and loans bank in Hohenhausen. Parallel to his apprenticeship, he attended the vocational school. He worked at the saving and loans bank in Hohenhausen as an employee from Easter 1938 until November 1938.

In the summer of 1939, Crinus served in the compulsory labour service (Reichsarbeitsdienst), working in a construction unit on the Westwall, a fortified defensive line on Germany's western border. In January 1940, Crinius joined the Luftwaffe and was trained as a pilot. (Note: Flight training in the Luftwaffe progressed through the levels A1, A2 and B1, B2, referred to as A/B flight training. A training included theoretical and practical training in aerobatics, navigation, long-distance flights and dead-stick landings. The B courses included high-altitude flights, instrument flights, night landings and training to handle the aircraft in difficult situations.)

== World War II ==
In February 1942, Gefreiter (lance corporal) Crinius was posted to 3. Staffel (3rd squadron) of Jagdgeschwader 53 (JG 53—53rd Fighter Wing) based in Sicily. (Note: For an explanation of Luftwaffe unit designations see Organization of the Luftwaffe during World War II.) In March and April 1942, he flew 60 missions over Malta. On 1 April, he was promoted to Unteroffizier (non-commissioned officer). In May 1942, I./JG 53 was transferred to the Eastern Front near Kursk. Crinius achieved his first victories on 9 June when he shot down two Il-2 Sturmoviks. On 8 July, Crinius shot down two Douglas Boston bombers west of Voronezh, although his aircraft was hit by Russian anti-aircraft fire and he was forced to belly-landed his Messerschmitt Bf 109 F-4 (Werknummer 10243—factory number) between the enemy lines, where he was rescued by a German patrol and safely returned to his unit.

In July 1942, I./JG 53 was sent to the southern sector of the Eastern Front, where Crinius claimed his 15th kill on 1 August. He claimed his 24th victory on 11 August 1942. The next day I./JG 53 relocated from Bereska to Tusov, closer to the front and Crinius shot down three Mikoyan-Gurevich MiG-3s, bringing his total to 27 victories. Crinius recorded his 49th victory on 27 August which was also the 1,000th victory for I. Gruppe (1st group) of JG 53. After his 55th victory on 1 September he was promoted to Feldwebel (Sergeant). Hereafter Crinius was particularly successful, claiming some 40 victories in August and 46 victories in the timeframe 1–22 September, including his 100th on 22 September. He was the 22nd Luftwaffe pilot to achieve the century mark.

Together with Friedrich-Karl Müller, Crinius was awarded the Knight's Cross of the Iron Cross with Oak Leaves (Ritterkreuz des Eisernen Kreuzes mit Eichenlaub) on 23 September 1942. Crinius was awarded the Oak Leaves the same day he was awarded the Knight's Cross of the Iron Cross (Ritterkreuz des Eisernen Kreuzes). In consequence, Crinius travelled to the presentation ceremony wearing a makeshift Knight's Cross made from an Iron Cross second Class. He was the 127th member of the German armed forces to be so honored. The presentation was made by Adolf Hitler in October at the Führerhauptquartier Werwolf, Hitler's headquarters located in a pine forest about 12 kilometres (7.5 mi) north of Vinnytsia, in Ukraine. Three other Luftwaffe officers were presented with the Oak Leaves that day by Hitler, Oberleutnant Müller, Oberleutnant Wolfgang Tonne and Leutant Hans Beißwenger. Crinius was promoted to Leutnant der Reserve (second lieutenant of the reserves) on 1 October 1942. Following the presentation, Müller, Tonne and Crinius were ordered to Berlin where they made a propaganda appearance at the "House of the Press". At the same time, I. Gruppe of JG 53 relocated from the Eastern Front to Comiso Airfiled in Sicily where they arrived on 10 October.

In November 1942, Crinius relocated with I./JG 53 to Tunisia. In Africa, Crinius claimed another 14 victories, including a B-17 Flying Fortress on 26 December 1942 over Bizerte. On 13 January 1943, he engaged in aerial combat with Royal Air Force (RAF) Supermarine Spitfire fighters near El Kala, Crinius' aircraft was hit and he was wounded in the thigh. Breaking off combat, he headed for his base but his engine then caught fire. He ditched his damaged Bf 109 G-2 (Werknummer 10805) in the sea. He spent 24 hours in the water before being rescued by French sailors and Arabs. After hospitalisation for his wounds, Crinius became a prisoner of war.

== Later life ==
After World War II, Wilhelm Crinius worked in private industry, serving as a director in the German branch of the Dutch Philips GmbH. He was appointed chairman of the board of directors of the Ernst Düllmann GmbH in 1971. On 18 June 1989, as a pensioner, Crinius ran for the European Parliament in Hesse as candidate for the right-wing German People's Union (Deutsche Volksunion). He died on 26 April 1997 in Stuhr-Fahrenhorst, Lower Saxony.

== Summary of career ==
=== Aerial victory claims ===
According to US historian David T. Zabecki, Crinius was credited with 114 aerial victories. Mathews and Foreman, authors of Luftwaffe Aces — Biographies and Victory Claims, researched the German Federal Archives and found records for 114 aerial victory claims. This figure includes 100 aerial victories on the Eastern Front and 14 over the Western Allies, including one four-engined bomber.

Victory claims were logged to a map-reference (PQ = Planquadrat), for example "PQ 39242". The Luftwaffe grid map (Jägermeldenetz) covered all of Europe, western Russia and North Africa and was composed of rectangles measuring 15 minutes of latitude by 30 minutes of longitude, an area of about 360 square miles (930 km^{2}). These sectors were then subdivided into 36 smaller units to give a location area 3 km × 4 km (1.9 mi × 2.5 mi) in size.

Chronicle of aerial victories
This and the – (dash) indicates unconfirmed aerial victory claims for which Crinius did not receive credit. This and the ? (question mark) indicates information discrepancies listed by Prien, Stemmer, Rodeike, Bock, Mathews and Foreman.
Claim	Date	Time	Type	Location	Claim	Date	Time	Type	Location
– 3. Staffel of Jagdgeschwader 53 – Eastern Front — 28 May 1942 – 27 September 1942
1	9 June 1942	17:25	Il-2		51	28 August 1942	14:41	LaGG-3	PQ 50792; 80 km (50 mi) east-northeast of Stalingrad
2	9 June 1942	17:30	Il-2		52	28 August 1942	14:44	LaGG-3	PQ 50792; 80 km (50 mi) east-northeast of Stalingrad
3	21 June 1942	19:10	LaGG-3		53	30 August 1942	05:27	MiG-3	PQ 4921; 15 km (9.3 mi) northeast of Grebenka
4	23 June 1942	18:20	LaGG-3		54	30 August 1942	05:31	MiG-3	PQ 4921; 15 km (9.3 mi) northeast of Grebenka
5	23 June 1942	18:40	R-5 vicinity of Yelets		55	1 September 1942	07:43	Pe-2	PQ 4935; 15 km (9.3 mi) south of Bassargino
6	23 June 1942	19:10	MiG-3		56	2 September 1942	09:43	P-40	PQ 4948; 35 km (22 mi) southeast of Stalingrad
7	28 June 1942	18:30	R-10 (Seversky)		57	2 September 1942	12:17? (Note: According to Mathews and Foreman claimed at 12:32.)	LaGG-3	PQ 4921; 15 km (9.3 mi) northeast of Grebenka
8	28 June 1942	18:33	R-10 (Seversky)	north of Tschurnawa	58	2 September 1942	12:35	LaGG-3	PQ 4923; 35 km (22 mi) east-northeast of Stalingrad
9	3 July 1942	18:42	P-39	south of Walinow	59	2 September 1942	15:23	P-40	PQ 4933 vicinity of Stalingrad
10	3 July 1942	18:53	P-39	Kriwonka	60	3 September 1942	14:12	La-5	PQ 4942; 30 km (19 mi) east-southeast of Stalingrad
11	5 July 1942	07:55	MiG-3	east of Voronezh	61	4 September 1942	05:12? (Note: According to Mathews and Foreman claimed at 05:18.)	Yak-1	PQ 4992; 65 km (40 mi) east of Stalingrad
12	8 July 1942	04:50	Boston		62	4 September 1942	10:25? (Note: According to Mathews and Foreman claimed at 10:35.)	Yak-1	PQ 4923; 35 km (22 mi) east-northeast of Stalingrad
13	8 July 1942	08:50? (Note: According to Mathews and Foreman claimed at 04:46.)	Boston	east of Podgonnoje	63	4 September 1942	13:20	LaGG-3	PQ 49251; 25 km (16 mi) east of Stalingrad
14	27 July 1942	17:40	R-5	PQ 1761	64	5 September 1942	13:20	Yak-1	PQ 49274; 10 km (6.2 mi) east of Stalingrad
15	1 August 1942	14:19	LaGG-3	PQ 3941; 10 km (6.2 mi) southeast of Kalach	65	5 September 1942	13:22? (Note: According to Mathews and Foreman claimed at 13:23.)	Yak-1	PQ 49283; 25 km (16 mi) east of Stalingrad
16	3 August 1942	10:54	Il-2	PQ 3919 vicinity of Kalach	66	6 September 1942	13:31	Yak-1	PQ 4912; 10 km (6.2 mi) north of Gumrak
17	3 August 1942	10:57	Il-2	PQ 3919 vicinity of Kalach	67	6 September 1942	13:32	Yak-1	PQ 4912; 10 km (6.2 mi) north of Gumrak
18	3 August 1942	11:03	Il-2	PQ 3927 vicinity of Kalach	68	6 September 1942	13:33	Yak-1	PQ 4912; 10 km (6.2 mi) north of Gumrak
19	5 August 1942	09:36	Il-2	PQ 4971; 20 km (12 mi) northeast of Aksay	69	6 September 1942	13:57	LaGG-3	PQ 5992; 65 km (40 mi) east of Stalingrad
20	6 August 1942	08:47	R-5	PQ 3965; 35 km (22 mi) north of Shutow	70	7 September 1942	05:23? (Note: According to Mathews and Foreman claimed at 05:28.)	La-5	PQ 4925; 25 km (16 mi) east of Grebenka
21	6 August 1942	16:40	Il-2	PQ 4958; 35 km (22 mi) northeast of Aksay	71	7 September 1942	13:35? (Note: According to Mathews and Foreman claimed at 13:27.)	Il-2	PQ 4925; 25 km (16 mi) east of Grebenka
22	8 August 1942	06:00	Il-2	PQ 4961; 35 km (22 mi) south-southeast of Stalingrad	72	7 September 1942	16:45	Il-2	PQ 49274; 10 km (6.2 mi) east of Stalingrad
23	8 August 1942	12:01	MiG-3	PQ 3945; 30 km (19 mi) southeast of Kalach	73	7 September 1942	16:49	Il-2? (Note: According to Mathews and Foreman claimed as a Petlyakov Pe-2.)	PQ 4925; 25 km (16 mi) east of Grebenka
24	9 August 1942	18:26	Il-2	PQ 3947; 30 km (19 mi) south-southeast of Kalach	74	8 September 1942	10:20	Il-2	PQ 4916 vicinity of Grebenka
25	12 August 1942	04:23	MiG-3	PQ 39714; 20 km (12 mi) north-northwest of Kotelnikovo	75	8 September 1942	10:27	Yak-1	PQ 4924; 10 km (6.2 mi) east of Grebenka
26	12 August 1942	04:24	MiG-3	PQ 39711 vicinity of Shutow	76	9 September 1942	10:17? (Note: According to Mathews and Foreman claimed at 10:37.)	LaGG-3	PQ 4924; 10 km (6.2 mi) east of Grebenka
27	12 August 1942	04:34	Il-2	PQ 3959; 30 km (19 mi) southeast of Nizhny Chir	77	9 September 1942	10:45	Yak-1	PQ 4059; 45 km (28 mi) east of Grebenka
28	13 August 1942	10:14	LaGG-3	PQ 49422; 25 km (16 mi) east of Stalingrad	78	9 September 1942	10:48	Yak-1	PQ 4059; 45 km (28 mi) east of Grebenka
29	13 August 1942	16:35	LaGG-3	PQ 3942; 20 km (12 mi) east-southeast of Kalach	79	10 September 1942	06:15	Yak-1	PQ 4927; 15 km (9.3 mi) east of Stalingrad
30	13 August 1942	17:55	LaGG-3	PQ 3942; 20 km (12 mi) east-southeast of Kalach	80	10 September 1942	06:19	Yak-1	PQ 4925; 25 km (16 mi) east of Grebenka
31? (Note: This claim is not listed by Mathews and Foreman.)	14 August 1942	04:44	R-5		81	10 September 1942	14:10	LaGG-3	PQ 4947; 30 km (19 mi) east-southeast of Stalingrad
32	14 August 1942	14:15	Il-2		82	11 September 1942	11:40	LaGG-3	PQ 4079; 15 km (9.3 mi) north of Grebenka
33	15 August 1942	11:43? (Note: According to Mathews and Foreman claimed at 11:42.)	LaGG-3	PQ 4943; 40 km (25 mi) east-southeast of Stalingrad	83	11 September 1942	11:45	Yak-1	PQ 4087; 20 km (12 mi) north-northeast of Stalingrad
34	16 August 1942	06:10	MiG-3	PQ 4921; 15 km (9.3 mi) northeast of Grebenka	84	11 September 1942	14:27? (Note: According to Mathews and Foreman claimed at 14:33.)	Yak-1	PQ 4079
35	17 August 1942	15:45? (Note: According to Mathews and Foreman claimed at 15:48.)	R-5	PQ 49263; 35 km (22 mi) east of Stalingrad	85	15 September 1942	14:52? (Note: According to Mathews and Foreman claimed at 14:02.)	La-5	15 km (9.3 mi) southeast of Stalingrad
36	18 August 1942	08:05	R-5	PQ 49253; 25 km (16 mi) east of Stalingrad	86	16 September 1942	12:05? (Note: According to Mathews and Foreman claimed at 14:05.)	LaGG-3	PQ 49422
37	19 August 1942	15:25	Boston	PQ 59173; 45 km (28 mi) east of Stalingrad	87	17 September 1942	09:46	Yak-1	PQ 4075; 30 km (19 mi) north of Gumrak
38	19 August 1942	15:28	Il-2	PQ 59173; 45 km (28 mi) east of Stalingrad	88	17 September 1942	09:48	Yak-1	PQ 4076; 25 km (16 mi) north of Grebenka
39	20 August 1942	04:26	LaGG-3	PQ 49533; 25 km (16 mi) north of Grebenka	89	17 September 1942	09:51	Yak-1	PQ 4076; 25 km (16 mi) north of Grebenka
40	20 August 1942	04:49? (Note: According to Mathews and Foreman claimed at 04:47.)	Er-2	PQ 4078; 20 km (12 mi) north of Gumrak	90	17 September 1942	14:48	Yak-1	PQ 40731; 35 km (22 mi) north of Grebenka
41	21 August 1942	13:17	Boston	PQ 5077; 50 km (31 mi) northeast of Stalingrad	91	19 September 1942	07:08	Yak-1	PQ 49124; 15 km (9.3 mi) north of Gumrak
42	23 August 1942	10:14	U-2	PQ 49223; 25 km (16 mi) northeast of Stalingrad	92	19 September 1942	07:11	Yak-1	PQ 49122; 15 km (9.3 mi) north of Gumrak
43	23 August 1942	10:22	R-5	PQ 4927; 15 km (9.3 mi) east of Stalingrad	93	20 September 1942	07:15	Yak-1	PQ 49291; 35 km (22 mi) east of Stalingrad
44	23 August 1942	12:50	I-180 (Yak-7)	PQ 4916 vicinity of Grebenka	94	20 September 1942	09:56	Yak-1	PQ 40761; 25 km (16 mi) north of Grebenka
45	23 August 1942	16:22	MiG-3	PQ 4924; 10 km (6.2 mi) east of Grebenka	95	20 September 1942	09:58	Yak-1	PQ 4076; 25 km (16 mi) north of Grebenka
46	24 August 1942	06:13	MiG-3	PQ 5914; 45 km (28 mi) east-northeast of Stalingrad	96	20 September 1942	16:10	LaGG-3	PQ 5911
47	24 August 1942	06:17	MiG-3	PQ 5915; 60 km (37 mi) east-northeast of Stalingrad	97	21 September 1942	06:07	Pe-2	PQ 49241; 10 km (6.2 mi) northeast of Stalingrad
48	26 August 1942	08:24	MiG-3	PQ 4916 vicinity of Grebenka	98	21 September 1942	17:15	Yak-1	PQ 40792; 15 km (9.3 mi) north of Grebenka
— (Note: This claim is by Mathews and Foreman, but not by Prien, Stemmer, Rodeike and Bock.)	27 August 1942	11:15	MiG-3	15 km (9.3 mi) southeast of Stalingrad	99	21 September 1942	17:16	Yak-1	PQ 40792; 15 km (9.3 mi) north of Grebenka
49	27 August 1942	17:35	Yak-4	PQ 4911; 15 km (9.3 mi) north-northeast of Pitomnik	100	22 September 1942	06:45	Yak-1	PQ 49132 south of Akhtuba
50	28 August 1942	08:12	P-40	PQ 4943; 40 km (25 mi) east-southeast of Stalingrad					
– 3. Staffel of Jagdgeschwader 53 – Mediterranean Theater — 1 October – 31 December 1942
101	1 December 1942	16:34	Spitfire	15 km (9.3 mi) south of Cap Scaramia	105	26 December 1942	13:28	B-17	Bizerte
102	1 December 1942	16:38	Spitfire	25 km (16 mi) south of Cap Scaramia	106	28 December 1942	14:07	Spitfire	5 km (3.1 mi) south of Souk El Arba
103	18 December 1942	11:55	P-38	south of Tunis	107	29 December 1942	14:35	Spitfire	10 km (6.2 mi) east-northeast of Bône
104	18 December 1942	11:56	P-38	south of Tunis					
– 3. Staffel of Jagdgeschwader 53 – North Africa — 1 January – May 1943
108	1 January 1943	11:15	Spitfire	15 km (9.3 mi) southeast of Bône	112	7 January 1943	15:03	Spitfire	PQ 03 Ost 8582
109	1 January 1943	15:54	Spitfire	15 km (9.3 mi) south-southwest of Bône	113	8 January 1943	13:45	P-38	15 km (9.3 mi) northeast of Béja
110	4 January 1943	10:36	Boston	2 km (1.2 mi) southwest of Sbeitla	114	8 January 1943	13:56	Spitfire	10 km (6.2 mi) northeast of Souk El Arba
111	6 January 1943	13:15	P-40	4 km (2.5 mi) northeast of Cap Rosa					

=== Awards ===
- Front Flying Clasp of the Luftwaffe for Fighter Pilots in Gold
  - Bronze (30 March 1942)
  - Silver (29 April 1942)
  - Gold (18 August 1942)
- Iron Cross (1939)
  - 2nd class (19 June 1941) (Note: According to MacLean on 30 April 1942.)
  - 1st class (20 July 1941) (Note: According to MacLean on 25 June 1942.)
- Ehrenpokal der Luftwaffe on 13 September 1942 as Unteroffizier and pilot (Note: According to Obermaier on 9 September 1942.)
- Knight's Cross of the Iron Cross with Oak Leaves
  - Knight's Cross on 23 September 1942 and Feldwebel and pilot in the 3./Jagdgeschwader 53
  - 127th Oak Leaves on 23 September 1942 and Feldwebel and pilot in the 3./Jagdgeschwader 53
