= Friedrich-Karl "Tutti" Müller =

German World War II flying ace

Friedrich-Karl Müller
- Friedrich-Karl "Tutti" Müller
- Born: 25 December 1916; Berlin-Lichterfelde, Kingdom of Prussia, German Empire
- Died: 29 May 1944 (aged 27); Salzwedel, Nazi Germany
- Military career
- Allegiance: Nazi Germany
- Branch: Luftwaffe
- Service years: 1936–1944
- Rank: Oberstleutnant (lieutenant colonel)
- Nickname: "Tutti"
- Units: JG 53, JG 3
- Commands: 1./JG 53, 2./JG 53, I./JG 53, IV./JG 3, JG 3
- Conflicts: See battles World War II: Battle of France; Battle of Britain; Eastern Front; Operation Barbarossa; Mediterranean Theatre; Siege of Malta; Tunisian Campaign; Defense of the Reich †
- Awards: Knight's Cross of the Iron Cross with Oak Leaves

Friedrich-Karl "Tutti" Müller (25 December 1916 – 29 May 1944) was a German Luftwaffe military aviator and wing commander during World War II. As a fighter ace, he is credited with 140 aerial victories claimed in more than 600 combat missions. He claimed eight aerial victories during the Battle of France, 89 on the Eastern Front, and further 43 victories against the Western Allies in the Mediterranean Theatre and in Defense of the Reich, including 24 four-engined bombers. He was "ace-in-a-day" four times, shooting down five or more aircraft on a single day.

Born in Berlin-Lichterfelde, Müller grew up in the Weimar Republic and Nazi Germany. Following graduation from school, he volunteered for military service in the Wehrmacht in 1936. Initially serving with the Army, he transferred to the Luftwaffe in 1938. He completed flight training in 1939 and was posted to Jagdgeschwader 53 (JG 53—53rd Fighter Wing). Flying with this wing, Müller claimed his first aerial victory on 27 May 1940 during the Battle of France. He also fought in the Battle of Britain, Operation Barbarossa, the German invasion of the Soviet Union, and in Siege of Malta before again transferring to the Eastern Front in 1942. There, he claimed his 100th aerial victory and was awarded the Knight's Cross of the Iron Cross with Oak Leaves on 23 September 1942.

In November 1943, Müller was given command of I. Gruppe of JG 53 which was operating in Mediterranean Theatre. In February 1944, he transferred to Jagdgeschwader 3 "Udet" (JG 3—3rd Fighter Wing), initially commanding the IV. Gruppe, fighting in defense of the United States Army Air Forces daytime attacks. In April, he was appointed Geschwaderkommodore (wing commander) of JG 3 and claimed his 140th aerial victory on 12 May. Müller was killed in a landing accident on 29 May 1944. Posthumously, he was promoted to Oberstleutnant (lieutenant colonel).

== Early life and career ==
Müller, who was nicknamed "Tutti", was born on 25 December 1916 in Berlin-Lichterfelde, at the time in the Kingdom of Prussia of the German Empire. He was the son of a public accountant (Rendant). From 1924 to 1927, he attended the 14. Gemeindeschule (14th elementary school), from 1927 to 1932, the Oberrealschule Lichtenberg, a secondary school, and graduated from the 2. Städtische Mittelschule (2nd municipal middle school) in 1934, attaining the Mittlere Reife (Middle Maturity). While at school, Müller was also a member of the Hitler Youth in Potsdam. He joined the military service of the Wehrmacht on 17 October 1936, initially serving with 2. Kompanie (2nd company) of Pionier Bataillon 42 (42nd pioneer battalion). On 25 June 1937, he became a Fahnenjunker (cadet), and starting on 16 October 1937, was trained at the Kriegsschule in Munich. There, he was promoted to Fähnrich (officer candidate) on 26 March 1938, effective as of 1 March 1938.

On 28 April 1938, officially effective as of 1 July, Müller was transferred to the Luftwaffe at Bad Aibling where he was promoted to Oberfähnrich (senior officer candidate) on 30 June 1938, effective as of 1 June 1938. On 1 July, Müller was then sent to the Fliegerersatz-Abteilung (Replacement Detachment) 17, renamed to Fliegerersatz-Abteilung (Replacement Detachment) 62 on 11 November 1938, based at Quedlinburg for further training. At Quedlinburg, he was promoted to Leutnant (second lieutenant) on 8 November 1938, effective as of 1 September 1938. His flight training began on 1 March 1939, at first at Oldenburg, and on 17 July 1939 at the Jagdfliegerschule (fighter pilot school) at Werneuchen. (Note: Flight training in the Luftwaffe progressed through the levels A1, A2 and B1, B2, referred to as A/B flight training. A training included theoretical and practical training in aerobatics, navigation, long-distance flights and dead-stick landings. The B courses included high-altitude flights, instrument flights, night landings and training to handle the aircraft in difficult situations.) Following flight training, Müller was posted to the III. Gruppe (3rd group) of Jagdgeschwader 53 (JG 53—53rd Fighter Wing) on 3 October 1939, there he was assigned to the 8. Staffel (8th squadron). (Note: For an explanation of Luftwaffe unit designations see Organization of the Luftwaffe during World War II.)

== World War II ==
World War II in Europe began on Friday 1 September 1939 when German forces invaded Poland. At the time, III. Gruppe was under the command of Hauptmann (Captain) Werner Mölders and had just been formed at Wiesbaden-Erbenheim on 26 September 1939. Müller's commanding officer with 8. Staffel was Oberleutnant (First Lieutenant) Hans von Hahn. Müller flew combat missions during the Phoney War period and received the Iron Cross 2nd Class (Eisernes Kreuz zweiter Klasse) on 17 April 1940. He claimed his first aerial victory during the Battle of France. On 27 May 1940, during the Dunkirk evacuation, he shot down an Armée de l'Air Curtiss Hawk in the vicinity of Amiens. On 10 June, he was credited with the destruction of three French Morane-Saulnier M.S.406 fighter aircraft. The Geschwader flew its last combat missions in the French Campaign on 19 June. On 20 June, III. Gruppe provided fighter cover in the vicinity of Compiègne during the armistice negotiations which was signed on 22 June.

Müller flew through the Battle of Britain adding two Royal Air Force (RAF) fighters to his eight claims after the Battle of France. On 5 September, he claimed a RAF Supermarine Spitfire during an air-sea rescue mission. On 15 September, Müller ran out of fuel in his Messerschmitt Bf 109 E-4 (Werknummer 5251—factory number), resulting in a forced landing in the English Channel.

=== Operation Barbarossa ===
In preparation of Operation Barbarossa, the German invasion of the Soviet Union, JG 53 arrived in Mannheim-Sandhofen on 8 June 1941 where the aircraft were given a maintenance overhaul. On 12 June, the Geschwader began its relocation east, with III. Gruppe moving to Suwałki in northeastern Poland. Two days later, III. Gruppe transferred to a forward airfield at Sobolewo. Here, JG 53 was subordinated to Luftflotte 2 (Air Fleet 2) and was deployed on the right flank of Army Group Centre. The Gruppe flew its first combat mission in the early morning hours of 22 June, with 8. Staffel strafing an airfield at Ossów. Müller claimed his first two aerial victories on the Eastern Front that day. On 29 June, he was shot down and wounded near Krespiga in his Bf 109 F-2 (Werknummer 8153) by friendly anti-aircraft fire.

In early October 1941, III. Gruppe was withdrawn from the Eastern Front, the air elements returned to Mannheim-Sandhofen on 4 October while the ground crew followed by train on 13 October. By this date, Müller was credited with twenty aerial victories.

=== Siege of Malta ===
On 1 November 1941, Müller was transferred to the I. Gruppe of JG 53. Here, he was appointed Staffelkapitän (squadron leader) of 1. Staffel, succeeding Oberleutnant Hans-Joachim Heinecke who was transferred. In December, this unit was moved to Mediterranean air bases at Gela in Sicily. On 20 December, on a Junkers Ju 88 escort mission to La Valletta, Müller claimed a Hawker Hurricane shot down, his 21st aerial victory. In total, he claimed three Hurricanes over Malta. In early May 1942, I. Gruppe handed its aircraft over to those units staying in Sicily and relocated to Schwäbisch Hall. There, the Gruppe was equipped with a full complement of factory new Bf 109 F-4.

=== Back on the Eastern Front ===
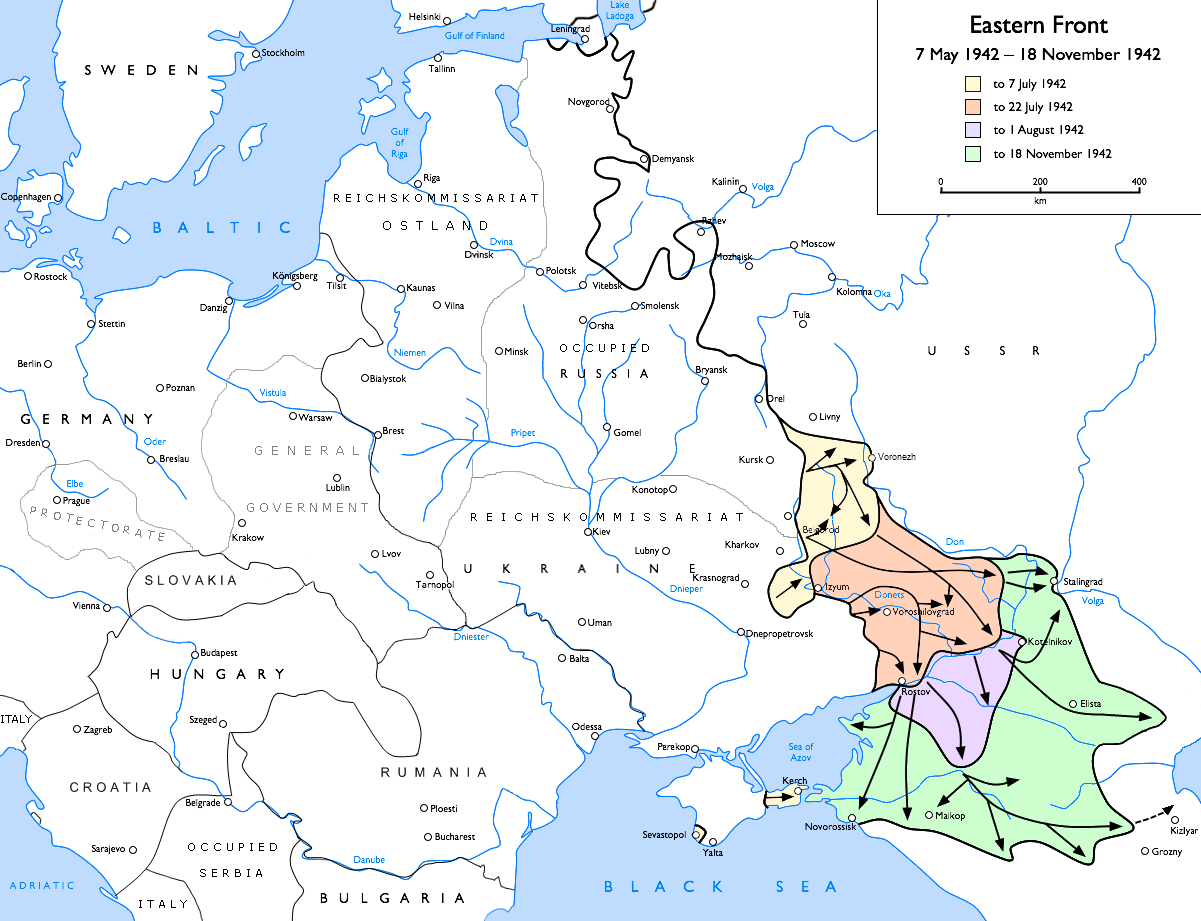
The German advance from 7 May to 18 November 1942. to 7 July to 22 July to 1 August to 18 November

In support of Case Blue, the 1942 strategic summer offensive in southern Russia, I. Gruppe of JG 53 began its relocation to the Eastern Front on 28 May 1942, arriving at Kursk that evening. Based at Kursk for the next three weeks, I. Gruppe supported the 4th Panzer Army in its drive towards Voronezh. The first combat missions were flown on 31 May in the vicinity northeast of Kursk. Müller claimed his first aerial victory in this theater of operations on 3 June over an I-61, a designation for the Mikoyan-Gurevich MiG-1 fighter aircraft. On 31 July, I. Gruppe was moved to Frolovo to provide air cover for 6th Army drive to Stalingrad. By this date, Müller's number of aerial victory claims had increased to 39.

In August, Müller claimed some 25 victories, and in September claimed a further 35 victories. On 10 September, Leutnant Walter Zellot the commander of 2. Staffel of JG 53 was killed in action. The following day, Müller, in addition to his command of 1. Staffel, was also given command of 2. Staffel. As the standard armament of Bf 109 proved largely ineffective against heavily armored Ilyushin Il-2 ground-attack aircraft, additional firepower was provided through a pair of 20 mm MG 151/20 cannons installed in conformal gun pods under the wings of the Bf 109. I. Gruppe was also provided with a number of these up-gunned Bf 109s. On 18 September 1942, flying a "gunboat" Bf 109, Müller claimed six Il-2 ground-attack aircraft, taking his total to 97 aerial victories. The next day, Müller received the Knight's Cross of the Iron Cross (Ritterkreuz des Eisernen Kreuzes) on 19 September 1942 following a series of 18 enemy aircraft destroyed: five on 16 September, three on 17 September, six on 18 September and three on 19 September. On the latter day, he claimed his 98th and 100th aerial victories. He was the 23rd Luftwaffe pilot to achieve the century mark.

Together with Wilhelm Crinius, Müller received the Knight's Cross of the Iron Cross with Oak Leaves (Ritterkreuz des Eisernen Kreuzes mit Eichenlaub) on 23 September 1942. He was the 126th member of the German armed forces to be so honored. The presentation was made by Adolf Hitler in October at the Führerhauptquartier Werwolf, Hitler's headquarters located in a pine forest about 12 kilometres (7.5 mi) north of Vinnytsia, in Ukraine. Three other Luftwaffe officers were presented with the Oak Leaves that day by Hitler, Oberleutnant Wolfgang Tonne, Leutant Hans Beißwenger and Feldwebel Crinius. Müller was promoted to Hauptmann (captain) on 24 October 1942. Following the presentation, Müller, Tonne and Crinius were ordered to Berlin where they made a propaganda appearance at the "House of the Press". At the same time, I. Gruppe of JG 53 relocated from the Eastern Front to Comiso Airfiled in Sicily where they arrived on 10 October.

=== North Africa and Sicily ===
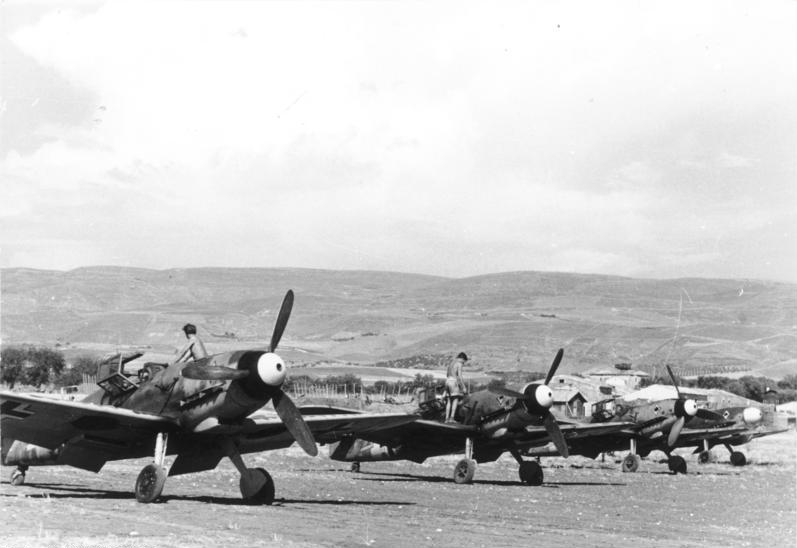
Messerschmitt Bf 109G's of JG 53 in southern Italy

When British forces launched the Second Battle of El Alamein on 23 October, elements of I. Gruppe of JG 53 were ordered to North Africa. In November 1942, Müller was appointed Gruppenkommandeur (group commander) of I. Gruppe of JG 53 and led the unit in Tunisia. On 25 November, I. Gruppe moved from Tunis to Djedeida Airfield. Müller went on leave shortly before Christmas 1942 and returned to his unit at around 23 January 1943. During his absence, command of I. Gruppe temporarily was handed over to Tonne, commander of 3. Staffel. Müller claimed his first aerial victories in this theater of operations on 31 January 1943, shooting down a United States Army Air Forces (USAAF) Boeing B-17 Flying Fortress between Béja and Souk El Khemis. On 25 January, Müller flipped and damaged his aircraft Bf 109 G-6 (Werknummer 14510) during landing at Bizerte Airfield. on 31 January 1943, he claimed his two aerial victories, shooting down a USAAF B-17 bomber and a Lockheed P-38 Lightning fighter aircraft. On 23 March, Müller was engaged with P-38 fighters from the 1st Fighter Group escorting bombers to Bizerte. In this encounter, it is likely that he shot down Lieutenant Slater who baled out off-shore. Two days later, British intelligence believed that Müller had been captured. This assumption was caused by confusing the Staffelkapitän of 1. Staffel, Leutnant Hans Möller who was shot down and captured, with Müller.

On 20 April 1943, Tonne was killed in a flying accident, this event had a significant effect on Müller and influenced his health. On 24 April, Müller claimed two RAF Spitfires shot down, taking his overall score to 114 aerial victories. He claimed his 115th overall and last victory in the North African theater of operations over a Curtiss P-40 Warhawk on 30 April. Following this mission, I. Gruppe handed its aircraft over to II. Gruppe, and the pilots and ground crew were transported by sea to Sicily shortly before the German surrender in North Africa on 12 May.

In Sicily, I. Gruppe was based at Catania Airfield. On 17 June, the Gruppe was moved from Catania to the Italian mainland at Vibo Valentia. Müller was suffering from combat fatigue, requiring a lengthy period of convalescence. During this period, on 1 July 1943, Müller was promoted to Major (major) with a rank age dated 1 January 1944. He received the German Cross in Gold (Deutsches Kreuz in Gold) on 15 November and the Honor Goblet of the Luftwaffe (Ehrenpokal der Luftwaffe) on 13 December 1943.

=== Defense of the Reich ===
On 11 February 1944, the Gruppenkommandeur of IV. Gruppe of Jagdgeschwader 3 "Udet" (JG 3–3rd Fighter Wing), named after the World War I fighter ace Ernst Udet, Major Franz Beyer was killed in action. In consequence, Müller was appointed Gruppenkommandeur of IV. Gruppe and ordered to relocate from Italy to the Venlo airfield, officially taking over command on 26 February. He now fought in the aerial battles in Defense of the Reich, just after the USAAF offensive dubbed "Big Week" came to an end. His command of I. Gruppe of JG 53 was then given to Hauptmann Jürgen Harder. That day, IV. Gruppe was transferred to Salzwedel where it was augmented by Sturmstaffel 1, an experimental unit flying the so-called Sturmböcke (Battering Ram) up-gunned Focke-Wulf Fw 190 A-7 and A-8 aircraft.

On 6 March, the USAAF targeted various industrial centers in and around Berlin. In total, the Eighth Air Force mustered 730 four-engined bombers and 801 fighter aircraft in the first, full-scale daylight attack on Berlin. IV. Gruppe, led by Müller, was one of the Luftwaffe units dispatched to counter this attack and claimed the destruction of seven B-17 bombers, four B-17 Herausschüsse (separation shots–a severely damaged heavy bomber forced to separate from its combat box and which the Luftwaffe counted as an aerial victory) and one North American P-51 Mustang fighter for the loss of one Bf 109 G-6 damaged. In this encounter, Müller was credited with the destruction of two B-17 bombers. Two days later, Müller again headed IV. Gruppe against an attack of the Eighth Air Force targeting the Vereinigte Kugellagerfabriken AG ball bearing factories in Erkner, south of Berlin. That day, Müller claimed one B-17 and one Consolidated B-24 Liberator destroyed, plus one Herausschuss of a B-24, bringing his number of aerial victories claimed to 121.

=== Wing commander and death ===
Emblem of JG 3 "Udet"

On 23 March 1944, the USAAF Eighth Air Force targeted aircraft factories at Braunschweig and other targets of opportunity in Münster, Osnabrück and Achmer. In defense of this attack, JG 3 lost 16 pilots killed in action including the Geschwaderkommodore (wing commander) Oberst Wolf-Dietrich Wilcke. On 12 April, Müller was given command of JG 3 by General der Jagdflieger Adolf Galland. Command of IV. Gruppe was first passed to Hauptmann Heinz Lang before Major Wilhelm Moritz took command on 18 April. Müller, who had his regular wingman Leutnant Dieter Zink transferred to the Geschwaderstab (headquarters unit), claimed eighteen further victories, seventeen of which were four-engined bombers.

On 18 April 776 four-engined bombers and 634 fighters again attacked the industrial targets in the Berlin area. Müller led JG 3 in its attack against the USAAF 3d Bombardment Division. In total, JG 3 claimed the destruction of 25 B-17 bombers plus three further Herausschüsse. In addition, two P-51 and one P-38 fighters were also claimed. Müller was personally credited with two B-17 bombers shot down. For his leadership of JG 3 that day, Müller was honorably referenced in the Wehrmachtbericht on 19 April 1944.

Müller was killed in a landing accident at Salzwedel on 29 May 1944, when his Bf 109 G-6 (Werknummer 410827) stalled on landing approach at low altitude. He was posthumously promoted to Oberstleutnant (lieutenant colonel). He was interred on the Neuer Friedhof Potsdam. His grave has been leveled since. He was briefly succeeded by Major Hans-Ekkehard Bob as commander of JG 3 before Major Heinz Bär took command on 6 June.

== Summary of career ==
=== Aerial victory claims ===
According to US historian David T. Zabecki, Müller was credited with 140 aerial victories. Mathews and Foreman, authors of Luftwaffe Aces – Biographies and Victory Claims, researched the German Federal Archives and found records for 139 aerial victory claims, plus two further unconfirmed claims. This figure includes 89 aerial victories on the Eastern Front and 50 over the Western Allies, including 24 four-engined bombers.

Victory claims were logged to a map-reference (PQ = Planquadrat), for example "PQ 39242". The Luftwaffe grid map (Jägermeldenetz) covered all of Europe, western Russia and North Africa and was composed of rectangles measuring 15 minutes of latitude by 30 minutes of longitude, an area of about 360 square miles (930 km^{2}). These sectors were then subdivided into 36 smaller units to give a location area 3 km × 4 km (1.9 mi × 2.5 mi) in size.

Chronicle of aerial victories
This and the ♠ (Ace of spades) indicates those aerial victories which made Müller an "ace-in-a-day", a term which designates a fighter pilot who has shot down five or more airplanes in a single day. This and the – (dash) indicates unconfirmed aerial victory claims for which Müller did not receive credit. This along with the * (asterisk) indicates an Herausschuss (separation shot)—a severely damaged heavy bomber forced to separate from his combat box which was counted as an aerial victory. This and the ? (question mark) indicates information discrepancies listed by Prien, Stemmer, Rodeike, Bock, Mathews and Foreman.
| Claim | Date | Time | Type | Location | Claim | Date | Time | Type | Location |
– 8. Staffel of Jagdgeschwader 53 – Battle of France — 10 May – 25 June 1940
| 1 | 27 May 1940 | 09:10 | P-36 Hawk | 15 km (9.3 mi) northwest of Amiens | 5 | 7 June 1940 | 16:53? (Note: According to Mathews and Foreman claimed at 16:58.) | M.S.406 | Compiègne |
| 2 | 3 June 1940 | 14:55? (Note: According to Mathews and Foreman claimed at 16:55.) | Hurricane | Paris | 6 | 10 June 1940 | 08:20 | M.S.406 | southwest of Reims |
| 3 | 5 June 1940 | 18:20 | M.S.406 | Compiègne | 7 | 10 June 1940 | 08:30 | M.S.406 | 10 km (6.2 mi) south of Épernay |
| 4 | 5 June 1940 | 18:24 | M.S.406 | Compiègne | 8 | 10 June 1940 | 08:30 | M.S.406 | 10 km (6.2 mi) south of Épernay |
– 8. Staffel of Jagdgeschwader 53 – Action at the Channel and over England — 26 June 1940 – 7 June 1941
| 9? (Note: According to Mathews and Foreman this claim is unconfirmed.) | 5 September 1940 | 16:25 | Spitfire | | 10 | 6 September 1940 | 10:25 | Spitfire | Dungeness |
– Stab III. Gruppe of Jagdgeschwader 53 – Action at the Channel and over England — 26 June 1940 – 7 June 1941
| — | 29 April 1941 | — | Spitfire | Dungeness | | | | | |
– Stab III. Gruppe of Jagdgeschwader 53 – Operation Barbarossa — 22 June – 4 October 1941
| 11 | 22 June 1941 | 16:45 | I-17 (MiG-1) | | — (Note: This unconfirmed claim is not listed by Mathews and Foreman.) | 8 August 1941 | — | I-16 | |
| 12 | 22 June 1941 | 16:48 | I-17 (MiG-1) | | 17 | 23 August 1941 | 17:55 | I-16 | vicinity of Velikiye Luki |
| 13 | 25 June 1941 | 13:35 | SB-3 | | 18 | 24 August 1941 | 18:48? (Note: According to Mathews and Foreman claimed at 18:40.) | I-153 | |
| 14 | 26 July 1941 | 08:00 | I-17 (MiG-1) | | 19 | 27 August 1941 | 18:35 | I-61 (MiG-3) | |
| 15 | 27 July 1941 | 10:20 | Pe-2 | | 20 | 9 September 1941 | 11:45 | I-16 | northeast of Morowsk |
| 16 | 30 July 1941 | 19:24 | I-17 (MiG-1) | | | | | | |
– 1. Staffel of Jagdgeschwader 53 – Mediterranean Theater — 15 December 1941 – 30 April 1942
| 21 | 20 December 1941 | 09:23 | Hurricane | La Valetta, Malta | 23 | 10 April 1942 | 18:18 | Hurricane | north of Ħal Far, Malta |
| 22 | 27 December 1941 | 12:05 | Hurricane | 30 km (19 mi) east of Malta | | | | | |
– 1. Staffel of Jagdgeschwader 53 – Eastern Front — 28 May – 27 September 1942
| 24 | 3 June 1942 | 16:12 | I-61 (MiG-3) | | 63♠ | 30 August 1942 | 17:10 | Il-2 | southwest of Sarepta |
| 25 | 28 June 1942 | 14:38 | MiG-1 | | 64♠ | 30 August 1942 | 17:13? (Note: According to Mathews and Foreman claimed at 17:15.) | Il-2 | north of Sarepta |
| 26 | 2 July 1942 | 06:50 | MiG-1 | | 65 | 4 September 1942 | 15:35 | Yak-1 | 6 km (3.7 mi) northwest of Stalingrad |
| 27 | 2 July 1942 | 07:00 | MiG-1 | | 66 | 5 September 1942 | 05:07 | Yak-1 | 5 km (3.1 mi) west of Stalingrad |
| 28 | 3 July 1942 | 18:15 | LaGG-3 | 3 km (1.9 mi) east of Sossne-Olynn | 67 | 5 September 1942 | 12:19 | Yak-1 | Stalingrad |
| 29 | 6 July 1942 | 16:37 | LaGG-3 | | 68♠ | 7 September 1942 | 07:20 | Yak-1 | 8 km (5.0 mi) north of Hp. 564 km |
| 30 | 8 July 1942 | 11:37 | Il-2 | | 69♠ | 7 September 1942 | 11:25 | Il-2 | north of Hp. 564 km |
| 31 | 8 July 1942 | 11:43 | Il-2 | | 70♠ | 7 September 1942 | 11:26? (Note: According to Mathews and Foreman claimed at 11:28 over a Mikoyan-Gurevich MiG-1.) | Il-2? | 6 km (3.7 mi) north of Hp. 564 km |
| 32 | 12 July 1942 | 09:05 | Boston | | 71♠ | 7 September 1942 | 15:50 | Il-2 | 15 km (9.3 mi) north of Kotluban train station |
| 33 | 26 July 1942 | 08:43 | LaGG-3 | | 72♠ | 7 September 1942 | 15:51 | Il-2 | 9 km (5.6 mi) south of Hp. 564 km |
| 34 | 26 July 1942 | 08:45 | LaGG-3 | | 73♠ | 7 September 1942 | 15:53 | Il-2 | west of Hp. 564 km |
| 35 | 26 July 1942 | 08:47 | LaGG-3 | | 74♠ | 7 September 1942 | 15:56 | Il-2 | 15 km (9.3 mi) northeast of Kotluban train station |
| 36 | 28 July 1942 | 09:55 | R-5 | Proletarskaja airfield | 75 | 9 September 1942 | 05:30 | I-153 | east of Stalingrad |
| 37 | 28 July 1942 | 16:35 | U-2 | west of Salsk | 76 | 9 September 1942 | 05:36 | I-153 | east of Stalingrad |
| 38 | 29 July 1942 | 08:32 | LaGG-3 | 1 km (0.62 mi) northwest of Salsk | 77 | 9 September 1942 | 09:25 | Yak-1 | east of Stalingrad |
| 39 | 29 July 1942 | 17:50 | I-16 | 3 km (1.9 mi) north of Salsk | 78 | 11 September 1942 | 12:25 | I-153 | 4 km (2.5 mi) east of Stalingrad |
| 40 | 1 August 1942 | 07:06 | LaGG-3 | PQ 39242; 20 km (12 mi) north of Kalach | 79 | 11 September 1942 | 14:40 | Il-2 | 12 km (7.5 mi) northeast of Kotluban train station |
| 41 | 2 August 1942 | 11:27 | I-180 (Yak-7) | PQ 39433; 15 km (9.3 mi) south of Pitomnik | 80 | 11 September 1942 | 15:25 | Yak-1 | eastern edge of Stalingrad |
| 42 | 4 August 1942 | 13:40 | MiG-1 | southwest of Beketowskaja | 81 | 13 September 1942 | 16:45 | Yak-1 | southeastern sector of Stalingrad |
| 43 | 6 August 1942 | 07:00 | Il-2 | PQ 38232; 10 km (6.2 mi) south of Aksay | 82 | 15 September 1942 | 12:25 | I-153 | east of Stalingrad |
| 44 | 8 August 1942 | 06:16 | Er-2 | south of Tinguta | 83 | 15 September 1942 | 12:35 | I-16 | 7 km (4.3 mi) east of Stalingrad |
| 45 | 9 August 1942 | 12:08 | MiG-3 | PQ 49173; 10 km (6.2 mi) east of Pitomnik | 84 | 15 September 1942 | 16:25 | P-40 | northwest of Stalingrad |
| 46 | 9 August 1942 | 16:10 | LaGG-3 | PQ 39421; 20 km (12 mi) southwest of Pitomnik | 85♠ | 16 September 1942 | 06:30 | Yak-5 | 10 km (6.2 mi) east of Stalingrad |
| 47 | 10 August 1942 | 17:12 | MiG-3 | PQ 3975; 40 km (25 mi) south of Nizhny Chir | 86♠ | 16 September 1942 | 15:22 | Yak-1 | 6 km (3.7 mi) west of Stalingrad |
| 48 | 12 August 1942 | 04:22 | Il-2 | PQ 38112; 20 km (12 mi) north-northwest of Kotelnikowo | 87♠ | 16 September 1942 | 15:24 | Yak-1 | 7 km (4.3 mi) west of Stalingrad |
| 49 | 12 August 1942 | 04:29 | MiG-3 | PQ 3946; 20 km (12 mi) southwest of Bassargino | 88♠ | 16 September 1942 | 15:28 | Yak-1 | Petrosch village |
| 50 | 12 August 1942 | 04:32 | MiG-3 | PQ 3946; 20 km (12 mi) southwest of Bassargino | 89♠ | 16 September 1942 | 15:35 | I-153 | Gresswaja |
| 51 | 18 August 1942 | 07:15 | Il-2 | northwest of Katschalinskaja | 90 | 17 September 1942 | 06:28 | P-40 | 5 km (3.1 mi) northwest of Akhtuba |
| 52 | 18 August 1942 | 07:20 | Il-2 | southeast of Katschalinskaja | 91 | 17 September 1942 | 16:22 | LaGG-3? (Note: According to Mathews and Foreman claimed as a Mikoyan-Gurevich MiG-3.) | PQ 49722; 15 km (9.3 mi) north of Gumrak |
| 53 | 20 August 1942 | 04:45 | Er-2 | Panschino | 92 | 17 September 1942 | 16:30 | Yak-1 | PQ 4971; 15 km (9.3 mi) northeast of Grebenka |
| 54 | 21 August 1942 | 17:25 | I-180 (Yak-7) | Krassnoarmejsk | 93♠ | 18 September 1942 | 05:55 | Il-2 | PQ 49112 vicinity of Gumrak |
| 55 | 23 August 1942 | 06:50 | I-180 (Yak-7) | Gorodishche | 94♠ | 18 September 1942 | 05:56 | Il-2 | PQ 49152 vicinity of Gumrak |
| 56 | 23 August 1942 | 12:10 | I-153 | Gorodishche | 95♠ | 18 September 1942 | 05:57 | Il-2 | PQ 49123; 15 km (9.3 mi) north of Gumrak |
| 57 | 23 August 1942 | 12:13 | LaGG-3 | Gorodishche | 96♠ | 18 September 1942 | 05:58 | Il-2 | PQ 49122; 15 km (9.3 mi) north of Gumrak |
| 58 | 24 August 1942 | 12:00 | LaGG-3 | west of Stalingrad | 97♠ | 18 September 1942 | 05:59 | Il-2 | PQ 40793; 15 km (9.3 mi) north of Grebenka |
| 59 | 25 August 1942 | 08:45 | MiG-3 | east of Radkowo | — ? | 18 September 1942 | — | Il-2 | |
| 60♠ | 30 August 1942 | 13:18 | MiG-1 | Kotluban train station | 98 | 19 September 1942 | 08:40 | LaGG-3? (Note: According to Mathews and Foreman claimed as a Yakovlev Yak-1.) | PQ 4075; 30 km (19 mi) north of Gumrak |
| 61♠ | 30 August 1942 | 13:22 | MiG-1 | Dubowy | 99 | 19 September 1942 | 08:52 | LaGG-3 | PQ 4912; 10 km (6.2 mi) north of Gumrak |
| 62♠ | 30 August 1942 | 17:08 | Il-2 | southwest of Sarepta | 100 | 19 September 1942 | 08:53 | LaGG-3 | PQ 4913; 10 km (6.2 mi) north of Grebenka |
– Stab I. Gruppe of Jagdgeschwader 53 – Mediterranean Theater — 1 October – 31 December 1942
| 101 | 27 November 1942 | 11:15 | Spitfire | 10 km (6.2 mi) northeast of Majaz al Bab | 103 | 28 November 1942 | 15:43 | P-38 | 15 km (9.3 mi) east of Mateur |
| 102 | 28 November 1942 | 15:35 | Spitfire | 20 km (12 mi) east of Mateur | | | | | |
– Stab I. Gruppe of Jagdgeschwader 53 – North Africa — 1 January – May 1943
| 104 | 23 January 1943 | 11:55 | B-17 | southwest of Majaz al Bab | 110 | 19 April 1943 | 17:00 | Spitfire | Tunis E-19 airfield |
| 105 | 31 January 1943 | 12:08 | B-17 | 10 km (6.2 mi) southeast of Tabarka | 111 | 19 April 1943 | 17:08 | Spitfire | 20 km (12 mi) west-southwest of Tunis E-21 airfield |
| 106 | 31 January 1943 | 12:10 | P-38 | 10 km (6.2 mi) southeast of Tabarka | 112 | 20 April 1943 | 09:53 | Spitfire | 20 km (12 mi) west of Tunis E-21 airfield |
| 107 | 25 February 1943 | 12:15 | Spitfire | 15 km (9.3 mi) west of Souk El Khemis | 113 | 24 April 1943 | 16:12 | Spitfire | 4 km (2.5 mi) west of Bir Melarga |
| 108 | 10 March 1943 | 15:55 | P-38 | Souk El Arba | 114 | 24 April 1943 | 16:14 | Spitfire | 3 km (1.9 mi) west of Defienne |
| 109 | 23 March 1943 | 12:48 | P-38 | 15 km (9.3 mi) west of Cap Serrat | 115 | 30 April 1943 | 12:15 | P-40 | 5 km (3.1 mi) northwest of Cap Bon |
– Stab I. Gruppe of Jagdgeschwader 53 – Sicily — May 1943
| 116 | 19 May 1943 | 13:40 | P-38 | 18 km (11 mi) east of Marettino | 117 | 23 May 1943 | 16:25 | Spitfire | 6 km (3.7 mi) northeast of La Valetta |
– IV. Gruppe of Jagdgeschwader 3 – Defense of the Reich — March 1944
| 118 | 6 March 1944 | 13:05 | B-17 | PQ 15 Ost S/GF-8; Klaistow | 121 | 8 March 1944 | 15:30 | B-24 | PQ 15 Ost S/FA-5; Potsdam-Brandenburg |
| 119 | 6 March 1944 | 13:14 | B-17 | PQ 15 Ost S/GH-4; Erkner | 122 | 8 March 1944 | 15:34 | B-24* | PQ 05 Ost S/FU; Potsdam-Brandenburg |
| 120 | 8 March 1944 | 13:30 | B-17 | PQ 15 Ost S/HD-2 southwest of Burg | | | | | |
– Stab of Jagdgeschwader 3 – Defense of the Reich — April – May 1944
| 123 | 8 April 1944 | 14:16 | B-24 | north of Braunschweig | 132 | 22 April 1944 | 19:46 | B-24 | PQ 05 Ost S/NQ-OQ; Morsbach/Diersdorf |
| 124 | 9 April 1944 | 11:40 | B-24 | 30–40 km (19–25 mi) north of Rügen | 133 | 22 April 1944 | 19:46 | B-24 | PQ 05 Ost S/NQ-OQ; Morsbach/Diersdorf |
| 125 | 9 April 1944 | 11:40? (Note: According to Mathews and Foreman claimed at 11:50.) | B-24* | 30–40 km (19–25 mi) north of Rügen | 134 | 24 April 1944 | 13:35 | B-17 | PQ 15 Ost S/CC east of Augsburg |
| 126 | 11 April 1944 | 11:00 | B-17 | PQ 15 Ost S/HB, Braunschweig | 135 | 24 April 1944 | 13:50 | B-17 | PQ 15 Ost S/CD north of Munich |
| 127 | 11 April 1944 | 11:04 | B-17 | west of Magdeburg | 136 | 8 May 1944 | 09:30 | B-24 | PQ 15 Ost S/FA-9 west of Gifhorn |
| 128 | 13 April 1944 | 14:00 | B-17 | PQ 05 Ost S/RT-QT vicinity of Aschaffenburg | 137 | 8 May 1944 | 12:12? (Note: According to Mathews and Foreman claimed at 12:00.) | P-51 | PQ 05 Ost S/FT-1 north of Hanover |
| 129 | 13 April 1944 | 14:05 | B-17 | PQ 05 Ost S/RT-QT vicinity of Aschaffenburg | 138 | 8 May 1944 | 12:25 | B-17 | PQ 05 Ost S/FT-1 southwest of Hoya |
| 130 | 18 April 1944 | 14:32 | B-17 | PQ 15 Ost S/FF; Nauen, west of Berlin | 139 | 12 May 1944 | 12:32 | B-17 | PQ 05 Ost S/QR; Wiesbaden |
| 131 | 18 April 1944 | 14:38 | B-17 | PQ 15 Ost S/FF; Nauen, west of Berlin | 140 | 12 May 1944 | 12:37 | B-17 | PQ 05 Ost S/PR vicinity of Giessen/Frankfurt am Main |

=== Awards ===
- Iron Cross (1939)
  - 2nd Class (17 April 1940)
  - 1st Class (20 June 1940)
- Knight's Cross of the Iron Cross with Oak Leaves
  - Knight's Cross on 19 September 1942 as Oberleutnant and Staffelkapitän of the 1./Jagdgeschwader 53 (Note: According to Fellgiebel as Staffelkapitän of the 8./Jagdgeschwader 53 on 14 September 1941. Both Obermaier and Scherzer give 19 September 1942 as the presentation date.)
  - 126th Oak Leaves on 23 September 1942 as Oberleutnant and Staffelkapitän of the 1./Jagdgeschwader 53 (Note: Both Fellgiebel and Scherzer state that Müller received the Oak Leaves while serving with 1./Jagdgeschwader 3 "Udet", while Prien states that he was serving with 1./Jagdgeschwader 53. 1./Jagdgeschwader 53 seems to be correct based upon the chronicles of Jagdgeschwader 53 which details the chain of events leading to the awarding of Oak Leaves just 4 days after the Knight's Cross of the Iron Cross.)
- German Cross in Gold on 15 November 1943 as Major in the I./Jagdgeschwader 53
- Honour Goblet of the Luftwaffe (Ehrenpokal der Luftwaffe) on 13 December 1943 as Hauptmann and pilot
- Named reference in the Wehrmachtbericht on 19 April 1944

=== Dates of rank ===
| 1 June 1937: | Gefreiter |
| 25 June 1937 | Fahnenjunker |
| 26 March 1938: | Fähnrich (officer candidate), effective as of 1 March 1938 |
| 30 June 1938: | Oberfähnrich, effective as of 1 June 1938 |
| 8 November 1938: | Leutnant (Second Lieutenant), effective as of 1 September 1938 |
| 1 September 1940: | Oberleutnant (First Lieutenant) |
| 24 October 1942: | Hauptmann (Captain) |
| 1 July 1943: | Major (Major), with a rank age dated 1 January 1944 |

== Notes ==
Military offices
| Preceded by Oberst Wolf-Dietrich Wilcke | Commander of Jagdgeschwader 3 Udet; 24 March 1944 – 29 May 1944 | Succeeded by Major Heinrich Bär |
| Preceded by Oberstleutnant Günther Freiherr von Maltzahn | Acting Commander of Jagdgeschwader 53 Pik As; October 1943 – October 1943 | Succeeded by Major Kurt Ubben |
