= Detlev Rohwer =

German Luftwaffe ace and recipient of the Knight's Cross of the Iron Cross

- Born: 14 November 1917; Kiel, German Empire
- Died: 30 March 1944 (aged 26); Ibbenbüren, Germany
- Military career
- Allegiance: Nazi Germany
- Branch: Luftwaffe
- Service years: 1939–1944
- Rank: Hauptmann (captain)
- Units: JG 1, JG 3
- Commands: II./JG 1, II./JG 3
- Conflicts: World War II: Battle of France; Battle of Britain; Operation Barbarossa; Defense of the Reich
- Awards: Knight's Cross of the Iron Cross

Detlev Rohwer (14 November 1917 – 30 March 1944) was a German Luftwaffe ace and recipient of the Knight's Cross of the Iron Cross during World War II. The Knight's Cross of the Iron Cross, and its variants were the highest awards in the military and paramilitary forces of Nazi Germany during World War II. During his career he was credited with 38 aerial victories, 12 on the Western Front and 26 on the Eastern Front.

== Career ==
Rohwer was born on 14 November 1917 in Kiel, at the time in the Province of Schleswig-Holstein, a province of the Kingdom of Prussia.

Following aerial combat with Royal Air Force (RAF) Hawker Hurricane fighters on 2 September 1940, Rohwer made a forced landing in his Messerschmitt Bf 109 E in the English Channel off of Maidstone. He was later rescued unhurt by the Seenotdienst (air-sea rescue). Rohwer was awarded the Knight's Cross of the Iron Cross (Ritterkreuz des Eisernen Kreuzes) on 5 October 1941 for 28 aerial victories claimed.

On 12 May 1942, Rohwer was appointed Staffelkapitän of 6. Staffel of Jagdgeschwader 1 (JG 1—1st Fighter Wing). He succeeded Oberleutnant Eberhard Bock who had been transferred. On 20 June, Rohwer was temporarily appointed Gruppenkommandeur (group commander) of II. Gruppe of JG 1. He replaced Hauptmann Hans von Hahn who had been relieved of his command on 15 June following the shooting of a sentry. On 4 October, Rohwer was transferred and appointed Staffelkapitän of 2. Staffel of JG 3. He succeeded Oberleutnant Erwin Straznicky who was killed in action. In consequence, command of II. Gruppe of JG 1 was passed to Major Herbert Kijewski. On 29 November, Rohwer was shot down and wounded when his Messerschmitt Bf 109 G-2/R1 (Werknummer 13910—factory number) was hit by ground fire 6 kilometers (3.7 miles) south of the Chir. During his convalescence, he was replaced by Leutnant Franz Daspelgruber as head of 3. Staffel.

=== Defense of the Reich and death ===
In March 1943, I. Gruppe had assembled at Döberitz, located approximately 10 kilometers (6.2 miles) west of Staaken, for a period of rest, replenishment and preparation for defense of the Reich missions. In early April, the Gruppe was ordered to Mönchengladbach after it had received 37 factory new Bf 109 G-4 fighter aircraft equipped with a pair of 20 mm MG 151/20 cannons installed in conformal gun pods under the wings. There, the pilots trained formation flying, operating in Staffel and Gruppen strength, required to combat the United States Army Air Forces (USAAF) heavy bomber formations. A few of the more experienced fighter pilots were sent to Brandenburg-Briest for additional training on Y-Control for fighters, a system to control groups of fighters intercepting USAAF bomber formations. In early May, the Gruppe had completed its training period and was subordinated to Stab of JG 3 which was under control of 3. Jagd-Division (3rd Fighter Division).

In February 1944, Rohwer was appointed Gruppenkommandeur of II. Gruppe of JG 3. He replaced Hauptmann Heinrich Sannemann who had temporarily led the Gruppe. In consequence, command of 2. Staffel was given to Leutnant Harro Schlüter. Rohwer was wounded on 29 March 1944 following a forced landing west of Osnabrück when he was strafed by marauding Lockheed P-38 Lightning fighters. Sustaining wounds to his leg, he was taken to a hospital where he succumbed to his wounds the following day. Command of II. Gruppe was again given to Sannemann.

== Summary of career ==
=== Aerial victory claims ===
According to Obermaier, Rohwer was credited with 38 aerial victories, 26 of which on the Eastern Front, 12 over the Western Front, and further destroying six aircraft on the ground. Mathews and Foreman, authors of Luftwaffe Aces — Biographies and Victory Claims, researched the German Federal Archives and found records for 36 aerial victories, 26 of which on the Eastern Front and ten over the Western Allies.

Victory claims were logged to a map-reference (PQ = Planquadrat), for example "PQ 35 Ost 30541". The Luftwaffe grid map (Jägermeldenetz) covered all of Europe, western Russia and North Africa and was composed of rectangles measuring 15 minutes of latitude by 30 minutes of longitude, an area of about 360 square miles (930 km^{2}). These sectors were then subdivided into 36 smaller units to give a location area 3 km × 4 km (1.9 mi × 2.5 mi) in size.

Chronicle of aerial victories
Claim	Date	Time	Type	Location	Claim	Date	Time	Type	Location
– Stab I. Gruppe of Jagdgeschwader 3 – Battle of France — 10 May – 25 June 1940
1	6 June 1940	—	Blenheim	Saint-Valery-Abbeville					
– Stab I. Gruppe of Jagdgeschwader 3 – Battle of Britain and on the English Channel — 26 June 1940 – 9 June 1941
2	15 September 1940	—	Hurricane	vicinity of London	4	9 October 1940	—	Hurricane	southeast of London
3	15 September 1940	—	Hurricane	north of London					
– Stab I. Gruppe of Jagdgeschwader 3 – Operation Barbarossa — 22 June – 16 September 1941
5	25 June 1941	15:05	I-153	20 km (12 mi) northeast of Dubno	17	16 July 1941	15:25	SB-3	10 km (6.2 mi) east of Berdychiv
6	26 June 1941	06:15	DB-3	northeast of Brody	18	16 July 1941	15:28	SB-3	10 km (6.2 mi) east of Berdychiv
7	26 June 1941	14:20	SB-2	Szczurowcze	19	16 July 1941	15:30	SB-3	10 km (6.2 mi) east of Berdychiv
8	26 June 1941	14:20	SB-2	Szczurowcze	20	31 July 1941	17:05	I-16	15 km (9.3 mi) west of Cherkasy
9	29 June 1941	18:05	Pe-2	30 km (19 mi) south of Ostriv	21	11 August 1941	06:46	SB-2	6 km (3.7 mi) west of Boryspil
10	29 June 1941	18:10	Pe-2	10 km (6.2 mi) southeast of Ostriv	22	12 August 1941	—	I-16	over Kiev
11	2 July 1941	09:50	V-11 (Il-2)	15 km (9.3 mi) southeast of Zwiatel	23	14 August 1941	13:00	I-16	southeast of Kaniv
12	6 July 1941	15:40	SB-2	southeast of Shepetivka	24	15 August 1941	17:50	I-153	north of Kaniv
13	6 July 1941	15:45	DB-3	southeast of Shepetivka	25	16 August 1941	10:02	DB-3	east of Kaniv
14	13 July 1941	16:15	SB-2	20 km (12 mi) east of Berdychiv	26	16 August 1941	10:05	DB-3	east of Kaniv
15	13 July 1941	16:16	SB-2	Oschadowka	27	16 August 1941	10:08	DB-3	east of Kaniv
16	13 July 1941	16:19	SB-2	10 km (6.2 mi) east of Oschadowka	28	7 September 1941	13:10	R-10 (Seversky)	southeast of Kremenchuk
– 2. Staffel of Jagdgeschwader 3 "Udet" – Eastern Front — 4 October – 29 November 1942
29	13 November 1942	11:35	MiG-3	PQ 35 Ost 30541; 15 km (9.3 mi) west of Kletskaya	30	21 November 1942	11:42	Il-2	PQ 35 Ost 49372 southwest of Werchnedjeprow
– 2. Staffel of Jagdgeschwader 3 "Udet" – Defense of the Reich — 1 May – 22 October 1943
31	20 May 1943	12:58	P-47	PQ 05 Ost 2211	33	14 October 1943	14:08	P-47	PQ 05 Ost S/KJ-4, 10 km (6.2 mi) west of Weert; Rosendaal
32	8 October 1943	15:00	P-47	PQ 05 Ost S/EN-8, northwest of Meppel; Havelte east of Steenwijk					
– 2. Staffel of Jagdgeschwader 3 "Udet" – Western Front — 21 October – 31 December 1943
34	24 October 1943	12:20	Spitfire	PQ 05 Ost S/QE-1; Auxi-le-Château					
– Stab II. Gruppe of Jagdgeschwader 3 "Udet" – Defense of the Reich — February – 29 March 1944
35	6 March 1944	14:20	P-38	PQ 15 Ost S/ED-15; 10 km (6.2 mi) west of Wittenberge	36	8 March 1944	15:12	P-38	PQ 15 Ost S/GU; Hannover

=== Awards ===
- Iron Cross (1939) 2nd and 1st Class
- Knight's Cross of the Iron Cross on 5 October 1941 as Leutnant and pilot in the I./Jagdgeschwader 3 (Note: According to Scherzer as pilot in the Stab I./Jagdgeschwader 3.)

== Notes ==
Military offices
Preceded by Hauptmann Hans von Hahn	Commander of II./Jagdgeschwader 1; 20 June 1942 – October 1942	Succeeded by Major Herbert Kijewski
Preceded by Hauptmann Heinrich Sannemann	Commander of IV./Jagdgeschwader 3 February 1944 – 30 March 1944	Succeeded by Hauptmann Heinrich Sannemann
