= Kalle (river) =

River in Germany

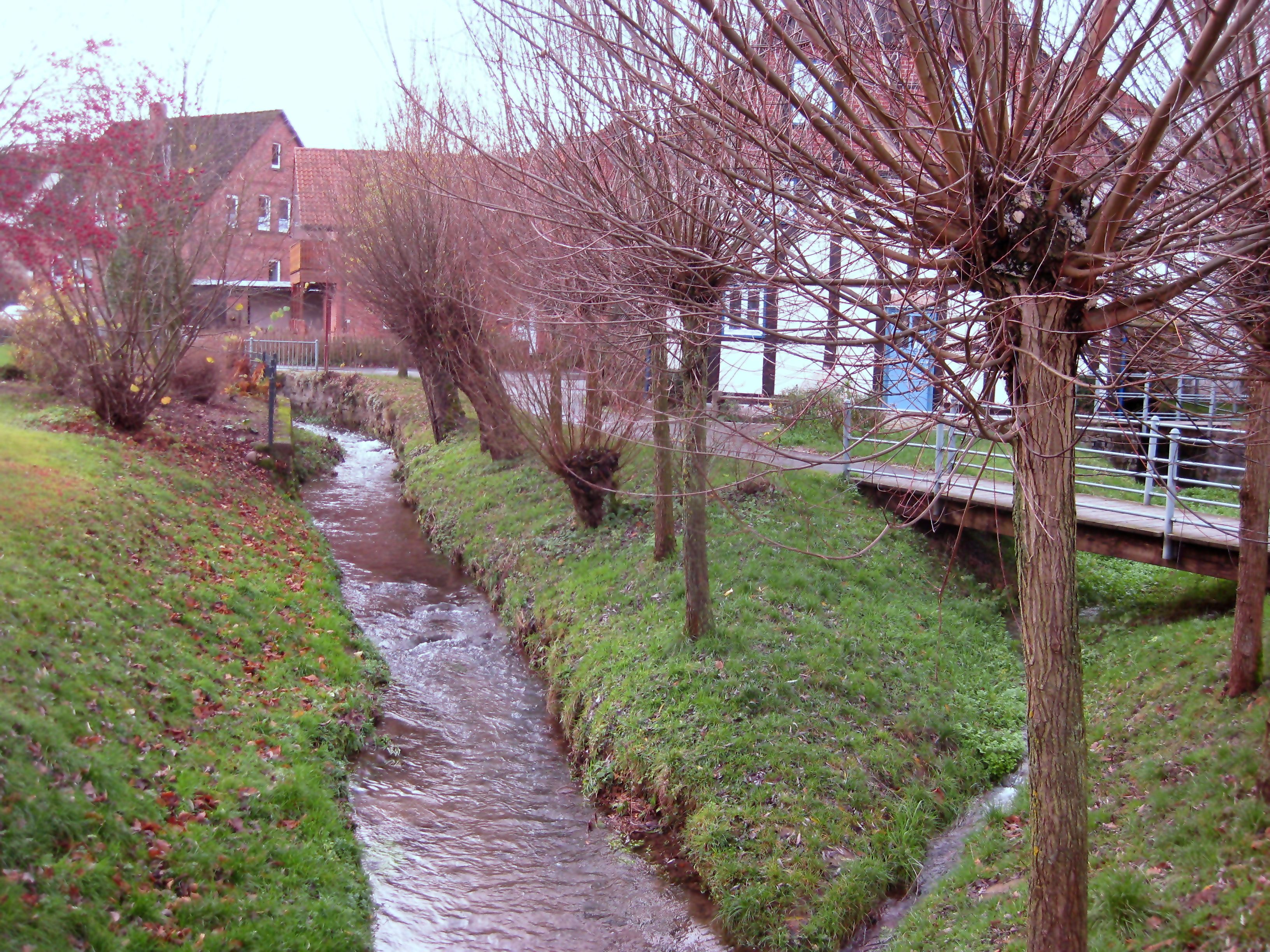

Location
- Country: Germany
- State: North Rhine-Westphalia

Physical characteristics
- Source
  - coordinates: 52°04′18″N 9°02′15″E
- Mouth
  - location: Weser
  - coordinates: 52.1667°N 8.9052°E
- Length: 19.6 km (12.2 mi)

Basin features
- Progression: Weser→ North Sea

Kalle (German pronunciation: [ˈkalə]; in its upper course: Osterkalle) is a river of North Rhine-Westphalia, Germany. It flows into the Weser in Kalldorf.

== See also ==
- List of rivers of North Rhine-Westphalia
