= Jagdfliegerführer Oberitalien =

Jagdfliegerführer Oberitalien (Fighter Leader Northern Italy) was part of Luftflotte 2 (Air Fleet 2), one of the primary divisions of the German Luftwaffe in World War II. It was formed in July 1943 in Bologna and subordinated to the Luftflotte 2. The headquarters were located at Bologna and moved to Pontecchio on March 18, 1944, moved again on July 15, 1944 to Verona.

== Commanding officers ==
=== Fliegerführer ===
- unknown
- Oberstleutnant Günther Freiherr von Maltzahn, 5 October 1943 – December 1944
- Oberst Eduard Neumann, December 1944 – April 1945
- Major Hans von Hahn, April 1945 – 8 May 1945
