= Hans von Hahn =

German fighter pilot during World War II (1914–1957)

- Born: 7 August 1914; Frankfurt am Main, German Empire
- Died: 5 November 1957 (aged 43); Frankfurt am Main, West Germany
- Military career
- Allegiance: Nazi Germany
- Branch: Kriegsmarine (to 1935); Luftwaffe
- Service years: 1934–1945
- Rank: Hauptmann (captain)
- Units: JG 53, JG 3, JG 1, JG 103; Jagdfliegerführer Oberitalien
- Commands: I./JG 3, II./JG 1, JG 103; Jagdfliegerführer Oberitalien
- Conflicts: See battles World War II: Battle of France; Battle of Britain; Operation Barbarossa; Defense of the Reich
- Awards: Knight's Cross of the Iron Cross

Hans von Hahn (7 August 1914 – 5 November 1957) was a Luftwaffe ace and recipient of the Knight's Cross of the Iron Cross during World War II. The Knight's Cross of the Iron Cross, and its variants were the highest awards in the military and paramilitary forces of Nazi Germany during World War II. During his career he was credited with 34 aerial victories, 15 on the Western Front and 19 on the Eastern Front.

== Early life and career ==
Hahn was born on 7 August 1914 in Frankfurt am Main, at the time in the Province of Hesse-Nassau, a province of the Kingdom of Prussia within the German Empire. In 1934, Hahn joined the Reichsmarine, (Note: The German Reichsmarine was renamed the Kriegsmarine on 1 June 1935.) the German navy of the Weimar Republic and in 1935 transferred to the newly emerging Luftwaffe.

== World War II ==
World War II in Europe began on Friday 1 September 1939 when German forces invaded Poland. On 18 September 1939, Hahn was appointed Staffelkapitän of 8. Staffel (8th squadron) of Jagdgeschwader 53 (JG 53—53rd Fighter Wing). He was the first commander of the Staffel which was part of the newly created III. Gruppe (3rd group) of JG 53 under the command of Hauptmann Werner Mölders. Hahn claimed his first aerial victory on 22 December 1939 during "Phoney War". That day, he claimed a Royal Air Force (RAF) Hawker Hurricane fighter from the No. 73 Squadron.

On 27 August 1940, Hahn was appointed Gruppenkommandeur (group commander) of I. Gruppe of Jagdgeschwader 3 (JG 3—3rd Fighter Wing). He replaced Oberleutnant Lothar Keller who had temporarily led the Gruppe after its former commander Hauptmann Günther Lützow had been made Geschwaderkommodore (wing commander) of JG 3 on 21 August. Command of 8. Staffel of JG 53 was given to Oberleutnant Hans Kunert.

On 14 February, I. Gruppe began relocating back to Germany for a period of rest and replenishment, completing the transfer to Mannheim-Sandhofen Airfield by 18 February. The pilots were then sent on a skiing vacation to Seefeld in Tirol and returned to active duty by 31 March. The Gruppe was then equipped with the Messerschmitt Bf 109 F variant. On 18 April, I. Gruppe began relocating back to English Channel, then based at Saint-Pol-sur-Ternoise, completing the transfer by 6 May. In late May, the Gruppe was again withdrawn from the English Channel.

=== War against the Soviet Union ===
In preparation for Operation Barbarossa, the German invasion of the Soviet Union, the I. Gruppe moved to an airfield at Dub on 18 June 1941. At the start of the campaign, JG 3 was subordinated to the V. Fliegerkorps (5th Air Corps), under command of General der Flieger Robert Ritter von Greim, which was part of Luftflotte 4 (4th Air Fleet), under command of Generaloberst Alexander Löhr. These air elements supported Generalfeldmarschall Gerd von Rundstedt's Heeresgruppe Süd (Army Group South), with the objective of capturing Ukraine and its capital Kiev.

Hahn was awarded the Knight's Cross of the Iron Cross (Ritterkreuz des Eisernen Kreuzes) on 9 July for 21 aerial victories.

=== Western Front ===
In September 1941, with the exception of 3. Staffel which followed in November, I. Gruppe of JG 3 was transferred from the Eastern Front to Germany for rest and re-supply. In November 1941, it was transferred to the northern Netherlands and on 15 January 1942 re-designated II. Gruppe of Jagdgeschwader 1 (JG 1—1st Fighter Wing) in Katwijk. In consequence, 1. Staffel of JG 3 became the 4. Staffel of JG 1, 2. Staffel of JG 3 became the 5. Staffel of JG 1, and 3. Staffel of JG 3 became the 6. Staffel of JG 1.

Hahn commanded II. Gruppe of JG 1 until June 1942 when he was temporarily replaced by Oberleutnant Detlev Rohwer. Hahn had been relieved of command and placed under arrest for three weeks. He had been accused of maltreatment of a subordinated soldier, a sentry at the base of II. Gruppe. Command of the Gruppe was briefly given to Oberleutnant Max Bucholz before Rohwer took command on 20 June.

=== Luftwaffe staff positions ===
In Oktober 1942, Hahn was appointed Ia (operations officer) on the staff of Oberstleutnant Gotthardt Handrick, the commander of Jagdgeschwader 5 (JG 5—5th Fighter Wing). In July 1943, Hahn was appointed Geschwaderkommodore (wing commander) of Jagdgeschwader 103 (JG 103—103rd Fighter Wing), a fighter pilot training unit.

On 30 November 1944, Hahn attended a meeting held by the Inspector of Day Fighters, Oberst Günther Lützow at the Altemburg Airfield. Lützow had invited the commanding officers of various Luftwaffe training units to discuss the status of fighter pilot training. Among others, the meeting was attended by Karl-Heinz Schnell, Gerhard Koall, Reinhard Seiler, Rolf Hermichen and Josef Fözö. In April 1945, Hahn was appointed Jagdfliegerführer Oberitalien (Fighter Leader Northern Italy), a position he held until the end of World War II in Europe in May 1945.

== Later life ==
Hahn died on 5 November 1957 at the age of 43 in his hometown Frankfurt am Maim, West Germany.

== Summary of career ==
=== Aerial victory claims ===
According to Obermaier, Hahn was credited with 34 aerial victories claimed in over 300 combat missions. This figure includes 19 claims on the Eastern Front and 15 over the Western Allies. Mathews and Foreman, authors of Luftwaffe Aces — Biographies and Victory Claims, researched the German Federal Archives and found records for 31 aerial victory claims, plus three further unconfirmed claims. This figure of confirmed claims includes 19 aerial victories on the Eastern Front and 12 on the Western Front.

Chronicle of aerial victories
This and the – (dash) indicates unconfirmed aerial victory claims for which Hahn did not receive credit.
Claim	Date	Time	Type	Location	Claim	Date	Time	Type	Location
– 8. Staffel of Jagdgeschwader 53 – "Phoney War" — 26 September 1939 – 9 May 1940
1	22 December 1939	15:05	Hurricane	15 km (9.3 mi) northeast of Metz					
– 8. Staffel of Jagdgeschwader 53 – Battle of France — 10 May – 25 June 1940
2	21 May 1940	19:10	LeO 451	Châlons	4	31 May 1940	19:08	Curtiss	Abbeville
—	21 May 1940	—	M.S.406	east of Paris	5	3 June 1940	14:35	Hurricane	Paris
—	21 May 1940	—	Curtiss	east of Paris	—	3 June 1940	—	M.S.406	Paris
3	24 May 1940	18:15	Curtiss		6	7 June 1940	16:53	M.S.406	Compiègne
– 8. Staffel of Jagdgeschwader 53 – Battle of Britain and on the English Channel — 26 June – 26 August 1940
7	25 August 1940	18:27	Spitfire	10 km (6.2 mi) east of Portland					
– Stab I. Gruppe of Jagdgeschwader 3 – Battle of Britain and on the English Channel — 27 August 1940 – 9 June 1941
8	5 September 1940	—	Spitfire	vicinity of London	11	7 October 1940	—	Hurricane	Thames Estuary
9	15 September 1940	—	Spitfire	north of London	12	10 January 1941	14:35	Blenheim	25 km (16 mi) northeast of Nieuwpoort
10	7 October 1940	—	Hurricane	Thames Estuary					
– Stab I. Gruppe of Jagdgeschwader 3 – Operation Barbarossa — 22 June – 16 September 1941
13	25 June 1941	15:10	I-153	20 km (12 mi) northeast of Dubno	23	10 July 1941	15:15	SB-2	4 km (2.5 mi) south of Barbolok
14	26 June 1941	06:10	DB-3	northeast of Brody	24	12 July 1941	14:55	DB-3	15 km (9.3 mi) east of Zhytomyr
15	26 June 1941	06:15	DB-3	northeast of Brody	25	14 July 1941	14:30	DB-3	30 km (19 mi) southwest of Berdychiv
16	26 June 1941	14:20	SB-2	Szczurowcze	26	14 July 1941	14:31	DB-3	30 km (19 mi) southwest of Berdychiv
17	29 June 1941	15:00	I-153	12 km (7.5 mi) west of Brody	27	14 July 1941	14:32	DB-3	30 km (19 mi) southwest of Berdychiv
18	29 June 1941	15:05	I-153	12 km (7.5 mi) west of Brody	28	11 August 1941	06:45	SB-2	6 km (3.7 mi) southeast of Wihenkij
19	5 July 1941	11:45	Pe-2	northwest of Gudnow	29	11 August 1941	06:48	SB-2	6 km (3.7 mi) west of Boryspil
20	6 July 1941	15:40	DB-3	southeast of Shepetivka	30	14 August 1941	12:50	I-16	10 km (6.2 mi) southeast of Kaniv
21	6 July 1941	15:45	DB-3	southeast of Shepetivka	31	16 August 1941	10:00	I-17 (MiG-1)	3 km (1.9 mi) southwest of Kaniv
22	10 July 1941	15:10	I-17 (MiG-1)	10 km (6.2 mi) south of Kurin					

=== Awards ===
- Iron Cross (1939) 2nd and 1st Class
- Knight's Cross of the Iron Cross on 9 July 1941 as Hauptmann and Gruppenkommandeur of the I./Jagdgeschwader 3

== Notes ==
Military offices
Preceded by Oberleutnant Lothar Keller	Commander of I. Gruppe of Jagdgeschwader 3; 27 August 1940 – 1 March 1942	Succeeded by Hauptmann Georg Michalek
Preceded by None	Commander of II. Gruppe of Jagdgeschwader 1; 15 January 1942 – June 1942	Succeeded by Oberleutnant Detlev Rohwer
Preceded by Major Herbert Ihlefeld	Commander of Jagdgeschwader 103; 21 July 1943 – 15 March 1945	Succeeded by None
Preceded by Oberst Eduard Neumann	Commander of Jagdfliegerführer Oberitalien; April 1945 – 8 May 1945	Succeeded by None
