= Heinz Bretnütz =

German World War II flying ace

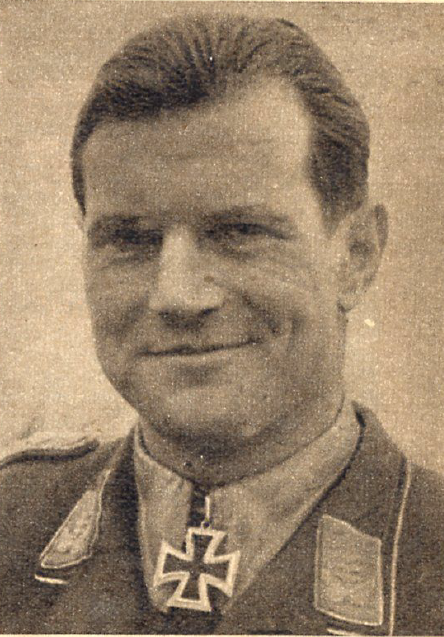
- Bretnütz as a Hauptmann
- Born: 24 January 1914; Mannheim
- Died: 27 June 1941 (aged 27); German field hospital in Jurbarkas, Lithuania
- Burial place: Mannheim main cemetery
- Military career
- Allegiance: Nazi Germany
- Branch: Luftwaffe
- Service years: 1932–1941
- Rank: Hauptmann (captain)
- Nickname: "Pietzsch"
- Units: Condor Legion; JG 53
- Commands: 6./JG 53, II./JG 53
- Conflicts: See battles Spanish Civil War World War II: Phoney War; Battle of France; Battle of Britain; Operation Barbarossa
- Awards: Spanish Cross in Gold with Swords; Knight's Cross of the Iron Cross

Heinz "Pietzsch" Bretnütz (24 January 1914 – 27 June 1941) was a German Luftwaffe ace and recipient of the Knight's Cross of the Iron Cross during World War II. The Knight's Cross of the Iron Cross, and its variants were the highest awards in the military and paramilitary forces of Nazi Germany during World War II.

== Early life and career ==
Bretnütz was born on 24 January 1914 in Mannheim in the Grand Duchy of Baden within the Weimar Republic. He was the first of three children of Paul Gustav Bretnütz, a civil engineer, and his wife Elisabeth née Böttger who gave him the name Heinz Robert Wilhelm Bretnütz. Bretnütz had a younger brother Dieter, born in 1916 who died in 1918, his father died in 1925. In 1929, Bretnütz graduated from the Realgymnasium, a secondary school built on the mid-level Realschule.

In 1932, he joined the military service of the Reichswehr, the German armed forces during the Weimar Republic. In 1935, Bretnütz transferred to the newly formed Luftwaffe and received flight and fighter pilot training at Döberitz. (Note: Flight training in the Luftwaffe progressed through the levels A1, A2 and B1, B2, referred to as A/B flight training. A training included theoretical and practical training in aerobatics, navigation, long-distance flights and dead-stick landings. The B courses included high-altitude flights, instrument flights, night landings and training to handle the aircraft in difficult situations.) Here, Bretnütz befriended Horst Lehmann. On 2 February 1937, Lehmann introduced Bretnütz to Martha Urban, the two were engaged the same year. On 1 July 1937, he was promoted to Leutnant (second lieutenant). Following the creation of I. Gruppe (1st group) of Jagdgeschwader 334 (JG 334—334th Fighter Wing) at Mannheim-Sandhofen Airfield in 1937, Bretnütz was posted to 1. Staffel (1st squadron) of JG 334 under command of Oberleutnant Werner Mölders.

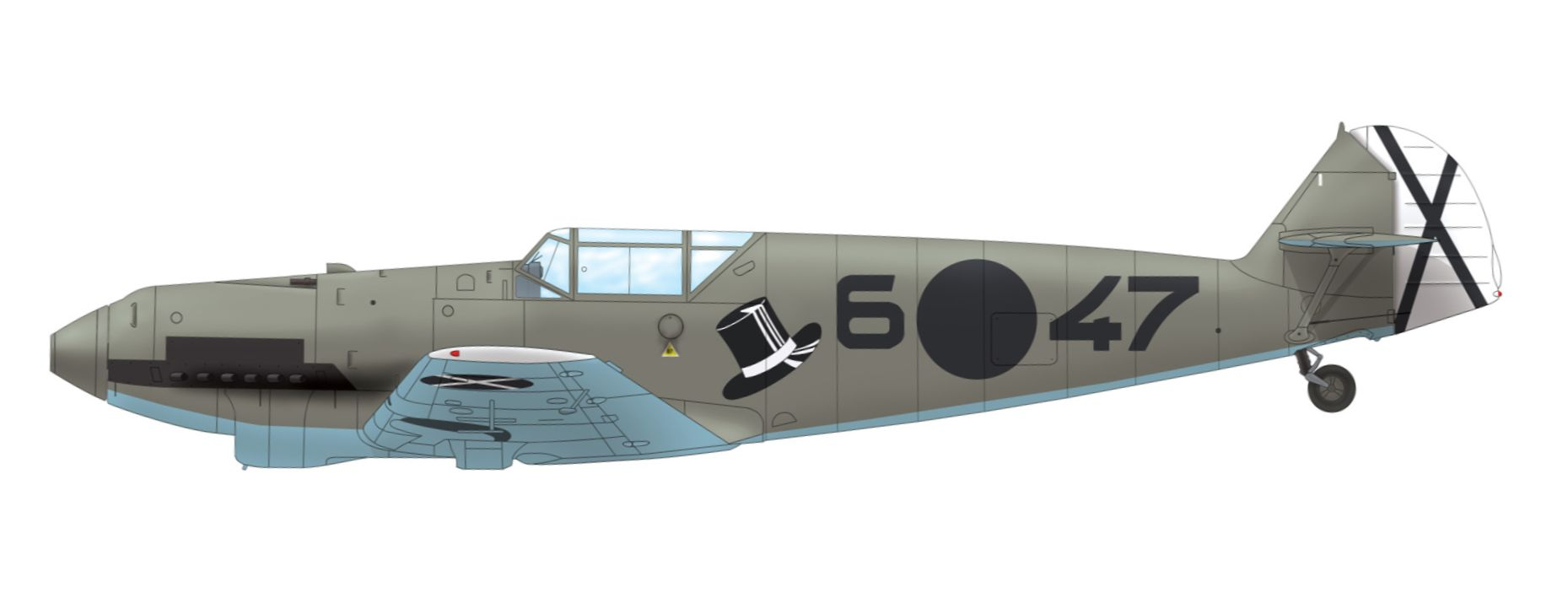
A Bf 109C-1 of 2. Staffel of J/88

Bretnütz volunteered for service in the Condor Legion during the Spanish Civil War. From late 1938 until March 1938, Bretnütz served with 2. Staffel of Jagdgruppe 88 (J/88—88th Fighter Group) under the command of Oberleutnant Joachim Schlichting. In Spain, he claimed two aerial victories, a Polikarpov I-15 fighter on 6 November 1938, and a Tupolev SB-2 bomber on 28 December. For his service in the Spanish Civil War, Bretnütz was later awarded the Spanish Cross in Gold with Swords (Spanienkreuz in Gold mit Schwertern) on 14 April 1939. Following his return to Germany, Bretnütz was promoted to Oberleutnant (first lieutenant), the promotion backdated to 20 April 1938.

Bretnütz was then transferred to II. Gruppe of Jagdgeschwader 53 (JG 53—53rd Fighter Wing) where he was assigned to 6. Staffel. During his service in Spain on 1 November 1938, II. Gruppe of JG 334 had been renamed to II. Gruppe of Jagdgeschwader 133 which then became the II. Gruppe of JG 53 on 1 May 1939. Bretnütz and Martha Urban married on 24 June. On 19 August, Bretnütz was appointed Staffelkapitän (squadron leader) of 6. Staffel of JG 53. He replaced Hauptmann Günther Freiherr von Maltzahn who was placed in command on II. Gruppe.

== World War II ==
World War II in Europe began on Friday, 1 September 1939, when German forces invaded Poland. At the time, JG 53 was tasked with patrolling Germany's western border between Trier and Saarbrücken in what would be dubbed the "Phoney War" period of World War II. On 25 September 1939, Bretnütz led 6. Staffel on a mission which intercepted French Curtiss P-36 Hawk fighters, escorting a reconnaissance aircraft, near Bad Bergzabern. In this encounter, 6. Staffel pilots claimed three P-36 fighters shot down, including one by Bretnütz, for the loss of one pilot killed in action and two Messerschmitt Bf 109 fighters returning with significant combat damage. On 27 September, Bretnütz was awarded the Iron Cross 2nd Class (Eisernes Kreuz zweiter Klasse). On 31 March 1940, Bretnütz claimed two Morane-Saulnier M.S.406 fighters near Saargemünd during an afternoon aerial encounter and a Vickers Wellington bomber that evening. He was then promoted to Hauptmann (captain), the promotion backdated to 19 August 1939.

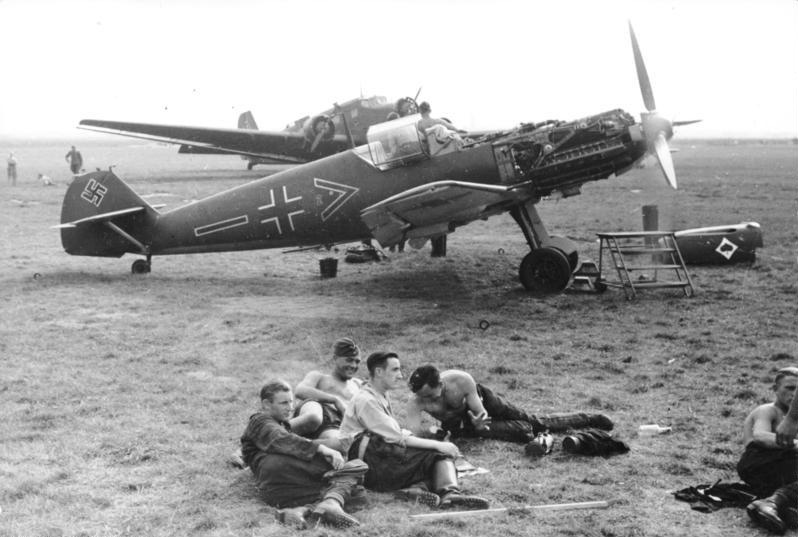
A Messerschmitt Bf 109 E-1's of JG 53, similar to those flown by Bretnütz

During the Battle of Britain, he was one of the most successful Luftwaffe fighter pilots. On 16 August, Bretnütz claimed two Hawker Hurricane fighters shot down. One of the Hurricanes was probably flown by Flight Lieutenant James Brindley Nicolson who was shot that day and Pilot Officer Martyn King.

On 9 October 1940, Bretnütz was appointed Gruppenkommandeur (group commander) of II. Gruppe of JG 53, again succeeding Maltzahn who was appointed Geschwaderkommodore (wing commander) of JG 53. In consequence, command of 6. Staffel was passed to Oberleutnant Otto Böhner. On 20 October, Bretnütz made a forced landing in his Bf 109 E-7 (Werknummer 4112—factory number) near Saint-Inglevert following damage sustained during aerial combat. That day, he had claimed a Hawker Hurricane fighter shot dow, his twentieth aerial victory of World War II. On 22 October, Bretnütz was awarded the Knight's Cross of the Iron Cross (Ritterkreuz des Eisernen Kreuzes), making him the third recipient of this award within JG 53, after Mölders and Hauptmann Hans-Karl Mayer, and the twenty-fifth within the Jagdwaffe (fighter force). Two days later, he traveled to the headquarters of Hermann Göring, the Commander-in-Chief of the Oberkommando der Luftwaffe (Air Force High Command), for the presentation of the Knight's Cross. Bretnütz was then granted home-leave which he spent with his wife in Mannheim.

The Gruppe was withdrawn from the Channel Front on 20 December 1940 and transferred to Köln-Butzweilerhof Airfield for a period of rest and replenishment. On 2 March 1941, the Gruppe received a full complement of factory new Bf&109 F-1 and F-2 aircraft. Following conversion training, the Gruppe redeployed to the English Channel on 12 March where they were based at an airfield near Arques.

=== Operation Barbarossa and death ===
The bulk of the Geschwader's air elements were moved via Jever, in northern Germany, to Mannheim-Sandhofen Airfield on 8 June 1941. There the aircraft were given a maintenance overhaul prior to moving east. The II. Gruppe was transferred to Neusiedel in East Prussia, present-day Malomožaiskojė in Kaliningrad Oblast in Russia, between 12 and 14 June.

On 22 June 1941, the first day of the invasion, Bretnütz claimed a Soviet Tupolev SB-2 twin-engine bomber shot down. In this aerial battle, his Bf 109 F-2 (Werknummer 6674) was hit by the bombers return fire, damaging the aircraft and injuring him. Bretnütz managed to make an emergency landing between Eržvilkas and Nemakščiai. While his aircraft was later recovered, Bretnütz succumbed to his injuries on 27 June 1941. Bretnütz had landed behind enemy lines and was recovered and hidden by the local population. After advancing German troops had occupied the territory, he was taken to a field hospital at Jurbarkas where his leg was amputated. Due to complications and tetanus infection, he died on 27 June 1941. He was initially buried at the German war cemetery in Insterburg, present-day Chernyakhovsk. His mother and wife later travelled to Insterburg and had his body cremated, taking his remains to Mannheim where he was reinterred on the family grave. Bretnütz was succeeded by Hauptmann Walter Spies as commander of II. Gruppe of JG 53.

== Summary of career ==
=== Aerial victory claims ===
According to Obermaier, Bretnütz was credited with 37 aerial victories, two in the Spanish Civil War, and 34 on the Western Front, and one on the Eastern Front of World War II. Additionally, he Bretnütz he destroyed 12 barrage balloons over England. In total, Bretnütz flew 244 combat missions. Mathews and Foreman, authors of Luftwaffe Aces — Biographies and Victory Claims, researched the German Federal Archives and found documentation for 32 aerial victory claims, plus one further unconfirmed claim. This number of confirmed claims includes two claims during the Spanish Civil War and 30 over the Western Allies.

Chronicle of aerial victories
This and the ? (exclamation mark) indicates information discrepancies listed by Prien, Stemmer, Rodeike, Bock, Mathews, and Foreman.
Claim	Date	Time	Type	Location	Claim	Date	Time	Type	Location
Spanish Civil War
– 2. Staffel of Jagdgruppe 88 – Spanish Civil War — November – December 1938
1	6 November 1938	—	Curtiss		2	28 December 1938	—	SB-2	
World War II
– 6. Staffel of Jagdgeschwader 53 – "Phoney War" — 1 September 1939 – 9 May 1940
1? (Note: This claim is not listed by Mathews and Foreman.)	20 September 1939	09:55	barrage balloon		4	31 March 1940	15:57	M.S.406	southwest of Saargemünd
2	25 September 1939	12:20	P-36	south of Bienwald	5	31 March 1940	20:00	Wellington	
3	31 March 1940	15:55	M.S.406	southwest of Saargemünd					
– 6. Staffel of Jagdgeschwader 53 – Battle of France — 10 May – 25 June 1940
6	12 May 1940	12:00	Potez 63	Luxembourg	8	25 May 1940	20:02	M.S.406	
7	21 May 1940	11:14	Potez 63	east of Montmédy	9	7 June 1940	07:05	MB.151	east of Compiègne
– 6. Staffel of Jagdgeschwader 53 – At the Channel and over England — 26 June – 9 October 1940
10	8 August 1940	17:15	Spitfire	south of Swanage	14	16 August 1940	14:37	Hurricane	
11	15 August 1940	18:45	Spitfire	southwest of Portland	15	5 September 1940	16:05	Spitfire	Hawkinge
12	15 August 1940	19:02	Spitfire	15–20 km (9.3–12.4 mi) southwest of Portland	16	6 September 1940	10:16? (Note: According to Mathews and Foreman claimed at 10:18.)	Hurricane	south of London
13	16 August 1940	14:36	Hurricane		17	5 October 1940	12:40	Hurricane	Maidstone
– Stab II. Gruppe of Jagdgeschwader 53 – At the Channel and over England — 9 October 1940 – 8 June 1941
18	11 October 1940	08:55	Spitfire		25	30 November 1940	15:23	Hurricane	Ashford
19	12 October 1940	17:33	Spitfire		26	30 November 1940	15:25	Hurricane	Ashford
20	20 October 1940	16:25	Hurricane		27	19 March 1941	17:20	Spitfire	north of Dungeness
21	8 November 1940	14:58? (Note: According to Mathews and Foreman claimed at 14:50.)	Hurricane	20 km (12 mi) northeast of Brighton	28	9 April 1941	19:10? (Note: According to Mathews and Foreman claimed at 19:12.)	Spitfire	east of Southend
22	8 November 1940	17:37	Spitfire	Thames Estuary	29	3 May 1941	17:03	Spitfire	Dungeness
23	11 November 1940	13:15	Hurricane		30	4 May 1941	12:53? (Note: According to Mathews and Foreman claimed at 12:55.)	Lysander	north of Deal
24	15 November 1940	14:10	Lysander		31	17 May 1941	19:18	Hurricane	30 km (19 mi) south of Harwich
– Stab II. Gruppe of Jagdgeschwader 53 – Operation Barbarossa — 22 June 1941
32? (Note: According to Mathews and Foreman this claim is unconfirmed.)	22 June 1941	—	SB-2	Grodno/Riga area					

=== Awards ===
- Spanish Medalla de la Campaña (4 May 1939)
- Spanish Cruz de Guerra (4 May 1939)
- Spanish Cross in Gold with Swords (6 June 1939) (Note: According to Mathews and Foreman on 14 April 1939.)
- Iron Cross (1939)
  - 2nd Class (27 September 1939)
  - 1st Class (8 May 1940)
- Knight's Cross of the Iron Cross on 21 October 1940 as Hauptmann and Gruppenkommandeur of II./Jagdgeschwader 53 (Note: According to Scherzer on 22 October 1940.)
- Front Flying Clasp of the Luftwaffe in Gold for fighter pilots (1941)

=== Date of Rank ===
1 December 1934:	Unteroffizier (Sergeant)
1935:	Fahnenjunker (Officer Cadet)
1 July 1937:	Leutnant (Second Lieutenant)
20 April 1938:	Oberleutnant (First Lieutenant)
19 August 1939:	Hauptmann (Captain)

== Notes ==
Military offices
Preceded by Major Günther Freiherr von Maltzahn	Commander of II./Jagdgeschwader 53; 9 October 1940 – 27 June 1941	Succeeded by Hauptmann Walter Spies
