= Günther Freiherr von Maltzahn =

German World War II flying ace

- Maltzahn as a Major
- Born: 20 October 1910; Wodarg, Province of Pomerania
- Died: 24 June 1953 (aged 42); Düsseldorf
- Relatives: Helmuth von Maltzahn (grandfather)
- Military career
- Allegiance: Nazi Germany
- Branch: Luftwaffe
- Service years: 1931–1945
- Rank: Oberst (Colonel)
- Units: JG 134, JG 53
- Commands: JG 53
- Conflicts: See battles World War II: Battle of France; Battle of Britain; Operation Barbarossa; Mediterranean Theatre
- Awards: Knight's Cross of the Iron Cross with Oak Leaves

Günther Freiherr von Maltzahn (20 October 1910 – 24 June 1953) was a German military aviator and wing commander in the Luftwaffe during World War II. As a fighter ace, he was credited with 68 enemy aircraft shot down in 497 combat missions. He claimed 34 aerial victories over the Eastern Front and 34 aerial victories over the Western Front, including one four-engine bomber. He was awarded the Knight's Cross of the Iron Cross with Oak Leaves, which was Germany's highest military decoration at the time of its presentation to Maltzahn.

== Early life and career ==
Maltzahn was born on 20 October 1910 in Wodarg, present-day a borough of Werder in Mecklenburg-Vorpommern, at the time a Province of Pomerania as part of the German Empire. According to Bryan Mark Rigg, Maltzahn was a quarter-Jew by the Nuremberg Laws. (Note: see also German Jewish military personnel of World War II) He was the third of six sons and twelve children in total of Gerhard von Maltzahn-Wodarg and his mother Helene von Borcke auf Demnitz und Millnitz. (Note: Three of his brothers were killed during World War II, in addition, his father was executed by Soviet troops in 1945.) His father was the youngest child of Helmuth von Maltzahn, a German finance minister and a representative in the Reichstag. Aged eleven, Maltzahn attended the Lilienthal-Gymnasium, a secondary school, where he graduated with his Abitur (diploma).

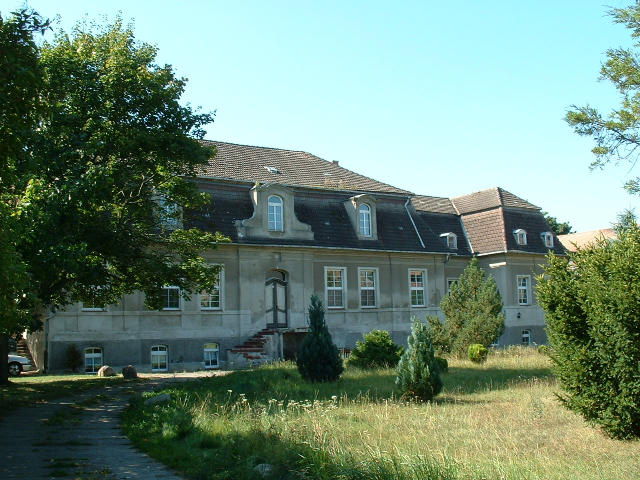
Manor in Wodarg

On 1 April 1931, he was accepted for military in the Reichswehr. However, Maltzahn did not join the cavalry regiment in Pasewalk, for one year, he trained as a pilot disguised as a civilian. In October 1932, Maltzahn attended the Military School Dresden. Among his classmates were Werner Mölders, Hubertus von Bonin, Joachim Pötter, Hans-Henning Freiherr von Beust, Arved Crüger, Gerhard Kollewe and Wolfgang Schellmann.

On 1 March 1934, Maltzahn was promoted to Leutnant (second lieutenant) and began his service with the 4. and 2. Schwadron of 6. (Preußisch) Reiter-Regiment (4th and 2nd squadron of the 6th Prussian Cavalry Regiment) based in Pasewalk. On 1 October, he was transferred to the cavalry regiment in Schwedt, which was later renamed Kavallerie-Regiment 6 and was subordinated to the 1st Cavalry Division. Maltzahn transferred to the newly formed Luftwaffe on 1 April 1935. There, he was promoted to Oberleutnant (first lieutenant) on 1 October and until 1 April 1936 received further flight training at the flight schools at Kitzingen and Würzburg. On 15 March 1937, Maltzahn was posted to the II. Gruppe (2nd group) of Jagdgeschwader 334 (JG 334—334th Fighter Wing). There, Maltzahn was appointed Staffelkapitän (squadron leader) of the newly created 6.(leichte Jäger) Staffel (6th light fighter squadron) of JG 334. On 1 November 1938, JG 334 was renamed and became Jagdgeschwader 133 (JG 133—133rd Fighter Wing). In consequence, Maltzahn then commanded the 6. Staffel of JG 133. On 1 April 1939, the unit was again renamed and from then on was referred to as Jagdgeschwader 53 (JG 53—53rd Fighter Wing). The Gruppe was based at Mannheim-Sandhofen Airfield and initially equipped with the Arado Ar 68 E and later with the Messerschmitt Bf 109 B and Bf 109 D-1 variant. On 19 August, Maltzahn was appointed Gruppenkommandeur (group commander) of II. Gruppe of JG 53. He succeeded Major Hubert Merhart von Bernegg who was transferred. In consequence, command of 6. Staffel was passed on to Oberleutnant Heinz Bretnütz.

== World War II ==
World War II in Europe began on Friday, 1 September 1939, when German forces invaded Poland. At the time, JG 53 was tasked with patrolling Germany's western border between Trier and Saarbrücken in what would be dubbed the "Phoney War" period of World War II. On 30 September, flying his 16th combat mission of the war, Maltzahn claimed his first aerial victory when he shot down a French Potez 630 bomber. For this, he was awarded the Iron Cross 2nd Class (Eisernes Kreuz zweiter Klasse) on 7 October 1939. Aerial combat with French Morane-Saulnier M.S.406 fighters on 31 March 1940 near Saargemünd resulted in his second victory claim. On 4 May, Maltzahn made a forced landing in his Bf 109 E-1 east of Glauberg. He then walked to Düdelsheim, present-day part of Büdingen, where he was taken to Count Karl-Friedrich of Isenburg where he spent the night.

On 10 May, German forces launched the invasion of France and the Low Countries (Fall Gelb). During the campaign, JG 53 was subordinated to Luftflotte 3 (Air Fleet 3) commanded by General der Flieger Hugo Sperrle. That day, Maltzahn was awarded the Iron Cross 1st Class (Eisernes Kreuz erster Klasse). On 15 May, his Bf 109 E-3 (Werknummer 1347—factory number) suffered undercarriage failure during landing at Dockendorf, nearly destroying the aircraft. Following the German advance into France, II. Gruppe moved to an airfield at Vraux on 15 June. On 22 June, the Gruppe moved to Dinan, located approximately 30 kilometers (19 miles) northwest of Rennes. Following the Armistice of 22 June 1940, hostilities stopped on 25 June.

=== Battle of Britain ===
In July 1940, the Luftwaffe began a series of air operations dubbed Kanalkampf (Channel Battle) over the English Channel against the RAF, which marked the beginning of the Battle of Britain. On 8 August 1940, during an attack on Convoy Peewit, Maltzahn claimed an aerial victory over a Supermarine Spitfire fighter. On 16 August, the Luftwaffe flew 399 bomber and 1,314 fighter missions over Britain. That day, Maltzahn claimed another Spitfire fighter, his fourth aerial victory in total. Flying a bomber escorting mission on 1 September, Maltzahn claimed his fifth aerial victory. On 5 September, he claimed a Spitfire fighter in the afternoon. The following day, Maltzahn shot down a Hawker Hurricane fighter while escorting Luftwaffe bombers returning from an attack on London.

On 7 September, the Luftwaffe shifted their attacks towards London, systematically bombing the city in what was dubbed The Blitz. On 24 September, Maltzahn claimed a Spitfire fighter near Southampton for his eighth aerial victory. On two separate missions flown on 27 September, he claimed two further Spitfire fighters shot down, taking his total to ten aerial victories.

=== Wing commander ===
JG 53 insignia

On 9 October, Maltzahn was appointed Geschwaderkommodore (wing commander) of JG 53. He replaced Major Hans-Jürgen von Cramon-Taubadel who was transferred to the Reichsluftfahrtministerium (RLM—Ministry of Aviation). Then Hauptmann Bretnütz replaced him as commander of II. Gruppe. Maltzahn left II. Gruppe on 10 October and headed to Étaples where the Geschwaderstab (headquarters unit) was based. On 15 November, JG 53 claimed their 501st aerial victory in total. This earned Maltzahn a named reference in the Wehrmachtbericht on 18 November.

The Geschwaderstab of JG 53 was withdrawn from the Channel Front on 21 December 1940 and transferred to Köln-Butzweilerhof Airfield for a period of rest and replenishment. During this period, Maltzahn was awarded the Knight's Cross of the Iron Cross (Ritterkreuz des Eisernen Kreuzes) on 30 December. In early February 1941, training on the Bf 109 E series commenced again. The Stab received the first Bf 109 F-2 aircraft on 18 February. On 15 March, the Geschwaderstab returned to the English Channel where they were based at Saint-Omer-Wizernes.

On 31 March, Maltzahn claimed his 13th aerial victory when he shot down a Spitfire fighter. When on 16 February, six Bristol Blenheim bombers and their escorting fighters attacked the Luftwaffe airfield at Berck-sur-Mer, Maltzahn claimed a Spitfire fighter shot down. JG 53 was finally withdrawn from the Channel Front on 8 June 1941 and ordered to Mannheim-Sandhofen Airfield in preparation of Operation Barbarossa, the German invasion of the Soviet Union. The Geschwaderstab then moved to Krzewica, located approximately 70 kilometers (43 miles) west of Brest, on 14 June. Here, JG 53 was subordinated to Luftflotte 2 (Air Fleet 2) and was deployed on the right flank of Army Group Centre.

Maltzahn was awarded the Knight's Cross of the Iron Cross with Oak Leaves (Ritterkreuz des Eisernen Kreuzes mit Eichenlaub) on 24 July 1941. By this date, he had accumulated 42 aerial victories and was the 29th member of the German armed forces to be so honored. The presentation was made by Adolf Hitler at the Führer Headquarter Wolfsschanze (Wolf's Lair), Hitler's headquarters in Rastenburg, now Kętrzyn in Poland. Two other Luftwaffe officers were presented with awards that day by Hitler, Major Günther Lützow and Major Josef Priller were also awarded the Oak Leaves. On 6 August, the Geschwaderstab was withdrawn from Bila Tserkva on the Eastern Front, returning to Germany for further deployment on the Western Front.

=== Malta and North Africa ===
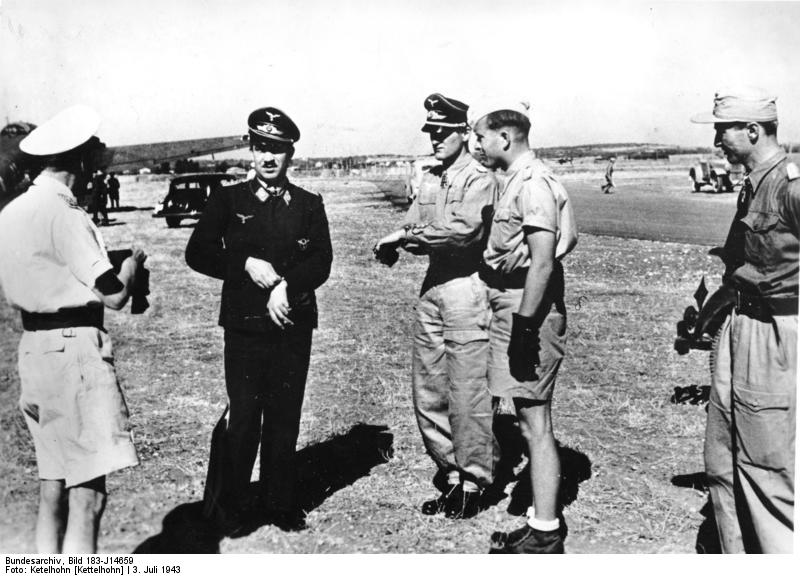
von Maltzahn in Italy, July 1943

The ground personnel of JG 53 began their relocation to Sicily in late November 1941. The Geschwaderstab followed on 13 December via Mannheim-Sandhofen, Munich-Riem, Naples, finally arriving at Comiso Airfield on 15 December. On 19 December 1941, the Geschwaderstab of JG 53 flew its first combat mission during the Siege of Malta. On this mission, Maltzahn claimed his 50th aerial victory when he shot down a Hawker Hurricane fighter. On 25 January 1942, Maltzahn claimed his 54th and 55th aerial victory. That day, Royal Air Force (RAF) fighters escorted supply shipping and destroyers from Force K. As the ships passed the Delimara peninsula, located on the edge of the Marsaxlokk Bay, they came under attack by four Junkers Ju 88 bombers escorted by five Bf 109s from the Geschwaderstab. In this encounter, Luftwaffe pilots claimed eight aerial victories, including two by Maltzahn. The RAF squadrons lost three of five Hurricane fighters from No. 185 Squadron, No. 126 Squadron lost two aircraft, No. 249 Squadron sustained one loss, and No. 242 Squadron suffered three losses.

In 1942, Maltzahn was diagnosed with lymphoma. He received radiation therapy at the Charité in Berlin and remained free of further symptoms until the end of World War II. In 1943, Maltzahn became part of the inner circle of Enno von Rintelen, the German military attaché in Italy. Maltzahn was introduced by Friedrich-Karl von Plehwe with whom he had served in the infantry. By June 1943, Maltzahn's health had deteriorated to the point that he could no longer lead JG 53 during combat missions. In consequence, Major Gerhard Michalski, the commander of II. Gruppe, was tasked with leading the air elements of JG 53.

=== Luftwaffe staff positions ===
On 4 October 1943, Maltzahn was relieved of his position as Geschwaderkommodore of JG 53 and posted to the staff of Luftwaffenbefehlshaber Mitte under the command of Generaloberst Hubert Weise, a predecessor of Luftflotte Reich. He was briefly replaced by Major Friedrich-Karl Müller and Major Kurt Ubben as commander of JG 53 before the position was given to Oberstleutnant Helmut Bennemann on 9 November. The commander of Luftflotte 2 (Air Fleet 2), Generalfeldmarschall Wolfram Freiherr von Richthofen, had unsuccessfully tried to retain Maltzahn in Italy. On 4 December, he was appointed Jagdfliegerführer Oberitalien.

On 11 November 1944, Reichsmarschall (Marshal of the Realm) Hermann Göring, in his role as commander-in-chief of the Luftwaffe, organized a meeting of high-ranking Luftwaffe officers, including Maltzahn. The meeting, also referred to as the "Areopag" was held at the Luftkriegsakademie (air war academy) at Berlin-Gatow. This Luftwaffe version of the Greek Areopagus—a court of justice—aimed at finding solutions to the deteriorating air was situation over Germany.

In February 1945, he was detached to 9. Fliegerdivision (J) where he assisted in the conversion training of bomber pilots to fighter pilots.

== Later life ==
After the war Maltzahn worked in agriculture and later took over a winery in the Moselle Valley from a brother-in-law. Maltzahn had a relapse of his 1942 cancer symptoms in 1950, which impaired his ability to speak. Following surgery in 1951, he lived in Bonn and worked for the "Amt Blank", a forerunner of the Ministry of Defence, on the reconstruction of the German Air Force, at the time referred to as the Bundesluftwaffe. He was a candidate for the position of Inspector of the Air Force. By 1953 the Hodgkin's lymphoma had deteriorated his health further, and breathing was very difficult for him. Following further radiation treatment, he required surgery of his infected lung. Maltzahn died on 24 June 1953 in Düsseldorf during the anesthesia prior to the operation. The street "Günther-von-Maltzahn-Straße" in Fürstenfeldbruck was named after him.

== Summary of career ==
=== Aerial victory claims ===
According to US historian David T. Zabecki, Maltzahn was credited with 68 aerial victories. Obermaier also lists him with 68 aerial victories claimed in 497 combat missions, 34 on the Eastern Front and further 34 over the Western Allies, including one four-engined heavy bomber. Mathews and Foreman, authors of Luftwaffe Aces — Biographies and Victory Claims, researched the German Federal Archives and found records for 67 confirmed aerial victory claims, plus three further unconfirmed claims. This figure of confirmed claims includes 33 aerial victories on the Eastern Front and 34 on the Western Front, including one four-engined bomber.

Chronicle of aerial victories
This and the – (dash) indicates unconfirmed aerial victory claims for which Maltzahn did not receive credit. This and the ? (question mark) indicates information discrepancies listed by Prien, Stemmer, Rodeike, Bock, Mathews and Foreman.
Claim	Date	Time	Type	Location	Claim	Date	Time	Type	Location
– Stab II. Gruppe of Jagdgeschwader 53 – "Phoney War" — 1 September 1939 – 9 May 1940
1	30 September 1939	11:34	Potez 63	Saarbrücken	2	31 March 1940	15:53? (Note: According to Mathews and Foreman claimed at 15:55.)	M.S.406	southwest of Saargemünd
– Stab II. Gruppe of Jagdgeschwader 53 – Action at the Channel and over England — 26 June – September 1940
3	8 August 1940	17:05	Spitfire	15 km (9.3 mi) south of Swanage	7	6 September 1940	10:10	Hurricane	
4	16 August 1940	18:10	Spitfire		8	24 September 1940	09:53	Spitfire	southeast of London
5	1 September 1940	12:10	Spitfire		9	27 September 1940	10:19	Spitfire	
6	5 September 1940	16:05	Spitfire		10	27 September 1940	16:25	Spitfire	
– Stab of Jagdgeschwader 53 – Action at the Channel and over England — October – 8 June 1941
11	12 October 1940	17:40	Hurricane		14	16 April 1941	18:40	Spitfire	Dungeness
12	1 December 1940	15:15? (Note: According to Mathews and Foreman claimed at 13:15.)	Hurricane		15	19 April 1941	19:09	Spitfire	Calais/Dover; English Channel
13	31 March 1941	11:35	Spitfire	northwest of Calais	—	9 May 1941	—	Spitfire	north of Calais
– Stab of Jagdgeschwader 53 – Operation Barbarossa — 22 June – 5 December 1941
16	22 June 1941	07:17	I-153	vicinity of Kobryn	33	14 July 1941	11:15	I-16	
17? (Note: According to Mathews and Foreman this claim is unconfirmed.)	22 June 1941	16:30	SB-2	northwest of Brest-Litowsk	34	15 July 1941	06:50	I-15	
18	25 June 1941	12:55	DB-3		35	15 July 1941	06:54	SB-3	
19	25 June 1941	12:57	SB-3		36	16 July 1941	07:50	SB-3	
20	25 June 1941	12:59	SB-3		37	18 July 1941	12:05	SB-3	
21	25 June 1941	13:01	SB-3		38	18 July 1941	12:08	SB-3	
22	27 June 1941	13:45	Pe-2		39	20 July 1941	17:49	I-15	
23	29 June 1941	19:35	SB-3	Bobruysk	40	23 July 1941	06:50	SB-3	north of Uman
—	6 July 1941	—	DB-3		41	23 July 1941	06:59	SB-3	north of Uman
24	7 July 1941	06:14	SB-3	east of Polonnoje	42	24 July 1941	18:12	Pe-2	
25	8 July 1941	18:48	V-11 (Il-2)		43	25 July 1941	18:19? (Note: According to Mathews and Foreman claimed at 18:15.)	Pe-2	east of Bila Tserkva
26	9 July 1941	16:11	DB-3		44	26 July 1941	11:00	V-11 (Il-2)	
27	9 July 1941	16:14	DB-3		45	29 July 1941	17:00	SB-3	
28	10 July 1941	09:35	I-16		46	30 July 1941	18:30? (Note: According to Mathews and Foreman claimed at 18:50.)	SB-3	
29	10 July 1941	09:37	I-16		47	30 July 1941	18:53	Pe-2	
30	10 July 1941	13:55	SB-3		48	31 July 1941	06:25	Pe-2	
31	12 July 1941	18:07	DB-3		49	31 July 1941	06:35	Pe-2	
32	12 July 1941	18:08	DB-3						
– Stab of Jagdgeschwader 53 – Mediterranean Theater — 15 December 1941 – 31 December 1942
50	19 December 1941	16:55	Hurricane	Malta	59	15 February 1942	18:00	Beaufort	
51	21 December 1941	12:00	Hurricane	Malta	60	1 April 1942	14:55	Spitfire	east of Ħal Far
52	26 December 1941	11:12	Hurricane	vicinity of Malta	61	1 April 1942	17:28	Spitfire	Malta
53	26 December 1941	16:55	Hurricane	southeast of Malta	62	14 April 1942	10:40	P-40	
54	25 January 1942	10:35	Hurricane		63	25 April 1942	15:28	Spitfire	Malta
55	25 January 1942	10:40	Hurricane		64	14 June 1942	17:32	Hurricane	vicinity of Malta
56	4 February 1942	15:53	Hurricane	east of Malta	65	3 December 1942	11:38	P-38	Bizerte
57	11 February 1942	15:45	Beaufighter		66	14 December 1942	12:18	Spitfire	Jefna
58	15 February 1942	16:08	Beaufort		67	18 December 1942	12:10	B-17	northwest of Majaz al Bab
– Stab of Jagdgeschwader 53 – Mediterranean Theater — 1 January – 31 December 1943
68	1 April 1943	12:21	Curtiss P-40	5 km (3.1 mi) south of Sbeitla					

=== Awards ===
- Iron Cross (1939)
  - 2nd Class (7 October 1939)
  - 1st Class (10 May 1940)
- German Cross in Gold on 23 December 1942 as Oberstleutnant in Jagdgeschwader 53
- Knight's Cross of the Iron Cross with Oak Leaves
  - Knight's Cross on 30 December 1940 as Major and Gruppenkommandeur of the II./Jagdgeschwader 53
  - 29th Oak Leaves on 24 July 1941 as Major and Geschwaderkommodore of Jagdgeschwader 53

=== Promotions ===
1 March 1934:	Leutnant (Second Lieutenant)
1 October 1935:	Oberleutnant (First Lieutenant)
16 August 1939:	Hauptmann (Captain)
24 October 1940:	Major (Major)
18 June 1942:	Oberstleutnant (Lieutenant Colonel)
1 June 1943:	Oberst (Colonel)

== Notes ==
Military offices
Preceded by Major Hans-Jürgen von Cramon-Taubadel	Commander of Jagdgeschwader 53 Pik As; 9 October 1940 – 4 October 1943	Succeeded by Major Friedrich-Karl Müller
Preceded by unknown	Commander of Jagdfliegerführer Oberitalien; 5 October 1943 – December 1944	Succeeded by Oberst Eduard Neumann
