= Kalletal =

- Municipality
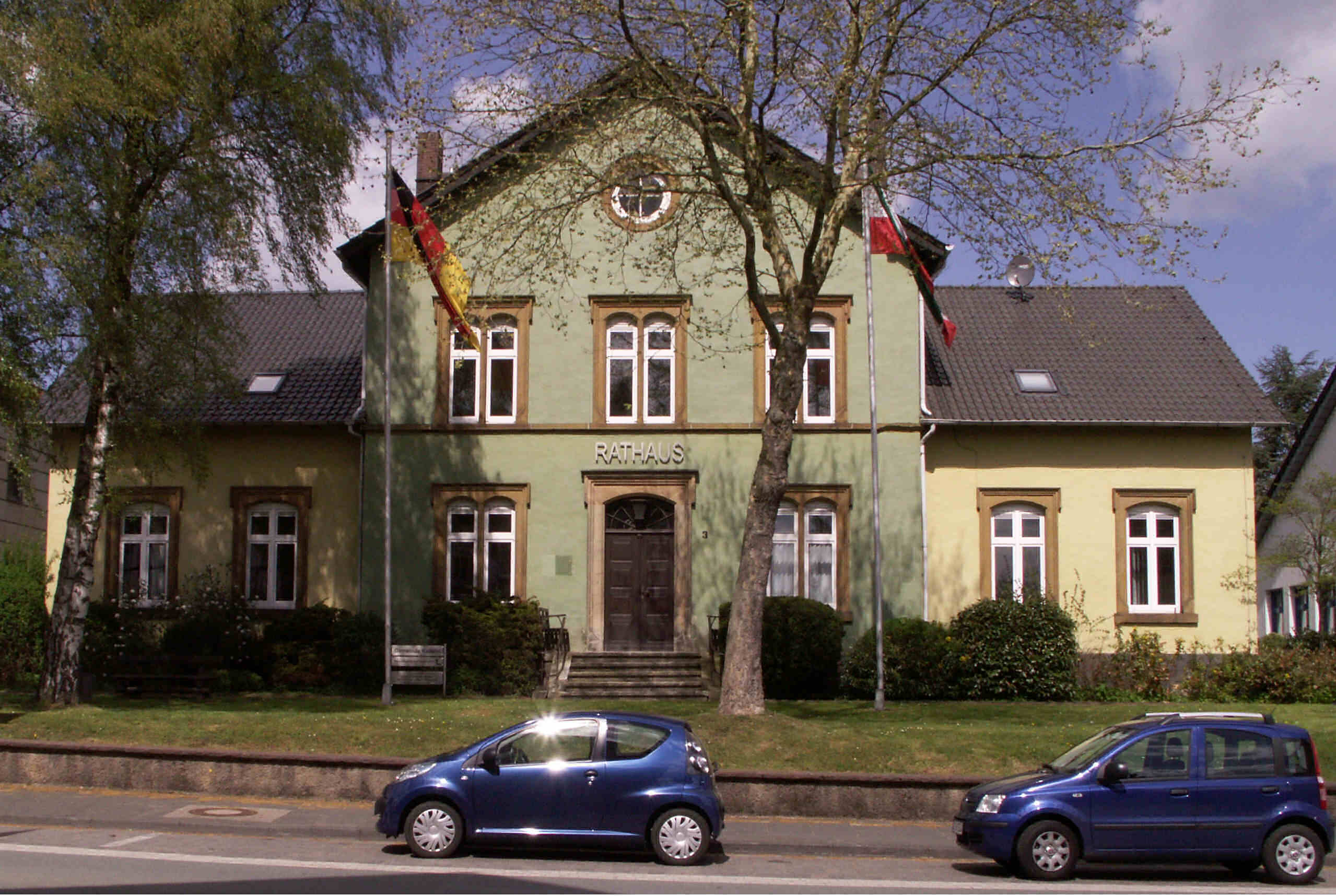
- Town hall

- Coat of arms

- Location of Kalletal within Lippe district
- Interactive map of Kalletal
- Location within Germany Location within North Rhine-Westphalia
- Coordinates: 52°07′00″N 08°56′59″E
- Country: Germany
- State: North Rhine-Westphalia
- Admin. region: Detmold
- District: Lippe

Government
  - Mayor (2020–25): Mario Hecker (Ind.)

Area
  - Total: 112.42 km^{2} (43.41 sq mi)
- Elevation: 214 m (702 ft)

Population (2025-12-31)
  - Total: 13,131
  - Density: 116.80/km^{2} (302.52/sq mi)
- Time zone: UTC+01:00 (CET)
  - Summer (DST): UTC+02:00 (CEST)
- Postal codes: 32689
- Dialling codes: 05264
- Vehicle registration: LIP
- Website: www.kalletal.de

Kalletal (German pronunciation: [ˈkalətaːl], lit. 'Kalle Valley') is a municipality in the Lippe district of North Rhine-Westphalia, Germany, with c. 13,100 inhabitants (2025).

== Comprising villages (Ortschaften) ==
- Asendorf
- Bavenhausen
- Bentorf
- Brosen
- Erder
- Heidelbeck
- Henstorf
- Hohenhausen
- Kalldorf
- Langenholzhausen
- Lüdenhausen
- Osterhagen
- Stemmen
- Talle
- Tevenhausen
- Varenholz
- Westorf

== Population ==
Historical population

| Year | Pop. | ±% p.a. |
|---|---|---|
| 1965 | 13,236 | — |
| 1970 | 14,200 | +1.42% |
| 1975 | 14,623 | +0.59% |
| 1980 | 14,472 | −0.21% |
| 1985 | 13,896 | −0.81% |
| 1990 | 14,522 | +0.89% |
| 1995 | 15,791 | +1.69% |

| Year | Pop. | ±% p.a. |
|---|---|---|
| 2000 | 15,827 | +0.05% |
| 2005 | 15,382 | −0.57% |
| 2010 | 14,514 | −1.15% |
| 2015 | 13,914 | −0.84% |
| 2020 | 13,385 | −0.77% |
| 2025 | 13,131 | −0.38% |

Source: Landesdatabank Nordrhein-Westfalen
