= Jagdgeschwader 53 =

- Active: 1939–1945
- Country: Nazi Germany
- Branch: Luftwaffe
- Type: Fighter Aircraft
- Role: Air superiority
- Size: Air Force Wing
- Nickname: Pik As ("Ace of Spades")
- Engagements: Western Front: Battle of France; Battle of Britain; Eastern Front (World War II): German-Soviet air war 22 June 1941; Operation Barbarossa

Jagdgeschwader 53 (JG 53) was a Luftwaffe fighter-wing of World War II. It operated in Western Europe and in the Mediterranean. Jagdgeschwader 53 - or as it was better known, the "Pik As" (Ace of Spades) Geschwader - was one of the oldest German fighter units of World War II with its origins going back to 1937. JG 53 flew the various models of the Messerschmitt Bf 109 throughout World War II.

== World War II ==
=== Invasion of France; Battle of Britain ===
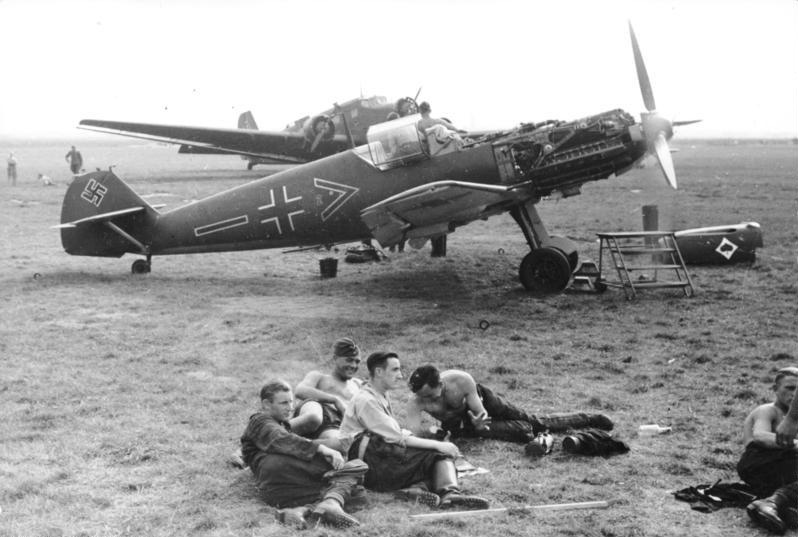
Messerschmitt Bf 109 E-1's of Jagdgeschwader 53 (JG 53) "Pik As" c. 1939/1940

The Geschwader commenced its wartime operations with a high proportion of its personnel experienced ex-Condor Legion pilots including Werner Mölders. On 14 May 1940, JG 53 claimed some 43 victories in one day. The Battle of France thus saw the Geschwader score heavily during May and June 1940, with some 275 claims against Armee de l'Air and Royal Air Force forces. While JG 53 was making a reputation for itself during the Battle of Britain, according to RAF Air Ministry intelligence summary no. 60, Reichsmarschall Hermann Göring was informed that Major Hans-Jürgen von Cramon-Taubadel's wife was Jewish. Göring then ordered the whole of Stabschwarm/JG 53 (Note: See Organization of the Luftwaffe during World War II) to remove the "Pik As" emblem from their planes, and replace it with a red stripe around the engine cowling as punishment. All of Stab./JG 53's planes immediately were stripped of their "Pik As" insignia, and soon after the whole of the Stab./JG 53 had also stripped the swastikas off the tails of their planes in protest.

=== Invasion of the Soviet Union ===
In April 1941 the Geschwader then transferred to the Eastern Front for Operation Barbarossa. Under the control of Luftflotte 2 commanded by Field Marshal Albert Kesselring, the Geschwader, now equipped with the Messerschmitt Bf 109F, flew operations from Warsaw-Bielany. On 31 July 1941 JG 53 shot down its 1,000th aircraft. In the period 22 June 1941 – 5 December 1941 JG 53 claimed to destroy 762 Soviet aircraft, losing 35 in aerial combat, and two on the ground.

=== Mediterranean theatre ===
Later in the year JG 53 moved to bases in Sicily for operations against Malta (though elements also served in the Netherlands from July to November 1941). The III. Gruppe was transferred to North Africa for a short time in December 1941 while the rest of JG 53 was eventually moved to Comiso in Sicily for operations against Malta, which ended in May 1942. In the summer of 1942, II./JG 53 operated from the island of Pantelleria for operations over Malta and as escort missions for attacks on British supply convoys.

In May 1942 after the termination of the German air offensive against the British island fortress of Malta in the face of a strong defence bolstered by Supermarine Spitfires the "Pik As" Geschwader was split up, with its three Gruppen scattered over three theatres of operation. III./JG 53 again saw service in North Africa supporting Rommel's planned advance on Cairo. Stab and II./JG 53 which were left behind on Sicily after the end of the "Malta Blitz" in May for service over the central Mediterranean, and I./JG 53 was moved to the Eastern front, where it was to take part in the German summer offensive in the southern sector aimed at Stalingrad and the Caucasus.

=== Battle of Stalingrad ===
Together with the JG 3 and JG 52, plus Stab and II./JG 77, I./JG 53 was deployed in Luftflotte 4's 8th Air Corps to support Operation Blau. During the period May–September 1942 in the Eastern Front, I./JG 53 claimed 918 victories. It suffered the loss of 34 Bf 109s, 18 pilots killed in action and nine wounded.

During the Battle of Stalingrad, the I./JG 53 faced stiff resistance of the Soviet VVS and PVO both in the air and the ground, and several of the unit's aces were shot down, wounded, captured or killed.

- 30 June 1942: A Yak-1 fighter shot down Leutnant Joachim Louis's Messerschmitt Bf 109, who bailed out and became a POW. Louis had then 22 victories to his credit.
- 8 July 1942: Wilhelm Crinius (then an Unteroffizier with 12 air victories) was shot down by flak over Voronezh at 08:50.
- 6 August 1942: Leutnant Hans Roehrig (flying Bf 109G-2 W.Nr 13480) is forced to bail out by a Yak-1 fighter, apparently flown by Soviet ace Starshiy Leytenant Mikhail Baranov (183 IAP, 269 IAD). (Note: IAP—Istrebitelny Aviatsionny Polk (Fighter Aviation Regiment—Истребительный Авиационный Полк)) At that time Roehrig had under his belt eight out of the 75 victories he would be credited with. Baranov subsequently would shoot down the Ju 87D-3 of Unteroffizier Herbert Oswald (2./StG 2), one of the Stukas the I. Gruppe was escorting.
- 19 August 1942: Walter Zellot's Bf 109 was shot-up by a Soviet fighter, probably the Yak-1 flown by future ace Boris M. Vasilyev (929 IAP).
- 7 September 1942: While escorting a Fw.189A-1 of 4.(H)/10, 10-victories ace Feldwebel Wilhelm Budke was caught by surprise by Soviet Yak-7B ace Amet-khan Sultan (4 IAP), and had to bail out of his Bf 109 G-2 W.Nr. 13680. Amet-Khan's comrade ace Ivan Stepanenko shot up the Fw 189, which was damaged beyond repair (65%) and was scrapped.
- 8 September 1942: 38-victories ace Oberfeldwebel Hans Kornatz was downed and injured in air combat, probably by Spanish Yak-1 pilot José Pascual Santamaría (788 IAP, 102 IAD PVO), who shot down three Bf 109 that day, but was also forced to bail out and died when his parachute failed to open.
- 9 September 1942: 60-kills ace Leutnant Alfred Franke (flying a Bf 109, 2./JG 53) was downed in air combat by Ilyushin Il-2 Shturmovik pilot Pavel S. Vinogradov (694 IAP, 228 ShAD) and was killed in the crash.
- 10 September 1942: three I./JG 53 pilots were killed or wounded over Stalingrad: Unteroffizier Heinrich Wöhrle (10 victories, WIA), Feldwebel Franz Hagedorn (37 victories, killed by another Il-2 Shturmovik) and Leutnant Walter Zellot (86 victories), who was shot down and killed by flak.
- 13 September 1942: While escorting Ju 88s, 11-victories ace Unteroffizier Erwin Meier (2./JG 53) jumped the Yak-1 of female pilot Raisa Belyaeva. However, he was surprised by another Yak-1 flown by future leading female ace Lydia Litvyak and had to bail out of his flaming Bf 109 G-2. He became a POW.

=== North Africa ===
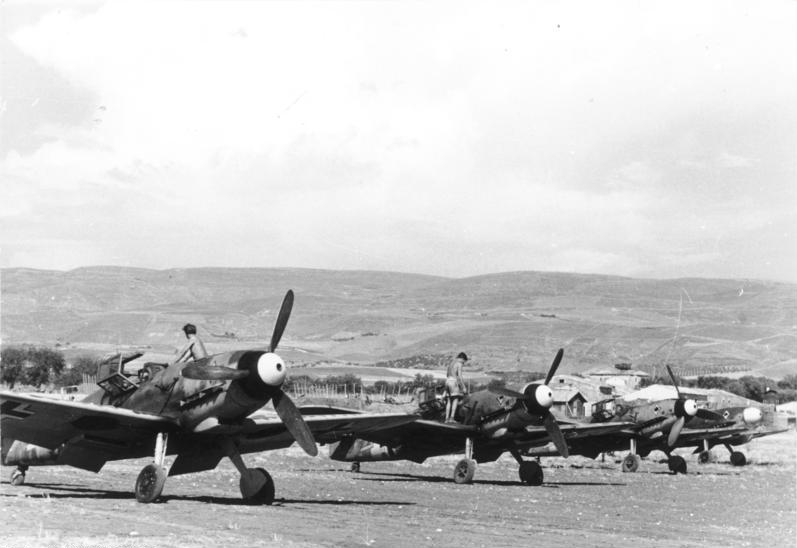
Messerschmitt Bf 109G's of JG 53 in southern Italy

On 1 November 1942, Hauptmann "Tutti" Müller was appointed Gruppenkommandeur of I./JG 53 and led the unit back to the Mediterranean theater. By November 1942 the entire wing was again concentrated on Sicily for an offensive against Malta, an abortive and short-lived blitz foiled by the defenders. During its 1942 operations over North Africa, Sicily and Malta JG 53 had claimed a total of 388 aircraft shot down. Hauptmann Gerhard Michalski claimed 25 over Malta. With the Allied invasion of French North Africa in November, the Geschwader again found its components separated.

=== "Defense of the Reich" ===
II./JG 53 was withdrawn from Italy in October 1943, and was the first squadron of the unit to be employed in the Defense of the Reich operations, stationed near Vienna from October 1943 to March 1944, before moving to south Western Germany. The winter of 1943/44 saw bitter fighting over Italy.

II./JG 53 was the sole squadron employed against the Allied Operation Overlord on 6 June 1944. The Luftwaffe fighter units in France suffered catastrophic losses, and II./JG 53 was no exception. In just one month of operations, the squadron reported 42 aircraft lost through enemy action, 18 in accidents, 20 abandoned and a further 20 through other causes; approximately 200% of its operational strength.

III./JG 53 also returned from Italy in June 1944 and after a short period refitting was active in operations against the Allied forces. When the Allies launched Operation Market Garden, both II. and III./JG53 took part. A new IV. Gruppe was added in the autumn of 1944.

I./JG53 was later moved to Romania to protect the oilfields of Ploiești and also saw further action in Hungary in late 1944 and early 1945 against the Red Army. It retreated into Czechoslovakia and Austria and was disbanded in April 1945. The rest of the unit was disbanded days before VE Day.

== Commanding officers ==
=== Geschwaderkommodore ===
• Oberst Bruno Löerzer	15 March 1937	–	31 March 1938
• Oberstleutnant Werner Junck	1 April 1938	–	30 September 1939
• Major Hans Klein	1 October 1939	–	31 December 1939
• Major Hans-Jürgen von Cramon-Taubadel	1 January 1940	–	30 September 1940
• Oberst Günther Freiherr von Maltzahn	9 October 1940	–	4 October 1943
• Major Friedrich-Karl Müller (acting)	October 1943
• Major Kurt Ubben (acting)	October 1943	–	November 1943
• Oberstleutnant Helmut Bennemann	9 November 1943	–	27 April 1945

=== Gruppenkommandeure ===
I./JG 53

• Hauptmann Lothar von Janson	1 May 1939	–	30 June 1940
• Hauptmann Albert Blumensaat	1 July 1940	–	25 August 1940
• Hauptmann Hans-Karl Mayer	1 September 1940	–	17 October 1940 †
• Hauptmann Hans-Heinrich Brustellin	October 1940	–	1 May 1941
• Oberleutnant Wilfried Balfanz	1 June 1941	–	24 June 1941 †
• Hauptmann Franz von Werra	July 1941	–	25 October 1941 †
• Hauptmann Ignaz Prestele (acting)	August 1941	–	September 1941
• Major Herbert Kaminski	1 November 1941	–	24 July 1942
• Hauptmann Walter Spies	August 1942	–	October 1942
• Hauptmann Friedrich-Karl Müller	November 1942	–	14 February 1944
• Major Jürgen Harder	15 February 1944	–	January 1945
• Hauptmann Wolfgang Ernst (acting)	January 1945	–	February 1945
• Hauptmann Erich Hartmann (acting)	February 1945	–	15 February 1945
• Hauptmann Helmut Lipfert	15 February 1945	–	17 April 1945

II./JG 53

• Major Hubert Merhart von Bernegg	1 May 1939	–	19 August 1939
• Major Günther Freiherr von Maltzahn	19 August 1939	–	8 October 1940
• Hauptmann Heinz Bretnütz	9 October 1940	–	27 June 1941 †
• Hauptmann Walter Spies	June 1941	–	July 1942
• Hauptmann Gerhard Michalski	July 1942	–	23 April 1944
• Hauptmann Hans-Jürgen Westphal (acting)	19 June 1943	–	July 1943
• Major Karl-Heinz Schnell (acting)	July 1943	–	28 September 1943
• Major Julius Meimberg	24 April 1944	–	30 April 1945

III./JG 53

• Hauptmann Werner Mölders	3 October 1939	–	5 June 1940
• Hauptmann Rolf Pingel (acting)	June 1940	–	20 June 1940
• Hauptmann Harro Harder	July 1940	–	12 August 1940 †
• Hauptmann Wolf-Dietrich Wilcke	13 August 1940	–	18 May 1942
• Major Erich Gerlitz	May 1942	–	October 1942
• Hauptmann Franz Götz	October 1942	–	17 January 1945
• Hauptmann Siegfried Luckenbach	18 January 1945	–	2 May 1945
• Hauptmann Wolfgang Ernst (acting)	April 1945	–	2 May 1945

IV./JG 53

• Hauptmann Hans Morr	25 October 1944	–	29 October 1944 †
• Hauptmann Friedrich Müer	October 1944	–	2 January 1945 †
• Hauptmann Alfred Hammer	9 January 1945	–	30 April 1945

Ergänzungsgruppe

- Hauptmann Hubert Kroeck November 1940
