= Pachino =

Town in Sicily, Italy

Pachino Pachinu (Sicilian) Páchynos (Greek)
- Comune
- Comune di Pachino
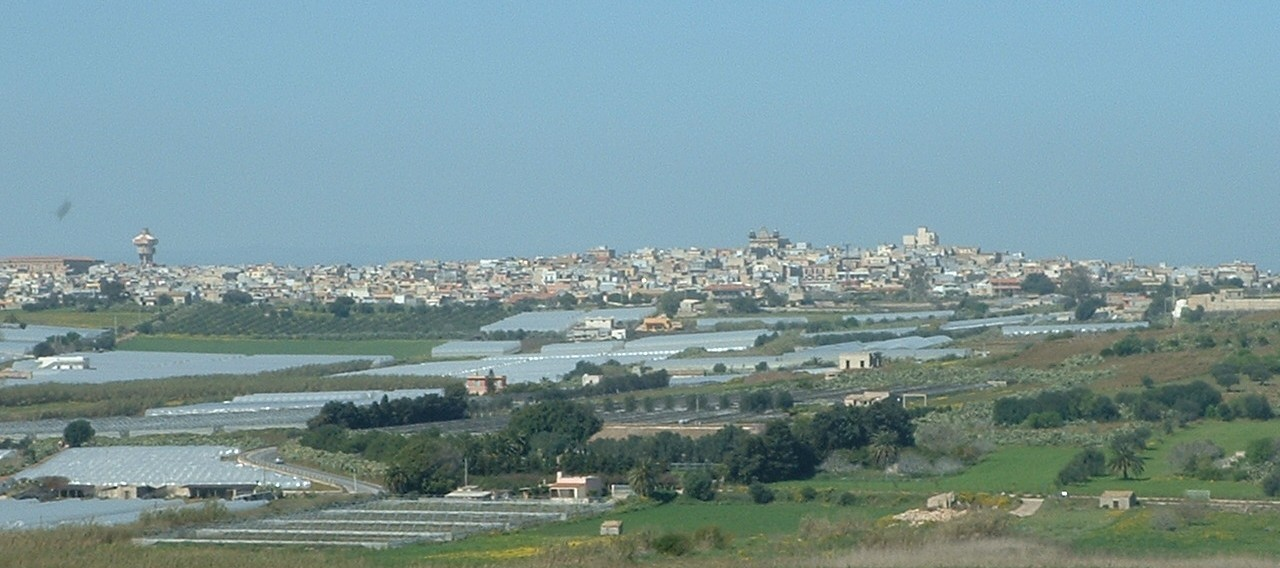
- Panorama of Pachino

- Coat of arms

- Location within Italy Location within Sicily
- Coordinates: 36°43′N 15°6′E
- Country: Italy
- Region: Sicily
- Province: Syracuse (SR)
- Frazioni: Marzamemi

Government
  - Mayor: Giuseppe Gambuzza

Area
  - Total: 50.98 km^{2} (19.68 sq mi)
- Elevation: 65 m (213 ft)

Population (31 December 2024)
  - Total: 22,086
  - Density: 433.2/km^{2} (1,122/sq mi)
- Demonym: Pachinese
- Time zone: UTC+1 (CET)
  - Summer (DST): UTC+2 (CEST)
- Postal code: 96018
- Dialing code: 0931
- Patron saint: Madonna Assunta
- Saint day: 15 August
- Website: comune.pachino.sr.it

Pachino (Italian pronunciation: [paˈkiːno]; Sicilian: Pachinu [paˈciːnʊ]) is a town and comune in the Province of Syracuse, Sicily (Italy). The name derives from the Latin word bacchus, which is the Roman god of wine, and the word vinum, which means wine in Latin; originally the town was named Bachino which eventually was changed to Pachino when, in Sicily, Italian became the official spoken and written language.

It was founded in 1760 by the nobles Starrabba, princes of Giardinelli and marquises of Rudinì, on the hill of the feud of Scibini, where a preexisting tower was built in 1494. Pachino was invaded in 1943 by the British 8th Army as a part of the allied invasion of Sicily.

== Geography ==
Pachino is situated at the south-east corner of Sicily, 51 kilometers (31 miles) south of Siracusa. The neighboring comunes are Noto (North), Portopalo di Capo Passero (South) and Ispica (East). The adjacent port of Marzamemi is located at the extreme southern tip of Sicily, and has many 18th-century buildings and fishermen's cottages.

=== Beaches ===
The beaches of the area of Pachino follow the coasts for a total of 8 kilometers. The best known are those of Lido, and Cavettone Morghella on the Ionian Coast (from Marzamemi southbound), while on the Mediterranean Coast are to Cuffara (also known as Carratois), Amber Coast, near Contrada Tanneries, Scarpitta, Chiappa and Raneddi (grains), Ulysses to the port. The sea is clear and a deep blue on the Ionian coast also in view of the seabed, instead of emerald green on the Mediterranean coast, is rich in fish, which makes the area an important commercial reference, especially for the fish market in Catania. The restoration of fish and the sea are very clean in the area of Pachino makes for a very popular tourist spot, with a flow of tourists rather than permanent and significant, even considering the interest of an area for surfers, with its current suckers, is particularly suited to the sport of windsurfing.

=== Climate ===
Located 65 meters above sea level in south-eastern province of Syracuse, straddling the Mediterranean Sea and the Ionian, Pachino has a mild climate from autumn to spring and a hot climate in summer. It is very sunny throughout the year with the probability of having a sunny day in winter being over 80%, over 90% in spring, almost 100% in summer, and over 70% in autumn. The Köppen Climate Classification subtype for this climate is "Csa" (subtropical Mediterranean climate).

Climate data for Pachino, Italy
Month	Jan	Feb	Mar	Apr	May	Jun	Jul	Aug	Sep	Oct	Nov	Dec	Year
Mean daily maximum °C (°F)	15 (59)	15 (59)	16 (61)	22 (72)	24 (75)	29 (84)	32 (90)	32 (90)	28 (82)	26 (79)	21 (70)	17 (63)	21 (70)
Mean daily minimum °C (°F)	9.5 (49.1)	9.5 (49.1)	14 (57)	16 (61)	18 (64)	22 (72)	24 (75)	26 (79)	23 (73)	20 (68)	16 (61)	12 (54)	15.5 (59.9)
Average precipitation days	5	5	5	4	2	0	0	0	2	4	6	6	39
Source: Weatherbase

== History ==
Pachino was founded in 1760 by the nobles Starraba, princes of Giardinelli and marquises of Rudini, on the hill of the feud of Scibini, where a preexisting tower was built in 1494. Pachino was occupied in 1943 by the British 8th Army during the allied invasion of Sicily.

=== Prehistory ===
The promontory of Pachino was formed during the Cretaceous more than 70 million years ago. It seems that the Promontorium Pachyni was inhabited from the earliest Prehistoric Times, although these attendances are not many testimonials: about 10,000 years ago the cave was inhabited Corruggi, in which were discovered numerous archaeological finds, are largely preserved at the Regional Archaeological Museum of Paolo Orsi in Syracuse. These scrapers, knives, spears, awls, needles and other objects of everyday use. From the caves of Corruggi and Fico, during the Neolithic Period, (between 8000 and 1500 BC), a man went to live in the caves (one of the best known of this area is the Grotte Calafarina). Later, in the Iron, copper and bronze, until the arrival of the Sicilians, the cliff dwellings were moved to the nearby area called "Cugni of Calafarina". Hence arose the village and the cemetery, a dolmen for the deceased and an underground oven for metalworking, whose remains were brought to light by Paolo Orsi, are still well preserved and quite visible today.

=== Antiquity ===
In 750 BC, the ancient territory of Pachino was inhabited by the Phoenicians, the Punics, and the Greeks. From 200 to 400 AD, the Romans dominated the area, under whom it became a center of commerce and colonization. The Romans greatly developed agriculture, and particularly the cultivation of grapes and wheat. During the Hellenistic Period several temples were built, one dedicated to Apollo Libystino. Today the ruins of a rural votive temple can still be seen in the district of Cugni; also in the same area the rails of Via Elorina are still visible on the rock. Due to the high concentration of ancient remains the district of Cugni is a sort of "archaeological park".

=== Middle Ages ===
After the Romans, the Byzantines came from 300 to 800, then the Arabs from 800 to 1090, and finally, the Normans. The Arabs gave the name to the village of Marzamemi, in which they built tunny-fishing nets, an ancient technique for catching bluefin tuna known in Spanish as Almadraba and in Italian as Tonnara. The Almadraba was operational until the 1950s. The Arabs introduced the cultivation of citrus fruits, reclaimed land, completed the aqueduct of Xibini Tower. They also built the salt flats and the wells to irrigate fields (still working), including one at the gates of Marzamemi, called in Sicilian u puzzu de quattru uocchi (the well with four eyes), which has been used for centuries, even at industrial level, by different peoples, including pirates. The city's decline began with the Normans, the Aragonese and the Angevins. In this period the fortifications of Torre Xibini and Torre Fano were built to protect the area against piratical invasions of the Turks.

=== Modern era ===
Many new feudal lands were born in Sicily from 1583 to 1714. During this period, substantial change occurred in the geography of Netino, with the foundation, in the coastal strip between the traps of Marzamemi and Cape Passero and ports of Portopalo and Marza, Pachino and Portopalo. The story begins when the current Pachino, in 1734, the Starrabba of Piazza Armerina, owners of estates and Scibini Bimmisca and, as such, with the baronetcy in addition to the principles of Giardinelli, decided to reside in the territory to better care their interests and also to acquire the title of Count. To this end, the brothers Gaetano and Vincent Starrabba asked, in 1758, Charles III of Bourbon, and later, in 1760, Ferdinand I of the Two Sicilies permission to found a city (licentia populandi), a decree was issued Naples on 21 July 1760 and was made enforceable on 1 December 1760. Prince Ferdinand I wanted to enact the conditions of the Royal Decree. So he invited the neighbors to populate the new Maltese country and more than thirty families accepted the invitation. The first families were Agius, Azzoppard, Arafam, Bughagiar, Bartolo, Caldies, Bonelli, Cammisuli, Borgh, Cassar Scalia, Boager, Fenech, Ferruggia, Grech, Mizzi, Meilach, Micalef, Mallia, Ongres, Saliba, a Sultan, and Xueref other. The city was one of the first areas to see fighting during the combined British and American mission occupy Sicily in the operation codenamed Operation Husky during World War II. When British and American forces landed in Sicily the civilian population, tired with the war and the Fascist regime, often welcomed them as liberators and not as conquerors. Pachino was captured by an amphibious force from the British Eighth Army under General Montgomery on the 10 July 1943, when British and Canadian troops made a sea-born landing to the east and south of the city and then pushed inland, facing little resistance from the Italian coastal troops. Montgomery himself came ashore on 11 July, he was excited to hear about the success of the forces under his command, and upon arriving in the Pachino area was informed that not only had the port city of Syracuse been successfully captured by the British 13th corps, but also that its port had been seized "intact and undamaged".

== Monuments ==
=== Landmarks ===
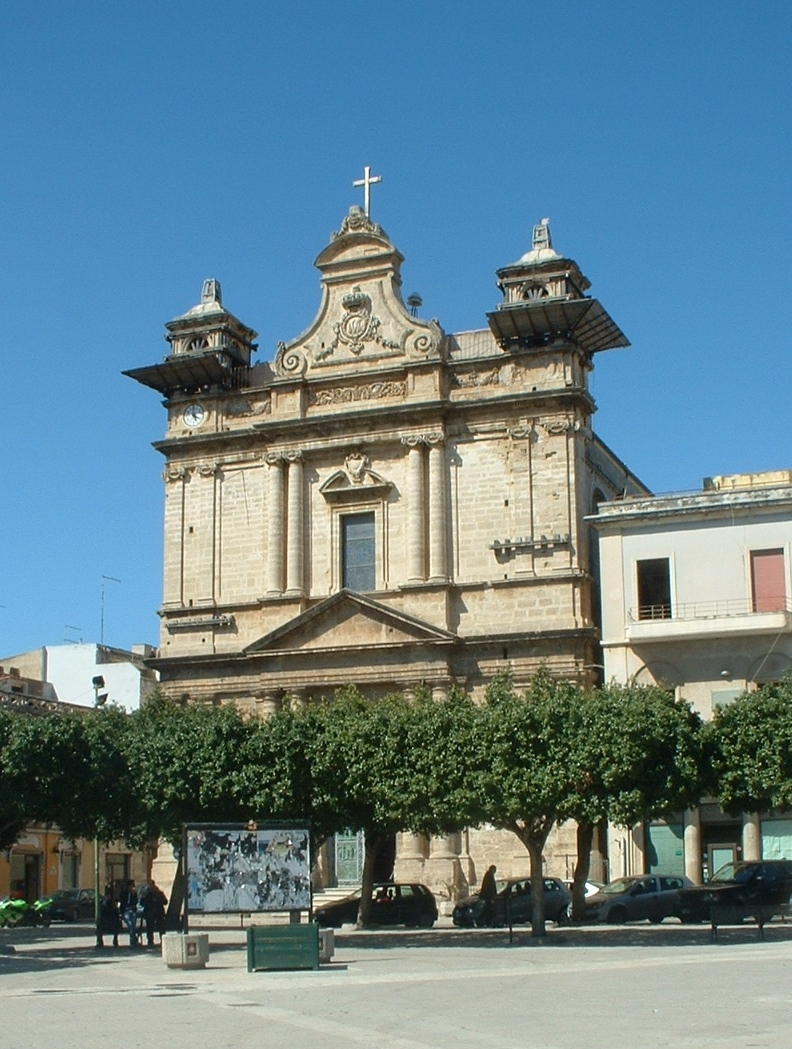
Chiesa Madre SS Crocifisso

- Chiesa Madre SS. Crocifisso: built in 1790 by Marchese Vincenzo Starrabba for the Christian Community, it has a simple structure comprising a single aisle with a chapel on the right of the apse, there are the remains of Gaetano and Vincent Starrabba. Renovated in 2010.
- Torre Scibini: built in 1439 of Count Antonio de Xurtino to deal with the raids of Saracen pirates
- Tonnara di Marzamemi: dates from the time of the domination of the Arabs in Sicily in 1630, was sold by the owner to the Prince of Villadorata
- Palazzo e Chiesa della Tonnara: built in 1752
- Palazzo Tasca: construction 19th century, which houses an impressive backyard paved with flagstones by limestone

=== Archeological sites ===
- Grotta Corruggi (Paleolithic)
- Ditches to collect rainwater (Paleolithic)
- Cave Fico (Mesolithic)
- Grotta Calafarina (Neolithic)
- Necropolis (oven graves), and oven dolmens (Neolithic)
- Basements of huts (Neolithic)
- Greek Temple (the base for columns) (3rd century)
- Roman Village (3rd or 4th century)

== Notable people ==
- Vitaliano Brancati (1907–1954), writer
- Margareth Madè (born 1982), actress and model; grew up in Pachino

== Culture ==
=== Cinema ===
The town of Pachino and its surroundings have been repeatedly chosen as the location of movie sets, including:

- Kaos (1984) by the Taviani brothers
- South (1993) by Gabriele Salvatores
- The Star Maker (1995) by Giuseppe Tornatore
- Overseas (1999) Nello Correale
- Raging Heart (2003) Gianluca Sodaro
- The Iguana (2004) by Catherine McGilvray
- Salvatore - This Is Life (2006) by Gian Paolo Cugno
- Fireworks (Stranizza D'Amuri) - (2023) by Giuseppe Fiorello

Pachino was also set for some episodes of the drama Inspector Montalbano.

Since 2000, the town hosts the Festival of Cinema of the Frontier, which takes place in the main square of Marzamemi, with screenings of films and short films from different parts of the world.

=== Frazione ===
Marzamemi is the fishing village of Pachino. Its name derives from the Arabic al-Marsa-hamem, which means "bay of turtledoves," last frontier of the island, the tip of Sicily. In the beginning was an Arab village. The center of Marzamemi, with its architecture (including the salt, the trap and the first "Arab casuzze" date from this first settlement. Marzamemi The current form and took an official capacity in 1752, when the Prince of Villadorata made work at the building, the lodge, the new trap and the Catholic Church.

== Economy ==
Agriculture is Pachino's primary economic sector. In the 19th century cotton farming started gaining ground, but by the late 19th century vine cultivation had grown and strengthen. In the Pachino area the export of musts and blending wines to northern Italy and France markets has gained importance throughout the years. However, most of Pachino's economy is still tied to the production of fruit and vegetables, which stand in the cherry tomatoes of Pachino (IGP) and "ribbed", but the farmers' hopes are directed to the recovery of viticulture and, above all, the production of quality wines. The town is part of the City of Wine.

The "Porto Grande," a maritime infrastructure, was built (c. 1850) in Fossa (a Marzamemi hamlet) for the marketing of wine. Wine-ducts linked the Rubino Winery directly with tankers. The tankers filled with wine would depart to the port of Marseille. After the construction of Pachino rail station (c. 1935) until the late 1960s wine and other goods were transported by rail.

In the 1970s Pachino's viticulture underwent through a serious crisis, which led to the abandonment and weeding of many vineyards, which were replaced by greenhouses of fruit and vegetables that now constitute Pachino's main production. This market generates a very high turnover and employs almost 4000 people just in the Pachino area. Today, even the fruit and vegetable market is going through a difficult period, due to market disruptions and infrastructure problems. Pachino is experiencing a revival of the vineyards, however, now dedicated to quality productions such as Nero d'Avola and other DOC wines.

The production of red tuna mullet is also notorious, which is manufactured by local Marzamemi's artisans, according to an old Arab tradition. The crafted conservation of fruit and vegetables and locally caught fish is also well developed which holds the secrets of an ancient culinary tradition, and is now much sought after.
