= FMF =

FMF may refer to:

== Arts ==
- "Fantastic Mr Fox", a novel by Roald Dahl
  - "Fantastic Mr. Fox" (film)
  - "Fantastic Mr. Fox" (opera)
- Fender Music Foundation, an American children's charity
- Firefly Music Festival, in Dover, Delaware, United States
- Florida Music Festival, in Orlando, Florida, United States

== Sport ==
- Federação Mineira de Futebol, a Brazilian sports federation
- Malagasy Football Federation (French: Fédération Malagasy de Football)
- Malian Football Federation (French: Fédération Malienne de Football)
- Mexican Football Federation (Spanish: Federación Mexicana de Fútbol Asociación)
- Moldovan Football Federation (Romanian: Federația Moldovenească de Fotbal)
- Mozambican Football Federation (Portuguese: Federação Moçambicana de Futebol)

== Other uses ==
- Familial Mediterranean fever
- Fees Must Fall, a South African student protest
- Feminist Majority Foundation, an American rights organization
- Fleet Marine Force, of the United States Navy and United States Marine Corps
- Find My Friends, iOS software
- First Millennial Foundation, now the Living Universe Foundation, a pro-space colonisation group
- Front mid-engine, front-wheel-drive layout, a vehicle drivetrain layout
- Funkmaster Flex (born 1967), American hip hop DJ
- United States Foreign Military Financing, a program of the United States federal government
