= Guitar Center =

American musical instrument retailer

Guitar Center, Inc.
- Formerly: The Organ Center (1959–1964); The Vox Center
- Type: Private
- Traded as: Nasdaq: GTRC
- Industry: Musical instruments
- Founded: 1959; 67 years ago (as The Organ Center); Hollywood, Los Angeles, California, U.S.
- Founder: Wayne Mitchell
- Headquarters: Westlake Village, California, U.S.
- Key people: Gabriel Dalporto (CEO)
- Products: Musical instruments, recording equipment and accessories
- Revenue: ▲$2.14 billion
- Owner: Ares Management
- Number of employees: 10,000
- Website: guitarcenter.com

Guitar Center, Inc. is an American musical instrument retailer chain headquartered in Westlake Village, California. It operates 304 locations and is the largest company of its kind in the United States.

The company oversees several subsidiaries, including Musician's Friend, AVDG, Music & Arts, Woodwind & Brasswind, and Giardinelli.

== History ==
Guitar Center was founded in Hollywood in 1959 by Wayne Mitchell as The Organ Center, a retailer of electronic organs for home and church use. In 1964, after a supplier required him to carry Vox guitar amplifiers, to continue receiving organs, Mitchell added the amplifiers to his inventory and renamed the store The Vox Center, leveraging the Beatles' association with the Vox brand. In the late 1960s, as other brands like Marshall gained popularity, Mitchell renamed the store Guitar Center.

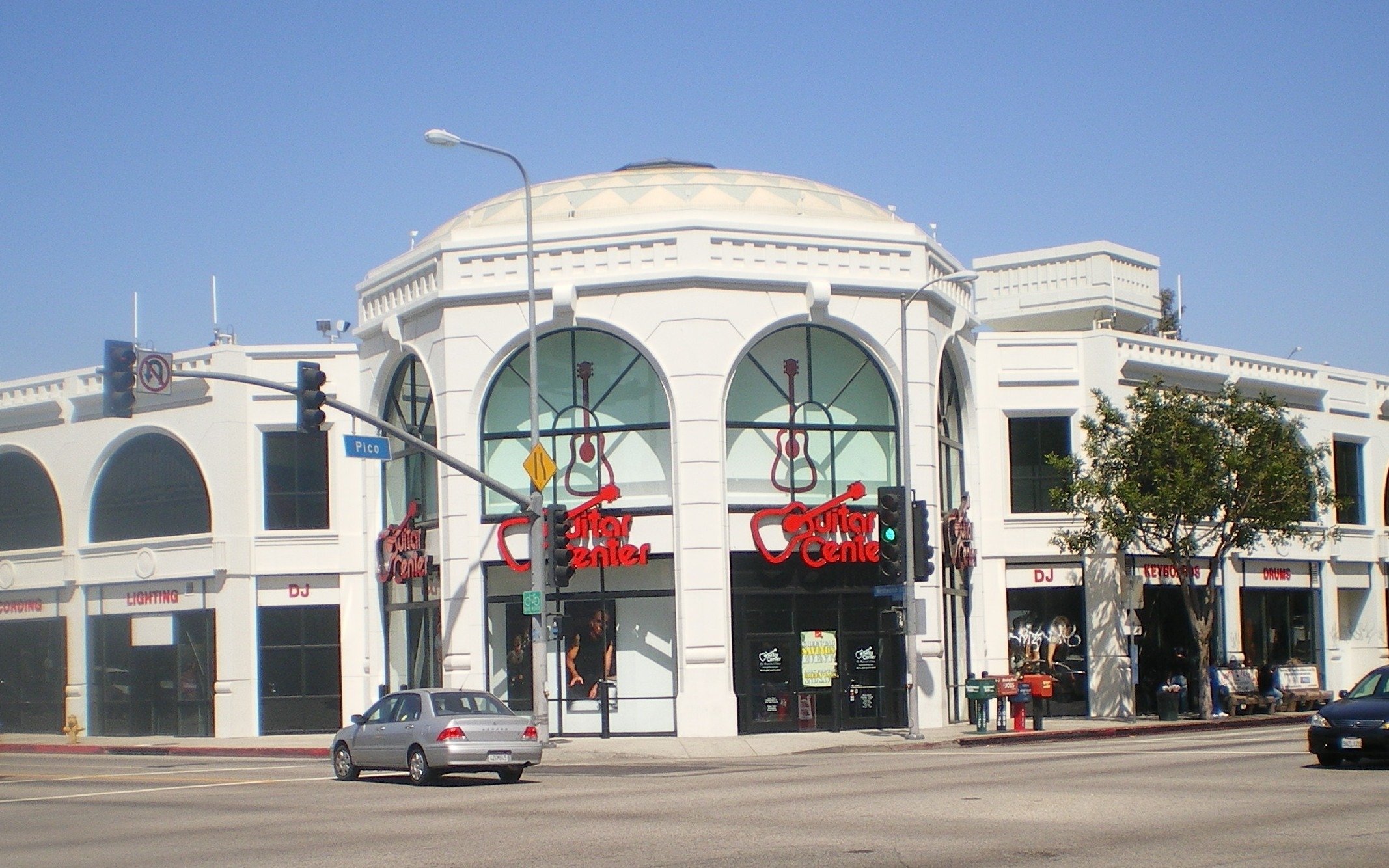
Guitar Center outlet at West L.A., Pico & Westwood

By 1972, Guitar Center had expanded to eight locations, including stores in San Francisco, San Diego and suburbs of Los Angeles. In the late 1970s, Ray Scherr, the General Manager of the San Francisco store, purchased the company from Wayne Mitchell.

The 1980s saw a resurgence in "guitar rock," led by bands such as Van Halen and an influx of Japanese-produced instruments. This period brought significant growth in guitar sales, prompting Guitar Center to expand nationwide, eventually becoming the largest musical instrument retailer in the United States.

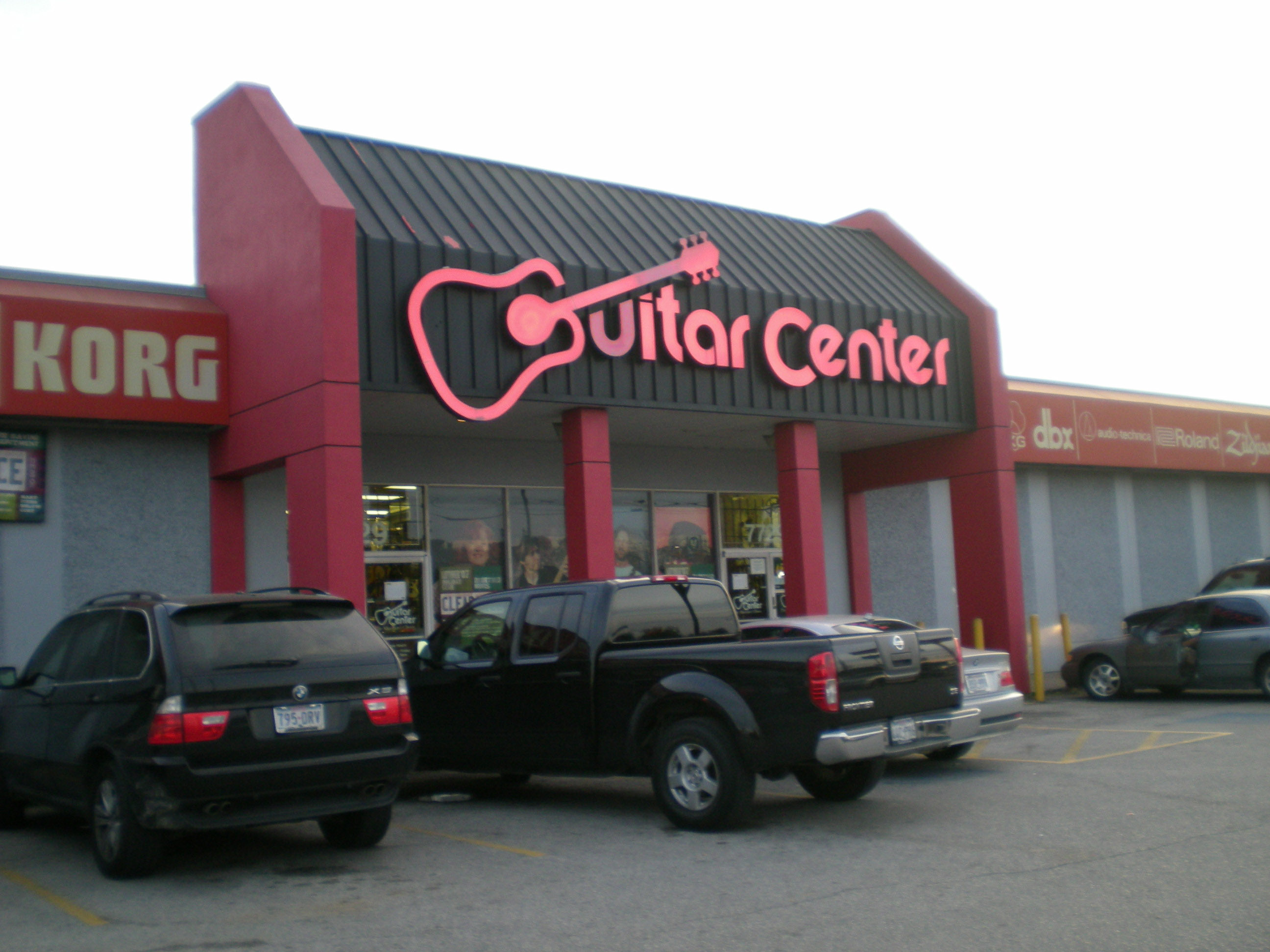
A Guitar Center retail store in Houston, Texas

Scherr sold the company in 1996. The following year, with 30 stores on the West Coast and in Michigan, Ohio, and Florida, Guitar Center made an initial public offering of stock and opened more new locations.

In 2000, Guitar Center acquired mail order and e-commerce retailer Musician's Friend for $50 million, and claimed the merged company was the world's largest seller of musical instruments. Musician's Friend became a wholly owned subsidiary, with its headquarters remaining in Medford, Oregon.

In 2005, Guitar Center Inc. acquired Music & Arts, the largest band and orchestra dealer in the United States, and merged it with their American Music Group chain of band and orchestral stores. The company was renamed Music & Arts. The same year, Guitar Center, Inc., started The Fender Music Foundation, a nonprofit organization that supported music education.

In 2006, Guitar Center acquired four stores in Texas from the South Texas and Central/South American company, Hermes. In the same year, Activision partnered with Guitar Center, and all purchases made during game play of Guitar Hero, beginning with the second installment, were made in a virtual Guitar Center store.

In February 2007, the Musician's Friend division acquired assets of the Indiana-based company Dennis Bamber, Inc., which included band and orchestra retailer Woodwind & Brasswind, plus Music 123 and Lyons Music.

In June 2007, Guitar Center agreed to a $1.9 billion buyout from Bain Capital, totaling $2.1 billion including debt. The deal was led by Goldman Sachs and amounted to a per-share price of $63, or a 26% premium on the June 26 closing price. The deal was approved by shareholders on September 18, 2007, and closed October 9, 2007.

In mid-2009, Guitar Center opened its first rehearsal and lessons studio facility in Woodland Hills, California, consisting of eight studios with backline, ranging in size from 350–550 square feet (33–51 m^{2}).

In 2011, Musician's Friend's headquarters operations were moved to Guitar Center's facilities in Westlake Village, California. In the same year, Guitar Center began offering equipment rentals in one of their San Diego stores. Rental departments were extended to ten other locations, with plans to offer rentals across the country.

In May 2013, Standard & Poor's cut its debt rating on Bain Capital-owned Guitar Center Holdings Inc. to "junk bond" status, citing struggles with "weak operating trends." The corporate credit rating on the company dropped from B to 'CCC+'.

In April 2014, Ares Management took a controlling stake in Guitar Center. Bain Capital, Guitar Center's former owner, retained partial ownership of the company, along with representation on the board. According to Mike Pratt, the retailer's previous chief executive, the deal would reduce Guitar Center's total debt and provide it with the resources to expand and invest in its business.

In August 2014, Guitar Center opened a new 28,000-square-foot flagship location in Times Square in New York City. The opening included a concert featuring The Roots. The Guitar Center Times Square location became the permanent home of Eric Clapton's Blackie Fender Stratocaster, which had been purchased at a Christie's Crossroads Centre auction in 2004 for $959,000.

In April, 2017, Moody's Investors Service revised the outlook on Guitar Center's B2 rating to negative. In the face of flat sales in the musical instrument industry as a whole, Guitar Center became overwhelmed by its $1 billion debt.

Guitar Center filed for bankruptcy in 2020 and the Times Square location was closed. On November 13, 2020, during the COVID-19 pandemic, Guitar Center announced that it planned to file for Chapter 11 bankruptcy protection after negotiating a debt-cutting deal with key investors and lenders. Guitar Center said it had received up to $165 million in new equity, and lenders agreed to reduce its debt by around $800 million. The company emerged from Chapter 11 bankruptcy on December 23, 2020, after a reorganization deal added additional equity and debt capital.

== Guitar Center Legends Collection ==
In 2004, the Guitar Center began a "Legends Collection" with guitars made famous by Eric Clapton, Stevie Ray Vaughan, and U2's the Edge. Guitar Center purchased Clapton’s “Blackie” Fender Stratocaster for $959,500, his vintage Gibson “ES-335” for $847,500, and Vaughan’s “Lenny” Stratocaster for $623,500, a total of over $2.4 million, in the Clapton Crossroads Centre charity auction at Christie's, New York. The Edge’s cream white Gibson Les Paul Custom was purchased for $240,000 at the Music Rising Charity Auction in 2007. The collection has been exhibited in a tour of musical events and Guitar Center locations, such as the one held at Madison Square Garden as part of Clapton’s Crossroads Guitar Festival in April 2013. In August 2014, Clapton’s Blackie and ES-335 were moved to a new permanent location in Times Square.

Clapton's cherry red Gibson 335 was used to record Cream’s versions of "Badge" and "Crossroads (from their final live performance in November 1968), and other historical performances over 40 years. Steve Ray Vaughan’s "Lenny" was used to record his classic love songs, including "Lenny" and "Riviera Paradise". The Edge's cream-colored 1975 Les Paul Custom, faded from its original white, had been used for U2's stage and studio performances. All the proceeds from the sale of these guitars went to Clapton’s Crossroads Center charity.

In 2005, the Edge, producer Bob Ezrin, Gibson, and the Guitar Center Music Foundation (now known as the Fender Music Foundation) established Music Rising, a charity to benefit musicians whose lives had been disrupted by Hurricane Katrina. In 2007 The Edge donated his guitar to be auctioned for the charity and It was sold for $240,000 to Guitar Center ($288,000 including Buyer's Premium).

== Guitar Center's Drum-Off ==
From 1988 through 2016, Guitar Center conducted an annual search for the next "great undiscovered drummer". Developed to spotlight the drumming community, the Drum-Off was the music retailer’s longest running artist-discovery program.

The process of Guitar Center’s Drum-Off began with three rounds of preliminary competitions at each of Guitar Center's 250+ locations nationwide, with each contestant allowed five minutes of set up time and three minutes to perform. One winner from each store final competition advanced to one of 30 quarterfinal competitions, and one winner from each quarterfinal competition advanced to one of five semifinal competitions, during which contestants were allowed five minutes to perform. The winners from each of these five semifinal competitions qualified to compete in front of a live audience and a panel of celebrity judges at Guitar Center's Drum-Off finals in Los Angeles, California.

In the finals, each contestant was required to perform on a 5-piece acoustic drum kit complete with hardware, cymbals, cowbell, throne and the option to incorporate a Roland SPD-30 Octapad (the SPD-30 was not included in 2016). Contestants were evaluated by a panel of independent and credible judges on the following criteria: skills & technique, groove, originality, stage presence, and overall performance.

Guitar Center discontinued their sponsorship of the annual contest in 2017.

== Hollywood's RockWalk ==
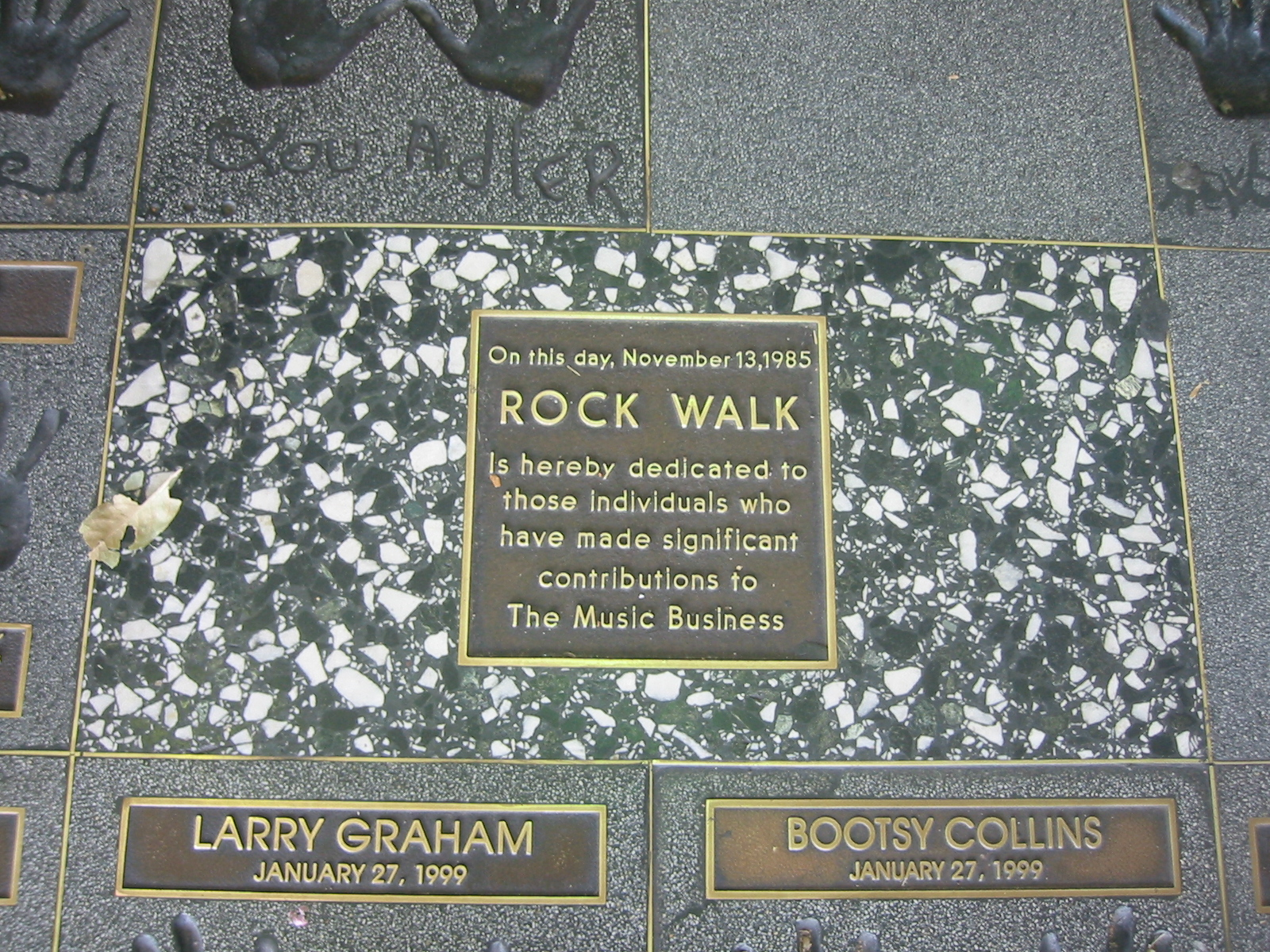
RockWalk

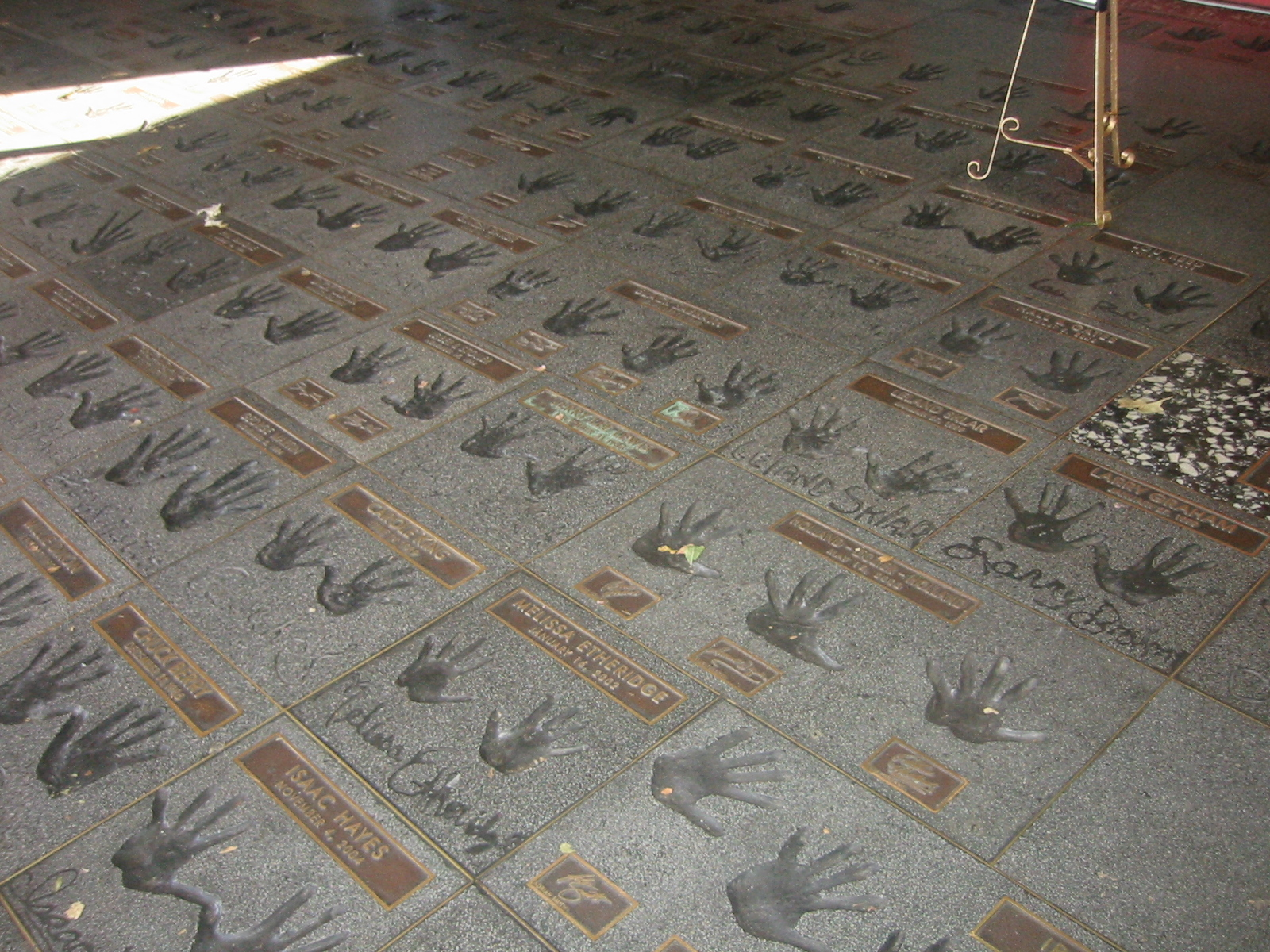
RockWalk detail

The Sunset Boulevard location in Los Angeles hosts Hollywood's RockWalk, a hall of fame, honoring musical artists. Founded in 1985, artists are invited to place their handprints into cement blocks that are put on display at the Guitar Center. The inaugural inductees were music gear pioneers Jim Marshall, Robert Moog, Les Paul, and musicians Eddie Van Halen and Stevie Wonder. Currently, over 150 more honorees are enshrined.

== Media ==
=== Guitar Center Sessions ===
Debuting in 2010, each episode of Guitar Center Sessions showcases exclusive live performances by noteworthy artists captured in hi-definition at Guitar Center's iconic Hollywood, California location. Past guests include Linkin Park, Saint Motel, Wiz Khalifa, Billy Idol, The 1975, Sum 41, Weezer, Smashing Pumpkins, Peter Gabriel, Alanis Morissette, 311, Megadeth, Snoop Dogg, Soundgarden, Seether, The Cult, Cake, Jakob Dylan, Tame Impala, Rodrigo y Gabriela, Bush, Ben Folds Five, Korn, Joan Jett, Cheap Trick, Skylar Grey, Peter Frampton, Frank Turner, J Balvin, Coheed and Cambria, Debbie Harry, Kraftwerk and Jane's Addiction. Guitar Center Sessions is hosted by Nic Harcourt, and was created, developed and produced by Guitar Center exclusively on DirecTV. Guitar Center Sessions has won several awards, including a Lumiere Award from the International 3D Society for the episodes featuring Jane's Addiction and Peter Gabriel. To celebrate Guitar Center's 50th anniversary, Linkin Park performed on October 24, 2014, with the performance first airing via DirecTV on December 5, 2014.

=== At: Guitar Center web series ===
The At: Guitar Center web series (formerly At: Guitar Center podcast) features interviews and intimate performances with some of the biggest names in music. Some past guests have included Travis Barker, Sevendust, T-Pain, Joe Bonamassa, The Crystal Method, Buddy Guy, Elmer Bernstein, Daughtry, Jimmy Cliff, Meiko, Lee Jong-suk, Rza, Steve Vai, Joe Satriani, Brandi Carlile, and Minus the Bear. The podcast is hosted by Nic Harcourt and is available on the iTunes, Zune and BlackBerry networks and on the Guitar Center website.

=== Connections Made by Guitar Center ===
Connections Made by Guitar Center, a collaboration between 88.5 KCSN Los Angeles and Guitar Center, was a weekly one-hour radio program hosted by radio host Nic Harcourt featuring new music from both signed and unsigned artists from across the globe and musical spectrum.

=== Albums recorded at Guitar Center ===
- No Stairway by Glassine
- Live at Guitar Center by Noah Wall
- Heavy Metal by Cameron Winter
- One Week by First of October

== See also ==
- Music & Arts Center
- Woodwind & Brasswind
