= Woodwind & Brasswind =

American musical instrument retailer

Woodwind & Brasswind was the largest online retailer of band and orchestra instruments in the United States. Formerly based in South Bend, Indiana, the company served customers exclusively through their website and call center before being converted to Music & Arts Center in 2024.

== History ==
Originally founded in 1978 as The Woodwind, the store was established in a converted barbershop in South Bend, Indiana, and marketed its products via a hand-typed flyer that was mailed to 350 music teachers in the Midwest.

In the 1980s, The Woodwind expanded its product offering to brass instruments and became The Woodwind & The Brasswind. Outgrowing the original location, the company moved into a larger location with a retail store, a warehouse, and a dedicated call center to support its mail-order business. In the 1990s, the number of call center agents increased from 12 to 75, and the company launched its first website.

On April 1, 1999, the company relocated to 4004 Technology Drive in South Bend and simplified its name to The Woodwind & Brasswind. The company's retail store at the new location was the largest musical instrument store in the region.

In 2002, Woodwind & Brasswind acquired Music123.com, a New Jersey–based online retailer of musical instruments and equipment, and hired Music123.com founders Stephan and Richard Zapf. In 2004, Woodwind & Brasswind terminated the Zapf brothers, beginning a two-year legal dispute concerning the terms of the acquisition and the brothers' employment. The resulting verdict was unfavorable to Woodwind & Brasswind, causing the company to default on various loans and payable accounts. On November 21, 2006, Woodwind & Brasswind filed for bankruptcy protection.

On November 28, 2006, Guitar Center offered $37.1 million for the purchase of Woodwind & Brasswind. A few weeks later on December 6, Steinway Musical Instruments offered $40.1M for acquisition, but subsequently announced on its Investor Relations page on January 16, 2007, its intention to terminate its asset purchase agreement with Dennis Bamber Inc. d/b/a/ Woodwind and Brasswind. Guitar Center purchased the assets of Dennis Bamber, Inc., D/B/A The Woodwind & The Brasswind in an agreement dated January 30, 2007.

In 2011, the company closed its South Bend retail store and warehouse, and announced its intention to transfer its call center employees to Indianapolis by the end of the year.

On November 13, 2020, during the COVID-19 pandemic, Guitar Center announced that it planned to file for Chapter 11 bankruptcy protection after negotiating a debt-cutting deal with key investors and lenders. Guitar Center said it had received up to $165 million in new equity, and lenders agreed to reduce its debt by around $800 million. Guitar Center filed for bankruptcy on November 21, 2020. The company emerged from Chapter 11 bankruptcy on December 23, 2020, after a reorganization deal added additional equity and debt capital.

In 2024, Woodwind & Brasswind was rebranded to the brand that Guitar Center had already acquired in 2005, Music & Arts.

== Sponsor of awards ==
- Arion Award, a national award for outstanding achievement in scholastic standing, contributions to one's musical organization, and demonstration of personal and professional performing ability and musicianship.
