= List of shipwrecks in December 1869 =

The list of shipwrecks in December 1869 includes ships sunk, foundered, grounded, or otherwise lost during December 1869.

== 1 December ==
List of shipwrecks: 1 December 1869
Ship	State	Description
Delphin	France	The ship was driven ashore at Dunkirk, Nord. She was on a voyage from Pärnu, Russia to Dunkirk.
Dwina	United Kingdom	The ship was wrecked on the Woolpack Sand.
Emile	Sweden	The brig ran aground on the Lemon and Ower Sand, in the North Sea. She was on a voyage from Skellefteå to Whitehaven, Cumberland, United Kingdom. She was refloated and taken into Ostend, West Flanders, Belgium in a leaky condition.
Helsingør	Denmark	The barque ran aground on the Lemon and Ower Sand and was abandoned by her fourteen crew, who were rescued by the Caister Lifeboat Birmingham ( Royal National Lifeboat Institution). Helsingør was on a voyage from Söderhamn, Sweden to London, United Kingdom. She floated off and came ashore at Gorleston, Suffolk, United Kingdom and was wrecked. Her crew were rescued.
Isabella	(United Kingdom of Great Britain and Ireland) Tasmania	The ship was driven ashore on Cape Barren Island. She was on a voyage from Bird Island to Launceston. She later floated off and sank.
Jeune Joseph	(France) Algeria	The ship sank at "Stona".
Joseph Holmes	United Kingdom	The ship sprang a leak and was abandoned 12 nautical miles (22 km) south west of the South Stack Lighthouse, Anglesey. Her crew were rescued by the tug Iron King (United Kingdom). Joseph Holmes was on a voyage from New York to the Clyde.
Linton	United Kingdom	The ship was driven ashore and wrecked at Boulogne, Pas-de-Calais, France. She was on a voyage from Liverpool, Lancashire to Boulogne.
Osbourne House	United Kingdom	The ship was driven ashore at Sheringham, Norfolk. Her crew were rescued.
Ouse	United Kingdom	The schooner ran aground on the Barnard Sand, in the North Sea off the coast of Suffolk. She was on a voyage from Goole, Yorkshire to London. She was refloated and taken into Harwich, Essex in a severely leaky condition.
Pet	United Kingdom	The brig collided with the steamship Pelham (United Kingdom) and sank off the coast of Suffolk. Her crew were rescued by Pelham. Pet was on a voyage from South Shields, County Durham to Boulogne, Pas-de-Calais, France.
Pioneer	United Kingdom	The steam lighter suffered a boiler explosion and sank in the Firth of Clyde at Dunoon, Argyllshire with the loss of all five crew. She was on a voyage from Bowling, Dunbartonshire to Brodick, Isle of Arran.
Reine des Flots	France	The ship foundered in the Dogger Bank. Her crew were rescued. She was on a voyage from Bilbao, Spain to Newcastle upon Tyne, Northumberland, United Kingdom.
Ronaldes	Flag unknown	The brig was driven ashore on Terschelling, Friesland. She was on a voyage from Kronstadt, Russia to Hull, Yorkshire, United Kingdom.
Sultana	United Kingdom	The ship was sighted in the South West Pass whilst on a voyage from New Orleans, Louisiana, United States to Liverpool. No further trace, presumed foundered with the loss of all hands.

== 2 December ==
List of shipwrecks: 2 December 1869
Ship	State	Description
Alma	Norway	The ship ran aground at Allinge, Denmark. Her crew were rescued. She was on a voyage from Riga, Russia to Cork, United Kingdom.
Ancestor	United Kingdom	The ship capsized in the River Wear. She was righted on 5 December.
Celeritas	Sweden	The barque ran aground on the Goodwin Sands, Kent, United Kingdom. She was on a voyage from Stockholm to Rio de Janeiro, Brazil. She was revloated and taken into Ramsgate, Kent in a leaky condition.
Frances Mary Phillips	United Kingdom	The sloop was driven ashore at Redcar, Yorkshire. Her three crew were rescued by the Redcar Lifeboat Burton on Trent ( Royal National Lifeboat Institution). Frances Mary Phillips was on a voyage from Inverkeithing, Fife to London.
Freya	United Kingdom	The ship was abandoned off Cette, Hérault, France. Her crew were rescued by the Cette Lifeboat. She was on a voyage from London to Cette.
Integrity	United Kingdom	The ship departed from the Humber for London. No further trace, presumed foundered with the loss of all hands.
Marsden	United Kingdom	The ship departed from Sunderland, County Durham for London. No further trace, presumed foundered with the loss of all hands.
Milka Dobrota	Austria-Hungary	The ship capsized and sank off the Salvore Lighthouse with the loss of all but one of her crew. She was on a voyage from Trieste to Queenstown, County Cork.
Santona	United Kingdom	The ship was damaged by fire at Valparaíso, Chile.
Solid	Sweden	The ship was driven ashore at Wyk auf Föhr, Prussia.
Star of Scotia	United Kingdom	The ship ran aground on the Kentish Knock. She was refloated and towed into Margate, Kent in a capsized condition.
Sydney	United Kingdom	The schooner was discovered derelict off Great Orme Head, Caernarfonshire. She was taken in tow by the tug Talbot (United Kingdom) and beached in the River Mersey.
Woodham	United Kingdom	The ship was driven ashore at Neufahrwasser, Prussia.

== 3 December ==
List of shipwrecks: 3 December 1869
Ship	State	Description
Caribou	United Kingdom	The ship was destroyed by fire in the South Atlantic. Her crew were rescued by Palawan (United Kingdom). Caribou was on a voyage from the Clyde to Bombay, India.
Celadine	United Kingdom	The ship was driven ashore and wrecked at Robert's Head, County Cork. Her crew were rescued. She was on a voyage from Queenstown, County Cork to the Bristol Channel.
Eleanor	United Kingdom	The brig foundered in the North Sea. Her crew were rescued by Mabel (United Kingdom).
Reine et Marie	France	The ship was boarded by twenty pirates and run ashore on Zakynthos, Greece. She was plundered by the local inhabitants and her crew were forced to abandon her; they were rescued by the steamship Electra. (United Kingdom). Reine et Marie was on a voyage from Cardiff, Glamorgan, United Kingdom to Port Said, Egypt.
Reliance	United Kingdom	The fishing smack was driven ashore and wrecked at Lowestoft, Suffolk.
Siberia	United Kingdom	The steamship was driven ashore at Egremont, Lancashire. She was refloated.
Victoria	United Kingdom	The ship was driven ashore between Fatouville and Berville-sur-Mer, Eure, France. Her crew were rescued by the tug Vulcain (France). Victoria was on a voyage from Sunderland, County Durham to Rouen, Seine-Inférieure, France.

== 4 December ==
List of shipwrecks: 4 December 1869
Ship	State	Description
Anne	United Kingdom	The schooner foundered off Scarborough, Yorkshire. Her crew were rescued by a brig.
Bradford	United Kingdom	The brig sprang a leak and foundered in Bridlington Bay. Her crew were rescued. She was on a voyage from Seaham, County Durham to Rochester, Kent.
Brenton	United Kingdom	The schooner ran aground on the Skullmartin Rock, off Ballywalter, County Down and was abandoned. Her five crew were rescued by the Ballywalter Lifeboat Admiral Meynell ( Royal National Lifeboat Institution). Brenton was on a voyage from Ardrossan, Ayrshire to Newport, Monmouthshire. She was subsequently taken into Ballywalter.
Cafarina	Denmark	The sloop was driven ashore and wrecked at Sunderland, County Durham. Her four crew were rescued by rocket apparatus. She was on a voyage from Randers to the River Tyne.
Constance	Norway	The schooner was driven ashore at Hartlepool, County Durham. She was on a voyage from Uddevalla, Sweden to Hartlepool. She was refloated.
Cyprus	United Kingdom	The ship was wrecked on Key Confites. Her crew survived. She was on a voyage from Liverpool, Lancashire to Matanzas, Cuba.
Fairlie Ann Jones	United Kingdom	The schooner ran aground off "Voel Nant".
Glyndwr	United Kingdom	The schooner was run ashore and severely damaged at Pwllheli, Caernarfonshire. Her crew survived. She was on a voyage from Liverpool, Lancashire to Barmouth, Merionethshire.
Hopeful, or Hopewell	United Kingdom	The smack sank off Rhyl, Denbighshire. Her crew were rescued. She was on a voyage from Llandulas, Denbighshire to Birkenhead, Cheshire.
Jane Innes	United Kingdom	The brigantine was abandoned in the English Channel 14 nautical miles (26 km) south south west of Dungeness, Kent. Her crew survived. She was on a voyage from Newcastle upon Tyne, Northumberland to Cherbourg, Seine-Inférieure, France. Jane Innes was taken into Havre de Grâce, Seine-Inférieure, France on 6 December.
Lady Warncliffe	United Kingdom	The ship was driven ashore at Winterton-on-Sea, Norfolk. Her crew were rescued. She was on a voyage from Hamburg to Cardiff, Glamorgan.
Madryn	United Kingdom	The schooner was holed by an anchor at Lymington, Hampshire. She was on a voyage from London to Bristol, Gloucestershire. She was taken into Lymington or Yarmouth, Isle of Wight for repairs.
Minerva	United Kingdom	The brig sprang a leak and was beached at Sewerby, Yorkshire. Her crew survived. She was on a voyage from Seaham, County Durham to Southampton, Hampshire. She was refloated and taken into Bridlington, Yorkshire.
Reliance	United Kingdom	The smack was driven ashore at Lowestoft, Suffolk. Her crew were rescued.
Rossini	United Kingdom	The brig was wrecked near Pernambuco, Brazil. She was on a voyage from Bahia to Pernambuco.
Schiedam	Netherlands	The brig sprang a leak and foundered in the North Sea off the coast of Yorkshire, United Kingdom with the loss of her captain. Five survivors were rescued by the Scarorough Lifeboat. She was on a voyage from Seaham to Southampton, Hampshire, United Kingdom.
Speculation	United Kingdom	The schooner was run ashore and wrecked at Porthor, Caernarfonshire. She was on a voyage from Aberdovey, Merionethshire to Dublin.
Theone	Netherlands	The ship was destroyed by fire at Rotterdam, South Holland.
Thetis	United Kingdom	The ship was driven ashore at Filey, Yorkshire.
William	United Kingdom	The schooner was driven ashore and wrecked at Seaham. Her crew were rescued.

== 5 December ==
List of shipwrecks: 5 December 1869
Ship	State	Description
Commerce	United Kingdom	The schooner ran aground at Wexford.
General Slade	(United Kingdom of Great Britain and Ireland) Guernsey	The ship sailed from South Shields, County Durham for Brest, Finistère. No further trace, presumed foundered with the loss of all hands.
Germania	Sweden	The steamship was abandoned in the North Sea in a sinking condition. She was on a voyage from Stockholm to an English port.
Linda, Miranda, Renata, and an Unnamed barque	United Kingdom; Norway	The steamship Miranda collided with the barques Linda, Renata and another at Hull, Yorkshire. All four vessels were severely damaged.
Lloreta	Spain	The schooner was abandoned in the Bristol Channel off Porthcawl, Glamorgan, United Kingdom. All on board were rescued by Good Deliverance ( Royal National Lifeboat Institution). LLoreta was on a voyage from Liverpool, Lancashire, United Kingdom to Havana, Cuba.
Myrtle	United Kingdom	The ship sprang a leak in the English Channel off the coast of Sussex and was abandoned by her crew. They were rescued by Hope (United Kingdom). Myrtle was subsequently taken into Newhaven, Sussex by Hope.
Sylph	United Kingdom	The ship was driven ashore at Poole, Dorset.

== 6 December ==
List of shipwrecks: 6 December 1869
Ship	State	Description
Aglae	France	The brig was abandoned in the Atlantic Ocean (46°48′N 11°24′W). Her crew were rescued by the schooner Miss Beech (United Kingdom). Aglae was on a voyage from Swansea, Glamorgan, United Kingdom to Cherbourg, Seine-Inférieure.
Alma	United Kingdom	The ship collided with Koodan (Prussia) and sank at Havre de Grâce, Seine-Inférieure, France. She was on a voyage from Newcastle upon Tyne, Northumberland to Caen, Calvados, France.
Betsey	United Kingdom	The ship was driven ashore at Trelleborg, Sweden. She was on a voyage from Riga, Russia to Montrose, Forfarshire. She was refloated and taken into Helsingør, Denmark.
Columbine	United Kingdom	The schooner was driven ashore at Wexford. Her five crew were rescued by the Wexford No.2 Lifeboat. She was on a voyage from Dublin to Wexford.
Dusty Miller	United Kingdom	The ship was driven ashore at Padstow, Cornwall. She was on a voyage from Callao, Peru to Padstow.
Hannah Jane	United Kingdom	The ship foundered in the North Sea. She was on a voyage from Sunderland, County Durham to Hamburg.
Iowa	United Kingdom	The steamship was driven ashore at Kilcreggan, Argyllshire. She was on a voyage from New York to Glasgow, Renfrewshire. She was refloated.
Luigia	Austria-Hungary	The barque was driven ashore at Malamocco, Italy. Her crew were rescued. She was on a voyage from Newcastle upon Tyne, Northumberland, United Kingdom to Venice, Italy.
Margaret, and Mary Ann	United Kingdom	The brig Margaret collided with Mary Ann off Cromer, Norfolk and both vessels sank. All six crew of Margaret and seven crew of Mary Ann got into a boat together. They were rescued by Cromer fishermen.
Mary Ann	United Kingdom	The brig was severely damaged by fire at Grangemouth, Stirlingshire with the loss of one life.

== 7 December ==
List of shipwrecks: 7 December 1869
Ship	State	Description
Anglian	United Kingdom	The steamship was driven ashore at the North Foreland, Kent. She was on a voyage from Rotterdam, South Holland, Netherlands to Messina, Sicily, Italy. She was refloated and taken into Ramsgate, Kent.
Aspasia	United Kingdom	The ship was driven ashore near Bridgwater, Somerset.
Bretonne	France	The schooner ran aground on the Goodwin Sands, Kent. She was refloated and resumed her voyage.
Cuban	United Kingdom	The ship departed from Greenock, Renfrewshire for Cárdenas, Cuba. No further trace, presumed foundered with the loss of all hands.
Brunette	United Kingdom	The ship was abandoned in the Atlantic Ocean 80 nautical miles (150 km) west of the Isles of Scilly. Eleven of her 37 crew landed in the Isles of Scilly in their boat; the rest were rescued by the brig Castle Eden (United Kingdom). Brunette was on a voyage from Quebec City, Canada to Hull, Yorkshire. She was taken into Brest, Finistère, France in a derelict condition on 23 December. She was declared a total loss.
Espoir	France	The brig foundered in the Atlantic Ocean. Her crew were rescued. She was on a voyage from Pentewan, Cornwall, United Kingdom to Naples, Italy.
Gall	United Kingdom	The yacht ran aground on the Maplin Sand, in the North Sea off the coast of Essex. She was on a voyage from Scarborough, Yorkshire to Glasgow, Renfrewshire.
Hordaland	Norway	The ship was wrecked on the Haisborough Sands, in the North Sea off the coast of Norfolk, United Kingdom. Her crew were rescued. She was on a voyage from Bergen to Queenstown, County Cork, United Kingdom.
Kortenar	Netherlands	The ship ran aground near Hellevoetsluis, Zeeland.
Manolo	Spain	The brig ran aground on the Brake Sand. She was on a voyage from Antwerp, Belgium tob Havana, Cuba. She was refloated but ran aground on the Goodwin Sands. She was again refloated and taken into Ramsgate in a leaky condition.
P. C. Merryman	United Kingdom	The ship was driven ashore at Bordeaux, Gironde, France. She was on a voyage from the Chincha Islands, Peru to Bordeaux.
Royalist	United Kingdom	The ship was driven ashore near Bridgwater.
Stella	United Kingdom	The ship ran aground and was abandoned off Hunstanton, Norfolk. She was on a voyage from Kronstadt, Russia to London.

== 8 December ==
List of shipwrecks: 8 December 1869
Ship	State	Description
Annechina Henrietta	Netherlands	The ship was driven ashore and wrecked on Saaremaa, Russia. Her crew were rescued. She was on a voyage from Liverpool, Lancashire, United Kingdom to Riga, Russia.
Eagle	United Kingdom	The schooner was driven ashore at Port Dinorwic, Caernarfonshire. She was on a voyage from Dieppe, Seine-Inférieure, France to Runcorn, Cheshire.
Ems	United Kingdom	The steamship ran aground on the Haisborough Sands, in the North Sea off the coast of Norfolk. She was on a voyage from Goole, Yorkshire to Ghent, East Flanders, Belgium. She was refloated and taken into Great Yarmouth, Norfolk.
Gertrude	United Kingdom	The ship was driven ashore on Roman Key, Cuba (date of report from Havana).

== 9 December ==
List of shipwrecks: 9 December 1869
Ship	State	Description
Anne	United Kingdom	The ship was wrecked south of Filey, Yorkshire.
Annie	United Kingdom	The schooner sprang a leak and foundered off Scarborough, Yorkshire. Her crew were rescued by a brig.
Emilie	(flag) Netherlands	The galiot collided with the steamship Gnome (United Kingdom) and sank off Skagen, Denmark. Her crew were resched. She was on a voyage from Helsingborg, Sweden to Hull, Yorkshire, United Kingdom.
Good Tidings	United Kingdom	The ship was run into by Majestic (United Kingdom) and sank at Great Yarmouth, Norfolk. Her crew were rescued.
May	United Kingdom	The barque was wrecked near Port-la-Nouvelle, Aude, France with the probable loss of all hands. She was on a voyage from India to a British port.
Otto	Sweden	The brigantine collided with the brig Dorothy Thompson (United Kingdom) and was then driven ashore and wrecked at St. Mary's, Isles of Scilly, United Kingdom. Her crew were rescued. She was on a voyage from Jakobstad, Grand Duchy of Finland to Bristol, Gloucestershire, United Kingdom.
Pei Ho	United States	The steamship foundered off the coast of Japan. Her crew survived.
Santissima Trinidad	Spain	The brigantine ran aground on the Puercas and sank. She was on a voyage from Seville to Tenerife, Canary Islands.
Sarah	United Kingdom	The ship foundered off Bardsey Island, Pembrokeshire. Her crew were rescued. She was on a voyage from Portmadoc, Caernarfonshire to Liverpool, Lancashire.
Seaham	United Kingdom	The ship was wrecked south of Filey.
Tyne Queen	United Kingdom	The steamship ran aground near Garston, Lancashire. She was on a voyage from Huelva, Spain to Liverpool, Lancashire.
Unnamed	Flag unknown	The ship was wrecked at Speeton, Yorkshire with the loss of all hands.

== 10 December ==
List of shipwrecks: 10 December 1869
Ship	State	Description
Anna Helene	Hamburg	The ship ran aground on the Flemish Banks, in the North Sea. She was on a voyage from Hamburg to Porto, Portugal. She was refloated and taken into Ramsgate, Kent, United Kingdom in a leaky condition.
Blanche	United Kingdom	The ship sprang a leak and was abandoned 18 nautical miles (33 km) off the Old Head of Kinsale, County Cork. Her crew took to a boat and a raft. They were rescued by a smack and a pilot boat respectively. She was on a voyage from Swansea, Glamorgan to Southampton, Hampshire.
Egyptian	United Kingdom	The steamship ran aground on Taylor's Bank, in Liverpool Bay. She was on a voyage from Alexandria, Egypt to Liverpool, Lancashire. She was refloated and taken into Liverpool.
Elleray	United Kingdom	The barque stranded on the Matelotes Reef, west of the Pellew Islands, Northern Territory, Australia, and became a total wreck; the crew were saved.
Frederickstad	Norway	The ship foundered. Her crew were rescued. She was on a voyage from Stockholm, Sweden to Rochester, Kent.
Joshua	Canada	The barque ran aground on the Goodwin Sands, Kent. She was on a voyage from Antwerp, Belgium to Cardiff, Glamorgan, United Kingdom. Also described as ashore at Southsand Head, near Falmouth, Cornwall, United Kingdom.
Ludwig	Flag unknown	The ship was wrecked near Cette, Hérault, France with the loss of her captain.
Magellan	France	The ship was driven ashore near Gibraltar. She was on a voyage from Cette, Hérault to Fécamp, Seine-Inférieure.
Magnus	Sweden	The brig was damaged at Buenos Aires, Argentina.
Montagu	United Kingdom	The steamship ran aground at Hantoon, County Wexford. She was refloated.
Otto	(Russian Empire) Grand Duchy of Finland	The ship was wrecked in the Isles of Scilly, United Kingdom. She was on a voyage from Jakobstad to Bristol, Gloucestershire, United Kingdom.
Santa Andrea	Kingdom of Italy	The ship was wrecked on the coast of Calabria.
Susan	United Kingdom	The schooner was driven ashore at Drigg, Cumberland. Her five crew were rescued by rocket apparatus. She was on a voyage from Dublin to Whitehaven, Cumberland.
Talitha	United Kingdom	The brigantine was driven ashore and wrecked at Pakefield, Suffolk. Her crew were rescued. She was on a voyage from Rochester, Kent to Hartlepool, County Durham.

== 11 December ==
List of shipwrecks: 11 December 1869
Ship	State	Description
Anne Fisher	United Kingdom	The barque collided with John Rennie (United Kingdom) and was abandoned in the Irish Sea 20 nautical miles (37 km) north by west of Holyhead, Anglesey and was abandoned by her crew, who were rescued by John Rennie. Ann Fisher was on a voyage from Glasgow, Renfrewshire to Callao, Peru. She was taken in tow by the tug Kingfisher (United Kingdom). Her crew subsequently reboarded her and she was towed into Holyhead.
HMS Bristol	Royal Navy	The Bristol-class frigate ran aground. She was subsequently refloated, repaired and returned to service.
Carlton	United Kingdom	The collier, a brig, foundered in the North Sea off Scarborough, Yorkshire. Her crew survived. She was on a voyage from Sunderland, County Durham to Caen, Calvados, France.
Chillian	United Kingdom	The schooner was driven ashore near Maryport, Cumberland. She was on a voyage from Liverpool, Lancashire to Maryport.
Duncan	United Kingdom	The ship was wrecked on the Cerebus Rock, off Arichat, Nova Scotia, Canada and sank. She was on a voyage from Prince Edward Island, Canada to Bristol, Gloucestershire.
Francois and Marie	France	The ship was driven ashore at Orisano, Sardinia, Italy.
Harvest Queen	United Kingdom	The ship was wrecked at Maldonado, Uruguay with the loss of all but two of her crew. She was on a voyage from Cardiff, Glamorgan to Montevideo, Uruguay.
Hawthorn	United Kingdom	The ship was severely damaged at Buenos Aires.
Helens	United Kingdom	The ship was driven ashore at Point India, Uruguay.
J. M. Morales	United Kingdom	The ship was severely damaged at Buenos Aires.
Kelvia	United Kingdom	The ship was severely damaged at Buenos Aires.
Marion	United Kingdom	The ship was driven ashore at Colonia del Sacramento, Uruguay.
Marius Cæsar	France	The ship collided with another vessel and was beached at Montevideo. She was on a voyage from Havre de Grâce, Seine-Inférieure to Montevideo. She was consequently condemned.
Mary Nelson	United Kingdom	The ship ran aground at Hull, Yorkshire. She was on a voyage from Montevideo to Hull.
Nueva Borigaen	Flag unknown	The ship was driven onto a sunken wreck at Buenos Aires, Argentina and was holed.
Porta Cœli	France	The ship caught fire at Saint-Pierre, Martinique and was scuttled.
Reine	France	The schooner was driven ashore in Ballyteague Bay. She was on a voyage from Nantes. Loire-Inférieure to the Clyde. She was consequently condemned.
Roderick Dhu	United Kingdom	The barque was wrecked near Tarifa, Spain. She was on a voyage from Livorno, Italy to Newcastle upon Tyne, Northumberland.
Roebuck	United Kingdom	The ship was severely damaged at Buenos Aires.
Royal William	United Kingdom	The ship ran aground in the Rock Channel. She was on a voyage from Dublin to Liverpool, Lancashire.
Sarmiento	United Kingdom	The ship was driven ashore at Buenos Aires.
Sylphide	Flag unknown	The barque was driven ashore in the River Plate at Mercedes, Uruguay. She was refloated in February 1870 and taken into Buenos Aires, Argentina. She was consequently condemned.
Victor Eleanore	(flag) France	The schooner sank in the River Usk. She was on a voyage from Saint-Valery-sur-Somme, Somme to Newport, Monmouthshire, United Kingdom. She was refloated on 13 December and taken into Newport in a waterlogged condition.
Volga	United Kingdom	The steamship ran aground at Hull. She was on a voyage from Hull to Copenhagen, Denmark.
Wellington	United Kingdom	The ship was driven ashore at Seaford, Sussex. She was refloated.
Whirlwind	United Kingdom	The full-rigged ship ran aground on the Bronwer Reef, in the Java Sea. She was on a voyage from Hong Kong to Melbourne, Australia. She was refloated on 14 December with assistance from Oliver Cromwell (United Kingdom) and Rajah (India). Whirlwind resumed her voyage on 19 December.
Xanthe	United Kingdom	The steamship collided with the steamship R. L. Alston (United Kingdom) and sank in the North Sea off the cost of Norfolk. Her eighteen crew took to the boats; they were rescued by a fishing smack. Xanthe was on a voyage from South Shields, County Durham to Gibraltar.

== 12 December ==
List of shipwrecks: 12 December 1869
Ship	State	Description
Commerce de Paris	France	The ship was driven ashore in Bigbury Bay. Her crew were rescued. She was on a voyage from Havre de Grâce, Seine-Inférieure to Rio de Janeiro, Brazil.
Forest Queen	United Kingdom	The brigantine ran aground on the Platters, in the North Sea off the coast of Essex. She was refloated with assistance from the smack Syren and the yawls Equivalent and Trio (all United Kingdom).
Meteor	United States	The yacht was wrecked 5 nautical miles (9.3 km) from Cape Bon, Beylik of Tunis. Her crew were rescued by the steamship Lancefield (United Kingdom). Meteor was on a voyage from Malta to Tunis, Beylik of Tunis.

== 13 December ==
List of shipwrecks: 13 December 1869
Ship	State	Description
Adina	United Kingdom	The schooner ran aground on the Holme Sand, in the North Sea off the coast of Suffolk. Her eight crew were rescued by the Lowestoft Lifeboat Letitia ( Royal National Lifeboat Institution). Adina was on a voyage from Falmouth, Cornwall to Aberdeen.
Blanche Barkley	New Zealand	The fishing cutter was wrecked off Taiaroa Head, New Zealand, capsizing with the loss of both men on board.
Concord	United Kingdom	The ship was driven ashore at Kilroot Point, County Antrim. Her crew survived. She was on a voyage from Carrickfergus, County Antrim to Bangor, Caernarfonshire.
Contessa	Italy	The barque was driven ashore on Oyster Island, County Sligo, United Kingdom. She was refloated.
Corliana	United Kingdom	The schooner was driven ashore and wrecked near Llanmadoc, Glamorgan, Wales. Her crew were rescued. She was on a voyage from Clonakilty, County Cork to Newport, Monmouthshire.
Industry	United Kingdom	The schooner was driven ashore and damaged at Dover, Kent. She was on a voyage from Swansea, Glamorgan to Dover. She was later refloated and taken into Dover for repairs.
Luck's All	United Kingdom	The ship was driven ashore in the Humber. She was refloated and taken into Hedon Haven.
Pearl	United Kingdom	The ketch caught fire and was beached at Great Yarmouth, Norfolk, where she burnt out. Her crew were rescued. She was on a voyage from Harwich, Essex to Sunderland, County Durham.
Queen Victoria	United Kingdom	The brig was run into by the schooner Emily Stewart and sank 4 nautical miles (7.4 km) off Hartlepool, County Durham. Her crew were rescued by a pilot coble. She was on a voyage from Hastings, Sussex to Hartlepool.
Robert Hastie	United Kingdom	The barque was wrecked on St. Patrick's Bridge, off the Saltee Islands, County Wexford. Her sixteen crew survived. She was on a voyage from Dalhousie, New Brunswick, Canada to Liverpool, Lancashire.
Ryvingen	Norway	The barque collided with another vessel and was severely damaged. She was on a voyage from Sundsvall, Sweden to Dundee, Forfarshire, United Kingdom. She put into Mandal, where she was condemned.
St. Antonius	Netherlands	The ship was wrecked.
Ville de Bordeaux	France	The ship was driven ashore north of Fredrikshavn, Denmark. She was on a voyage from Sunderland to Stettin. She was refloated and taken into Fredrikshavn.
Unnamed	France	The schooner was driven ashore at Cushendun, County Antrim.

== 14 December ==
List of shipwrecks: 14 December 1869
Ship	State	Description
Annie Fisher	United Kingdom	The barque collided with John Rennie (United Kingdom) and was abandoned in the Irish Sea. Her crew were rescued by John Rennie, but were later put back on board and she was towed into Holyhead, Anglesey by the tug Kingfisher (United Kingdom). Annie Fisher was on a voyage from Glasgow, Renfrewshire to Callao, Peru.
Auguste	France	The smack was wrecked. Her five crew were rescued by Neera (United Kingdom).
Bieblo	Chile	The barque foundered in the Pacific Ocean off the coast of Chile. Her crew survived.
Bretagne	United Kingdom	The ship collided with Semiramis (France) and sank. She was on a voyage from Swansea, Glamorgan, United Kingdom to Nantes, Loire-Inférieure, France.
Carl	Stralsund	The brig was wrecked at the mouth of the Gironde.
Carumia	Italy	The ship was wrecked at Agrigento, Sicily. Her crew were rescued.
Dudgeon	United Kingdom	The ship was driven ashore near Mostyn, Flintshire. Her crew were rescued. She was on a voyage from Port Dinorwic, Caernarfonshire to Liverpool, Lancashire.
Ellen	United Kingdom	The ship was wrecked at Agrigento. Her crew were rescued.
Ivanhoe	United Kingdom	The steamship was driven ashore and wrecked on Heligoland. Her crew were rescued. she was on a voyage from South Shields, County Durham to Hamburg.
Leith Packet	United Kingdom	The smack was driven ashore and wrecked 4 nautical miles (7.4 km)from Holyhead with the loss of all hands.
Northumberland Maid	United Kingdom	The schooner was driven ashore at Campbeltown, Argyllshire.
Paragon	United Kingdom	The schooner was driven ashore at Cairnbulg Point, Aberdeenshire. Her crew were rescued by the Coastguard using rocket apparatus. She was on a voyage from Wick, Caithness to Sunderland, County Durham.
Shamrock	United Kingdom	The schooner capsized and sank in the River Barrow. Her crew were rescued.
Silver Light	United Kingdom	The ship foundered in the North Sea.
Sonerah	France	The steamship was driven ashore at Palavas-les-Flots, Hérault.
Stad Vlissingen	Netherlands	The steamship sank off Vlissingen, Zeeland.
Sydney Lass	United Kingdom	The ship was driven ashore and wrecked in Ballydonegan Bay.

== 15 December ==
List of shipwrecks: 15 December 1869
Ship	State	Description
Branch	United Kingdom	The ship was driven ashore at Penmon, Anglesey. She was on a voyage from Liverpool, Lancashire to Aberdeen.
Express	France	The barque was driven ashore and wrecked in the Isles of Scilly, United Kingdom. She was on a voyage from the Rio Congo to Caen, Calvados.
Grace	United Kingdom	The ship ran aground on the Flemish Banks, in the North Sea off the coast of Belgium. She was on a voyage from Sunderland, County Durham to Gravelines, Nord, France. She was refloated and taken into Ostend, West Flanders, Belgium in a leaky condition.
Grecian	United Kingdom	The steamship was driven ashore during the night and wrecked in Jones Inlet, Long Island, New York State, United States, later breaking in two. All 23 passengers and 17 crew were rescued. She was on a voyage from Palermo, Sicily, Italy to New York with fruit and marble.
Whampoa	United Kingdom	The ship was driven ashore. She was on a voyage from Bristol, Gloucestershire to Newport, Monmouthshire. She was refloated the next day.

== 16 December ==
List of shipwrecks: 16 December 1869
Ship	State	Description
Echo	United Kingdom	The brig was abandoned in the North Sea. Her crew were rescued by the schooner Mary Ann (United Kingdom). Echo was on a voyage from Kronstadt, Russia to London.
Empress	United Kingdom	The schooner was driven ashore and wrecked in St. Bride's Bay. She was on a voyage from Liverpool, Lancashire to Milford Haven, Pembrokeshire.
Jane	United Kingdom	The ship was driven ashore on the coast of County Galway.
Langris	France	The brig was driven ashore and wrecked at Newhaven, Sussex, United Kingdom with the loss of one of her nine crew. Survivors were rescued by the Coastguard.
Mystery	United Kingdom	The schooner was driven ashore 1 nautical mile (1.9 km) east of Chichester, Sussex. Her crew were rescued. She was on a voyage from Poole, Dorset to London.
Nelly	United Kingdom	The sloop was driven ashore and severely damaged at Cherbourg, Seine-Inférieure, France. Her crew were rescued. She was on a voyage from London to Jersey, Channel Islands.
Rival	United Kingdom	The ship ran aground at Lowestoft, Suffolk. She was on a voyage from London to Blyth, Northumberland. She was refloated and taken into Lowestoft in a severely leaky condition.
Rover	United Kingdom	The brig was abandoned in the North Sea by all but her captain. At least one crew member was rescued by the smack United Friends (United Kingdom). Rover was on a voyage from Sunderland, County Durham to Woolwich, Kent.
Sea Adventure	United Kingdom	The ship foundered in the North Sea off Withernsea, Yorkshire. Her crew were rescued. She was on a voyage from Sunderland, County Durham to Saint-Malo, Ille-et-Vilaine, France.
Seine et Tamise No. 2	France	The ship struck the quayside and sank at Fécamp, Seine-Inférieure. She was on a voyage from Paris to London, United Kingdom.
Seraphina	United Kingdom	The brig was driven ashore at Seaford, Sussex with the loss of one of her nine crew. She was on a voyage from Caen, Calvados, France to Swansea, Glamorgan.
Two Sisters	United Kingdom	The collier, a dandy sank off Ryde, Isle of Wight. Her three crew survived.
Unnamed	Flag unknown	The ship sank at the entrance to Loch Ryan.

== 17 December ==
List of shipwrecks: 17 December 1869
Ship	State	Description
Alaska	United States	The ship departed from Shanghai, China for Victoria, British Columbia, Canada. No further trace, presumed foundered with the loss of all hands.
Conquistador	Spain	The ship caught fire in the Indian Ocean 100 leagues (300 nautical miles (560 km) off the Île Amsterdam. She was abandoned on 19 December. Her crew were rescued by Menam (United Kingdom). Conquistador was on a voyage from Dénia to Manila, Spanish East Indies.
Echo	United Kingdom	The brig was driven ashore and wrecked at Sea Palling, Norfolk with the loss of four of her six crew. Survivors were rescued by the Palling Lifeboat Parsee ( Royal National Lifeboat Institution). Echo was on a voyage from West Hartlepool, County Durham to London.
Erromanga	Flag unknown	The ship foundered in the Irish Sea off the coast of Cumberland, United Kingdom.
F. Rieck	Flag unknown	The ship was driven ashore in the Giesse.
Kitty	United Kingdom	The ship foundered in the North Sea. Her crew were rescued.
Lizzie Tindle	United Kingdom	The ship was driven ashore at Cardiff, Glamorgan.
Oscar	United Kingdom	The ship foundered in the North Sea. Her crew were rescued.
Orion	United Kingdom	The ship ran aground on the Swash. She was on a voyage from Taganrog, Russia to Gloucester.
Patrician	United Kingdom	The ship ran aground and was severely damaged at Cardiff, Glamorgan.
Peacock	United Kingdom	The ship was driven ashore and wrecked at Ambleteuse, Pas-de-Calais, France. Her crew were rescued. She was on a voyage from Chichester, Sussex to Newcastle upon Tyne, Northumberland.
Philadelphia	United Kingdom	The ship was driven ashore at Bremen.
Star of the East	United Kingdom	The barque was driven ashore near Filey, Yorkshire. She was on a voyage from Portsmouth, Hampshire to West Hartlepool.
Two Friends	United Kingdom	The ship sank in Gurndey Pool.
Veritas	United Kingdom	The schooner ran aground on the Cockle Sand, in the North Sea off the coast of Suffolk. She was on a voyage from South Shields, County Durham to Cowes, Isle of Wight. She was refloated and taken into Lowestoft, Suffolk in a leaky condition.
Unnamed	Flag unknown	The ship ran aground on the Goodwin Sands, Kent, United Kingdom.

== 18 December ==
List of shipwrecks: 18 December 1869
Ship	State	Description
Bird	United Kingdom	The brig was abandoned in the North Sea. Her crew were rescued by the barque Presto ( Canada). Bird was on a voyage from Sunderland, County Durham to Bruges, West Flanders, Belgium.
Gortuna	Rostock	The ship was abandoned in the North Sea 35 nautical miles (65 km) off Lowestoft, Suffolk, United Kingdom. Her crew were resccued. She was on a voyage from Fowey, Cornwall to Newcastle upon Tyne, Northumberland, United Kingdom.
Kepler	France	The ship was wrecked at Sainte-Marie, Réunion. Her crew were rescued.
Mary Sparks	United Kingdom	The barque was driven ashore on the Dutch coast at the entrance to the Zuyder Zee with the loss of all but one of the seventeen people on board. The survivor was rescued by a pilot boat. She was on a voyage from Jamaica to Hamburg.
Norwegian	United Kingdom	The ship ran aground on a wreck in the Savannah River. She was on a voyage from Savannah, Georgia, United States to Liverpool, Lancashire. She was refloated the next day and resumed her voyage.
Pandora	United Kingdom	The schooner was wrecked on the Blacktail Sand, in the Thames Estuary. Her five crew were rescued by the smack Beatrice (United Kingdom).
Victory	United Kingdom	The schooner was run down by the schooner Priscilla (United Kingdom) and sank. Her crew were rescued.

== 19 December ==
List of shipwrecks: 19 December 1869
Ship	State	Description
Aphrodite	United Kingdom	The ship was wrecked on the Rug van Shortemelk Bank, in the North Sea off the coast of North Holland, Netherlands. Her crew were rescued. She was on a voyage from Sunderland, County Durham to Barcelona, Spain.
Ferdinand	Flag unknown	The barque was wrecked at Minatitlán, Mexico.
Gorgon	French Navy	The paddle corvette was wrecked at Brest, Finistère with the loss of all 127 crew. She was on a voyage from A Coruña, Spain, to Cherbourg, Seine-Inférieure.
Gustav Kraeft	Prussia	The schooner ran aground at Heligoland. She was on a voyage from Salo, Grand Duchy of Finland to Cuxhaven.
I. H. P.	(United Kingdom of Great Britain and Ireland) New South Wales	The steamship sank at Echuca, Australia. She was on a voyage from Echuca to Newcastle.
Messenger	United Kingdom	The ship was driven ashore at Pittsdeep, Isle of Wight. She was on a voyage from Portsmouth, Hampshire to Newport, Isle of Wight. She was refloated and taken into Lymington, Hampshire for repairs.
Mina	United Kingdom	The ship ran aground on the Cork Sand, in the North Sea off the coast of Suffolk. She was on a voyage from Arbroath, Forfarshire to London. She was refloated and assisted into Harwich, Essex.
Narva	United Kingdom	The steamship was driven ashore on Borkum, Prussia and sank. Her crew were rescued. She was on a voyage from Gothenburg, Sweden to London.
Spirit of the Nith	United Kingdom	The steamship was wrecked at Parton, Cumberland. Her eight crew survived. She was on a voyage from Dumfries to Liverpool, Lancashire.
Zouave	United Kingdom	The ship was wrecked at "Tuspani". Her crew were rescued.
Unnamed	United Kingdom	The Thames barge collided with the steamship Columbine and sank in the River Thames at Gravesend, Kent.

== 20 December ==
List of shipwrecks: 20 December 1869
Ship	State	Description
Amitie	Belgium	The ship ran aground on the Haisborough Sands, in the North Sea off the coast of Norfolk, United Kingdom. She was refloated and taken into Great Yarmouth, Norfolk in a severely leaky condition.
Aphrodite	United Kingdom	The ship was driven ashore at "Alle". She was on a voyage from Sunderland, County Durham to Barcelona, Spain.
Betty Suzanne	United Kingdom	The ship was driven ashore at "Brandosand". She was on a voyage from the Clyde to Copenhagen, Denmark.
Caroline Louisa	United Kingdom	The ship was driven ashore at Audresselles, Pas-de-Calais, France. Her crew were rescued. She was on a voyage from Taranto, Italy to Hull, Yorkshire.
Christiana	United Kingdom	The Thames barge sank off the Isle of Sheppey, Kent with the loss of all eight people on board.
Ellen Radford	United Kingdom	The barque collided with the steamship Orion (United Kingdom and sank in the English Channel 6 nautical miles (11 km) south east of Beachy Head, Sussex with the loss of ten of her eleven crew. The survivor was rescued by the lighter Falmouth (United Kingdom). Ellen Radford was on a voyage from "Mexillones" to Newcastle upon Tyne, Northumberland.
Emmanuel	United Kingdom	The ship was driven ashore at Scheveningen, South Holland, Netherlands.
Fenne	Bremen	The ship ran aground in the Weser. She was on a voyage from London, United Kingdom to Bremen.
Fortuna	Rostock	The ship was abandoned. She was on a voyage from Fowey, Cornwall to Newcastle upon Tyne, Northumberland, United Kingdom.
Suez	Austria-Hungary	The barque was abandoned off New Quay, Carmarthenshire, United Kingdom. Her crew were rescued by the New Quay Lifeboat.

== 21 December ==
List of shipwrecks: 21 December 1869
Ship	State	Description
Epaminondas	United Kingdom	The ship was abandoned in the North Sea off Texel, North Holland, Netherlands. She was on a voyage from Odesa, Russia to Peterhead, Aberdeenshire.
Jessie Banfield	United Kingdom	The schooner was abandoned in the North Sea. Her crew were rescued by Africaine (Hamburg).
J. Cummings	United States	The ship was driven ashore at Terneuzen, Zeeland, Netherlands. She was on a voyage from Philadelphia, Pennsylvania to Antwerp, Belgium.
Vesta	United Kingdom	The brig ran aground on the Haisborough Sands, in the North Sea off the coast of Norfolk and was abandoned by her crew. She was on a voyage from Sunderland, County Durham to Rochester, Kent.

== 22 December ==
List of shipwrecks: 22 December 1869
Ship	State	Description
Celt	United Kingdom	The ship departed from Birkenhead, Cheshire for Buenos Aires, Argentina. No further trace, presumed foundered with the loss of all hands.
Daisy	United Kingdom	The schooner capsized off the mouth of the River Tees with the loss of all hands. She was towed into Middlesbrough, Yorkshire by the tug Dauntless (United Kingdom).
Fancy	United Kingdom	The ship was wrecked on the Buxey Sand, in the North Sea off the coast of Essex. Her crew were rescued. She was on a voyage from Middlesbrough to Lisbon, Portugal.
Jessie	United Kingdom	The schooner was driven ashore at Rhyl, Denbighshire. Her crew were rescued by the Rhyl Lifeboat Morgan ( Royal National Lifeboat Institution).
Louisa Jane	United Kingdom	The ship was driven ashore at Drogheda, County Louth. She was on a voyage from Ayr to Drogheda. She was refloated on 29 December and taken into Drogheda.
Mary	United Kingdom	The schooner was driven ashore at Wexford. She was on a voyage from Bangor to Wexford.
Luigie	Italy	The ship departed from Liverpool, Lancashire, United Kingdom for Alexandria, Egypt. No further trace, presumed foundered with the loss of all hands.
Mary Young	United Kingdom	The brig was wrecked on the North Gar Sands, off the mouth of the River Tees. Her crew were rescued by the Seaton Carew Lifeboat Charlotte ( Royal National Lifeboat Institution). Mary Young was on a voyage from West Hartlepool, County Durham to Gävle. Sweden.
Messenger	United Kingdom	The ship was abandoned in the Atlantic Ocean 300 nautical miles (560 km) west of Ouessant, Finistère, France. Her crew were rescued. She was on a voyage from Sherbro Island, Sierra Leone to Liverpool.
Opal	United Kingdom	The ship ran aground on the Kentish Knock. She was on a voyage from South Shields, County Durham to Boulogne, Pas-de-Calais, France. She was refloated and assisted into Ramsgate, Kent in a leaky condition.
Providentia	(Russian Empire) Grand Duchy of Finland	The full-rigged ship was wrecked on the Goodwin Sands, Kent with the loss of one of her fifteen crew. Three of the survivors were rescued by the Ramsgate Lifeboat Bradford ( Royal National Lifeboat Institution).
Vigilant	United Kingdom	The schooner was wrecked at Hayle, Cornwall. Her six crew were rescued by the Hayle Lifeboat Isis ( Royal National Lifeboat Institution).
Viking	United Kingdom	The steamship was driven ashore at Fraserburgh, Aberdeenshire. She was on a voyage from Arkhangelsk, Russia to Dundee, Forfarshire. She was refloated and taken into Aberdeen.

== 23 December ==
List of shipwrecks: 23 December 1869
Ship	State	Description
Abbotsford	United Kingdom	The brig was driven ashore on Coquet Island, Northumberland.
Camelia	United Kingdom	The ship was driven ashore at the White Cliffs, in the Dardanelles.
Carl Agrell	Rostock	The barque was wrecked on the Longsand, in the North Sea off the coast of Essex, United Kingdom with the loss of two of her crew. Her crew were rescued by the smacks Deerhound and Increase (both United Kingdom). Carl Agrell was on a voyage from South Shields, County Durham, United Kingdom to Odesa, Russia.
Caroline	United Kingdom	The ship was abandoned in Carnarvon Bay. Her crew were rescued by the steamship St. Oswin (United Kingdom). Caroline was on a voyage from Liverpool, Lancashire to South Shields. She was taken into Holyhead, Anglesey by a smack.
Catherine	United Kingdom	The brig was driven ashore at Ostend, West Flanders, Belgium. Her crew were rescued. She was on a voyage from Sunderland, County Durham to Ostend. She subsequently broke up.
Channel Queen	(United Kingdom of Great Britain and Ireland) Guernsey	The ship was driven ashore in the River Thames at Gravesend, Kent. She was on a voyage from London to Adelaide, South Australia. She was refloated and put back to London.
Charles Tucker	United Kingdom	The ship ran aground at Portreath, Cornwall. She was on a voyage from Neath, Glamorgan to Portreath. She was refloated and taken into Portreath in a waterlogged condition.
Clara	United Kingdom	The ship collided with another vessel and sank off the Nore. She was on a voyage from London to Mossel Bay, Cape Colony.
Cornucopia	United Kingdom	The ship ran aground on the Holm Sand, in the North Sea off the coast of Suffolk. She was on a voyage from South Shields to Lisbon, Portugal. She was refloated and beached at Lowestoft, Suffolk. Her crew were rescued. Cornucopia was refloated on 1 January 1870 and towed into Lowestoft.
Good Tidings	United Kingdom	The yawl was run into by the brigantine Majestic (United Kingdom) and sank off Great Yarmouth, Norfolk. Her three crew were rescued by the schooner Worsley (United Kingdom).
Granville	France	The ship was driven ashore at "Cordonnan". She was on a voyage from Havre de Grâce, Seine-Inférieure to Cádiz, Spain.
Ladyburn	United Kingdom	The ship departed from Lamlash, Isle of Arran for Bombay, India. No further trace, presumed foundered with the loss of all hands.
New Express	United Kingdom	The brig sprang a leak and foundered in the North Sea off Flamborough Head, Yorkshire. Her crew were rescued by the schooner Aid (United Kingdom). New Express was on a voyage from South Shields to Alicante, Spain.
Rheinfell	Bavaria	The steamship suffered a boiler explosion and foundered in Lake Constance with the loss of seven lives. She was on a voyage from Schaffhausen, Switzerland to Konstanz.
Vesta	United Kingdom	The ship was driven ashore at Saltburn-by-the-Sea, Yorkshire.
Unnamed	United Kingdom	The brig ran aground on the Goodwin Sands, Kent. She was on a voyage from London to the Cape of Good Hope, Cape Colony. She was refloated on 29 December and taken into Ramsgate, Kent.

== 24 December ==
List of shipwrecks: 24 December 1869
Ship	State	Description
Agathe	Stettin	The schooner was wrecked on the Holm Sand, in the North Sea off the coast of Suffolk, United Kingdom. She was on a voyage from Stettin to Bordeaux, Gironde, France. Her crew were rescued the next day by the Lowestoft Lifeboat Letitia ( Royal National Lifeboat Institution).
Apollo	United Kingdom	The schooner ran aground on the Black Middens, in the North Sea off the coast of County Durham. She was refloated with assistance from the paddletug Reliance (United Kingdom) and taken into South Shields in a leaky condition.
Constantia	Bremen	The full-rigged ship ran aground on the Goodwin Sands, Kent, United Kingdom. She was on a voyage from Bremen to New Orleans, Louisiana, United States. She was refloated with assistance from the tugs Aid and Palmerston (both United Kingdom) and the Ramsgate Lifeboat Bradford ( Royal National Lifeboat Institution) and taken into Ramsgate, Kent in a leaky condition.
Englishman	United Kingdom	The ship was driven ashore and wrecked at Drogheda, County Louth. She was on a voyage from Workington, Cumberland to Drogheda.
Genevieve	France	The steamship foundered in the North Sea off Flamborough Head, Yorkshire, United Kingdom with the loss of nine of her ten crew. The survivor was rescued by the steamship Marion (United Kingdom). Genevieve was on a voyage from Middlesbrough, Yorkshire to Dieppe, Seine-Inférieure.
Helene	Hamburg	The steamship collided with the steamship Planet (United Kingdom) and sank at Blankenese. She was refloated and taken into Hamburg.
Hendrik Cristensen	Norway	The barque was abandoned in the North Sea. Her crew were rescued by the steamship Milo (United Kingdom). Hendrik Cristensen was on a voyage from London, United Kingdom to Risør. She was discovered on 1 January 1870 by the fishing smacks Noord Star and Noord Zee (both Netherlands) and taken into the River Tyne.
J. A. Grepenstadt	Russia	The ship was damaged by fire at Birkenhead, Cheshire, United Kingdom.
M. E. Clarke	United Kingdom	The steamship was run ashore near Dover, Kent. Her crew were rescued. She was later refloated and taken into Dover.
Ogir	United Kingdom	The ship was damaged by fire at Birkenhead.
Rose Ann	New Zealand	The 26-ton schooner stranded on a sandspit in the Whangapoua Harbour and became a wreck.
Ulrica	Sweden	The barque departed from Newcastle upon Tyne, Northumberland for Havana, Captaincy General of Cuba. She was subsequently abandoned at sea. Her crew were rescued by the steamship Wyvern (United Kingdom). Ulrica was discovered on 14 January 1870 by the steamship Brenda (United Kingdom); she was taken into Plymouth, Devon, United Kingdom.

== 25 December ==
List of shipwrecks: 25 December 1869
Ship	State	Description
Hayle	United Kingdom	The steamship ran aground on the Scroby Sands, Norfolk. She was refloated with assistance and resumed her voyage.
Maggie Ann Steward	United Kingdom	The ship foundered off Lismore, Inner Hebrides. Her crew survived.
Samuel Dixon	United Kingdom	The ship ran aground on the Long Bank, off the coast of County Wexford. She was on a voyage from Portmadoc, Caernarfonshire to Wexford. She was refloated and taken into Wexford in a waterlogged condition.

== 26 December ==
List of shipwrecks: 26 December 1869
Ship	State	Description
Haidee	United Kingdom	The schooner was driven ashore and wrecked at Seaham, County Durham with the loss of a crew member. She was on a voyage from Montrose, Forfarshire to London.
Lady Augusta	United Kingdom	The Mersey Flat foundered in the Irish Sea off the North West Lightship ( Trinity House). Her three crew were rescued by the steamship Prince of Wales (United Kingdom). Lady Augusta was on a voyage from Liverpool, Lancashire to Beaumaris, Anglesey.
Leeds	United Kingdom	The steamship collided with the steamship Zephyr (United Kingdom) and sank in the Voorne Canal at Hellevoetsluis, Zeeland, Netherlands. She was refloated on 27 December.
Ricards	Canada	The brig was driven ashore at Bolt Tail, Devon, United Kingdom. She was refloated with assistance from the Coastguard and taken into Salcombe, Devon.
Viscount Macduff	United Kingdom	The schooner was wrecked on the Black Middens, in the North Sea off the coast of County Durham with the loss of two of her crew. Survivors were rescued by the South Shields Lifeboats Goole and Pomfret (both Royal National Lifeboat Institution). Viscount Macduff was on a voyage from Montrose, Forfarshire to Exeter, Devon. She was refloated on 30 December and taken into port.
Warner	United Kingdom	The brig was driven ashore and wrecked at Blyth, Northumberland. Her six crew were rescued. She was on a voyage from Aberdeen to Sunderland, County Durham.

== 27 December ==
List of shipwrecks: 27 December 1869
Ship	State	Description
Amie, or Anni	(Russian Empire) Grand Duchy of Finland	The schooner was driven ashore on Dragør, Denmark. She was on a voyage from Härnösand, Sweden to London, United Kingdom.
Azalea	United Kingdom	The ship was sighted off Gibraltar whilst on a voyage from Constanţa, Ottoman Empire to an English port. No further trace, presumed foundered with the loss of all eleven crew.
Bisoka	Flag unknown	The brig was wrecked on the Goodwin Sands, Kent, United Kingdom.
Fling	United Kingdom	The ship ran aground on the Scheelhoek, off the Dutch coast. She was on a voyage from Rotterdam, South Holland, Netherlands to Cardiff, Glamorgan. She was refloated and taken into Hellevoetsluis, Zeeland, Netherlands.
Kate Sophia	United Kingdom	The ship was sighted in Mounts Bay whilst on a voyage from King's Lynn, Norfolk to Cork. No further trace, presumed foundered with the loss of all hands.
Lady Washington	United Kingdom	The schooner was driven ashore near Ballycastle, County Antrim. She was on a voyage from Belfast, County Antrim to Ballina, County Mayo.
Laurel	United Kingdom	The steamship ran aground in the Clyde upstream of Dumbarton. She was on a voyage from Glasgow, Renfrewshire to Portrush, County Antrim. She was refloated the next day.
Lutha	United Kingdom	The schooner was driven ashore at Whitby, Yorkshire. Her six crew were rescued by the Whitby Lifeboat. She was on a voyage from Leith, Lothian to Bruges, East Flanders, Belgium.
Queen of the Chase	United Kingdom	The ship ran aground on the Newcombe Sand, in the North Sea off the coast of Suffolk. She was on a voyage from São Miguel Island, Azores to Hull, Yorkshire. She was refloated and taken into Lowestoft, Suffolk.
Rockhampton	United Kingdom	The full-rigged ship caught fire and sank in the Atlantic Ocean (40°30′N 15°30′W). Her crew were rescued by White Adder (United Kingdom). Rockhampton was on a voyage from Oran, Algeria to Newcastle upon Tyne, Northumberland.
Sarah Ann	United Kingdom	The smack foundered off the Wolf Rock, Cornwall. Her crew were rescued by Raimondo (United Kingdom). Sarah Ann was on a voyage from Porthgain, Pembrokeshire to London.
Thomasine	United Kingdom	The ship foundered in the Atlantic Ocean 40 nautical miles (74 km) north west of the Isles of Scilly. Her crew survived. she was on a voyage from Newport, Monmouthshire to Kingston, Jamaica.
Times	United Kingdom	The ship departed from Huelva, Spain for the River Tyne. No further trace, presumed foundered with the loss of all hands.
Viscount	United Kingdom	The schooner was driven ashore at Tynemouth, Northumberland. She was on a voyage from Montrose, Forfarshire to Exmouth, Devon.

== 28 December ==
List of shipwrecks: 28 December 1869
Ship	State	Description
Anna	United Kingdom	The ship was wrecked at Porto Empedocle, Sicily, Italy. Her crew were rescued.
Dao Manoel	Brazil	The lighter sank at Pelotas.
Marietta	Italy	The ship was wrecked at Porto Empedocle. Her crew were rescued. She was on a voyage from Marzamemi to Messina.
Queen-of-the-Chase	United Kingdom	The schooner ran aground on the Newcombe Sand, in the North Sea off the coast of Suffolk. She was on a voyage from São Miguel Island, Azores to Hull, Yorkshire. She was refloated and towed into Lowestoft, Suffolk by a tug.
Queen of the Lake	United Kingdom	The steamship was holed by ice and sank in Loch Awe.
Tweed	United Kingdom	The schooner ran aground on the Rhanplate, in the Elbe. She was on a voyage from Hamburg to Aberdeen. She was refloated and resumed her voyage.

== 29 December ==
List of shipwrecks: 29 December 1869
Ship	State	Description
Adelaida	Italy	The barque was driven ashore at Ballyhack, County Wexford, United Kingdom.
Ann	United Kingdom	The ship ran aground on the Sandwich Flats and was wrecked. She was on a voyage from London to Sandwich, Kent.
Apollo	United Kingdom	The ship was sighted off Gibraltar whilst on a voyage from Odesa, Russia to a British port. No further trace, presumed foundered with the loss of all hands.
Courier	United Kingdom	The schooner was driven ashore at Stornoway, Isle of Lewis, Outer Hebrides. She was on a voyage from Liverpool, Lancashire to Aberdeen. She was refloated and beached.
Duke	United Kingdom	The barque was abandoned in the Atlantic Ocean 300 nautical miles (560 km) off Cape Finisterre, Spain. Her twelve crew took to a boat; they were rescued on 30 December by the schooner Edouard ( Grand Duchy of Oldenburg). Duke was on a voyage from South Shields, County Durham to Constantinople. She was discovered the next day by the barque Wave (United Kingdom), which put five of her crew on board. They took her into Falmouth, Cornwall, where she arrived on 14 January 1870.
Elizabeth Ann	United Kingdom	The ship was driven ashore at Penance, Cornwall Her crew were rescued by Lowfreda (United Kingdom). Elizabeth Ann was on a voyage from Par, Cornwall to Runcorn, Cheshire.
Faro de Vigo	Spain	The ship was driven ashore at Cromer, Norfolk, United Kingdom. She was on a voyage from Peterhead, Aberdeenshire, United Kingdom to Vigo.
Gleaner	United Kingdom	The ship was wrecked near Strangford, County Antrim. Her crew survived. She was on a voyage from Bangor to Belfast, County Antrim.
Kate Sophia	United Kingdom	The ship departed from King's Lynn, Norfolk for Cork. No further trace, presumed foundered with the loss of all hands.
Minnie Smith	United States	The ship was driven ashore and wrecked in the Bay of Salerno. Her crew were rescued. She was on a voyage from New York to Naples, Italy.
Winfield Scott	United Kingdom	The ship ran aground on the Middle Ground, in the Thames Estuary off the coast of Essex. She was on a voyage from Callao, Peru to London. She was refloated and resumed her voyage.

== 30 December ==
List of shipwrecks: 30 December 1869
Ship	State	Description
Amelia, and Ouse	United Kingdom	The schooner Amelia and the schooner Ouse collided in the North Sea 4 nautical miles (7.4 km) off Whitby, Yorkshire and were both abandoned in a sinking condition. Their crews were rescued by the tug Vigilant (United Kingdom). Ouse was on a voyage from Seaham, County Durham to Portsmouth, Hampshire.
Anne	United Kingdom	The brig was driven ashore at Tynemouth, Northumberland. Her crew were rescued by the South Shields Lifeboat Northumberland ( Royal National Lifeboat Institution). She was refloated and towed into South Shields, County Durham.
Auguste Lucie	France	The brig foundered in the Atlantic Ocean. Her crew were rescued. She was on a voyage from Swansea, Glamorgan, United Kingdom to Sierra Leone.
Aureliano	Flag unknown	The ship was driven ashore at Camariñas, Spain. She was on a voyage from Sulina, Ottoman Empire to Falmouth, Cornwall. She was a total loss.
Ballah	Spain	The brig was driven ashore and wrecked in Dark Bay, County Cork, United Kingdom. Her crew were rescued. She was on a voyage from Havana, Cuba to Queenstown, County Cork.
Barcelona	Spain	The steamship was driven ashore at Santander. She was refloated.
Blücher	Flag unknown	The brigantine was wrecked on the Trefusis Rocks, on the coast of Cornwall, United Kingdom. Her crew were rescued.
Carniehill	Canada	The ship was wrecked on a reef off the north coast of Saona Island, Dominican Republic. All on board were rescued. She was on a voyage from Windsor, Nova Scotia to Mobile, Alabama, United States.
Charente	United Kingdom	The steamship ran aground at Goole, Yorkshire. She was on a voyage from London to Goole.
Dashing Wave	United Kingdom	The ship was wrecked on the coast of Portugal with the loss of two of her crew. She was on a voyage from Garrucha, Spain to Aberdeen.
Delegate	United Kingdom	The brig was driven ashore and wrecked at Caister-on-Sea, Norfolk. Her nine crew were rescued by the Caister Lifeboat Boys ( Royal National Lifeboat Institution). Delegate was on a voyage from Ipswich, Suffolk to South Shields.
Eduardino	Italy	The brig was driven ashore in Ballycotton Bay. Her crew were rescued. She was on a voyage from Taganrog, Russia to Queenstown, County Cork, United Kingdom.
Etna	Canada	The barque was wrecked in Barry's Cove with the loss of nine lives.
Flora	France	The barque was driven ashore on Chesil Beach, Dorset, United Kingdom. Her eight crew were rescued by the Coastguard using rocket apparatus. She was on a voyage from Cherbourg, Seine-Inférieure to Swansea.
Girondin	France	The brigantine-rigged steamship was driven ashore at Par, Cornwall, United Kingdom. Her crew were rescued by the Par Lifeboat South Warwickshire ( Royal National Lifeboat Institution). Girondin was on a voyage from Bordeaux, Gironde to Belfast, County Antrim, United Kingdom. She was refloated on 3 January 1870 and taken into Par.
Herald	United Kingdom	The ship was abandoned at sea. Twelve of her 25 crew were rescued by the brig Samuel (France). Thirteen crew in the pinnace were reported missing. She was on a voyage from Cardiff, Glamorgan to Rio de Janeiro, Brazil.
Hermes	United Kingdom	The schooner ran aground and was wrecked on the Annat Bank, off Montrose, Forfarshire with the loss of all six crew.
Ida Maria	United Kingdom	The ship was driven ashore and severely damaged in the Isles of Scilly. She was on a voyage from Danzig to Liverpool, Lancashire. She was refloated.
James Steward	United Kingdom	The ship was driven ashore west of Cabo de Santa Maria, Portugal. Her crew were rescued. She was on a voyage from Gibraltar to Pomaron, Portugal.
Königsberg	Prussia	The brig was wrecked near Land's End, Cornwall with the loss of one of her eight crew. She was on a voyage from Buenos Aires, Argentina to Königsberg.
Margaret	United Kingdom	The brigantine was driven ashore and severely damaged 2 nautical miles (3.7 km) north of Ramsey, Isle of Man. Her crew were rescued by rocket apparatus. She was on a voyage from Cardiff to Greenock, Renfrewshire.
Martha	United Kingdom	The ship was driven ashore near Yarmouth, Isle of Wight. She was on a voyage from Newport, Isle of Wight to Southampton, Hampshire. She was refloated and resumed her voyage.
Mary	United Kingdom	The ship was driven ashore near the Mumbles, Glamorgan. She was on a voyage from Appledore, Devon to Swansea.
Novo Pluto, or Nuavo Plato	Austria-Hungary	The brig foundered on the Greengrounds, in the Bristol Channel with loss of life. She was on a voyage from Constanţa, Ottoman Empire to Swansea.
Onward	United Kingdom	The ship was driven ashore at Buckhaven, Fife. She was on a voyage from Peterhead, Aberdeenshire to Sunderland, County Durham.
Osprey	United Kingdom	The smack was driven ashore at Schull, County Cork. Her crew survived.
Produce	United Kingdom	The brig was driven ashore at South Shields. She was refloated and taken into South Shields in a severely leaky condition.
Rapido	Portugal	The schooner was wrecked at Ramsgate, Kent, United Kingdom. Her crew were rescued. She was on voyage from Rotterdam, South Holland, Netherlands to Cardiff, Glamorgan, United Kingdom.
Sainte Fleur	France	The ship was wrecked on the Charpentiers, at the mouth of the Loire. She was on a voyage from Nantes, Loire-Inférieure to Cardiff, Glamorgan, United Kingdom.
Santee	United States	The ship was driven ashore and wrecked at Toe Head, County Cork with the loss of all hands. She was on a voyage from Callao, Peru to Queenstown.
Seazer	United Kingdom	The ship was driven ashore and wrecked at "Barlogue", County Cork with the loss of all hands.
Virginia	Italy	The brig was abandoned in the Atlantic Ocean. Her crew were rescued by Thomas Snowden (United Kingdom). She was on a voyage from Newcastle upon Tyne, Northumberland to Naples.
Young Louisa	(United Kingdom of Great Britain and Ireland) Jersey	The brigantine was driven ashore and wrecked at the mouth of the River Cuckmere. Her crew survived. She was on a voyage from Jersey to Chatham, Kent.
Unnamed	Flag unknown	The schooner foundered off Holyhead, Anglesey with the loss of all hands.
Unnamed	Italy	The ship was abandoned at sea, witnessed by the crew of Herald (United Kingdom). Her crew took to the longboat, survival unknown.
Unnamed	United Kingdom	The brig foundered in Ballycotton Bay with the loss of all hands.
Unnamed	United Kingdom	The ship was driven ashore and wrecked at "Foe", County Cork with the loss of all hands.

== 31 December ==
List of shipwrecks: 31 December 1869
Ship	State	Description
Australasian	United Kingdom	The ship departed from Birkenhead, Cheshire for Aden. No further trace, presumed foundered with the loss of all hands.
Baltimore	United Kingdom	The brigantine foundered in the Atlantic Ocean. Her twelve crew survived.
Bella	Spain	The ship was driven ashore at Galley Head, County Cork, United Kingdom. She was on a voyage from Havana, Cuba to Queenstown, County Cork.
Betsey	United Kingdom	The ship struck the Muggling Rocks, off the coast of Cornwall and foundered. Her crew were rescued.
Betsy	United Kingdom	The schooner was driven ashore and wrecked on Dalkey Island, County Dublin. Her four crew survived. She was on a voyage from Falmouth, Cornwall to Waterford.
HMS Bruiser	Royal Navy	The Britomart-class gunboat was driven ashore. Subsequently refloated, repaired and returned to service.
Caribbean	United Kingdom	The ship was destroyed by fire at sea. Her crew survived.
Caroline	United Kingdom	The ship was driven ashore on Skagen, Denmark with the loss of five of her crew. She was on a voyage from Sunderland, County Durham to Stettin.
Challenge	United Kingdom	The barque ran aground on the Goodwin Sands, Kent. She was refloated with assistance and taken in tow for the River Thames.
Clio	United Kingdom	The brig foundered in the North Sea 40 nautical miles (74 km) off Bridlington, Yorkshire. Her crew were rescued by Hope (United Kingdom). Clio was on a voyage from Hartlepool, County Durham to Shoreham-by-Sea, Sussex.
Edna	Canada	The barque was driven ashore and wrecked in Barry's Cove, County Cork with the loss of nine of the 23 people on board. Survivors were rescued by rocket apparatus. She was on a voyage from Montreal, Quebec to the Clyde.
Ester	United Kingdom	The ship foundered in the Mediterranean Sea. Her crew were rescued. She was on a voyage from Newport, Monmouthshire to Genoa, Italy.
Frithiof	Flag unknown	The ship was driven ashore near Flamanville, Manche, France. She was on a voyage from Rouen, Seine-Inférieure, France to Trieste.
Garibaldi	United Kingdom	The brig collided with a steamship and sank off Whitby, Yorkshire. Her crew were rescued by William and Anne (United Kingdom). Garibaldi was on a voyage from Sunderland to Littlehampton, Sussex.
Gem	United Kingdom	The barque capsized 6 nautical miles (11 km) off Carmarthen with the loss of all hands, between nine and twelve lives. She was on a voyage from Marianople, Russia to Dublin.
Industry	United Kingdom	The brig was wrecked near Cape St. Vincent, Portugal with the loss of a crew member. She was on a voyage from Licata, Sicily, Italy to Leith, Lothian.
Johann Martin	United Kingdom	The ship foundered in the Atlantic Ocean. Her crew were rescued. She was on a voyage from London to Philadelphia, Pennsylvania, United States.
Leo	United Kingdom	The steamship ran aground on the Schulpenplaat, in the North Sea off the coast of South Holland, Netherlands.
Louis and Eugenie	France	The brig was driven ashore and wrecked at Bridport, Dorset, United Kingdom with the loss of two of her crew. She was on a voyage from Luçon, Vendée to Dunkirk, Nord.
Margaret Jane	United Kingdom	The schooner was driven ashore at Ardrossan, Ayrshire.
Oneida	United Kingdom	The ship ran aground. She was on a voyage from London to Briton Ferry, Glamorgan. She was refloated and taken into Swansea.
Operant	United Kingdom	The ship was wrecked on Holy Isle, in the Firth of Clyde. Her crew survived. She was on a voyage from Belfast, County Antrim to Irvine, Ayrshire.
Rivoli	United Kingdom	The ship was driven ashore at Kingstown, County Dublin. She was on a voyage from Montreal to Dublin. She was refloated and taken into Dublin.

== Unknown date ==
List of shipwrecks: Unknown date in December 1869
Ship	State	Description
Alvilde	Sweden	The ship was driven ashore at Kalla, Öland. She was on a voyage from Rio de Janeiro, Brazil to Stockholm.
Anna Henderson	United Kingdom	The ship ran aground in the Hooghly River. She was on a voyage from Rangoon, Burma to Calcutta, India.
Baron von Heemstra	United Kingdom	The ship ran aground off Probolinggo, Netherlands East Indies. She was on a voyage from Surabaya, Netherlands East Indies to Amoy, China. She was refloated and put back to Surabaya, where she arrived on 30 December.
Bonnie Belle	United Kingdom	The schooner ran aground on the Barnard Sand, in the North Sea off the coast of Suffolk in late December. She was on a voyage from Hull, Yorkshire to São Miguel Island, Azores. She was refloated and resumed her voyage.
Bosworth	United Kingdom	The ship foundered north of Pernambuco, Brazil. All on board were rescued; her passengers by Douro (Portugal). Bosworth was on a voyage from Sunderland, County Durham to Batavia, Netherlands East Indies.
Brona Maria	Austria-Hungary	The ship was driven ashore on the Tendra Spit, Ottoman Empire before 2 December.
Brontes	United Kingdom	The ship was driven ashore in Robinson's Bay.
Cannie Scot	United Kingdom	The ship was driven ashore on "Bic Island". She was on a voyage from Montreal, Quebec, Canada to Queenstown, County Cork. She was refloated.
Circassian	United States	The steamship was driven ashore at Manasquan, New Jersey. She was on a voyage from New Orleans, Louisiana to New York. She was refloated on 19 December and towed into New York.
City of New York	United Kingdom	The steamship ran aground at Halifax, Nova Scotia, Canada losing her propeller.
Cobden	United Kingdom	The steamship was driven ashore in the Danube before 22 December. She was refloated and taken into Sulina, Ottoman Empire.
Constance	United Kingdom	The ship was driven ashore at Hartlepool, County Durham.
Crofton	United Kingdom	The ship was attacked by pirates and abandoned off Macao, China before 7 December. Some of her crew were murdered by the pirates and seven were taken prisoner. She was on a voyage from Saigon, French Indo-China to Yokohama, Japan.
Cuban	United Kingdom	The steamship ran aground off Léogâne, Haiti. She was on a voyage from Liverpool, Lancashire to Port-au-Prince, Haiti. She was refloated on 3 December.
Der Floiss	Flag unknown	The ship caught fire at New York. She was on a voyage from New York to Bilbao, Spain.
E. A. Parker	United Kingdom	The ship collided with Golconda (United Kingdom) and sank in the Atlantic Ocean.
Energy	United Kingdom	The ship was abandoned in the Atlantic Ocean. She was on a voyage from Liverpool to Baltimore, Maryland, United States.
Florence	France	The ship sank in the Mediterranean Sea off the coast of Sardinia, Italy between 10 and 17 December. She was on a voyage from Taganrog, Russia to Dunkirk, Nord.
Glenclune	United Kingdom	The ship was abandoned in the South China Sea off Formosa. She was on a voyage from Saigon, French Indo-China to Yokohama, Japan.
Gracioza Mary	Flag unknown	The ship was wrecked at "Wiza". She was on a voyage from Marseille, Bouches-du-Rhône, France to Maracaibo, Venezuela.
Greek	United Kingdom	The steamship was lost with all 23 hands. She was on a voyage from Bordeaux, Gironde, France to Dublin. Also reported as having departed from the Clyde for Rotterdam, South Holland, Netherlands on 2 December. It was rumoured that some of her cargo had washed up on the Welsh coast. In 2025, the likely site of the wreck was identified by a diver in the Celtic Sea, halfway between Cornwall and Ireland.
Imperial	United Kingdom	The steamship was wrecked at "Syndestrand" or "Tydestrand", 8 nautical miles (15 km) east of Arendal, Norway before 17 December. Her crew were rescued.
Ironsides	United Kingdom	The steamship was lost at the mouth of the Loire.
James	United Kingdom	The ship was lost off Tiree, Inner Hebrides before 25 December. Her crew were rescued.
Kendrick Fish	United States	The full-rigged ship was destroyed by fire and sank at Callao, Peru after 8 December. The wreck was refloated in February 1870.
Lady Flora	United Kingdom	The steamship capsized off Heligoland with the loss of three of her crew. She was on a voyage from Königsberg, Prussia to Schiedam, South Holland, Netherlands.
Lady of the Lake	United Kingdom	The ship was wrecked on Eleuthera, Bahamas.
Liverpool	United Kingdom	The ship was abandoned in the South Atlantic before 28 December. Her crew were rescued by Mary Ann (United Kingdom).
Marcello Deamicius	Italy	The ship was wrecked at Capo Passero, Sicily.
Mary Cacace	United Kingdom	The ship was lost whilst on a voyage from Sulina, Ottoman Empire to a British port.
Mathilde Octavie	Canada	The ship was wrecked at "Monte Louis". She was on a voyage from Montreal to Montevideo, Uruguay.
Mist	United States	The barque was destroyed by fire. She was on a voyage from Lota, Chile to San Francisco, California.
Mutter Schultz	United States	The ship was wrecked on the Sugarloaf Reef. She was on a voyage from Pensacola, Florida to London.
Nive	United Kingdom	The schooner sank in Hubberston Pill. Her crew survived. She was on a voyage from Llanelly, Glamorgan to Queenstown, County Cork.
Nora Creina	United Kingdom	The steamship foundered in the South China Sea. Her crew were rescued.
Ocean Queen	United Kingdom	The steamship was wrecked at "Nilga", Japan in early December. Her crew survived.
Onni	United Kingdom	The ship wan aground off "Swanderisi", Ottoman Empire. She was on a voyage from Newcastle upon Tyne, Northumberland to Constantinople, Ottoman Empire. She was refloated.
Onward	United Kingdom	The schooner was wrecked at Breaksea Point, Glamorgan.
Paris Port-de-Mer	France	The ship foundered off the Cape of Good Hope, Cape Colony. She was on a voyage from Paris to India.
Providenza	Italy	The ship was wrecked on the coast of Calabria.
Rochford	United Kingdom	The Thames barge was lost. Her crew were rescued by Emblem (United Kingdom).
Star of the East	United Kingdom	The ship was lost in Chinese waters before 14 December. Her crew were rescued.
Teaser	United Kingdom	The lighter sank off Cape Clear Island, County Cork with the loss of all hands.
Times	United Kingdom	The scbooner departed from Huelva, Spain in late December for South Shields, County Durham. No further trace, presumed foundered with the loss of all hands.
Triumph	Haiti	The casemate ironclad disappeared in the Atlantic Ocean off the United States East Coast, probably off the Delaware Capes or Cape Hatteras, North Carolina, sometime after 19 December while en route from Chester, Pennsylvania to Port au Prince, Haiti, apparently sinking with the loss of all hands.
Unity	United Kingdom	The schooner foundered with the loss of all hands. She was on a voyage from the River Tyne to Great Yarmouth, Norfolk.
Ulloa	United Kingdom	The ship was driven ashore at "Port Kingold".
William	United Kingdom	The ship was driven ashore at Mehdia, Beylik of Tunis. She was refloated and resumed her voyage.
William Wilcox	United States	The ship was driven ashore in Delaware Bay. She was on a voyage from Alicante, Spain to Wilmington, Delaware.
