= Giardinelli =

Giardinelli is a surname. Notable people with the surname include:

- Prince Gaetano Starrabba di Giardinelli (born 1932), former racing driver from Italy
- Mempo Giardinelli (born 1947), Argentine novelist and academic
- Robert Giardinelli (1914–1996), noted musical instrument craftsman
