= Fender Music Foundation =

The Fender Music Foundation (FMF) is a 501(c)(3) organization that grants musical instruments and equipment to ongoing music education programs in the United States. Many of the grants they award go to music education in schools and organizations for underprivileged or mentally disabled children, teenagers and adults.

== History ==
The Fender Music Foundation, formerly The Guitar Center Music Foundation, was established in 2005 in Westlake Village, California, by Larry Thomas when he retired as CEO of Guitar Center, Inc. The foundation became active in 2006, raising $765,000 and awarding its first grants at the end of that year. By the end of 2007, their grants benefited over 10,000 people in 20 states.

To date the foundation has awarded instruments, equipment and money to 65 organizations. Some of these recipients include schools, educational centers for those who are to be released from prison, community music centers and therapeutic music programs. By March 2008, grants had been awarded to programs in 24 states. The list of programs the foundation supports is continually growing as they receive numerous grant applications every year.

Unfortunately, the Foundation is also forced to reject many of the applicants each year due to application discrepancies. Discrepancies include incorrectly completed applications, applicant programs that are not within the scope of the foundation's grants, or requests for items that GCMF does not award.

In February 2008 the foundation established a relationship with President Jimmy Carter and his organization, Carter Center. The Music Foundation will be providing musical instruments and memorabilia to the Carter Center auctions in return for publicity and the Carter Center's public support of the Guitar Center Music Foundation and the importance of music in people's lives.

== Fundraising ==
=== Memorabilia ===
The Fender Music Foundation relies solely on charitable donations from the public and funds raised through the selling of music memorabilia. Memorabilia sales are made online through the foundation's own e-store and marketed through fan sites. Items such as signed posters, guitars, songbooks and records are all sold to raise money for music programs. Artist memorabilia includes artists such as the Eagles, Black Label Society, Guns N' Roses, Ozzy Osbourne, Zakk Wylde, Kiss, New Found Glory, Lynyrd Skynyrd, Hank Williams Jr., John Mayer, James Blunt, the Beach Boys, Green Day, Elvis Costello, Carrie Underwood, Def Leppard, Iggy Pop, Fiona Apple, Alice in Chains, Pantera, Jimi Hendrix and his sister Janie Hendrix. These names are just a few of the artists who support the foundation with signed memorabilia items.

In early 2008 the foundation began a relationship with Auctionwire.com. This auction-based website will enable the foundation to auction off higher-end memorabilia and meet and greets with celebrities like Don Felder and Alan White.

=== Benefit events ===
Charity events also play a large role in the Foundation's fundraising efforts. The Fender Music Foundation has hosted a number of music benefits since its creation in 2005. In March 2006 the Music Foundation hosted "An Evening with Ray Kennedy and Friends". This event hosted by the foundation featured performances by Macy Gray, the Dave Mason Band, the Syn, California Transit Authority, the Los Angeles Guitar Quartet, Gia Ciambotti and celebrity band 16:9 which includes House's Hugh Laurie, Alias's and Felicity's Greg Grunberg, Desperate Housewives's James Denton, The Bachelor's Bob Guiney and many special guests. The event also included a silent auction featuring signed and rare memorabilia with all of the proceeds, including ticket sales, going toward music education programs.

FMF has also hosted events with master guitarist Pepe Romero and the New West Symphony.

FMF's most recent event was a benefit entitled "The Gift of Music". This event featured celebrity guests, an art exhibit by Paul Thatcher, music from Koffehouse recording artists, and a silent auction featuring memorabilia such as a Jimi Hendrix gift basket donated by Janie Hendrix. Celebrity guests included contestants John Boone and winner Maria Hartman from VH1's The Shot, protégé drummer Tony Royster, and drummer Danny Seraphine from the band Chicago. All proceeds from this event were used to benefit music programs across the country.

== Involvement with Music Rising ==
=== Music Rising ===
Music Rising was started by U2's the Edge in partnership with The Guitar Center Music Foundation and Gibson Guitar in order to raise funds to replace the lost instruments and accessories of the musicians affected by the hurricanes that devastated the Gulf Coast region in 2005. Exclusive guitars manufactured by Gibson were available exclusively through the Guitar Center website with all proceeds going towards the goals of Music Rising.
