= No Stairway =

Studio album by Glassine
- Released: April 17, 2015
- Studio: Guitar Center locations in Brooklyn and Baltimore
- Genre: Ambient; dub; new-age; experimental; vaporwave
- Length: 23:39
- Label: Patient Sounds
- Producer: Danny Greenwald

Glassine chronology
No Stairway (2015)	Looking Down (2015)

No Stairway is the debut studio album of Glassine, the musical project of Danny Greenwald, first released online and later issued on cassette worldwide by the label Patient Sounds, in April and August 2015, respectively. The title is a reference to a line from the 1992 film Wayne's World. The album garnered significant attention from music journalists for its compositional and production technique. In two Guitar Center stores, Greenwald tapped people playing instruments on his iPhone, and used snippets of these low-quality trackings as loops or synth patches, playing some of them through effects pedals or 4-track machines. The "dystopian" environment of Guitar Center shops and his desire to record something without a budget while in New York City is what inspired his idea to use samples of recordings of people playing instruments and build compositions out of them. On Fact's year-end list of best Bandcamp releases, No Stairway came in at number 19.

== Background ==
Raised in Columbia, Maryland, Greenwald first went to a Guitar Center store at age 14 to buy his first electric guitar. After that however, he rarely went to the former shop and instead bought equipment from local stores like Atomic Music in Beltsville, Maryland for most of his life. He disliked Guitar Center for its "dystopian" and "unpleasant" environment, which was one of the major parts of him being influenced to make No Stairway: "I wanted to take something unattractive and be able to extract beauty from it. I wanted to make that environment float on a cloud. I wanted to inspect little nuances, capture them, and paint with them." While living in New York City, there was a point where Greenwald became bankrupt and wanted to create great-sounding tracks with no budget whatsoever without the need of using samples from a digital audio workstation or other computer software. While waiting for the train one day, he went to a Guitar Center store near Atlantic Terminal out of boredom. At the store, he heard someone playing a Green Day song on an electric guitar and noticed the instrument's poor tone:

I remember thinking like, 'what if I could feed that through these weird reverb pedals I have at home?' 'Would it sound any different?' and it sort of hit me 'why don't I just record other people playing and then sort of use as my paint'.

== Production and composition ==
Greenwald first tried to take control of the sounds from the expensive synthesizers Guitar Center was selling by recording samples of them, but was unimpressed with the results. On a later visit to the shop, he recorded what would be the first sound to be featured on the album; he taped a guy who "was just going for it on a drum kit", lowering the speed of the sample of the drum recording he used. The singer described how he felt while editing the sample: "I started to hear some kind of solace in a place that is sonically hellish.” Greenwald started recording the album in a Guitar Center in Brooklyn, and then at a shop in Baltimore. Instead of looking to record instruments specifically planned for a song, Greenwald taped whatever sound he thought that could become better in quality when editing them later. Greenwald ended up with around 40 hours of iPhone recordings to work at his home. Some snippets were played through a 4-track tape recorder, others were old pedals and some were looped or used as synthesizer patches. These recordings were put together, EQ'd, mixed and mastered in Pro Tools. Much planning was put into how the recordings were edited together, as he tried to "connect things that were seemingly un-connectable." The result was an album that featured ambient, dub, new-age, experimental and post-vaporwave styles.

== Release and reception ==
No Stairway was first self-released on Bandcamp and Glassine's official SoundCloud page on April 17, 2015. In the same year, on August 6, record label Patient Sounds distributed the album on cassette. The title of the album is a reference to the line "No stairway, denied" from the 1992 comedy film Wayne's World. Live at Guitar Center, an album by Brooklyn musician Noah Wall that also used Guitar Center recordings, was released slightly before the Glassine album on April 6. When Greenwald and Patient Sounds accidentally found out about Wall's record, he almost didn't want to release No Stairway, feeling "gutted" someone had already made an album with an identical concept to his project. However, when the label made Wall aware of Greenwald's release, he was very excited about the album and his support got Greenwald motivated again to distribute his record. Greenwald has not sent No Stairway to Guitar Center despite suggestion to do so from his relatives.

A Tiny Mix Tapes journalist praised the album's style as "some post-vaporwave produced faux melodic ambiance that’s all at once subconscious music and next-level field recording. And the esoterica and nostalgic level of listening here is completely outta-whack when paired with the idea that NONE of these samples are realmed in the same genre or created (potentially) by the same person." Critic Jesse Locke featured it on his column for Aux "No Rest for the Obsessed", suggesting that listeners will want repeated hearings of Greenwald's album unlike Live at Guitar Center. Jayson Greene, scoring No Stairway a 7.2 out of ten in his review for Pitchfork, called the album along with Wall's record "slight redemptive" reminders of Guitar Center's commercial success during the 1990s pre-Internet period, which contrast with a current time where the chain of retailers may shut down quickly due to extreme financial decrease. He called Greenwald's editing of such low-quality sound recordings as "impressive and even a little bewildering, but the knowledge proves unnecessary." In May 2015, Fact magazine honored the record as one of their favorite Bandcamp releases for the month of April, and on their year-end list of "20 best Bandcamp releases", it was ranked number 19. In The Fader's "Top 2 Reasons Guitar Center Still Shreds", No Stairway was number two and Live at Guitar Center topped the list.

== Track listing ==
Length adapted from the following source:

No.	Title	Length
1.	"intro.vultures.refuge"	5:45
2.	"human shield"	4:06
3.	"an open window"	1:23
4.	"great star"	2:11
5.	"hornet with a halo"	2:42
6.	"sunruse bench"	4:46
7.	"parchment rise"	2:46
Total length:		23:39
