= Starrabba =

Starrabba is an Italian surname. Notable people with the surname include:

- Antonio Starabba, Marchese di Rudinì (1839–1908), Italian politician, 18th and 21st Prime Minister of Italy
- Gaetano Starrabba (born 1932), Italian racing driver
