= Marzamemi =

- Frazione
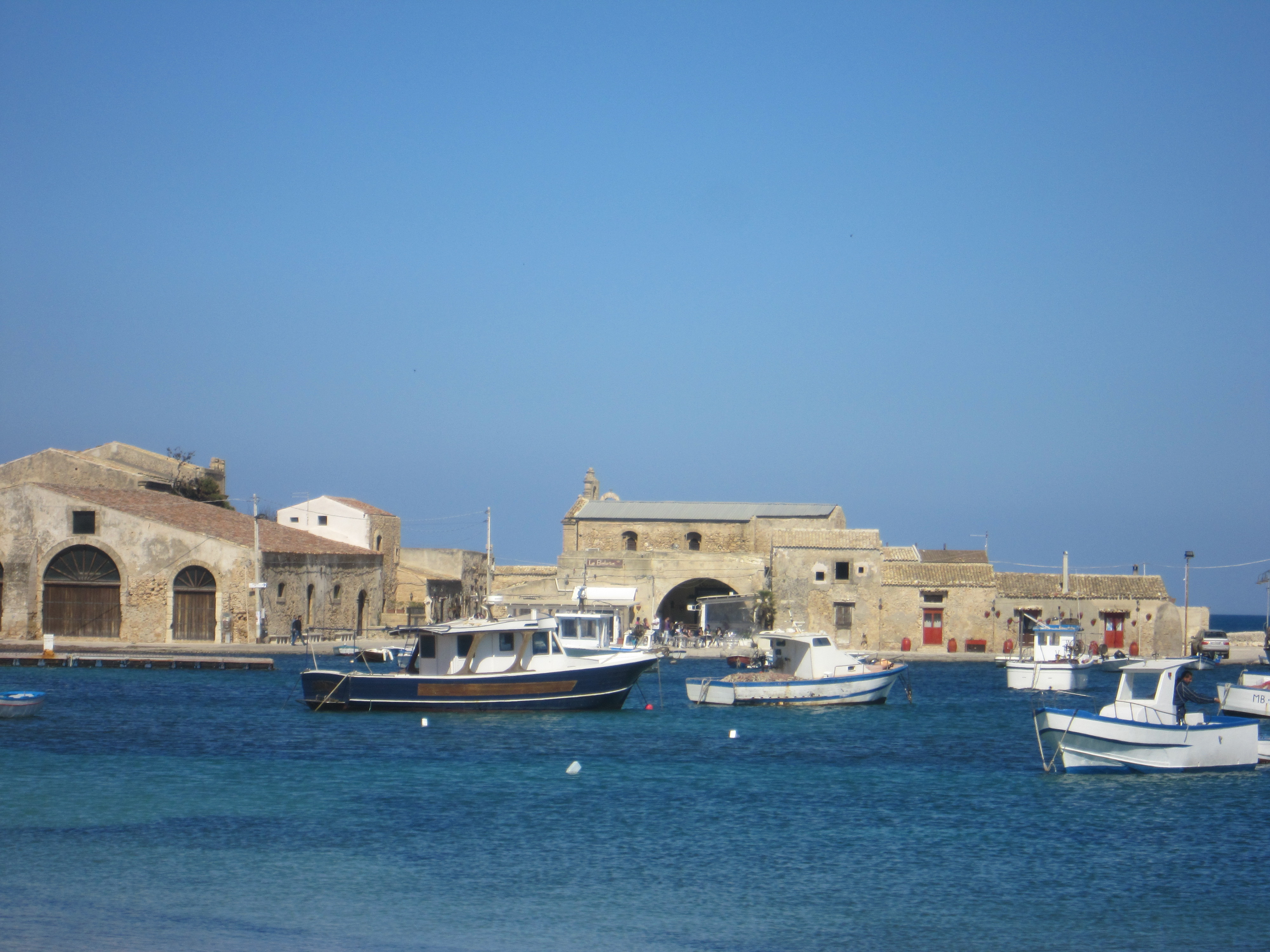
- Tonnara of Marzamemi

- Location of Marzamemi in Italy
- Coordinates: 36°44′15.4″N 15°6′57.37″E
- Country: Italy
- Region: Sicily
- Province: Syracuse (SR)
- Comune: Pachino
- Elevation: 2 m (6.6 ft)

Population (2011)
  - Total: 367
- Time zone: UTC+1 (CET)
  - Summer (DST): UTC+2 (CEST)
- Postal code: 96010
- Dialing code: (+39) 0931

Marzamemi is a southern Italian hamlet of Pachino and Noto, two municipalities part of the Province of Syracuse, Sicily.

Marzamemi is located by the Ionian Sea coast of the island of Sicily and is 3.97 kilometres (2.47 mi) from Pachino. It has a population of 367.

In 1959, a Byzantine merchant ship was found near Marzamemi. The vessel, which might date back to the 6th century during the reign of Justinian I, contained decorative elements of a church’s nave.

== Bibliography ==
- Sorbello, Salvatore (2010). La pesca del tonno nel capolinea del sud. Le tonnare di Vendicari, Marezamemi e Portopalo di Capo Passero (in Italian). Emanuele Romeo Editore. ISBN 9788874280933.
