= Robert Giardinelli =

Robert Giardinelli (January 23, 1914, in Catania, Italy – October 1, 1996, in New York City, New York) was a renowned musical instrument craftsman who operated a repair shop in New York City. After immigrating to the United States, Giardinelli served in the United States Army during World War II. In 1946, he opened his music shop in the Bronx, later moving to midtown Manhattan, where he operated for over 40 years until his retirement. His business encompassed mouthpiece manufacturing, a discount music store, and a custom repair shop for brass and wind instruments. Giardinelli's shop at 151 West 46th Street became a famous destination for musicians in the 1980s.

He completed his biography just three days before his death in 1996. Today, Jon Baltimore Music occupies the same location offering similar services and is the last remaining musical repair shop open to the public in the Times Square area since Sam Ash's departure in 2012.

Music & Arts, located online at musicarts.com, with over 200 music stores and 300 music store affiliates in the United States, purchased the rights to the Giardinelli product name in United States, and sells a small line of Giardinelli branded musical instruments and musical instrument care products.

On November 13, 2020, during the COVID-19 pandemic, Guitar Center announced that it planned to file for Chapter 11 bankruptcy protection after negotiating a debt-cutting deal with key investors and lenders. Guitar Center said it had received up to $165 million in new equity, and lenders agreed to reduce its debt by around $800 million. Guitar Center filed for bankruptcy on November 21, 2020. The company emerged from Chapter 11 bankruptcy on December 23, 2020, after a reorganization deal added additional equity and debt capital.
