= Music & Arts Center =

American musical instrument retailer

Music & Arts
- Type: Subsidiary
- Industry: Musical instruments
- Founded: 1952; 74 years ago in Bethesda, Maryland, United States
- Founder: Benjamin O'Brien
- Headquarters: Frederick, Maryland, United States
- Number of locations: 253
- Area served: United States
- Key people: Jeff Gottlieb, President
- Products: Musical instruments, sheet music
- Services: Musical instrument rentals and repairs, private music lessons
- Number of employees: 1,500 (2005)
- Parent: Guitar Center, Inc.
- Website: musicarts.com

Music & Arts is an American musical instrument retailer chain specializing in band and orchestra instrument sales and rentals, guitars, keyboards, sheet music and accessories, musical instrument repairs and private music lessons. It is the largest school music dealer in the United States, with 253 retail locations. Originally founded in 1952, the company has operated as a subsidiary of Guitar Center since its acquisition in 2005.

== History ==
The first Music & Arts Center was founded by Benjamin O'Brien in a small house in Bethesda, Maryland in 1952. That first store offered music lessons, music and art supplies, and dance lessons — thus the name Music & Arts. The company gradually expanded in Maryland and Virginia, later opening retail stores in Atlanta, the Philadelphia area, the Carolinas, Nashville, Denver, and the Northeastern United States. Music & Arts Center eventually became one of the largest chain of musical instrument retail stores serving school band and orchestra programs, with 62 stores throughout the Mid-Atlantic, Southeast, Northeast regions of the U.S. as well as Colorado. In 1998, the corporate headquarters moved from Rockville to Frederick, Maryland.

By 2005, Music & Arts Center was operating 60 retail locations and 7 educational support centers throughout the mid-Atlantic and Southeast. On February 9, 2005, Guitar Center announced the acquisition of Music & Arts Center and its plans to merge Music & Arts Center with its American Music Group division of band and orchestral instrument stores. The new company, operating as Music & Arts Center, included 82 retail music store locations spanning the United States, 1,500 employees, 330 affiliate dealers, and over 150,000 annual musical instrument rentals.

Music & Arts has become the largest school music dealer in the United States, with over 260 retail locations, over 200 educational representatives, and over 300 affiliate locations. The retailer has been characterized as the largest private music lesson program in the United States, as its employee private lesson teachers conduct over 1.5 million private music lessons with students each year.

On November 13, 2020, during the COVID-19 pandemic, Guitar Center announced that it planned to file for Chapter 11 bankruptcy protection after negotiating a debt-cutting deal with key investors and lenders. Guitar Center said it had received up to $165 million in new equity, and lenders agreed to reduce its debt by around $800 million. Guitar Center filed for bankruptcy on November 21, 2020. The company emerged from Chapter 11 bankruptcy on December 23, 2020, after a reorganization deal added additional equity and debt capital.

In 2024, Woodwind & Brasswind was rebranded as Music & Arts.
