= Music Rising =

Music Rising logo

Music Rising is a charity co-founded by producer Bob Ezrin, U2's The Edge and a host of music industry organizations after the devastation of Hurricane Katrina in 2005. The charitable organization helps to restore the livelihoods of musicians affected by disasters and funds efforts that support music education.

== Phase One ==
In early September 2006, Green Day collaborated with U2 in the studio to record a cover version of the song "The Saints Are Coming" by The Skids to benefit Music Rising. To coincide with the recording, both bands performed a live version of the song during the official reopening of the Louisiana Superdome (Music Rising ) and the NFL Monday Night Football Pregame show of the New Orleans Saints/Atlanta Falcons game on September 25, 2006. This game marked the first time that the New Orleans Saints returned to their home building, the Superdome, since the devastations of Hurricane Katrina and Hurricane Rita. "The Saints Are Coming" was digitally released on October 31 and the single on November 6, 2006.

In April 2006, Music Rising aided in the reopening of the historic Preservation Hall landmark in New Orleans. While the Jazz Hall survived the storm, it had lost all of its instruments, which were eventually replaced as part of Music Rising's initiatives. U2's The Edge performed with the Preservation Jazz Hall band as part of the official reopening (Music Rising) Additionally, Music Rising helped replace the precious Baldwin Piano that Fats Domino had lost when his house was destroyed during the hurricane.

== Phases Two and Three ==
Since beginning of Phase Two Music Rising restored instruments to thousands of individual musicians and dozens of schools and choirs in the Gulf Coast region. Phase Three was dedicated to supporting community musical and cultural organizations and events. In 2008, the foundation played a large part in ensuring that the expenses were covered for the Mardi Gras Indians, allowing them to afford to march.

Music Rising also provided a $1 million grant to Tulane University and created Music Rising Studies of the Gulf South curriculum major at the university. Additionally Music Rising helped restore the livelihoods of musicians suffering after the Nashville floods and schools in need of music education rescue after Hurricane Harvey and Hurricane Sandy. In December 2021, Music Rising will host the Guitar Icons: A Musical Instrument Auction to Benefit Music Rising event at Van Eaton Galleries in Los Angeles. The auction will feature an exclusive collection of guitars and instruments from some of the world's most popular artists and friends of Music Rising including Bono, Paul McCartney, Elton John, Chris Martin, Lenny Kravitz, Steve Miller, Paul Stanley, Alice Cooper, Slash, Alex Lifeson, Eddie Vedder and Pearl Jam and many others. The auction will be live onsite and online via Van Eaton Galleries and all proceeds will benefit Music Rising. To find out more about Music Rising the new website is www.musicrising.com

Music Rising is the recipient of the HALO Award for Cause Marketing, The Billboard Humanitarian Award, The PRISM Award and the Jazz Foundation of America Medal of Honor.

== Documentary ==
Music Rising was the subject of a feature documentary directed by Canadian Don Young and produced by Frantic Films of Winnipeg, Canada. It was the highest-rated documentary in Canada during September 2006. The film told the story of U2's efforts to raise money for the Music Rising charity. Contributing to Don Young's film were musicians The Edge, Dave Matthews, Dr. John, Willie Nelson, Arlo Guthrie, Wolfman Washington, Breeze Cayolle, Bruce Springsteen, and Bob Dylan. The broadcast of this documentary was delayed when the marketing division of U2 Inc. demanded changes which resulted in a considerable amount of world exclusive U2 scenes being removed from the film at the last moment. The missing scenes featured The Edge visiting some of the hardest-hit sections of New Orleans where he met with residents, jammed with street rappers, prayed with local pastors, and was deeply moved by what he saw. Under considerable pressure to change the film Young resigned but eventually re-joined the project to protect the final cut. The rare and valuable U2 footage has never been broadcast. In 2007 "Music Rising" won two television academy 'Accolade Awards' and was broadcast in 27 countries, including the United States, where it aired on both VH1 and the Sundance Channel.
