= Wolfgang Tonne =

German World War II fighter pilot (1918–1943)

- Tonne as an Oberleutnant
- Born: 28 February 1918; Moosbach in Schleiz, Thuringia
- Died: 20 April 1943 (aged 25); Protville in Tunisia
- Burial place: German Military Cemetery at Bordj-Cedria
- Military career
- Allegiance: Nazi Germany
- Branch: Luftwaffe
- Service years: 1937–1943
- Rank: Major (major)
- Unit: JG 53
- Commands: 3./JG 53
- Conflicts: See battles World War II: Battle of France; Battle of Britain; Operation Barbarossa; Eastern Front; Mediterranean Theatre; North African campaign
- Awards: Knight's Cross of the Iron Cross with Oak Leaves

Wolfgang Tonne (28 February 1918 – 20 April 1943) was a German Luftwaffe military aviator and fighter ace during World War II. He is credited with 122 aerial victories—that is, 122 aerial combat encounters resulting in the destruction of the enemy aircraft—achieved in 641 combat missions. This figure includes 96 aerial victories on the Eastern Front, and further 26 victories over the Western Allies, including one four-engined bomber.

Born in Moßbach, Tonne grew up in the Weimar Republic and Nazi Germany. He joined the military service in the Luftwaffe in 1937. Following flight training, he was posted to Jagdgeschwader 53 (JG 53—53rd Fighter Wing) in 1939. Flying with this wing, Tonne claimed his first aerial victory on 14 May 1940 on the Western Front during the Battle of France. He then fought in the Battle of Britain and Operation Barbarossa, the German invasion of the Soviet Union. In late 1941, his unit was sent to Mediterranean theater. There, he was made Staffelkapitän (squadron leader) of 3. Staffel (3rd squadron) of JG 53 in January 1942. In May 1942, his unit was posted to the Eastern Front were following his 101st aerial victory he was awarded the Knight's Cross of the Iron Cross with Oak Leaves on 24 September 1942. His unit was then ordered to North Africa in October 1942. Tonne was killed in a flying accident on 20 April 1943 at Protville, Tunisia.

== Early life and career ==
Tonne was born on 28 February 1918 in Moßbach, near Schleiz, in Thuringia of the German Empire. His father was a one-room school teacher (Dorfschullehrer). Tonne had a brother who got him interested in flying glider aircraft. In November 1937, Tonne joined the Luftwaffe as an office cadet at the Luftkriegsschule 4 (LKS 4—4th Air War School) near Fürstenfeldbruck. He completed his A/B pilot license, (Note: Flight training in the Luftwaffe progressed through the levels A1, A2 and B1, B2, referred to as A/B flight training. A training included theoretical and practical training in aerobatics, navigation, long-distance flights and dead-stick landings. The B courses included high-altitude flights, instrument flights, night landings and training to handle the aircraft in difficult situations.) and was promoted to Leutnant (second lieutenant) on 1 September 1939.

== World War II ==
World War II in Europe began on Friday 1 September 1939 when German forces invaded Poland. On 6 December 1939, Tonne was posted to 3. Staffel (3rd Squadron) of Jagdgeschwader 53 (JG 53—53rd Fighter Wing). At the time, the Staffel was commanded by Oberleutnant Wolfgang Lippert and was subordinated to I. Gruppe (1st Group) of JG 53 headed by Hauptmann Lothar von Janson which was based at Darmstadt-Griesheim Airfield. Tonne received the Iron Cross 2nd Class (Eisernes Kreuz 2. Klasse) on 18 April 1940. Tonne claimed his first aerial victory over a Royal Air Force (RAF) Bristol Blenheim twin-engined bomber over Sedan from either No. 21, No. 107 or No. 110 Squadron on 14 May 1940 during the Battle of France. On that mission, he was also shot down near Bouillon in combat with Hawker Hurricane fighters. He bailed out of his Messerschmitt Bf 109 E-3 landing in enemy territory but was able to return to his unit uninjured.

Over England and the Channel he was to gain a further three victories by the spring of 1941. I. Gruppe left the English Channel front on 6 June 1941, relocating to Mannheim-Sandhofen Airfield. Following a maintenance overhaul of the aircraft, I. Gruppe moved to an airfield named Krzewicza located near Międzyrzec Podlaski, approximately 65 kilometers (40 miles) west of Brest, from 12 to 14 June.

=== Operation Barbarossa and Malta ===
On 22 June, the Geschwader crossed into Soviet airspace in support of Operation Barbarossa, the invasion of the Soviet Union, which opened the Eastern Front. I. Gruppe took off on its first mission at 3:40 am, escorting Junkers Ju 87 dive bombers. On 24 June 1941, Tonne who had been appointed adjutant in I. Gruppe of JG 53, claimed his first aerial victory when he shot down a Tupolev SB bomber. On 5 July, I. Gruppe moved to an airfield at Dubno. On 11 July, Tonne was wounded in aerial combat when a shell casing entered the cockpit of his Bf 109 F-2 (Werknummer 6728—factory number), hitting him in the face. Following the injury, he crash landed his aircraft near Berdychiv. On 1 October 1941, Tonne was promoted to Oberleutnant (first lieutenant). Flying combat air patrol the next day, Tonne claimed two aerial victories.

In August 1941, I. Gruppe was withdrawn from the Eastern Front and were equipped with the Bf 109 F-4 at Mannheim-Sandhofen Airfield. On 20 September, the Gruppe relocated to the Netherlands where they were based at airfields at Katwijk and Haamstede where they were tasked with patrolling the Dutch airspace. In December 1941, I. Gruppe was moved to Mediterranean air bases at Gela in Sicily where they fought in the aerial battles of the Siege of Malta. On 24 January 1942, Tonne was appointed Staffelkapitän (squadron leader) of 3. Staffel of JG 53. He succeeded Oberleutnant Ulrich Wollschläger. Tonne flew 116 combat missions over Malta, without claiming aerial victories. On 29 April, I. Gruppe flew its last mission over Malta before returning to Germany. In early May, the Gruppe transferred to Schwäbisch Hall for preparations to redeploy on the Eastern Front.

=== Eastern Front ===
In early May 1942, I. Gruppe was transferred back to the Eastern Front. Prior to the relocation, the Gruppe received a full complement of 41 factory new Bf 109 F-4 aircraft at Schwäbisch Hall before heading for Prague Ruzyne Airfield on 28 May. The following day, I. Gruppe flew to Kursk. There, the Gruppe supported the German 4th Panzer Army in its advance towards Voronezh during Case Blue, the 1942 strategic summer offensive in southern Russia between 28 June and 24 November 1942.

From 31 May 1942 to 29 September 1942, Tonne flew 155 combat missions and shot down 88 aircraft on the Eastern Front. He received the German Cross in Gold (Deutsches Kreuz in Gold) on 21 August. Tonne was awarded the Knight's Cross of the Iron Cross (Ritterkreuz des Eisernen Kreuzes) on 6 September 1942 following his 54th aerial victory. The Knight's Cross of the Iron Cross with Oak Leaves (Ritterkreuz des Eisernen Kreuzes mit Eichenlaub) were awarded on 24 September for 101 victories. The presentation was made by Adolf Hitler in October at the Führerhauptquartier Werwolf, Hitler's headquarters located in a pine forest about 12 kilometres (7.5 mi) north of Vinnytsia, in Ukraine. Three other Luftwaffe officers were presented with the Oak Leaves that day by Hitler, Oberleutnant Friedrich-Karl Müller, Leutant Hans Beißwenger and Feldwebel Wilhelm Crinius. Following the presentation, Tonne, Müller and Crinius were ordered to Berlin where they made a propaganda appearance at the "House of the Press". At the same time, I. Gruppe of JG 53 relocated from the Eastern Front to Comiso Airfiled in Sicily where they arrived on 10 October.

=== North Africa and death ===
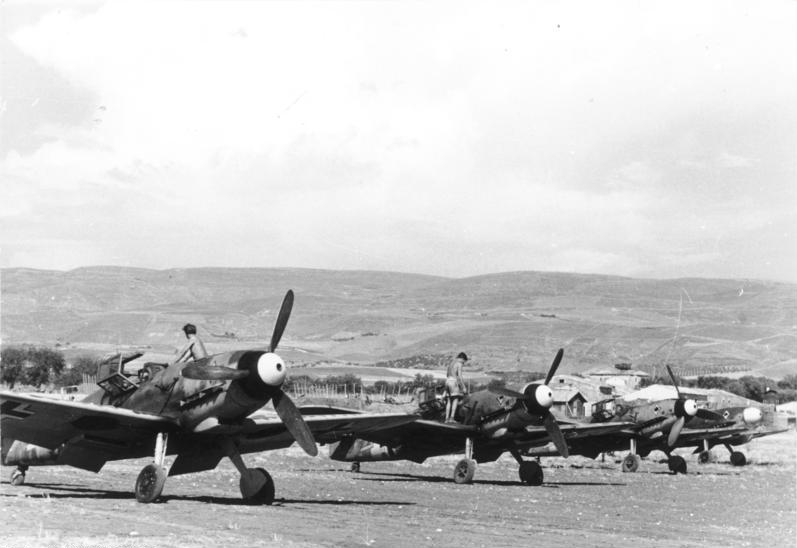
Bf 109s of JG 53, similar to those flown by Tonne.

When British forces launched the Second Battle of El Alamein on 23 October, elements of I. Gruppe of JG 53 were ordered to North Africa. He claimed his first victory in this theater on 26 December 1942 shooting down a United States Army Air Forces (USAAF) P-38 Lightning twin-engine fighter. On 28 December leading a flight of six Bf 109 to the Souk-el-Arba Airfield, Tonne shot down a Supermarine Spitfire fighter near the airfield. On 1 January 1943, I. Gruppe flew many missions to Bône harbor, escorting Ju 87 dive bombers. That day, Tonne claimed two Spitfire fighters shot down. The next day, I. Gruppe again escorted Ju 87 dive bombers from II. Gruppe Sturzkampfgeschwader 3 (StG 3—3rd Dive Bomber Wing) and Focke-Wulf Fw 190 ground attack aircraft from III. Gruppe of Zerstörergeschwader 2 (ZG 2—2nd Destroyer Wing) to Bône. During this mission, Tonne claimed a Spitfire fighter shot down.

Tonne flew 82 combat missions and claimed 21 victories over Tunisia. On 6 March, Tonne was credited with shooting down the RAF No. 93 Squadron Spitfire fighter piloted by Sergeant W.F. Hockey. On 2 April, I. Gruppe moved to an airfield at Protville located approximately 12 kilometers (7.5 miles) northwest of Raoued and 5 kilometers (3.1 miles) southwest of Kalâat el-Andalous.

On 20 April 1943, Tonne claimed his 122nd aerial victory. Returning from that mission, he was killed in a flying accident over the airfield at Protville in his Bf 109 G-6 /R1 (Werknummer 16523). Tonne had waggled his wings to signal an aerial victory claimed. He then pulled his Bf 109 into a steep climb, while turning the aircraft, extending the undercarriage, and sideslipping the excess altitude before touching down. He had executed this risky maneuver many times before but apparently had misjudged his height and crashed at the edge of the airfield. Tonne was posthumously promoted to Major (major). He was temporarily succeeded by Leutnant Rupert Weninger before Oberleutnant Walter Seiz took command of 3. Staffel.

== Summary of career ==
=== Aerial victory claims ===
According to US historian David T. Zabecki, Tonne was credited with 122 aerial victories. Spick also lists him with 122 aerial victories claimed in 641 combat missions, of which 5 victories were claimed during the Battle of France and Britain, 96 on the Eastern Front and 21 over North Africa. Mathews and Foreman, authors of Luftwaffe Aces — Biographies and Victory Claims, researched the German Federal Archives and found records for 120 aerial victory claims, plus six further unconfirmed claims. This figure of confirmed claims includes 95 aerial victories on the Eastern Front and 25 on the Western Front.

Victory claims were logged to a map-reference (PQ = Planquadrat), for example "PQ 49293". The Luftwaffe grid map (Jägermeldenetz) covered all of Europe, western Russia and North Africa and was composed of rectangles measuring 15 minutes of latitude by 30 minutes of longitude, an area of about 360 square miles (930 km^{2}). These sectors were then subdivided into 36 smaller units to give a location area 3 km × 4 km (1.9 mi × 2.5 mi) in size.

Chronicle of aerial victories
This and the – (dash) indicates unconfirmed aerial victory claims for which Tonne did not receive credit. This and the ? (question mark) indicates information discrepancies listed by Prien, Stemmer, Rodeike, Bock, Mathews and Foreman.
Claim	Date	Time	Type	Location	Claim	Date	Time	Type	Location
– 3. Staffel of Jagdgeschwader 53 – Battle of France — 10 May – 25 June 1940
1	14 May 1940	19:40	Blenheim	northwest of Sedan	2	9 June 1940	14:40	Hawk 36	Saint-Dizier
– 3. Staffel of Jagdgeschwader 53 – Action at the Channel and over England — 26 June 1940 – 7 June 1941
3	15 September 1940	15:55	Hurricane		5	26 April 1941	10:30	Spitfire	south of Boulogne-sur-Mer
4	17 October 1940	16:37	Spitfire	southeast of London					
– Stab I. Gruppe of Jagdgeschwader 53 – Operation Barbarossa — 22 June – 7 August 1941
6	24 June 1941	09:40	SB-2		10	7 July 1941	09:08	DB-3	south of Ploskirov
7	24 June 1941	09:45	SB-2	north of Pruzhany	11	11 July 1941	13:40? (Note: According to Mathews and Foreman claimed at 12:40.)	DB-3	
8	6 July 1941	17:30	DB-3	Tarnopol	12	12 July 1941	10:40	I-153? (Note: According to Mathews and Foreman claimed as a Curtiss P-40 Warhawk.)	
9	6 July 1941	17:36	DB-3	Tarnopol	13	18 July 1941	12:08	SB-3	
– 3. Staffel of Jagdgeschwader 53 – Eastern Front — 28 May – 27 September 1942
14	31 May 1942	03:45	I-61 (MiG-3)	northeast of Kursk	58	18 August 1942	08:55	MiG-3	PQ 49293; 35 km (22 mi) east of Stalingrad
15	31 May 1942	03:48	I-61 (MiG-3)		59	19 August 1942	04:21	R-5	PQ 4084; 30 km (19 mi) north-northeast of Stalingrad
16	31 May 1942	03:55	I-61 (MiG-3)		60	19 August 1942	10:55	LaGG-3	PQ 4923; 35 km (22 mi) east-northeast of Stalingrad
17	5 June 1942	12:28	I-61 (MiG-3)		61	21 August 1942	17:35	I-180 (Yak-7)	PQ 4945; 30 km (19 mi) southeast of Stalingrad
18	5 June 1942	12:34	I-61 (MiG-3)		62	22 August 1942	10:15	LaGG-3	PQ 4913; 10 km (6.2 mi) north of Grebenka
19	9 June 1942	17:09	I-61 (MiG-3)		63	23 August 1942	16:05	MiG-3	PQ 49124; 15 km (9.3 mi) north of Gumrak
20	23 June 1942	15:00	R-5		64	24 August 1942	06:12	MiG-3	PQ 5914; 45 km (28 mi) east-northeast of Stalingrad
21	23 June 1942	15:05	R-5		65	3 September 1942	05:01? (Note: According to Mathews and Foreman claimed as at 05:56.)	MiG-3	PQ 49244; 10 km (6.2 mi) northeast of Stalingrad
22	28 June 1942	18:30? (Note: According to Mathews and Foreman claimed at 18:28.)	R-10 (Seversky)		66	3 September 1942	15:52	Yak-1	PQ 5089
23	28 June 1942	18:32	R-10 (Seversky)	east of Schatowa	67	4 September 1942	07:50? (Note: According to Mathews and Foreman claimed as at 07:40.)	LaGG-3	PQ 4019; 45 km (28 mi) north of Grebenka
24	2 July 1942	12:45	Pe-2		68	5 September 1942	10:05	Yak-1	PQ 49360; 15 km (9.3 mi) south of Stalingrad
25	5 July 1942	13:20	Boston	30 km (19 mi) east-northeast of Voronezh	69	5 September 1942	15:45	LaGG-3	PQ 4933; Stalingrad
26	5 July 1942	18:50	Pe-2	10 km (6.2 mi) northeast of Voronezh	70? (Note: This claim is not listed by Mathews and Foreman.)	6 September 1942	13:55	Il-2	PQ 4913
27	6 July 1942	07:40	LaGG-3	10 km (6.2 mi) east of Gnilowody	71	7 September 1942	16:57	Yak-1	PQ 4929; 40 km (25 mi) east of Stalingrad
28	6 July 1942	17:23? (Note: According to Mathews and Foreman claimed at 17:25.)	LaGG-3		72	8 September 1942	10:16? (Note: According to Mathews and Foreman claimed as at 10:19.)	Yak-1	PQ 49142
29	6 July 1942	17:32	LaGG-3		73	8 September 1942	10:25	Yak-1	PQ 4087; 20 km (12 mi) north-northeast of Stalingrad
30	7 July 1942	18:15	LaGG-3		74	8 September 1942	10:30	Yak-1	PQ 5054; 75 km (47 mi) northeast of Grebenka
31	8 July 1942	07:15	MiG-3		75	8 September 1942	10:45	Yak-1	PQ 4085; 35 km (22 mi) north-northeast of Stalingrad
32	11 July 1942	09:57	Boston		76	9 September 1942	10:43? (Note: According to Mathews and Foreman claimed as at 10:41.)	Yak-1	PQ 4076; 25 km (16 mi) north of Grebenka
33	11 July 1942	09:59	Boston		77	9 September 1942	10:49	Yak-1	PQ 4059; 45 km (28 mi) north of Grebenka
34	26 July 1942	04:25	LaGG-3		78	11 September 1942	11:30	La-5	PQ 4922; 25 km (16 mi) east-northeast of Stalingrad
35	26 July 1942	12:35? (Note: According to Mathews and Foreman claimed at 10:35.)	Pe-2		79	12 September 1942	16:53	Pe-2	PQ 4941; 15 km (9.3 mi) southeast of Stalingrad
36	31 July 1942	11:40	Il-2	PQ 3915; 25 km (16 mi) northwest of Kalach	80	13 September 1942	07:12? (Note: According to Mathews and Foreman claimed as at 07:00.)	La-5	PQ 49282; 25 km (16 mi) east of Stalingrad
37	31 July 1942	13:55	Il-2	PQ 39163; 15 km (9.3 mi) north-northwest of Kalach	81	13 September 1942	07:28? (Note: According to Mathews and Foreman claimed as at 07:38.)	LaGG-3	PQ 49122; 15 km (9.3 mi) north of Gumrak
38	31 July 1942	14:15	MiG-3	PQ 3919 vicinity of Kalach	82	13 September 1942	15:45	LaGG-3	PQ 4933 vicinity of Stalingrad
39	31 July 1942	17:00	Hurricane	PQ 3927 vicinity of Kalach	83	14 September 1942	04:45	Il-2	PQ 49413; 10 km (6.2 mi) east of Stalingrad
40	1 August 1942	14:19	LaGG-3	PQ 3926; 10 km (6.2 mi) north of Pitomnik	84	14 September 1942	16:40	Il-2	PQ 49452; 10 km (6.2 mi) east of Stalingrad
41	2 August 1942	12:25	Il-2	PQ 3919 vicinity of Kalach	85	16 September 1942	16:48	Yak-1	PQ 5055
42	2 August 1942	12:35	Il-2	PQ 3948; 35 km (22 mi) southeast of Kalach	86	17 September 1942	06:29	Pe-2	PQ 49111; 20 km (12 mi) north-northeast of Pitomnik
43	5 August 1942	07:10	MiG-3? (Note: According to Mathews and Foreman claimed as a Lavochkin-Gorbunov-Gudkov LaGG-3.)	PQ 49742; 15 km (9.3 mi) east-northeast of Aksay	87	17 September 1942	09:47	Yak-1	PQ 4076; 25 km (16 mi) north of Grebenka
44	5 August 1942	07:17	MiG-3	PQ 49751; 25 km (16 mi) east-northeast of Aksay	88	18 September 1942	10:07	Yak-1	PQ 4059; 45 km (28 mi) north of Grebenka
45	5 August 1942	11:29	MiG-3	PQ 49783 vicinity of Shutow	89	18 September 1942	16:53	Yak-1	PQ 40750; 30 km (19 mi) north of Gumrak
46	5 August 1942	17:10	MiG-3	PQ 49582; 35 km (22 mi) east-northeast of Aksay	90	18 September 1942	17:02? (Note: According to Mathews and Foreman claimed as at 17:12.)	Yak-1	PQ 4073; 35 km (22 mi) north of Grebenka
47	6 August 1942	06:23	MiG-3	PQ 39891 vicinity of Aksay	91	19 September 1942	09:28	Yak-1	PQ 49124; 15 km (9.3 mi) north of Gumrak
48	6 August 1942	06:30	MiG-3	PQ 39891 vicinity of Aksay	92	19 September 1942	09:40	Yak-1	PQ 4039; 15 km (9.3 mi) north of Grebenka
49	6 August 1942	16:00	R-5	PQ 49321; 5 km (3.1 mi) south of Bassargino	93	20 September 1942	06:53	Yak-1	PQ 49133; 10 km (6.2 mi) north of Grebenka
50	8 August 1942	05:35	MiG-3	PQ 49512; 35 km (22 mi) south-southwest of Bassargino	94	20 September 1942	07:13	Yak-1	PQ 49422; 25 km (16 mi) east of Stalingrad
51	8 August 1942	06:02	Il-2	PQ 4956; 45 km (28 mi) south of Stalingrad	95	20 September 1942	10:07	Yak-1	PQ 49294; 35 km (22 mi) east of Stalingrad
52	8 August 1942	17:04	LaGG-3	PQ 49611; 35 km (22 mi) south-southeast of Stalingrad	96	21 September 1942	14:57	Yak-1	PQ 49431; 35 km (22 mi) east of Stalingrad
53	9 August 1942	07:04	MiG-3	PQ 4952; 35 km (22 mi) south-southwest of Stalingrad	97	21 September 1942	15:12	Yak-1	PQ 49433; 35 km (22 mi) east of Stalingrad
54	10 August 1942	17:20	LaGG-3	PQ 39670; 20 km (12 mi) northwest of Shutow	98	21 September 1942	17:20	Yak-1	PQ 4079; 15 km (9.3 mi) north of Grebenka
55	12 August 1942	04:23	Il-2	PQ 38114; 15 km (9.3 mi) west of Shutow	99	22 September 1942	06:46? (Note: According to Mathews and Foreman claimed as at 06:49.)	Yak-1	PQ 49132; 10 km (6.2 mi) north of Grebenka
56	12 August 1942	04:33	MiG-3	PQ 39461; 25 km (16 mi) southwest of Bassargino	100	22 September 1942	16:29	Yak-1	PQ 49422; 25 km (16 mi) east of Stalingrad
57	15 August 1942	11:40	LaGG-3	PQ 4943; 40 km (25 mi) east-southeast of Stalingrad	101	22 September 1942	16:38	Yak-1	PQ 49262; 35 km (22 mi) east of Stalingrad
– 3. Staffel of Jagdgeschwader 53 – Mediterranean Theater — 1 October – 20 April 1943
—	26 December 1942	—	P-38		112	1 March 1943	17:45	Spitfire	west of Béja
102	28 December 1942	14:05	Spitfire	5 km (3.1 mi) south of Souk El Arbaa	113	3 March 1943	16:05	P-38	6 km (3.7 mi) south of Majaz al Bab
103	1 January 1943	11:08	Spitfire	5 km (3.1 mi) south of Bône	114	6 March 1943	17:44	Spitfire	3 km (1.9 mi) south of Pont du Fahs
104	1 January 1943	15:51	Spitfire	2 km (1.2 mi) southwest of Bône	115	22 March 1943	13:41	P-38	20 km (12 mi) north of Bizerte
105	2 January 1943	09:14	Spitfire	15 km (9.3 mi) northwest of La Calle	116	31 March 1943	15:51	Spitfire	10 km (6.2 mi) southwest of Abiod
106	15 January 1943	07:57	M.S.406 (Note: Misidentified Curtiss P-40 Warhawk, claimed as a Morane-Saulnier M.S.406)	8 km (5.0 mi) northeast of Tébessa	117	10 April 1943	16:50	Spitfire	5 km (3.1 mi) north of Oued Zarga
107	15 January 1943	08:16	P-40	11 km (6.8 mi) northeast of Tébessa	118	10 April 1943	17:00	Spitfire	south Béja
108	15 January 1943	11:08	P-40	airfield Thélepte	119	13 April 1943	07:00	Spitfire	15 km (9.3 mi) northeast of Oued Zarga
109	18 January 1943	16:32	Spitfire	southwest of Bou Arada	120	20 April 1943	10:04	Spitfire	airfield Tunis E-21
110? (Note: This claim is not listed by Mathews and Foreman.)	29 January 1943	11:05	B-17	6 km (3.7 mi) west of Béja	121	20 April 1943	10:11	Spitfire	8 km (5.0 mi) north of Tebourba
111	25 February 1943	16:40	Spitfire	4 km (2.5 mi) northwest of Cap Rosa	122	20 April 1943	16:58	Spitfire	25 km (16 mi) southwest of airfield 76

=== Awards ===
- Iron Cross (1939)
  - 2nd Class (18 April 1940)
  - 1st Class (23 May 1940)
- Front Flying Clasp of the Luftwaffe for fighter pilots in Gold (5 May 1941)
- Honour Goblet of the Luftwaffe (6 August 1941)
- German Cross in Gold on 21 August 1942 as Oberleutnant in the I./Jagdgeschwader 53
- Knight's Cross of the Iron Cross with Oak Leaves
  - Knight's Cross on 6 September 1942 as Oberleutnant and Staffelkapitän of the 3./Jagdgeschwader 53
  - 128th Oak Leaves on 24 September 1942 as Oberleutnant and Staffelkapitän of the 3./Jagdgeschwader 53
