= Bernd Venohr =

German management consultant, entrepreneur and author

- Born: April 16, 1959 (age 66); Hanau, Germany
- Occupations: Management consultant, entrepreneur and author
- Known for: Editor of the "Lexikon der deutschen Weltmarktführer" (Encyclopedia of German world-market leaders)

Bernd Venohr (born April 16, 1959 in Hanau, Germany) is a German management consultant, entrepreneur and author. He is the editor of the "Lexikon der deutschen Weltmarktführer" (Encyclopedia of German world-market leaders) about the German Mittelstand companies. Between 2006 and 2008 he was a tenured full Professor of strategic management at the Berlin School of Economics and Law. Before taking up this academic position he spent about 20 years in industry as managing director at Accenture and senior partner and member of the worldwide board of directors at Bain & Company. Venohr studied business administration at the Goethe University Frankfurt, where he also took his Ph.D. degree. In addition, he holds a Master of Business Administration degree (MBA) from Northwestern University, Chicago. He is married with two children and lives in Munich.

== Bibliography ==
- Florian Langenscheidt, Bernd Venohr (Ed.): Heilbronn-Franken. Region der Weltmarktführer: Rund 100 Weltmarktführer einer der erfolgreichsten Regionen Deutschlands. Deutsche Standards Editionen, Köln 2011, ISBN 978-3-86936-222-9. Portrayal of about 100 world-market leaders in the area of Heilbronn-Franken, Germany.
- Florian Langenscheidt, Bernd Venohr (Ed.): Lexikon der deutschen Weltmarktführer (vollständig überarbeitete Neuauflage). Deutsche Standards Editionen, Köln 2014, ISBN 978-3-86936-656-2. Encyclopedia of German world-market leaders.
- Florian Langenscheidt, Bernd Venohr (Ed.): Lexikon der deutschen Weltmarktführer. Die Königsklasse deutscher Unternehmen in Wort und Bild. Deutsche Standards Editionen, Köln 2010, ISBN 978-3-86936-221-2. Encyclopedia of German world-market leaders.
- Florian Langenscheidt, Bernd Venohr (Ed.): The Best of German Mittelstand - THE WORLD MARKET LEADERS. DAAB Verlag, Cologne 2015, ISBN 978-3-942597-48-7.
- Bernd Venohr: Wachsen wie Würth: Das Geheimnis des Welterfolgs. Campus Verlag, Frankfurt a.M. 2006, ISBN 978-3-593-37962-3. Best practise analysis of The Würth Group.
- Bernd Venohr: Marktgesetze und strategische Unternehmensführung. Eine kritische Analyse des PIMS- Programms. Gabler, Wiesbaden 1988, ISBN 978-3-409-13336-4.
