= Hartmut Abendschein =

German-Swiss writer

Hartmut Abendschein (Schwäbisch Hall, 7 October 1969) is a German – Swiss writer.

== Biography ==
Hartmut Abendschein attended German studies and English studies in Stuttgart, Constance and Glasgow. He lives in Bern since 2003 where he has a blog called taberna kritika – kleine formen.

== Works ==
- Notula Nova – Theorie & Praxis (Auswahl). In: Idiome Nr. 4. Klever, Wien 2011.
- The Chomskytree-Haiku (Rhizome(Rhizome)) / TCT-H (R(R)). Eine intermediale Allegorie poetischen Arbeitens. online installation, Bern 2011.
- Ueberich I. Datenbank der Realfiktionen / Database of real fiction 1(2)/2009. Video (60 min.), Bern 2011.
- Franz Kafka – Kleine Formen; gesammelt und gelesen von Fritz Michel und Hartmut Abendschein. edition taberna kritika, Bern 2010, ISBN 978-3-905846-10-2.
- Bibliotheca Caelestis. Tiddlywikiroman. edition taberna kritika, Bern 2008
- Die Träume meiner Frau. Hybride Stoffe. Athena Verlag, Oberhausen 2007
- die horizontlüge. gedichte & kleine prosa. edition taberna kritika, Bern 2007
- Franz Dodel/Hartmut Abendschein (Ed.): Wissen und Gewissen, eine literarische Anthologie. Stämpfli, Bern 2005, ISBN 3-7272-1297-7.
