= Frank Sayers =

Frank Sayers (1763–1817) was an English poet and metaphysical writer.

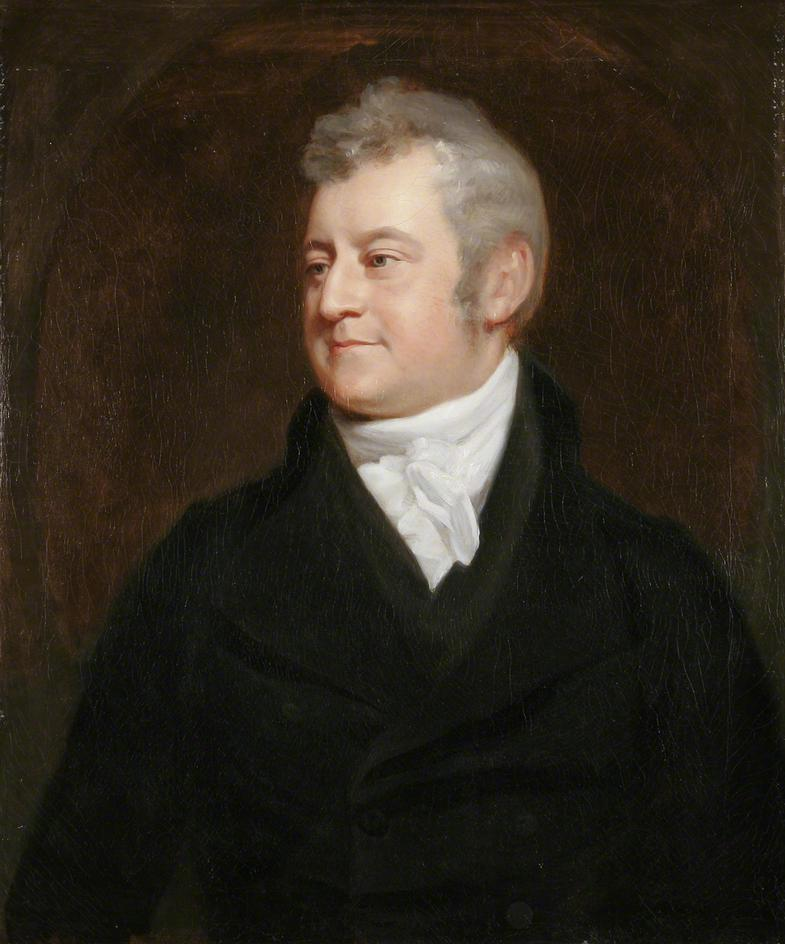
Frank Sayers, portrait by John Opie.

== Life ==
Born in London on 3 March 1763, being baptised at St Margaret Pattens on 3 April, he was son of Francis Sayers, an insurance broker, by his wife Anne, daughter of John Morris of Great Yarmouth. His father died within a year, and he went with his mother to her father's house in Friar's Lane, Yarmouth. At the age of ten he was sent to a boarding-school at North Walsham, where Horatio Nelson was his schoolfellow. A year later he was transferred to a school at Palgrave, Suffolk, a dissenting academy kept by Rochemont Barbauld and Anna Barbauld. There he for remained three years, and met his lifelong friend William Taylor.

In October 1778 his mother's father died, leaving him a small estate, and he went to learn farming at Oulton. Subsequently he attended John Hunter's surgery lectures in London, where he saw much of his cousin James Sayers, the caricaturist. For two years from the autumn of 1786 he pursued medical and scientific study at Edinburgh. In poor health, he visited the Lake District in June 1788, and later in the year he went abroad. After graduating M.D. from the University of Harderwyk, he returned to Norwich at the end of 1789, giving up medicine and starting to write.

In 1792, on his mother's death, Sayers moved to the Close at Norwich, and joined Norwich literary society. Among his friends and guests at various times were Robert Southey, Sir James Mackintosh, Thomas Fanshawe Middleton, and Thomas Amyot. The death of an aunt in 1799 increased his fortune.

He died at Norwich on 16 August 1817. A mural monument was erected to his memory in Norwich Cathedral by his heir, James Sayers. Sayers left benefactions to local institutions, and bequeathed his library to the dean and chapter. His portrait, by John Opie (1800), hung in William Taylor's library, and passed to Amyot.

== Work ==
From Thomas Gray's versions of the Runic poems and Thomas Percy's Northern Antiquities, Sayers derived his Dramatic Sketches of Northern Mythology, which he issued in 1790. The volume consisted of three tragedies, Moina, Starno, and The Descent of Frea; Jann Ewald's Danish tragedy The Death of Balder, on which the last piece is based, was subsequently translated by George Borrow. In 1792 a reissue of the volume included an Ode to Aurora, and a monodrama, Pandora. A third edition is dated 1803, and the last in 1807. Two German translations appeared, one in blank verse by Friedrich David Gräter, with notes, and another in rhyme by Valerius Wilhelm Neubeck (1793). In 1793 he published Disquisitions, Metaphysical and Literary. He followed David Hartley and Joseph Priestley in his metaphysical essays. In 1803 he published Nugæ Poeticæ, mainly versifications of Jack the Giant-Killer and Guy of Warwick.

Sayers then devoted himself to archæology, philology, and history. In 1805 he published Miscellanies, Antiquarian and Historical. In a dissertation he maintained that Hebrew was originally the east, and not the west, Aramaic dialect. Other papers dealt with English architecture, English poetry, Saxon literature, and early English history. In 1808 appeared Disquisitions, another collection of his prose works, dedicated to Thomas Fanshaw Middleton. He was also a frequent contributor to the Quarterly Review.

== Reputation ==
Walter Scott, writing on 20 June 1807 to acknowledge a copy of his collected poems, said he had long been an admirer of his ‘runic rhymes.’ In July 1801 Southey expressed to Taylor his indebtedness to Sayers for the metre of Madoc. In 1823 William Taylor published a collective edition of Sayers's works, with Opie's portrait engraved by William Camden Edwards as frontispiece, and an engraving of Sayers's house in the Close. Southey favourably reviewed the work in the Quarterly Review for January 1827.
