= Maria Kiene =

German education pioneer

- Born: Maria Sophie Thekla Kiene; 8 April 1889; Schwäbisch Hall, Württemberg, Germany
- Died: 28 September 1979 (aged 90); Freiburg i.B., West Germany
- Occupation: education pioneer
- Parent(s): Johannes Baptist von Kiene (1852-1919); Anna (born Anna Schneider)

Maria Kiene (8 April 1889 – 28 September 1979) was a kindergarten teacher who became the head of child welfare with the German Caritas association. She founded or co-founded socially focused institutions within the Catholic Church and exercised a decisive influence on the church's approach to operating kindergartens and to child welfare more generally.

== Life ==
Maria Sophie Thekla Kiene was born in Schwäbisch Hall, a small long-established town in the hilly countryside to the northeast of Stuttgart. She was the third of her parents' five recorded children. Johannes Baptist von Kiene (1852–1919), her father, was a lawyer and politician of the Centre Party who towards the end of his career would serve in Stuttgart as Minister of Justice and president of the Württemberg regional court. The family was a deeply religious one. The nature of her father's work meant that the family relocated several times while she was growing up. Maria was initially educated at home, but after the family moved to Ravensburg attended junior school in the town, then moving on briefly to the Senior Girls' School before the family moved again, in 1899, to Stuttgart where, following what amounted to a gap year in an Ursuline convent near Ahrweiler, she concluded her school career, passing her school final exams (Abitur) as an "external pupil" at a boys' secondary school (Gymnasium). The Abitur normally opened the way to university-level education, but at this time it was very unusual for girls' education to progress this far. During her year at the convent she had resolved to pursue a religious life, albeit outside the convent walls.

She next embarked on a study of applied economics (Volkswirtschaft) and philosophy, but fairly soon was obliged by serious illness to abandon that option. She recovered, but was unable to resume her studies in the turmoil that followed the war. Her father died in 1919 and for Maria there followed several unfulfilled years, living as her mother's spinster daughter (als "Haustochterdaseins"). It was in order to give her life greater meaning that shortly before reaching her thirtieth birthday she started work at the Stuttgart dame school (Mütterschule) which had been established by Luise Lampert and Anna Lindemann for young infants in 1917, and which was the first institution of its kind in Germany.

Kiene quickly identified the advantages she might obtain from professional training. She took a training course, the kindergarten seminar of the Württemberg regional committee of the German Catholic Women's Association (Kindergärtnerinnen-Seminar des Württembergischen Landesausschusses des katholischen Frauenbundes Deutschlands) in Schwäbisch Gmünd. Next she received training as a youth leader in Stuttgart at Friedrich Fröbel's Schwabian Women's Associations seminar (Fröbelseminar des Schwäbischen Frauenvereins). That was followed by five months as a "house mother" at the Heuberg Holiday and Convalescence Institution in Stuttgart and nine months as training director in the diocesan presidium for childcare in the Archdiocese of Cologne.

In 1922 Benedict Kreutz, president at the time of the church's Caritas association, appointed her to work with Alexandrine Hegemann at the Caritas national headquarters in Freiburg. After Hegemann died in 1926 it fell to Kiene to take on the leadership role in respect to childcare activities. The priority was the establishment and development of child recreation and childcare provisions, paying particular attention to service at the local level. As she later recalled, between approximately 1924 and 1926, recognising the essential connection between prevention and welfare, the Caritas association in the Stuttgart area created more than seven "forest recreation centres", operating primarily during the summer months and made available for kindergartens to use outside the holiday period. This meant that each kindergarten involved benefited from a four-week stay in the forest recreation camps. From this experience, children already weakened or injured could be identified, along with the need for Caritas and its specialist agencies to provide additional help for children who enjoyed good health but whose home situations nevertheless provided insufficient space for a fully relaxing and strengthening holiday. There was also a perceived correlation between deprivation — cramped housing, lack of contact with parents who worked full-time — and spiritual deprivation, which meant an ongoing threat to children's physical development.

On Kiene's initiative in 1927 a youth leadership seminar was established at Freiburg, subsequently merged into a precursor to today's Catholic University of Applied Sciences Freiburg. Kiene took on its headship. Young women with, if possible, several years of practical experience in day nurseries, kindergartens or similar establishments were offered a one-year training in "social education" with official state recognition. In this respect the Caritas Association was responding to the needs of the time, whereby a large number of professionally-trained Catholic women employees were needed for leading hands-on roles in welfare and education. Keine later wrote that the young women must be capable of handling particular responsibilities and tasks in larger educational institutions and all types of homes for children and adolescents, providing remedial teaching and youth care. They must understand how to apply principles and values of holistic life care, and the powerful ability to create a real home must form an important element in their repertoire of skills and abilities. The young women leaders must be vectors of professionalism in institutions such kindergartens, dame schools and similar establishments, and their particular teaching responsibility must always be to give motherly guidance in a socio-educational context through a wide range of working approaches to education and popular training. They must also bring to their work a broad and rich blend of experience and intuition. Kiene headed up the teaching at the institution until her retirement in 1966.

The Nazi take-over at the start of 1933 was followed by a rapid transition to one-party dictatorship. Kiene responded to the new set of challenges with "Christian steadfastness and directness". Early on she railed against the "tactical acceptance strategies" of some senior churchmen. She was particularly outspoken to the Jesuit Caritas director, Constantin Noppel (1883–1945), over the Osnabrück bishop, Wilhelm Berning who expressed doubts over whether educating children could really be characterised as a "direct apostolic task", which implicitly questioned whether working in Catholic kindergartens should be classified as church business. On 1 January 1934 the infamous Law for the Prevention of Hereditarily Diseased Offspring (Gesetz zur Verhütung erbkranken Nachwuchses) came into force. Kiene was appalled, and immediately wrote an impassioned letter to Constantin Noppel in Rome. Kiene's small 1939 book Ein Kind ist uns geschenkt. Von der weihnachtlichen Verantwortung christlicher Kinderhilfe (A child is given to us. From Christmas season responsibilities Christian help for children) set out her Christian charitable approach with a directness that makes it hard to understand how she was able to get the book published at that time. In any case, after it appeared she suffered serious difficulties with the Gestapo who placed her under intensified surveillance.

After war ended in the early summer of 1945, she sustained her commitment to educational qualification for kindergarten workers and youth leaders, and also in respect to recuperative and curative care. She also committed intensively to rebuilding and extending the kindergarten network. A particular case in point arose in 1946 when the Caritas Association took over Schloß Buchau, a former beguinage which under the Nazi regime had been used as a kindergarten workers' training location. Kiene built this into a model institution for restitutional and curative care for children and young people.

In its day Kiene's book Das Kind im Kindergarten (The Child in kindergarten, 1953) was widely recognised and distributed not merely in Catholic conservative circles, but more broadly. There were several editions, and it was also translated into Italian. In it, Maria Kiene presented the then-mainstream belief that kindergarten provision should not be a permanent need, and that the principal objective for kindergartens should be to make themselves redundant. She wrote:

"It has always been at the heart of Caritas childcare to identify the Kindergarten simply as an institution that complements the family. Any evaluation of the Kindergarten proceeds from the basis that that it is no sort of a substitute for the family nor indeed the school, as necessary contexts for childhood... As Friedrich Fröbel put it after deciding to create separate Kindergartens, 'We are there to make ourselves no longer necessary'. This is the spirit in which every Kindergarten worker should see her task."

== See also ==
- Caritas Europa
- Catholic social teaching
- Early childhood education
- Education in Germany
- Forest kindergarten
- Pedagogy
