= William Camden Edwards =

Welsh engraver

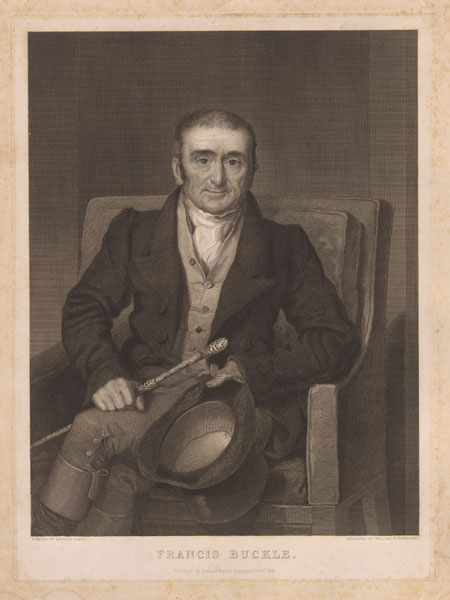
1831 engraving of the jockey Francis Buckle.

William Camden Edwards (1777 – 22 August 1855) was a Welsh engraver.

== Biography ==
Edwards was born in Monmouthshire in 1777. Early in the nineteenth century he went to Bungay, Suffolk, to engrave portraits and illustrations for the Bible, Pilgrim's Progress, and similar works published by the Bungay printer Charles Brightly. He left Bungay after Brightly's death, but eventually returned and settled there until his death on 22 August 1855. He was buried in the cemetery of Holy Trinity, Bungay.

The banker and antiquary Dawson Turner held in his collection a complete series of his engravings and etchings. Edwards was very industrious, and his productions were varied. The majority of his plates were portraits, in which he excelled. Among these were Sir Joshua Reynolds, Dr. Johnson, after Reynolds, Sir William Chambers, after Reynolds, John Flaxman, after John Jackson, William Hogarth, after a self-portrait, Fuseli, after Sir Thomas Lawrence, James Hogg, after Charles Fox (1784-1849), Frank Sayers after John Opie, and many others. Among his other plates were Milton and his Daughters, after George Romney, a landscape after Salvator Rosa, and The Head of St. John the Baptist on a Charger, from a picture in Dawson Turner's collection.
