= Hans Beißwenger =

German World War II fighter pilot (1916–1943)

- Beißwenger as a Leutnant
- Born: 8 November 1916; Mittelfischach, Schwäbisch Hall
- Died: 6 March 1943 (aged 26); MIA south of Staraya Russa, Soviet Union
- Military career
- Allegiance: Nazi Germany
- Branch: Luftwaffe
- Service years: 1937–1943
- Rank: Oberleutnant (first lieutenant)
- Nickname: Beißer—biter
- Unit: JG 54
- Commands: 6./JG 54
- Conflicts: See battles World War II: Balkans Campaign; Eastern Front; Operation Barbarossa
- Awards: Knight's Cross of the Iron Cross with Oak Leaves

Hans Beißwenger (Note: His name, in German, is spelled with a "sharp S"; see ß.) (8 November 1916 – 6 March 1943) was a German Luftwaffe fighter ace and recipient of the Knight's Cross of the Iron Cross with Oak Leaves during World War II. A flying ace or fighter ace is a military aviator credited with shooting down five or more enemy aircraft during aerial combat. In 500 combat missions, Beißwenger was credited with 152 victories, making him the 34th highest-scoring Luftwaffe fighter pilot of World War II. He was "ace-in-a-day" twice, shooting down five aircraft on a single day. All but one of his victories were claimed over the Eastern Front. He was reported missing in action in March 1943.

== Early life and career ==
Beißwenger was born on 8 November 1916 at Mittelfischach über Sulzbach in the district of Schwäbisch Hall in Württemberg. He was the son of Volksschule, a combined primary and lower secondary school, teacher. Following his graduation, he volunteered for military service in the Luftwaffe on 2 November 1937, initially serving with the Flak artillery. He was assigned to the 8th battery of Flak-Regiment 25 in Göppingen, where he received his basic military training. On 1 April 1938, he was posted to a Jagdfliegerschule for flight and fighter pilot training. In October 1940, more than one year after the start of World War II, Beißwenger was transferred to the II. Gruppe (2nd group) of Jagdgeschwader 54 (JG 54—54th Fighter Wing). (Note: For an explanation of Luftwaffe unit designations see Organization of the Luftwaffe during World War II.) He was promoted to Leutnant (second lieutenant) of the Reserves on 1 November 1940.

== World War II ==
Assigned to 6. Staffel (6th squadron) of JG 54 based in France, Beißwenger's posting fell into a period of recuperation following the costly Battle of Britain. I. Gruppe had been the first to leave France and was sent to Jever on 27 September 1940. His II. Gruppe was moved to an airfield at Delmenhorst on 3 December 1940. On 29 March 1941, the Geschwaderstab (headquarters unit), II. And III. Gruppe were ordered to relocate to Austria in preparation of the Invasion of Yugoslavia. The Geschwaderstab and II. Gruppe were then both located at Graz.

The order for the invasion had been put forward in "Führer Directive No. 25", which Adolf Hitler issued on 27 March 1941, following the pro-British Yugoslav coup d'état in Belgrade. He claimed his first aerial victory on 7 April 1941, when he shot down a Yugoslav Royal Air Force Hawker Hurricane fighter. JG 54 continued flying ground support missions during the Balkans Campaign. Following the surrender of the Royal Yugoslav Army on 17 April 1941, while stationed at an airfield at Zemun near Belgrade, the Geschwader received orders on 3 May 1941 to turn over all Messerschmitt Bf 109-Es to Jagdgeschwader 77 (JG 77—77th Fighter Wing) so they could receive the new Bf 109-F variant. Transition training was completed at Airfield Stolp-Reitz in Pomerania. Following the Balkans Campaign, Beißwenger was awarded the Iron Cross 2nd Class (Eisernes Kreuz 2. Klasse) on 6 May 1941.

=== War against the Soviet Union ===
On the Eastern Front, serving with 3./JG 54 (3rd squadron), Beißwenger became a leading scorer in I./JG 54 (1st group). Although he was shot down on 17 July 1941 behind enemy lines, he escaped capture and returned to his base. He claimed his 20th aerial victory over an I-18 fighter, an early German designation for a Mikoyan-Gurevich MiG-1 fighter, on 24 August 1941. By the end of 1941, his total stood at 32 aerial victories. He claimed his 40th victory on 6 April 1942, on 8 May, he achieved his 50th victory, and the following day, he received the Knight's Cross of the Iron Cross (Ritterkreuz des Eisernen Kreuzes) on 9 May 1942 for 50 victories claimed. (Note: According to Weal for 47 aerial victories, but according to Obermaier he had achieved his 50th aerial victory was achieved the previous day on 8 May.) Beißwenger and Leutnant Horst Hannig received the Knight's Cross from General der Flieger Helmuth Förster at Siverskaya. On 10 August 1942, Beißwenger was appointed Staffelkapitän (squadron leader) of 6./JG 54. He succeeded Hauptmann Carl Sattig who was posted as missing in action, assumed killed in action that day.

On 15 August 1942, he claimed his 75th aerial victory and his 100th on 30 September, for which he was awarded the Knight's Cross of the Iron Cross with Oak Leaves (Ritterkreuz des Eisernen Kreuzes mit Eichenlaub) on 30 September. He was the 25th Luftwaffe pilot to achieve the century mark. He became "ace-in-a-day" on 23 August during three combat missions, when for the first time he achieved five aerial victories in one day. On 4 September 1942, Hauptmann Dietrich Hrabak, his group commander, filed an officer efficiency report requesting a preferential promotion to Oberleutnant (First Lieutenant). The report highlighted that he "has excelled in action as a fighter pilot" and that "during 449 combat flights, he has 97 kills because of his audacity". The report further described Beißwenger as having "good leadership talent" and being "positive as a National Socialist". His promotion was approved and, after a short vacation, Beißwenger returned to combat duty and by the end of 1942, his victory total stood at 119. He claimed his 125th aerial victory on 23 January 1943, 135th by 11 February 1943 and five more on 5 March 1943 (146th – 150th aerial victories).

He did not return to base after an air combat south of Lake Ilmen near Staraja Russa on 6 March 1943 and Oberleutnant Hans Beißwenger, flying Bf 109 G-2 (Werknummer 14236—factory number) "yellow 4", was posted as missing. His Schwarm had been engaged in a combat with four Soviet fighters. Beißwenger claimed his last two victories, numbers 151 and 152, over Lavochkin LaGG-3 fighters that day. The Messerschmitt Bf 109 of Unteroffizier Georg Munderloh was damaged in a midair collision, and Munderloh reported that he would try to reach his base. Eventually, he had to land in enemy territory. Taken prisoner, he was later told by Soviet pilots involved in the action that they had shot down another German fighter, which could have been Beißwenger. Another German pilot observed Beißwenger's aircraft flying at low altitude, clearly suffering from engine problems, attempting to return to friendly territory. After that, there was no trace of him. Beißwenger was later listed as missing in action. It may be that Beißwenger was brought down by Starshiy Leytenant Ivan Kholodov of 32 GvIAP (Guards Fighter Aviation Regiment—Gvardeyskiy Istrebitelny Aviatsionny Polk). Kholodov rammed the Bf 109—probably Beißwenger's—that was attacking his wingman, Leytenant Arkadiy Makarov, and managed to bail out of his own damaged craft before it crashed.

== Summary of career ==
=== Aerial victory claims ===
According to US historian David T. Zabecki, Beißwenger was credited with 152 aerial victories. Obermaier also lists Beißwenger with shooting down 152 enemy aircraft, all but one on the Eastern Front. In addition, he claimed the destruction of one tethered balloon. He flew over 500 combat missions during his career. Spick states that Beißwenger had a mission-to-claim ratio of 3.29. Mathews and Foreman, authors of Luftwaffe Aces – Biographies and Victory Claims, researched the German Federal Archives and found records for 150 aerial victory claims. This number includes one claim during the Balkans Campaign and 149 on the Eastern Front.

Victory claims were logged to a map-reference (PQ = Planquadrat), for example "PQ 18262". The Luftwaffe grid map (Jägermeldenetz) covered all of Europe, western Russia and North Africa and was composed of rectangles measuring 15 minutes of latitude by 30 minutes of longitude, an area of about 360 square miles (930 km^{2}). These sectors were then subdivided into 36 smaller units to give a location area 3x4km in size.

Chronicle of aerial victories
This and the ♠ (Ace of spades) indicates those aerial victories which made Beißwenger an "ace-in-a-day", a term which designates a fighter pilot who has shot down five or more airplanes in a single day. This and the ! (exclamation mark) indicates those aerial victories listed by Prien, Stemmer, Rodeike and Bock. This and the # (hash mark) indicates those aerial victories listed by Mathews and Foreman.
Claim!	Claim#	Date	Time	Type	Location	Claim!	Claim#	Date	Time	Type	Location
– 6. Staffel of Jagdgeschwader 54 –
1	1	7 April 1941	17:50	Hurricane	south of Neusatz	27	27	17 September 1941	17:00	I-18 (MiG-1)	
2	2	22 June 1941	09:50	I-16		28	28	17 September 1941	17:09	I-18 (MiG-1)	
3	3	26 June 1941	09:30	SB-2		29	29	23 September 1941	10:33	I-16	
4	4	30 June 1941	13:17	SB-2		30		23 September 1941	10:33	tethered balloon	
5	5	2 July 1941	18:29	SB-2		31	30	2 October 1941	09:10	I-18 (MiG-1)	
6	6	2 July 1941	18:30	SB-2		32	31	27 October 1941	13:00	SB-3	
7	7	2 July 1941	18:35	SB-2		33	32	6 November 1941	07:35	I-18 (MiG-1)	
8	8	6 July 1941	18:31	DB-3		34	33	16 March 1942	11:45	Pe-2	
9	9	7 July 1941	10:55	SB-3		35	34	20 March 1942	09:00	P-40	
10	10	17 July 1941	09:37	SB-2		36	35	26 March 1942	09:05	Il-2	
11	11	20 July 1941	18:50	I-18 (MiG-1)		37	36	29 March 1942	12:55	P-40	
12	12	25 July 1941	08:00	DB-3		38	37	1 April 1942	08:54	I-18 (MiG-3)	
13	13	30 July 1941	11:20	I-18 (MiG-1)		39	38	1 April 1942	08:56	I-18 (MiG-3)	
14	14	31 July 1941	09:12	SB-2		40	39	6 April 1942	14:05	MiG-3	
15	15	31 July 1941	19:15	SB-2		41	40	6 April 1942	14:10	MiG-3	
16	16	3 August 1941	12:22	I-16		42	41	18 April 1942	06:26	MiG-3	
17	17	18 August 1941	18:36	I-18 (MiG-1)		43	42	19 April 1942	18:15	LaGG-3	
18	18	18 August 1941	18:59	I-18 (MiG-1)		44	43	20 April 1942	10:35	Yak-1	
19	19	20 August 1941	07:35	I-16		45	44	25 April 1942	10:45	Pe-2	
20	20	24 August 1941	17:35	I-18 (MiG-1)		46	45	27 April 1942	16:45	Yak-1	
21	21	7 September 1941	11:02	I-16		47	46	29 April 1942	07:25	MiG-3	
22	22	7 September 1941	18:35	I-18 (MiG-1)		48	47	29 April 1942	07:28	MiG-3	
23	23	8 September 1951	18:35	I-18 (MiG-1)		49	48	7 May 1942	10:19	Il-2	
24	24	11 September 1941	18:30	I-18 (MiG-1)		50	49	8 May 1942	16:10	Il-2	
25	25	14 September 1941	12:30	I-16		51	50	8 May 1942	16:20	MiG-3	
26	26	14 September 1941	16:40	I-18 (MiG-1)							
– 3. Staffel of Jagdgeschwader 54 –
52	51	11 May 1942	11:53	P-40		46	55	28 May 1942	15:10	Pe-2	
53	52	13 May 1942	17:38	P-40		57	56	3 June 1942	05:47	MiG-3	
54	53	13 May 1942	17:45	MiG-3		58	57	5 June 1942	07:20	MiG-3	
55	54	13 May 1942	17:45	MiG-3							
– 6. Staffel of Jagdgeschwader 54 –
59	58	7 June 1942	14:53	MiG-3		107	106	4 December 1942	10:12	Il-2	southwest of Solzy
60	59	18 July 1942	10:53	MiG-3	Bol Maljestanki; Malyushki train station	108	107	4 December 1942	13:05	La-5	south of Strelitzky
61	60	19 July 1942	14:58	MiG-3	Samosche; Lamosche	109	108	5 December 1942	07:50	Il-2	north of Strelitzky
62	61	20 July 1942	07:05	Yak-1	Maljutschi; Malijutuji	110	109	6 December 1942	11:58	La-5	PQ 18262; 30 km (19 mi) east-southeast of Staraya Russa
63	62	27 July 1942	20:25	MiG-3	west of Lake Werschina west of Vershinaskoye	111	110	12 December 1942	13:58	LaGG-3	10 km (6.2 mi) east of Lake Werchne
64	63	30 July 1942	18:44	Yak-1	Malaja Nowyje Gorki; Malaya Kovejebovki	112	111	25 December 1942	12:12	Il-2	PQ 18292; 40 km (25 mi) southeast of Staraya Russa
65	64	2 August 1942	16:15	Yak-1	southwest of Zaluchye	113	112	29 December 1942	12:35	LaGG-3	PQ 18292; 40 km (25 mi) southeast of Staraya Russa
66	65	4 August 1942	12:23	Yak-1	Lawatitzy vicinity of Lovapischty	114	113	29 December 1942	12:53	P-39	PQ 18261; 30 km (19 mi) east-southeast of Staraya Russa
67	66	6 August 1942	15:26	Pe-2	east-southeast of Gzhatsk	115	114	30 December 1942	11:45 (Note: According to Mathews and Foreman claimed at 11:40.)	LaGG-3	PQ 18153; 25 km (16 mi) northwest of Demyansk
68	67	6 August 1942	19:20	Yak-1	east of Zubtsov	116	115	30 December 1942	12:15	La-5	PQ 18264; 30 km (19 mi) east-southeast of Staraya Russa
69	68	6 August 1942	19:26	Yak-1	east of Zubtsov	117	116	30 December 1942	14:05	LaGG-3	PQ 28113; 40 km (25 mi) northwest of Demyansk
70	69	8 August 1942	16:13	Yak-1	south of Pogarelje southeast of Pogorskoje	118	117	30 December 1942	14:12	LaGG-3	PQ 19677; 30 km (19 mi) east-northeast of Staraya Russa
71	70	9 August 1942	09:36	Yak-1	southwest of Nowaja-Alexandrowka southwest of Kowaja-Alekandrovka	119	118	5 January 1943	09:55	La-5	PQ 18231; 30 km (19 mi) east-southeast of Staraya Russa
72	71	9 August 1942	09:39	Yak-1	southwest of Nowaja-Alexandrowka southwest of Kowaja-Alekandrovka	120	119	5 January 1943	10:15	La-5	PQ 28121; 40 km (25 mi) northwest of Demyansk
73	72	9 August 1942	09:42	Yak-1	west of Nikolskaya	121		7 January 1943	09:23	LaGG-3	PQ 18231
74	73	9 August 1942	09:46	Yak-1	west of Nikolskaya	122	120	7 January 1943	10:39 (Note: According to Mathews and Foreman claimed at 10:50.)	Il-2	PQ 19891; 30 km (19 mi) east-northeast of Staraya Russa
75	74	10 August 1942	18:40	Yak-1	northwest of Rzhev	123	121	14 January 1943	12:15	La-5	PQ 10411; 25 km (16 mi) east-southeast of Mga
76	75	10 August 1942	18:41	Yak-1	northwest of Rzhev	124	122	14 January 1943	12:45	P-40	PQ 00254; 15 km (9.3 mi) west-southwest of Schlüsselburg
77	76	11 August 1942	09:36	Pe-2	southeast of Ssosnedowo southeast of Tsossedowo	125	123	15 January 1943	09:50	LaGG-3	PQ 18263; 30 km (19 mi) east-southeast of Staraya Russa
78	77	11 August 1942	09:37	Pe-2	southeast of Ssosnedowo east of Tsossedowo	126	124	15 January 1943	09:55	LaGG-3	PQ 18244; 30 km (19 mi) east-southeast of Staraya Russa
79	78	12 August 1942	17:30	Il-2	north-northwest of Rzhev	127	125	15 January 1943	10:05	P-39	PQ 28142; 30 km (19 mi) northwest of Demyansk
80	79	14 August 1942	18:30	Yak-1	PQ 47554; 15 km (9.3 mi) northwest of Rzhev	128	126	24 January 1943	08:25	P-40	PQ 00262; 10 km (6.2 mi) southwest of Schlüsselburg
81	80	15 August 1942	05:47	Yak-1	PQ 47344; 20 km (12 mi) east-northeast of Zubtsov	129	127	24 January 1943	10:30	LaGG-3	PQ 10182 east of Mga
82	81	15 August 1942	10:20	Yak-1	PQ 47592 north of Rzhev	130	128	25 January 1943	10:05	PS-40	PQ 00233; 10 km (6.2 mi) west of Schlüsselburg
83	82	19 August 1942	12:23	LaGG-3	PQ 54162; 25 km (16 mi) south of Sukhinichi	131	129	26 January 1943	08:55	MiG-3	PQ 00293; 10 km (6.2 mi) west of Mga
84	83	21 August 1942	06:10	Yak-1	PQ 55853; 25 km (16 mi) east of Sukhinichi	132	130	26 January 1943	11:05	LaGG-3	PQ 10142 south of Schlüsselburg
85	84	21 August 1942	06:23	Yak-1	PQ 55853; 25 km (16 mi) east of Sukhinichi	133	131	27 January 1943	14:05	LaGG-3	PQ 10153 southeast of Schlüsselburg
86♠	85	23 August 1942	06:10	Pe-2	PQ 54253; 25 km (16 mi) west-northeast of Belyov	134	132	27 January 1943	14:10	LaGG-3	PQ 10142 south of Schlüsselburg
87♠	86	23 August 1942	06:10	Yak-1	PQ 54234; 20 km (12 mi) northeast of Belyov	135	133	11 February 1943	10:15	La-5	south of Senino south of Lenin
88♠	87	23 August 1942	11:48	Yak-1	PQ 54234; 20 km (12 mi) northeast of Belyov	136	134	18 February 1943	10:20	La-5	PQ 36 Ost 10644; 20 km (12 mi) east of Luban
89♠	88	23 August 1942	11:53	Yak-1	PQ 55894; 30 km (19 mi) east-southeast of Sukhinichi	137	135	19 February 1943	12:07 (Note: According to Mathews and Foreman claimed at 12:09.)	LaGG-3	PQ 35 Ost 18423; 40 km (25 mi) southeast of Staraya Russa
90♠	89	23 August 1942	14:50	Yak-1	PQ 5426; 15 km (9.3 mi) west-northeast of Belyov	138	136	20 February 1943	12:15	LaGG-3	PQ 35 Ost 18463; 30 km (19 mi) west of Demyansk
91	90	24 August 1942	14:52	Yak-1	PQ 28131; 30 km (19 mi) north of Demyansk	139	137	21 February 1943	08:35	LaGG-3	PQ 35 Ost 18451; 45 km (28 mi) west-southwest of Demyansk
92	91	25 August 1942	11:50	Yak-1	PQ 47863; 20 km (12 mi) east-southeast of Zubtsov	140	138	21 February 1943	08:38	LaGG-3	PQ 35 Ost 18483; 45 km (28 mi) west-southwest of Demyansk
93	92	26 August 1942	09:35	Pe-2	PQ 47683; 15 km (9.3 mi) northeast of Zubtsov	141	139	21 February 1943	08:40	LaGG-3	PQ 35 Ost 18453; 40 km (25 mi) west of Demyansk
94	93	26 August 1942	14:40	Il-2	PQ 37663; 25 km (16 mi) west-northwest of Rzhev	142	140	21 February 1943	08:45	LaGG-3	PQ 35 Ost 18414; 30 km (19 mi) south-southeast of Staraya Russa
95	94	28 August 1942	05:10	Yak-1	PQ 47552; 15 km (9.3 mi) northeast of Rzhev	143		27 February 1943	15:14	Pe-2	PQ 35 Ost 18442
96	95	2 September 1942	18:15	Yak-1	PQ 10242; 25 km (16 mi) east-southeast of Schlüsselburg	144	141	27 February 1943	15:24	LaGG-3	PQ 35 Ost 18367; 40 km (25 mi) south of Staraya Russa
97	96	3 September 1942	11:30	LaGG-3	PQ 00244; 20 km (12 mi) southeast of Leningrad	145	142	27 February 1943	15:35	La-5	PQ 35 Ost 18452; 20 km (12 mi) east of Krassnyj
98	97	5 September 1942	11:10 (Note: According to Mathews and Foreman claimed as a LaGG-3 at 11:40.)	Yak-1	PQ 28433; 25 km (16 mi) east-northeast of Demyansk	146	143	2 March 1943	08:38	LaGG-3	PQ 35 Ost 18192; 20 km (12 mi) south-southeast of Staraya Russa
99	98	26 September 1942	16:17 (Note: According to Mathews and Foreman claimed at 16:58.)	Yak-1	PQ 28212; 30 km (19 mi) north-northeast of Demyansk	147♠	144	5 March 1943	06:48	LaGG-3	PQ 35 Ost 29773; 40 km (25 mi) east-northeast of Staraya Russa
100	99	30 September 1942	08:47	LaGG-3	PQ 29783; 40 km (25 mi) north-northwest of Demyansk	148♠	145	5 March 1943	09:42	Yak-1	PQ 35 Ost 18221; 25 km (16 mi) east-southeast of Staraya Russa
101	100	6 October 1942	07:10	Hurricane	PQ 38751; 10 km (6.2 mi) east of Ostraschkow	149♠	146	5 March 1943	09:43	Yak-1	PQ 35 Ost 18222; 25 km (16 mi) east-southeast of Staraya Russa
102	101	6 October 1942	07:13	Yak-1	PQ 28862; 10 km (6.2 mi) west of Ostraschkow	150♠	147	5 March 1943	13:50	Il-2	PQ 35 Ost 18213; 20 km (12 mi) east-southeast of Staraya Russa
103	102	6 November 1942	07:20	Pe-2	PQ 28112; 40 km (25 mi) northwest of Demyansk	151♠	148	5 March 1943	13:57	Yak-1	PQ 35 Ost 18223; 25 km (16 mi) east-southeast of Staraya Russa
104	103	7 November 1942	08:58	LaGG-3	PQ 38741 vicinity of Ostraschkow	152	149	6 March 1943	14:53	LaGG-3	PQ 35 Ost 18364; 40 km (25 mi) south of Staraya Russa
105	104	3 December 1942	12:35	Yak-1	southwest of Weretenj southwest of Lake Nevatina	153	150	6 March 1943	14:57	LaGG-3	PQ 35 Ost 18443; 40 km (25 mi) south-southeast of Staraya Russa
106	105	3 December 1942	13:09	LaGG-3	6 km (3.7 mi) southeast of the airfield Bryansk						

=== Awards ===
- Iron Cross (1939)
  - 2nd class (6 May 1941)
  - 1st class (16 August 1941)
- Honor Goblet of the Luftwaffe (Ehrenpokal der Luftwaffe) (9 August 1941)
- Front Flying Clasp of the Luftwaffe for Fighter Pilots in Gold (20 August 1941)
- German Cross in Gold on 17 October 1941 as Leutnant of the Reserves in the 6./Jagdgeschwader 54
- Knight's Cross of the Iron Cross with Oak Leaves
  - Knight's Cross on 9 May 1942 as Leutnant and pilot in the 6./Jagdgeschwader 54 (Note: According to Scherzer as Leutnant (war officer).)
  - 130th Oak Leaves on 30 September 1942 as Leutnant and pilot in the 6./Jagdgeschwader 54 (Note: According to Scherzer as Oberleutnant (war officer).)

== See also ==
- List of people who disappeared
