= Heilbronn-Franconia =

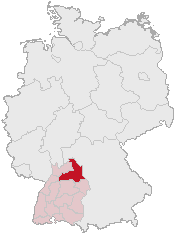
Locator map for the region Heilbronn-Franken within Germany

Heilbronn-Franken is a region in northeastern Baden-Württemberg, Germany, in the Stuttgart subdivision (Regierungsbezirk). It consists of the former Free imperial city of Heilbronn, Heilbronn district and the districts of Hohenlohe, Main-Tauber and Schwäbisch Hall.

It covers an area of 4765 km^{2} in the northeast of Baden-Wuerttemberg, with a population of roughly 0.9 million. The administrative seat of the region is Heilbronn.

The Heilbronn-Franken region is part of the European metropolitan region of Stuttgart and has the highest density of world market leaders among all regions across Germany measured against their number of inhabitants. Heilbronn-Franken has experienced an outstanding development with regard to the dynamic of its innovation process.

The region is administratively part of Baden-Württemberg, especially the eastern parts of it (Hohenlohe) are, however, culturally a part of Franken (engl. Franconia, hence the second half of the name), as the population there mostly speaks Franconian rather than Swabian dialects of German. This area is known as Tauberfranken, after the Tauber river, that is flowing through it, and borders in the north and east with the Franconian regions of Lower Franconia and Middle Franconia, that belong to Bavaria. Towards the west, the region borders the Rhine-Neckar region, to the south the Stuttgart Region.

Apart from Heilbronn, smaller cities in the region are Bad Mergentheim, Crailsheim, Künzelsau, Neckarsulm, Öhringen, Schwäbisch Hall, Tauberbischofsheim and Wertheim.
