= Schwäbisch Hall =

City in Baden-Württemberg, Germany

- Town
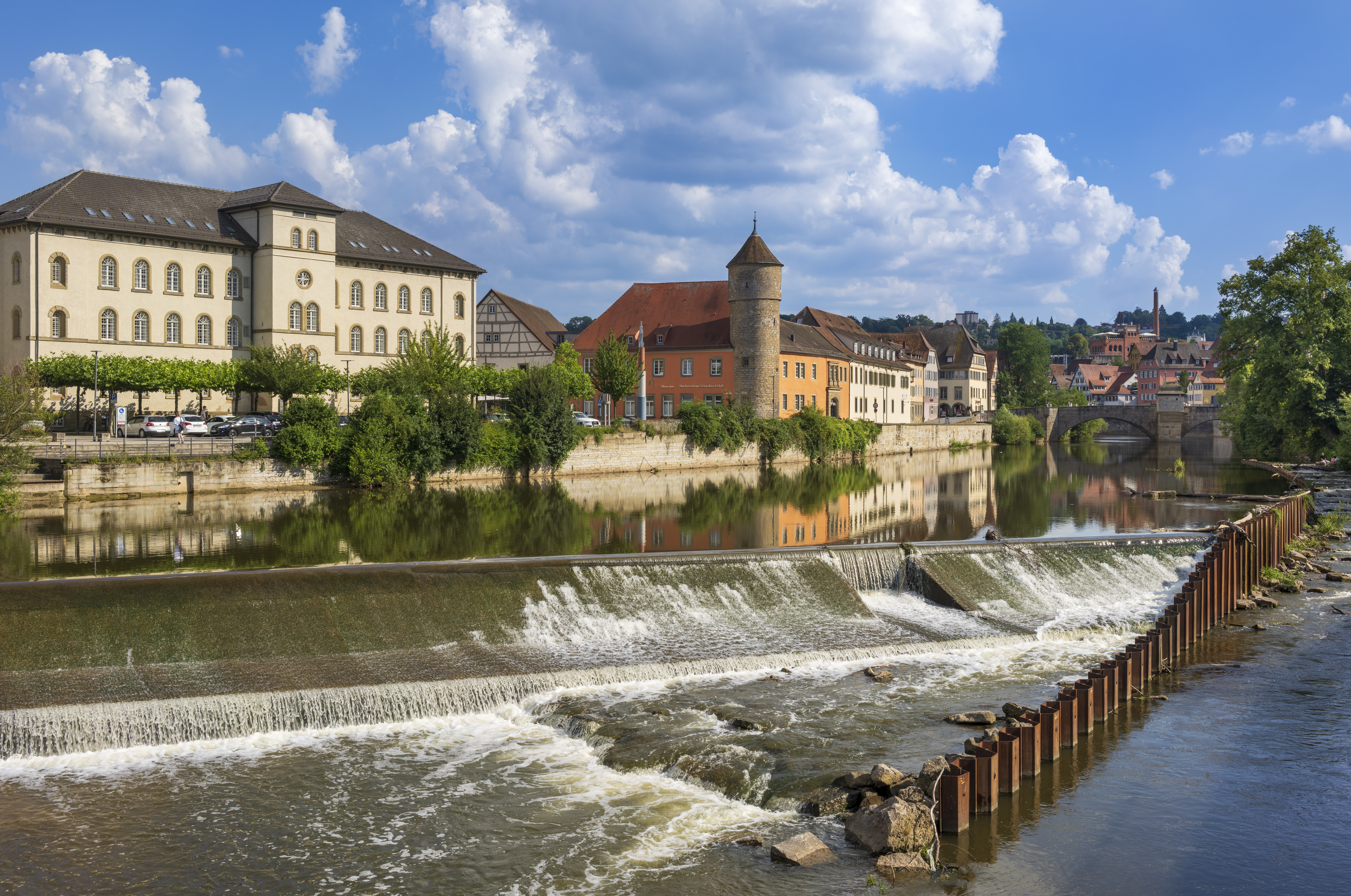
- Old town on Salinenstrasse

- Coat of arms

- Location of Schwäbisch Hall within Schwäbisch Hall district
- Interactive map of Schwäbisch Hall
- Location within Germany Location within Baden-Württemberg
- Coordinates: 49°6′44″N 9°44′15″E
- Country: Germany
- State: Baden-Württemberg
- Admin. region: Stuttgart
- District: Schwäbisch Hall
- Subdivisions: Kernstadt and 8 Stadtteile

Government
  - Mayor (2021–29): Daniel Bullinger (FDP)

Area
  - Total: 104.19 km^{2} (40.23 sq mi)
- Elevation: 304 m (997 ft)

Population (2025-12-31)
  - Total: 42,705
  - Density: 409.88/km^{2} (1,061.6/sq mi)
- Time zone: UTC+01:00 (CET)
  - Summer (DST): UTC+02:00 (CEST)
- Postal codes: 74523
- Dialling codes: 0791, 07907 (Sulzdorf, Tüngental), 07977 (Sittenhardt, Wielandsweiler)
- Vehicle registration: SHA, CR
- Website: www.schwaebischhall.de

Schwäbisch Hall (German pronunciation: [ˌʃvɛːbɪʃ ˈhal]; 'Swabian Hall'; from 1802 until 1934 and colloquially: Hall) is a city in the German state of Baden-Württemberg located in the valley of the Kocher river, the longest tributary (together with its headwater Lein) of the Neckar river. The closest larger city is Heilbronn, and Schwäbisch Hall lies north-east of the state capital of Stuttgart. It is the seat of the district (Landkreis) of Schwäbisch Hall.

Unlike its name might suggest, Schwäbisch Hall lies in the region of Heilbronn-Franconia, the East Franconian-speaking northeasternmost part of Baden-Württemberg, which is culturally and linguistically more closely related to the adjoining region of Franconia in neighbouring Bavaria than to the Alemannic-speaking regions of Württemberg, Baden, Switzerland, Bavarian Swabia, Vorarlberg, Alsace and Liechtenstein.

The city's main landmarks are the market square with St Michael's Church (St. Michaelskirche), Comburg Castle (a former Benedictine monastery) with St Nicholas' Church (St. Nikolaus und St. Maria), and the Hallian-Franconian Museum (Hällisch-Fränkisches Museum), dedicated to the art and history of Schwäbisch Hall and surrounding Heilbronn-Franconia.

Schwäbisch Hall was a Free Imperial City within the Holy Roman Empire for five centuries until it was annexed by Württemberg in 1802.

== Etymology ==
"Schwäbisch" refers to the Swabian League (German: Schwäbischer Bund). The origin of the second part of the name, "Hall", is unclear. It might be derived from a West Germanic word family that means "drying something by heating it", possibly referring to the open-pan salt making method used there until the saltworks closed down in 1925.

== History ==
=== Early history ===
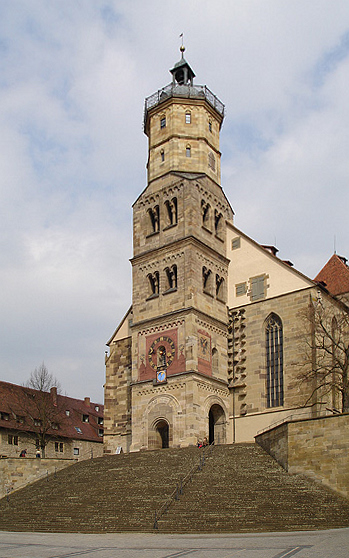
St. Michael's Church

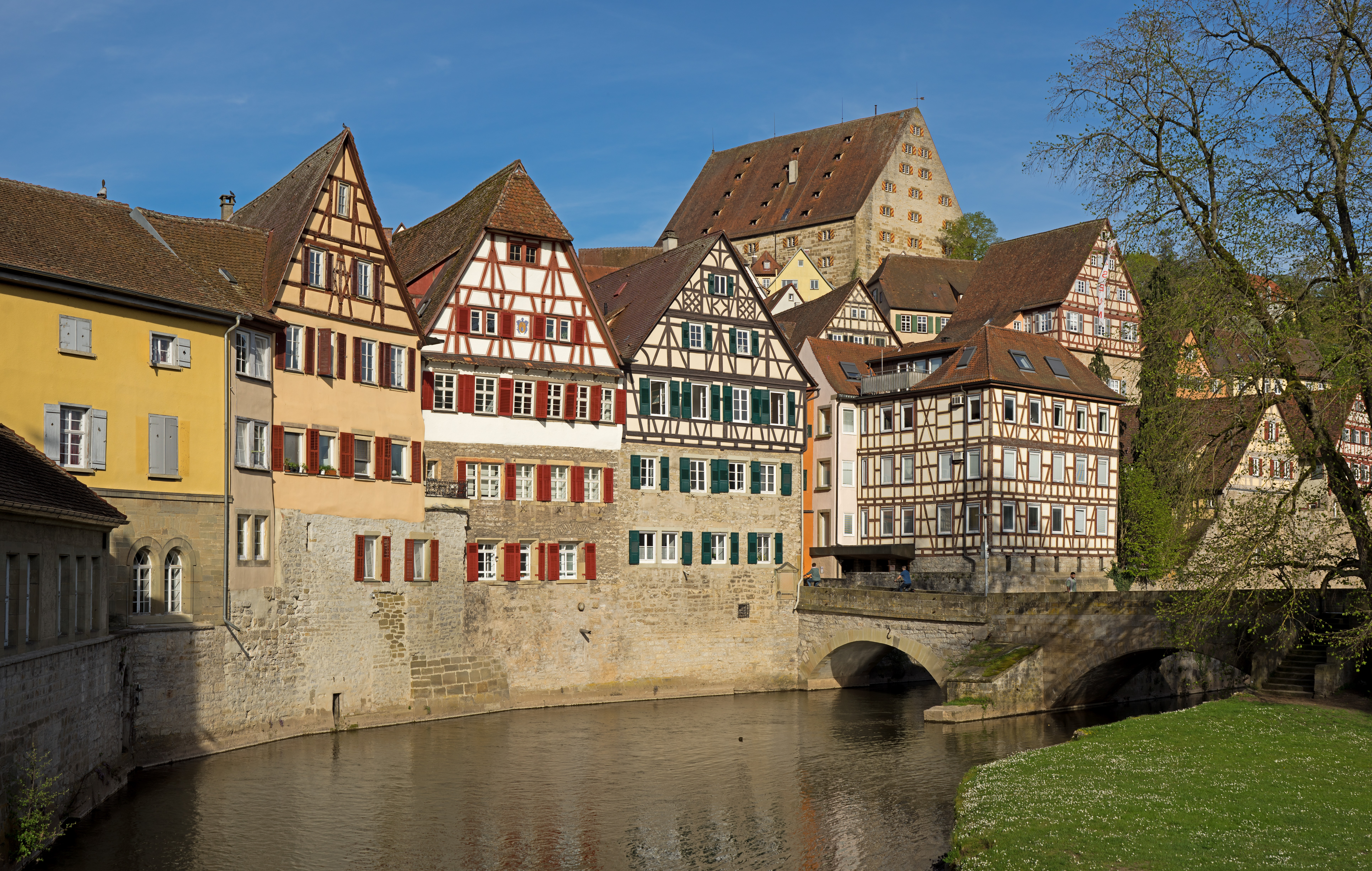
Houses in the centre next to the river Kocher

Salt was produced from brine by the Celts at the site of Schwäbisch Hall as early as the fifth century BCE. The town was first mentioned in a document called Öhringer Stiftungsbrief dating from 1063. The village probably belonged first to the Counts of Comburg-Rothenburg and went from them to the Imperial house of Hohenstaufen (ca 1116). It was probably Emperor Frederick I who founded the imperial mint and started the coining of the so-called Heller. Hall flourished through the production of salt and coins. Since 1204 it has been called a town.

After the fall of the house of Hohenstaufen, Hall defended itself successfully against the claims of a noble family in the neighbourhood (the Schenken von Limpurg). The conflict was finally settled in 1280 by Rudolph I of Habsburg; this allowed the undisturbed development into a Free Imperial City (Reichsstadt) of the Holy Roman Empire. Emperor Louis IV the Bavarian granted a constitution that settled internal conflicts (Erste Zwietracht) in 1340. After this, the city was governed by the inner council (Innerer Rat) which was composed of twelve noblemen, six "middle burghers" and eight craftsmen. The head of the council was the Stättmeister (mayor). A second phase of internal conflicts 1510–12 (Zweite Zwietracht) brought the dominating role of the nobility to an end. The confrontation with the noble families was started by Stättmeister Hermann Büschler, whose daughter Anna Büschler is the subject of a popular book by professor Steven Ozment ("The Bürgermeister's Daughter: Scandal in a sixteenth-century German city"). The leading role was taken over by a group of families who turned into a new ruling class. Amongst them where the Bonhöffers, the ancestors of Dietrich Bonhoeffer.

=== Middle Ages ===
From the 14th to the 16th centuries, Hall systematically acquired a large territory in the surrounding area, mostly from noble families and the Comburg monastery. The wealth of this era can still be seen in some gothic buildings like St. Michael's Church (rebuilt 1427–1526) with its impressive stairway (1507). The city joined the Protestant Reformation very early. Johannes Brenz, a follower of Martin Luther, was made pastor of St. Michael's Church in 1522 and quickly began to reform the church and the school system along Lutheran lines.

Hall suffered severely during the Thirty Years' War, though it was never besieged or scene of a battle. However, it was forced to pay enormous sums to the armies of the various parties, especially to the imperial, Swedish and French troops, who also committed numerous atrocities and plundered the city and the surrounding area. Between 1634 and 1638 every fifth inhabitant died of hunger and disease, especially from the bubonic plague. The war left the city an impoverished and economically ruined place. But with the help of reorganizations of salt production and trade and a growing wine trade, there was an astonishingly fast recovery.

=== 17th century to early 20th century ===
Fires were a constant threat to the mostly wooden houses. The great fires of 1680 and especially of 1728 destroyed much of the city, which led to new buildings in the Baroque style, such as the city hall.

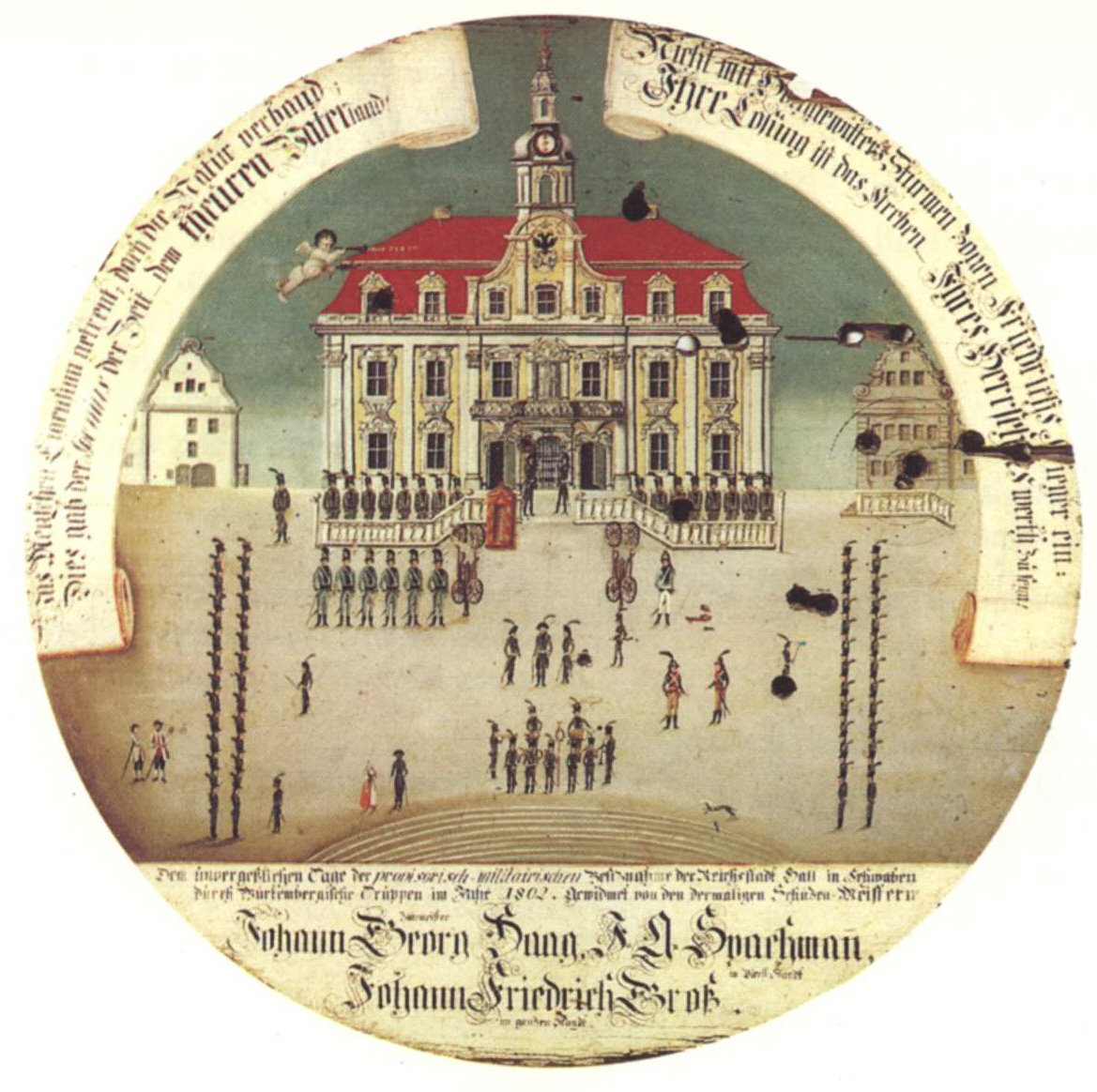
The 1802 mediatization of Hall in contemporary imagery

The Napoleonic Wars brought the history of Hall as a Free Imperial City to an end. Following the Treaty of Lunéville (1801), the duke of Württemberg was allowed by Napoleon to occupy the city and several other minor states as a compensation for territories on the Left Bank of the Rhine that fell to France. This took place in 1802 — Hall lost its territory and its political independence and became a Oberamtsstadt (seat of an Oberamt, comparable to a county). Ownership of the salt works was handed over to the state. A long economic crisis during the 19th century forced many citizens to move to other places in Germany or to emigrate overseas, mostly to the United States. While other towns like Heilbronn grew steadily due to the Industrial Revolution, the population of Hall stagnated. The economic situation improved during the second half of the 19th century — a main factor was the railway line to Heilbronn (1862) — but was not followed by a significant growth of the city. It was not until the 1920s and 1930s that new settlements were built on the heights surrounding the old town. Hall also grew through the incorporation of Steinbach (1930) and Hessental (1936).

In 1827, a health spa was established on one of the islands in the Kocher river. Especially after the building of the railway (1862) it became a considerable economical factor. The well-preserved old town also brought a rising number of tourists. Since the beginning of the 20th century, Hall has developed many festivities. Especially well known are the theatre productions which are performed every year in the centre of the city on the steps of St. Michael.

=== Nazi Germany and World War II ===
In 1934, Hall was officially named Schwäbisch Hall. During the Third Reich a Luftwaffe air base was built at Hessental. During Kristallnacht on 9 November 1938, local Nazis burned the synagogue in Steinbach and devastated shops and houses of Jewish citizens. Approximately 40 Jewish citizens of Schwäbisch Hall fell victim to the Holocaust in extermination camps in Eastern Europe. In 1944 a concentration camp was established next to the train station Hall-Hessental. The train station at Hall was targeted by an American air raid on February 23, 1945, but the devastation was mostly limited to the suburbs of St. Katharina and Unterlimpurg. The city was occupied by US Army troops on April 17, 1945, without serious resistance; though several buildings were destroyed or damaged, the historical old town suffered comparatively little.

=== Post World War II ===
In 1960, Schwäbisch Hall reached the status of a Große Kreisstadt. This means that the city took over some tasks of the district. From the end of World War II until the end of the Cold War, Dolan Barracks and Schwäbisch Hall Army Air Field was a kaserne which hosted a series of US Army aviation units and ordnance units until it was turned back over to German control in 1993.

== Demographics ==
As of December 31, 2009, Schwäbisch Hall has a population of 36,799. The residents come from over 100 countries. As of December 31, 2008, there are 18,838 Protestants, 7,375 Roman Catholics and 10,234 who are either in another religion or not religious. In 2017, Schwäbisch Hall had a population of over 39,000.

== Climate ==
Climate data for Schwäbisch Hall (1991-2020)
Month	Jan	Feb	Mar	Apr	May	Jun	Jul	Aug	Sep	Oct	Nov	Dec	Year
Daily mean °C (°F)	1.1 (34.0)	1.8 (35.2)	5.4 (41.7)	9.7 (49.5)	13.7 (56.7)	17.2 (63.0)	19.0 (66.2)	18.6 (65.5)	14.2 (57.6)	9.6 (49.3)	5.0 (41.0)	1.9 (35.4)	9.8 (49.6)
Average precipitation mm (inches)	74 (2.9)	65 (2.6)	71 (2.8)	51 (2.0)	80 (3.1)	78 (3.1)	89 (3.5)	71 (2.8)	59 (2.3)	75 (3.0)	70 (2.8)	89 (3.5)	872 (34.4)
Mean monthly sunshine hours	55.7	81.9	134.3	185	210.7	225.6	240.4	226.1	168.2	110.1	59	45.5	1,742.5
Source: Deutscher Wetterdienst

== Architecture ==
Schwäbisch Hall has a mix of historic and modern buildings. The older are mostly medieval, and with Timber Frame, Gothic and Baroque styles dominating the city centre. The more modern are on the outskirts and suburbs, helping preserve the history of the city.

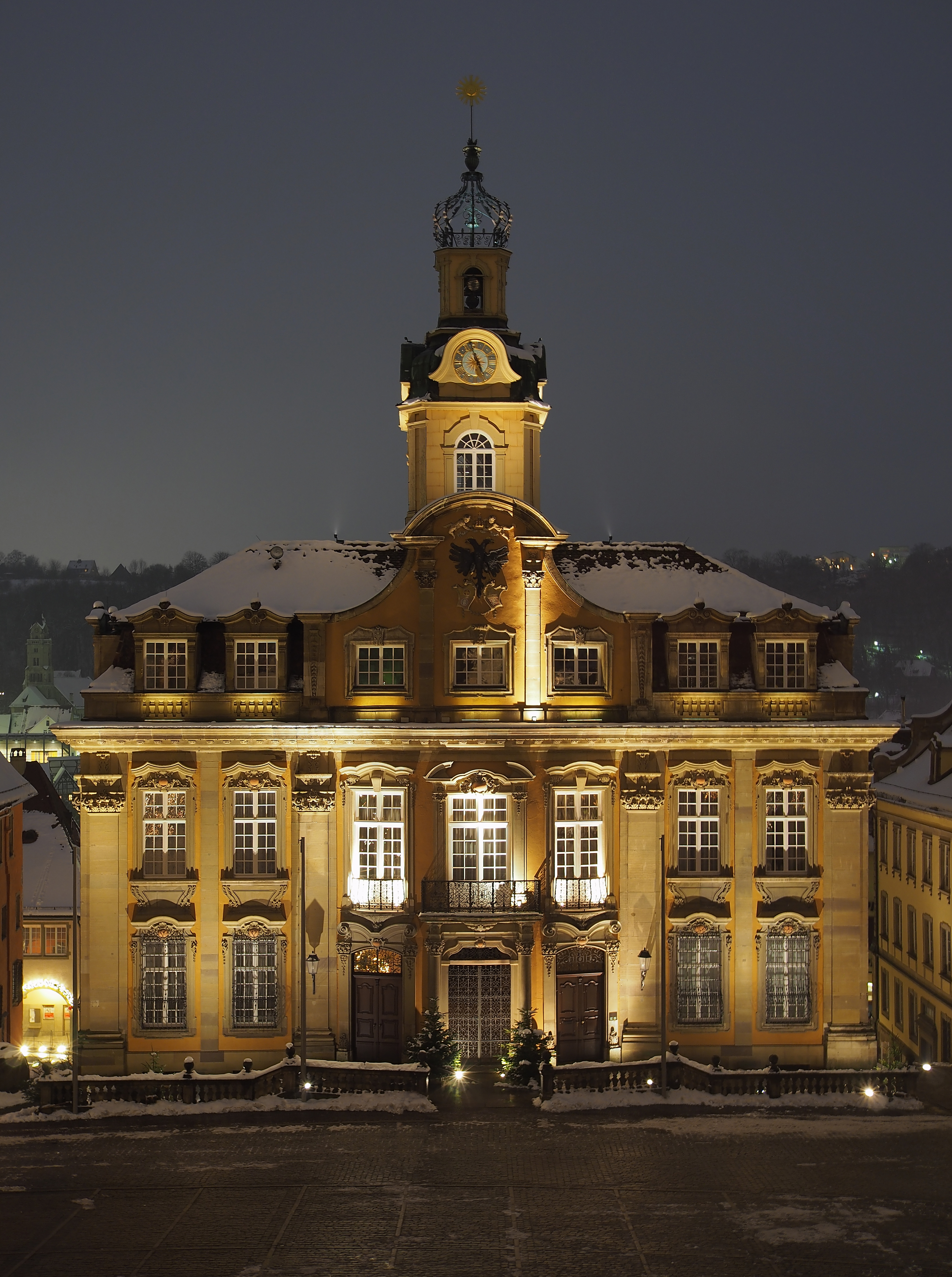
City hall by night

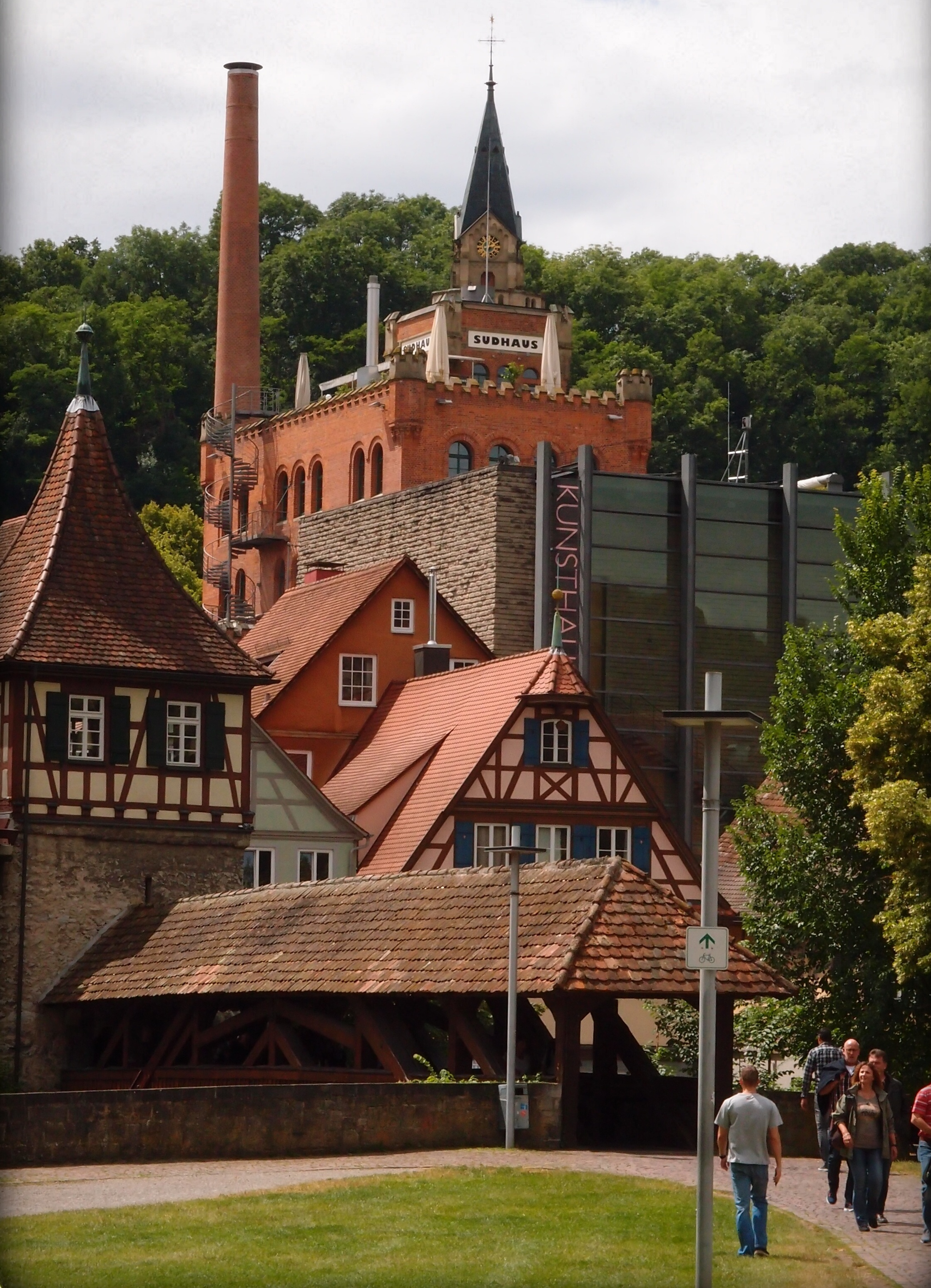
Ensemble of houses with modern Kunsthalle Würth

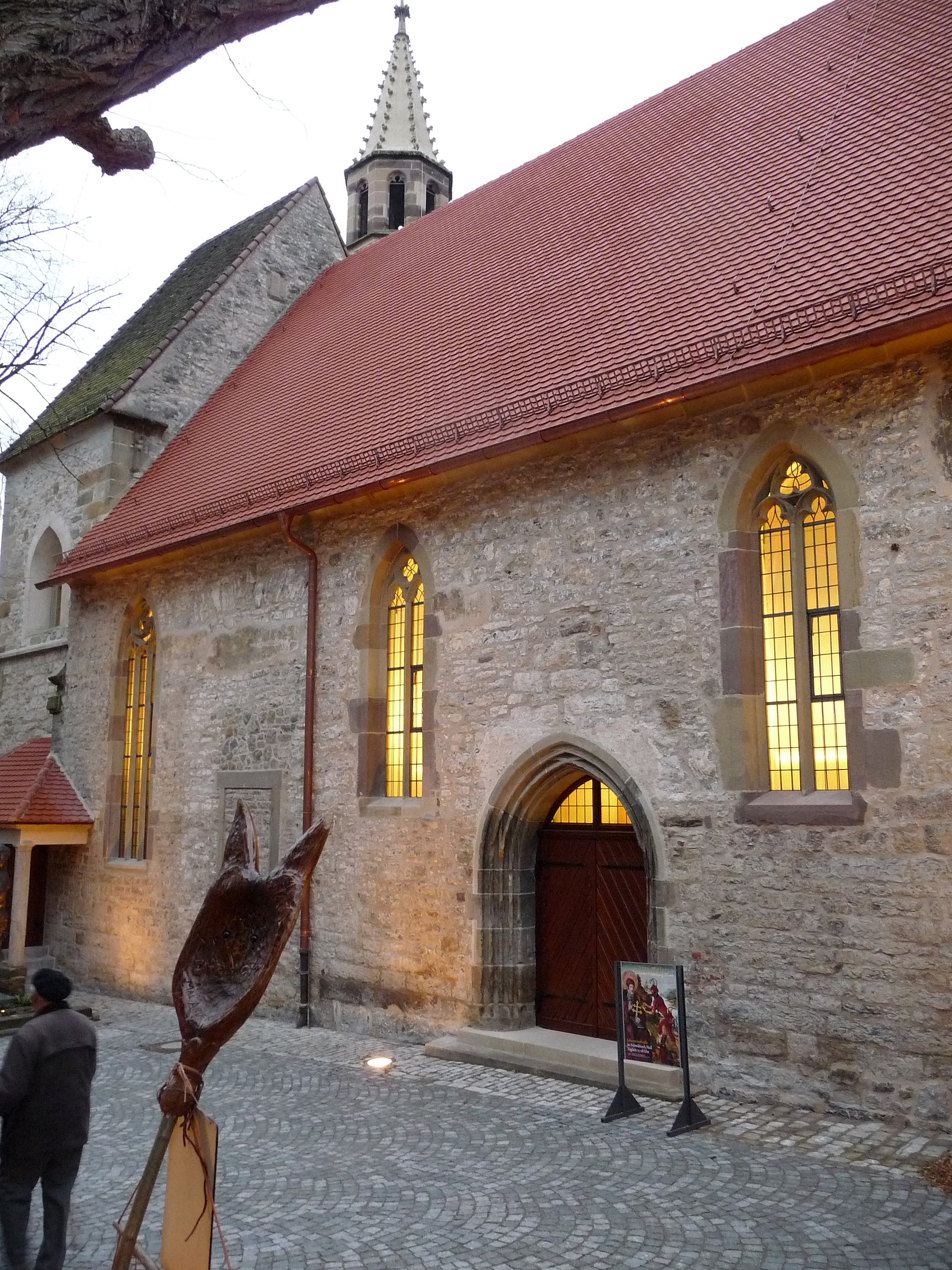
Johanniterhalle, exhibition site of Darmstadt Madonna

== Culture ==
There is an outdoor summer theatre which performs on the open-air staircase at St. Michael's Church and at the Globe Theatre. The Hällisch-Frankische Museum and the Hohenloher Freilandmuseum (Wackershofen open air museum) shows the history of the region starting from the Middle Ages.

The Kunsthalle Würth, a modern art gallery, can be explored to see paintings, graphic art, and sculptures dating from the 19th century onward. Schwäbisch Hall and the surrounding area offer a plenty of leisure activities which includes sports flying, swimming, hiking and cycling.

Other parts of the city's culture include the Salt Festival where the historical salt economy of the city is celebrated, the Summer Night Festival, the Baker's Oven Festival and the Christmas Market which includes traditional handicrafts.

The town hall has a cycle of 22 murals painted by Livio Retti.

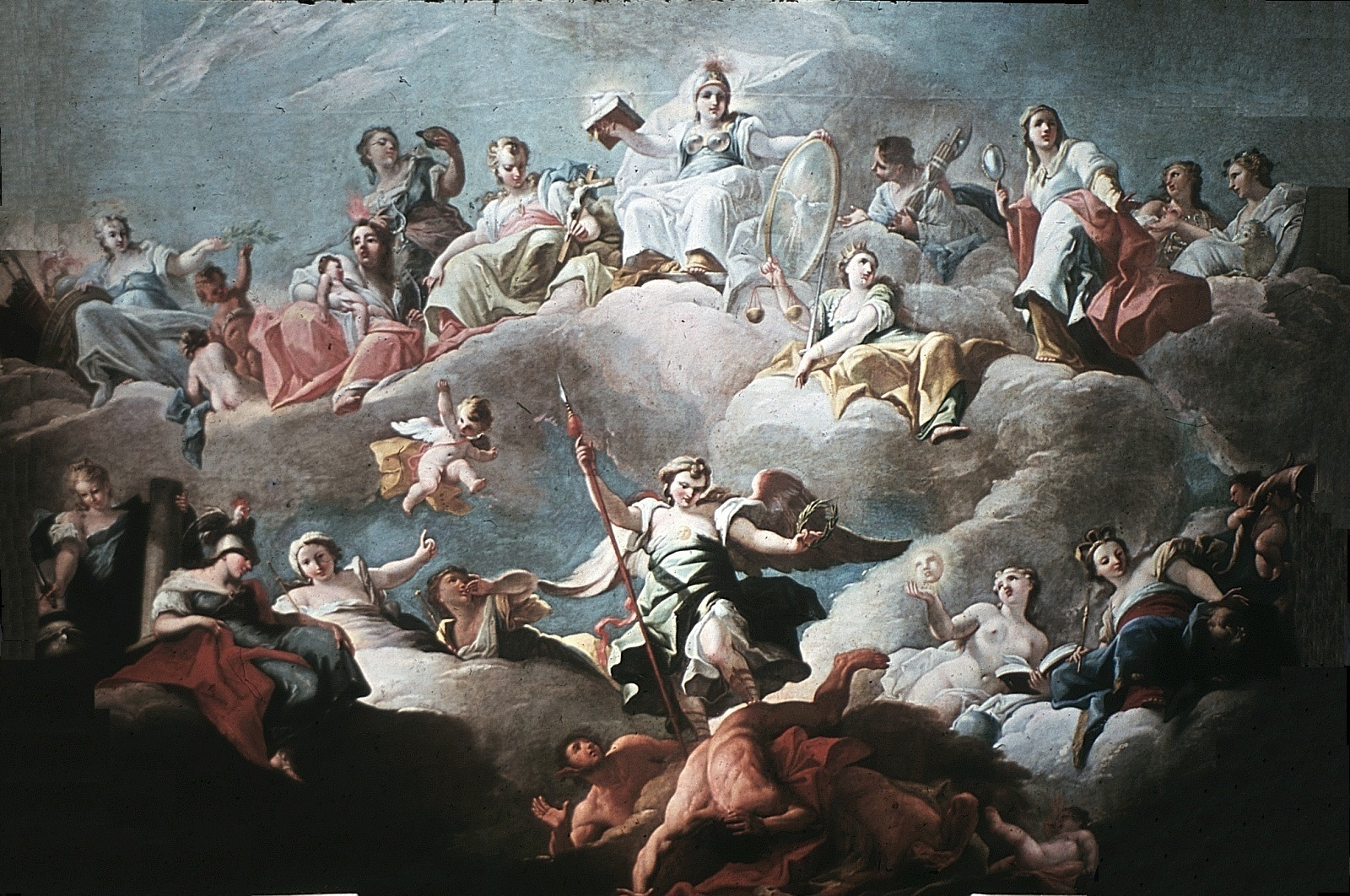
"Victory of virtue over vices" on the ceiling of the Great Council Chamber of the City Hall, by Livio Retti

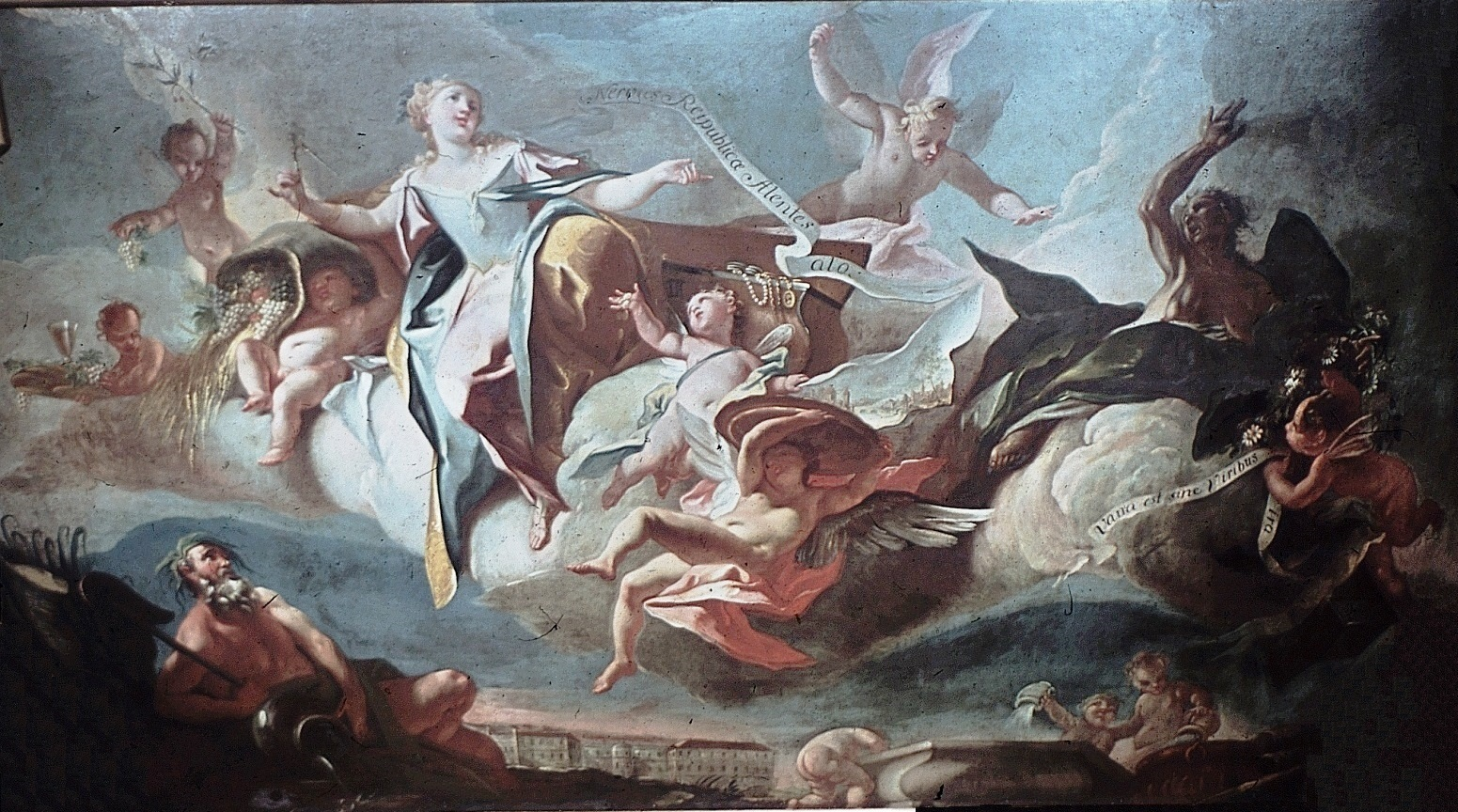
Allegory of the city and its prosperity

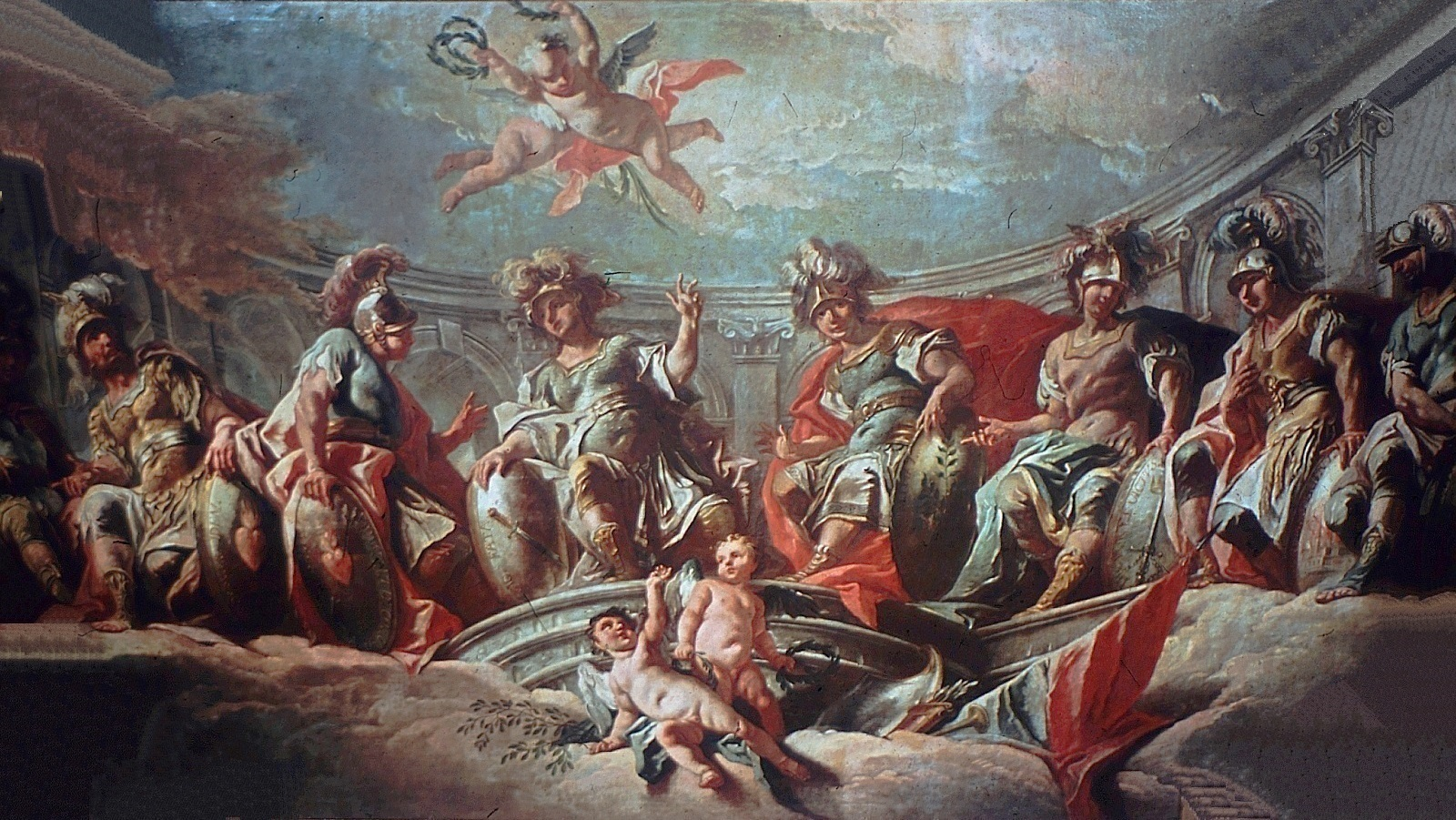
Oil painting on the ceiling of the hero room of the city hall: Greek and Roman heroes.

== Education ==
Schwäbisch Hall has a long tradition as a city of learning.

Schwäbisch Hall offers education opportunities through vocational schools and various technical schools. Programs are offered in schools such as Schwäbisch Hall Evangelical School of Social Work, Social Service Department of Social Professions, Protestant vocational school for the elderly, School of Alternative Education Nursing, School of Nursing and the Ayurvedic teaching and training institute, the Institute of Ayurveda and Yoga.

Due to a branch of the Goethe-Institut at Schwäbisch Hall, the city attracts up to 2,000 students a year, coming from countries around the world to study the German language. The programs are especially popular during the summer, as college students attend the program over their break to earn credits and improve their German.

The City Archives Hall is a documentation centre, which allows for historical research and memory management. The duties of the City Archives Hall are the ordering, preparing, evaluating and management of its archives and collections, to support historical research, to collaborate in exhibitions and to publish its own or other publications on the history of Schwäbisch Hall.

The archive keeps official records and files of the present city administration and its predecessors, and of collection items of different type and origin, which refer to the city, such as photographs, posters, graphics, paintings, maps and plans, or a newspaper clipping collection. There are also extensive library collections in the literature on the history of Schwäbisch Hall and the region, as well as valuable historical prints.

== Politics ==
The Lord Mayor of Schwäbisch Hall is Daniel Bullinger, elected in July 2021. He succeeded Hermann-Josef Pelgrim, who had been in office since 1997. The city administration was an early mover in the migration from Microsoft Windows to Linux and open source software in the early years of the 21st century.

=== Next scheduled elections for citizens of Schwäbisch Hall ===
Election	Timeframe	Length of term	Ref.
Mayor	Spring 2013	8 Years	
Federal	Autumn 2013	4 years	
Ortschaftsrat	Summer 2014	5 years	
Council	Summer 2014	5 years	
District Council	Summer 2014	5 years	
European Parliament	Summer 2014	5 years	
State	Spring 2016	5 years	

== Economy ==
Schwäbisch Hall is the most important regional economic hub between Frankfurt, Stuttgart and Nuremberg. Formerly, salt was important to Schwäbisch Hall, but today the economy is shaped by a group of medium-sized companies, focusing mainly on trade and services sectors. A number of businesses dealing in property finance, solar energy and telecommunications sectors also have their headquarters in Schwäbisch Hall. Notable companies are Bausparkasse Schwäbisch Hall AG, a housing credit company, founded in 1944 and RECARO Aircraft Seating, an aircraft seats manufacturer.

Annually, there are up to 600 overnight stays in Schwäbisch Hall hotels by Goethe-Institut students.

Overnight stays		Ref.
Total	193,213	
By foreigners	41,600	
Tax rates	Rate	Ref.
Land tax A	400 v.H.	
Land tax B	400 v.H.	
Trade tax	280 v.H.	
Retail trade		Ref.
Catchment area	160,000 people	
City SHA	305.1 Mio. Euro	
Per capita	8,320 Euro	
Purchasing power of the city	100.2	
Employment stats		Ref.
People employed and subjected to social insurance	20,563	
producing trade	5,188	
trade, restaurants and traffic	3,424	
service sector	11,951	
Incoming commuters	12,119	
Outgoing commuters	4,809	
Unemployment rate	4.5%	

=== Transport ===
==== Roads ====
Schwäbisch Hall has an exit on the Autobahn 6 (Heilbronn–Nürnberg). Federal highways 14 (Stuttgart–Nürnberg) and 19 (Ulm–Aalen–Schwäbisch Hall–Würzburg) also run through the city.

==== Railways ====
Schwäbisch Hall-Hessental station is at the junction of the Waiblingen–Schwäbisch Hall railway and the Crailsheim–Heilbronn railway and Schwäbisch Hall station (the city station) is on the Crailsheim–Heilbronn railway.

==== Aviation ====
The city is served by two aerodromes, very close to each other, but neither offers commercial air transport. To the North of Tüngentaler Strasse is the recreational grass airfield of Weckrieden (EDTX), to the South is Adolf Würth Airport (EDTY), closely associated with the Würth group of companies and hosting their own business jet operations.

== Health ==
Schwäbisch Hall has a history with brine. The first brine bath started in 1827. Diakonie-Krankenhaus, with 574 beds, is the main hospital in Schwäbisch Hall. There are 100 general practitioners, medical specialists and physiotherapists in Schwäbisch Hall. There are health fairs such as Well-Vital Health Fair and the Haller Gesundheits- und Naturheiltagen in Schwäbisch Hall.

== Sports ==
The sports played in Schwäbisch Hall include swimming, light athletics, tennis, shooting, soccer, baseball, handball and American football. There are 22 sports halls and 25 outdoor playing fields. The Schwäbisch Hall Unicorns have been among the preeminent German American football teams ever since their two national championships in 2011 and 2012. The Unicorns are further notable for being the former team of Moritz Böhringer.

== Twin towns – sister cities ==
Schwäbisch Hall is twinned with:

- Épinal, France (1964)
- Loughborough, England, United Kingdom (1966)
- Lappeenranta, Finland (1985)
- Neustrelitz, Germany (1988)
- Zamość, Poland (1989)
- Balıkesir, Turkey (2006)
- Rasht, Iran (2016)

== Notable people ==
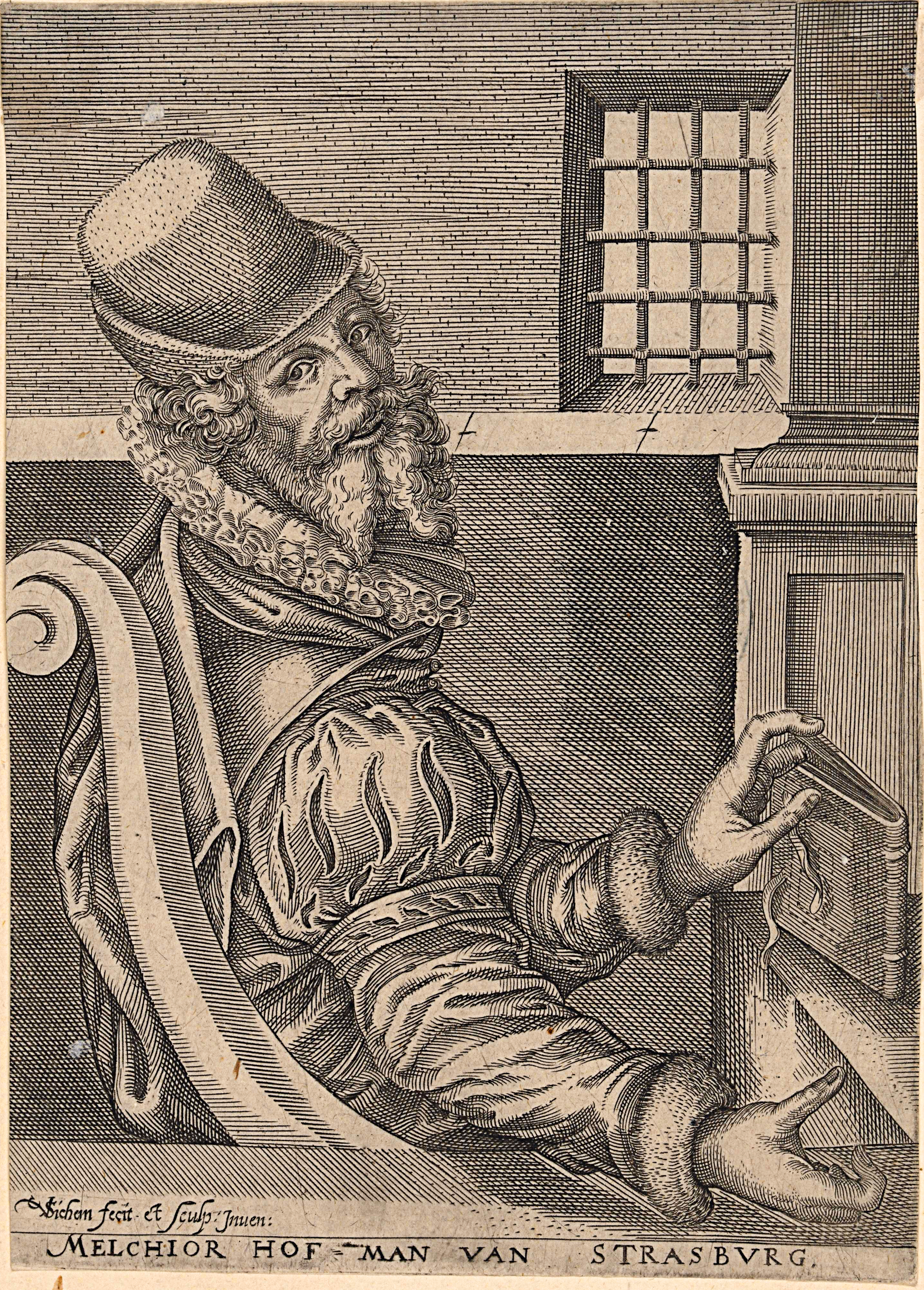
Melchior Hofmann, 1600

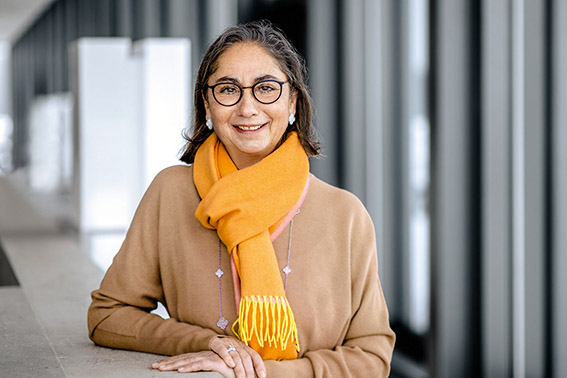
Bettina Würth, 2021

- Melchior Hofmann (around 1500–1543), anabaptist leader.
- Thomas Schweicker (1540–1602), armless artist, used his feet to create his art.
- Johann Ulrich Steigleder (1593–1635), Baroque composer and organist
- Friedrich David Gräter (1768–1830), was one of the founders of Scandinavian studies and Germanic philology.
- Prince Frederick of Württemberg (1808–1870), prince from House of Württemberg
- Louis Braun (1836–1916), painter, mostly of battle scenes.
- Otto Ruff (1871–1939), fluorine chemist
- Maria Kiene (1889–1979), teacher and child welfare association head
- Walter Haeussermann (1914 in Künzelsau – 2010), German-American aerospace engineer and physicist
- Hans Beißwenger (1916–1943), Luftwaffe pilot
- Wolfgang Gönnenwein (1933–2015), conductor and music educator
- Kraft, Prince of Hohenlohe-Langenburg (1935–2004), ninth head of the House of Hohenlohe-Langenburg.
- Princess Beatrix of Hohenlohe-Langenburg (1936–1997), princess from the House of Hohenlohe-Langenburg
- Joachim Rücker (born 1951), diplomat
- Susanne Erding-Swiridoff (born 1955), composer and curator.
- Bettina Würth (born 1961), Swiss billionaire businesswoman from the Würth Group.
- Hartmut Abendschein (born 1969), German – Swiss writer
- Heinrich Schmieder (1970–2010), actor

=== Sport ===
- Marco Sailer (born 1985), footballer, played over 310 games
- Tobias Weis (born 1985), footballer, played 226 games
- Louk Sorensen (born 1985), Irish former tennis player
- Jonas Koch (born 1993), cyclist
