= Moßbach =

- Municipality
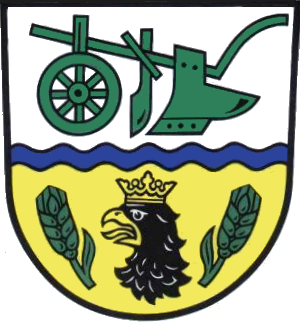
- Coat of arms

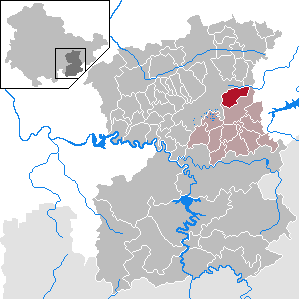
- Location of Moßbach within Saale-Orla-Kreis district
- Interactive map of Moßbach
- Location within Germany Location within Thuringia
- Coordinates: 50°40′57″N 11°49′10″E
- Country: Germany
- State: Thuringia
- District: Saale-Orla-Kreis
- Municipal assoc.: Seenplatte

Government
  - Mayor (2021–27): Gisela Krösel

Area
  - Total: 9.70 km^{2} (3.75 sq mi)
- Elevation: 450 m (1,480 ft)

Population (2025-12-31)
  - Total: 387
  - Density: 39.9/km^{2} (103/sq mi)
- Time zone: UTC+01:00 (CET)
  - Summer (DST): UTC+02:00 (CEST)
- Postal codes: 07907
- Dialling codes: 036648
- Vehicle registration: SOK
- Website: www.mossbach.de

Moßbach is a municipality in the district Saale-Orla-Kreis, in Thuringia, Germany.
