= Friedrich David Gräter =

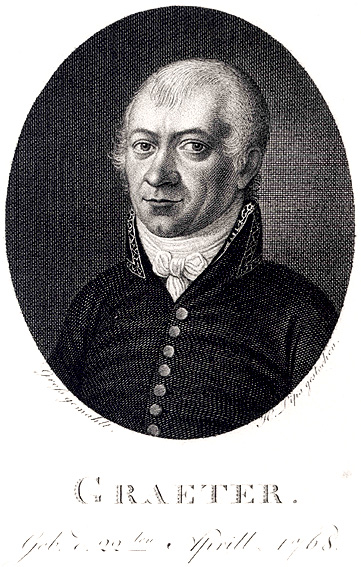
Etching after a portrait by Georg Peter Groß (1782–1858).

Friedrich David Gräter (1768 – 1830) was one of the founders of the field of Scandinavian studies and Germanic philology in Germany.

A native of Schwäbisch Hall, Gräter studied theology, philosophy, and philology in Halle and Erlangen. He worked as a gymnasium teacher of Greek and Hebrew in Schwäbisch Hall from 1804 as rector. He was a member of Pegnesischer Blumenorden from 1781 and member of the Berlin Academy of Sciences from 1792. He married Christiane Spittler in 1799. They had no children and divorced in 1803. In 1805, Gräter married Maria Elisabetha, née Hofmann, widowed Seiferheld und Haspel, with whom he had a daughter. In 1818, he became rector of the gymnasium at Ulm. He retired in 1826 and moved to Schorndorf.

Gräter was among the first scholars to systematically approach old German and Scandinavian philology in the 1780s and 1790s. He published an anthology of Old Norse poetry in 1789 (Nordische Blumen). He was the editor of the journals Bragur and Idunna und Hermode. He bitterly criticized the Romanticist character of the early publications of the Brothers Grimm. The enmity between Gräter and the Grimms contributed to a systematic suppression of Gräter's achievements in the earlier history of the field; in the opinion of Heinrichs (1986), the Grimms "all but succeeded in suppressing the founder of scholarly Nordic studies in Germany."
