= Fritz Michel =

German physician, politician, historian and art historian

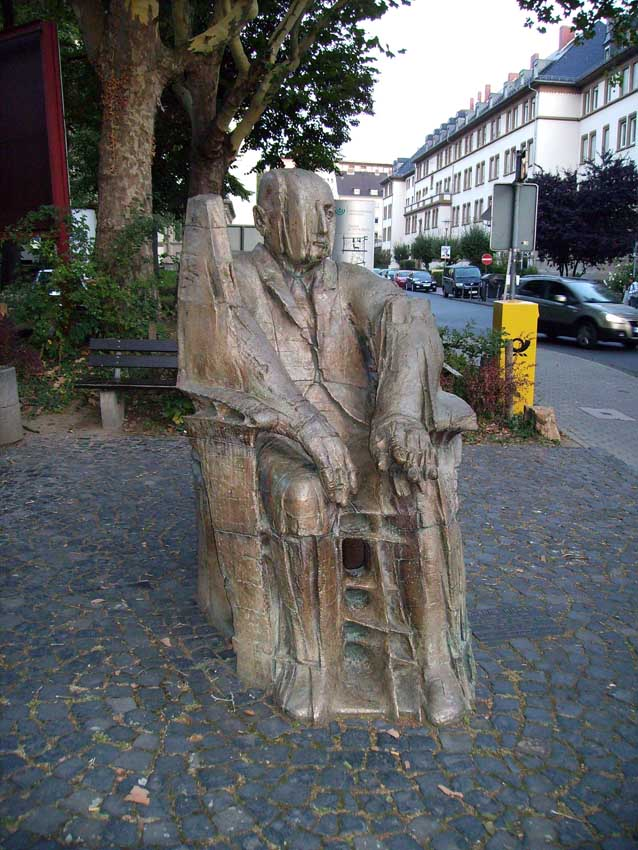
Monument to Fritz Michel in Koblenz

Fritz Michel (17 September 1877 – 30 October 1966) was a German physician, politician, historian and art historian.

== Life ==
Michel was born in Niederlahnstein as the eldest son of a country doctor. His parents were Theodor Michel and Luise Schild. He studied medicine at the universities of Eberhard Karls Universität Tübingen, Christian-Albrechts-Universität zu Kiel and Philipps-Universität Marburg and became a member of the Corps Suevia Tübingen in Tübingen. After completing his studies, he took up a post as a gynaecologist at the Evangelisches Stift St. Martin Koblenz in 1905. In the same year he married Luise von Ibell, a great-granddaughter of the Nassau statesman Carl Friedrich Emil von Ibell.

During the First World War, he served from 1914 to July 1918 as a surgeon and staff physician on the Western and Eastern Fronts and in Italy. He experienced the end of the war "as militärischer Chefarzt" of a reserve hospital in the monastery. Michel recorded his experiences in a war diary, which he supplemented with more than 500 of his own drawings and watercolours. From 1919 to 1929, he was a member of the Koblenz city council. From 1927 until his retirement in 1947, he worked as head physician at the Evangelisches Stift. Between 1934 and 1944 - i.e. during the Nazi era - Michel carried out forced sterilisations. After the Second World War, he was not brought before a court, but merely classified as a fellow traveller by the denazification authorities.

In 1941, at the suggestion of his friend Paul Clemen, then director of the Art History Institute there and also the first provincial curator of the Prussian Rhine Province, he received an honorary degree from the Rheinische Friedrich-Wilhelms-Universität Bonn. On his 75th birthday on 17 September 1952, Lord Mayor Josef Schnorbach awarded him honorary citizenship of the city of Koblenz for his services to art and local history. The towns of Niederlahnstein and Oberlahnstein also named him an honorary citizen. In addition, a monument was erected in his honour in front of the Protestant Monastery of St. Martin in Koblenz in 1989, which was created by the sculptor Eberhard Linke.

Michel died on 30 October 1966 in Koblenz at the age of 89. He was buried in the Koblenz Main Cemetery.

Due to his attitude and deeds at the time of National Socialism, the Koblenz city council revoked the honorary citizenship for Michel on 15 May 2020. In June 2020, the Lahnstein city council also revoked his honorary citizenship; the Dr.- Michel-Straße, named after Fritz Michel, will not be renamed, as the name will henceforth refer to his father The renaming of Koblenz's Fritz-Michel-Straße was rejected by the city council despite the withdrawal of honorary citizenship. No decision has yet been made on what to do with the memorial located in front of the Evangelisches Stift hospital.

== Work as a historian and art historian ==
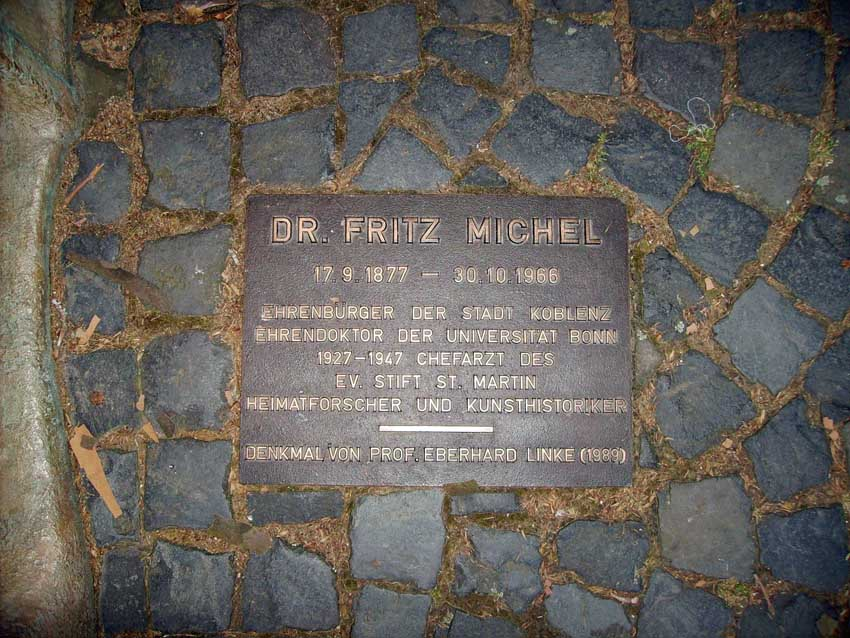
Commemorative plaque

Michel was mainly active in regional and local history, especially in the Middle Rhine region. Another focus was on the cities of Lahnstein and Koblenz. Michel often conducted basic research.

As a schoolboy, he came into contact with local history through the headmaster of his grammar school, Simon Widmann. He not only taught him how to read medieval manuscripts, but also got him a holiday job at the archives of the town of Niederlahnstein, where he sorted files and did the first preliminary work for his later History of Niederlahnstein. His first publication on the history of Niederlahnstein and Oberlahnstein dates from 1895, his first contribution to the regional history journal Nassauische Annalen from 1898.

According to Kampmann, history and art history served Michel as a counterbalance to his work in the hospital. Over the years, more than one hundred publications were produced. "The scale of his fields of interest ranged from the Allerheiligenberg near Lahnstein to the cultural history of the Basilica of St. Castor at Koblenz, from the administration of the city during the French period to the Ehrenburg feud and from Eltz Castle to the extensive collection of the art monuments of the city of Koblenz on 584 pages." Especially the two volumes on the art monuments of the city of Koblenz are valuable today in that they document the condition before the destruction in World War II (and during the subsequent reconstruction, to which many damaged but actually rebuildable buildings finally fell victim). His entire estate in the Landeshauptarchiv Koblenz comprises about ten shelf metres with 303 files and several hundred photos.

== Honours ==
- 1941: Ehrendoktor of the Faculty of Philosophy at the University of Bonn
- 1952: Verdienstorden der Bundesrepublik Deutschland (Steckkreuz) of the Federal Republic of Germany
- 1952: Honorary citizenship of the city of Koblenz (retrieved 5 June 2021)
- 1954: Honorary citizenship of Niederlahnstein (retrieved 5 June 2021)
- 1961: Honorary citizenship of Oberlahnstein (retrieved 5 June 2021)
- ca. 1970/71: Naming of a street in Neuendorf in Fritz-Michel-Straße
- 1989: Erection of a monument near the main entrance of the hospital Evangelisches Stift St. Martin

== Work ==
- Zur Geschichte der Sporkenburg, 1900.
- Die Herren von Helfenstein, 1906.
- Das ehemalige Jesuitenkolleg zu Coblenz und seine Bauten, 1919.
- Burg Eltz und ihre Besitzer. In: Zeitschrift für Heimatkunde des Regierungsbezirkes Coblenz, issue 13 January 1921 Online-Ausgabe dilibri Rheinland-Pfalz
- Geschichte von Oberlahnstein, 1925.
- Der Ehrenbreitstein, 1933.
- Die kirchlichen Denkmäler der Stadt Koblenz, 1937 (Die Kunstdenkmäler der Rheinprovinz 20,1).
- Die Florinskirche in Koblenz, 1939.
- St. Kastor Koblenz, 1939.
- Zur Geschichte der geistlichen Gerichtsbarkeit und Verwaltung der Trierer Erzbischöfe im Mittelalter, 1953.
- Die Kunstdenkmäler der Stadt Koblenz, 1954 (Die Kunstdenkmäler von Rheinland-Pfalz).
- Geschichte der Stadt Niederlahnstein, 1954.
- Übersicht über die Geschichte von St. Goar und Burg Rheinfels, 1956.
- Forst und Jagd im alten Erzstift Trier, 1958.
- Der Verkehr auf dem Rhein im Mittelalter, 1960.
- Geschichte der Stadt Koblenz im Mittelalter, 1963.
- Collaboration: Die Kunstdenkmäler des Landkreises Koblenz, 1944 (Die Kunstdenkmäler der Rheinprovinz 16.3).
