= Hans Roehrig =

German fighter ace and Knight's Cross recipient (1919–1943)

- Born: 4 November 1919; Hindenburg, Upper Silesia
- Died: 13 July 1943 (aged 23) near Siracusa, Sicily
- Cause of death: Killed in action
- Military career
- Allegiance: Nazi Germany
- Branch: Luftwaffe
- Service years: 1939–1943
- Rank: Hauptmann (captain)
- Unit: Erpr.Gr. 210, JG 53
- Conflicts: World War II: Eastern Front; Western Front
- Awards: Knight's Cross of the Iron Cross

Hans Roehrig (Note: German sources predominately spell his name as Roehrig, without the Umlaut which would otherwise render his name as Röhrig.) (4 November 1919 – 13 July 1943) was a former German Luftwaffe fighter ace and recipient of the Knight's Cross of the Iron Cross during World War II. Roehrig was credited with 75 aerial victories, 56 of which on the Eastern Front and 19 on the Western Front in the Mediterranean theatre. In November 1942, Roehrig was appointed Staffelkapitän (squadron leader) of 9. Staffel (9th squadron) of Jagdgeschwader 53 (JG 53—53rd Fighter Wing). Leading the unit during the campaigns in Tunisia and Sicily, he was shot down and killed in action on 13 July 1943 in the area of Syracuse.

== Early life and career ==
Roehrig was born on 4 November 1919 in Hindenburg in the Province of Upper Silesia, present-day Zabrze, Poland. He joined the military service of the Luftwaffe and after flight and fighter pilot training, (Note: Flight training in the Luftwaffe progressed through the levels A1, A2 and B1, B2, referred to as A/B flight training. A training included theoretical and practical training in aerobatics, navigation, long-distance flights and dead-stick landings. The B courses included high-altitude flights, instrument flights, night landings, and training to handle the aircraft in difficult situations.) Roehrig was posted to Erprobungsgruppe 210, an operational test unit flying the Messerschmitt Bf 110 in a fighter-bomber and ground-attack capacity. With this unit, he flew fighter-bomber missions over England during the Battle of Britain.

== Fighter pilot career ==
In early May 1941, Roehrig was promoted to Leutnant (second lieutenant) and transferred to 3. Staffel (3rd squadron) of Jagdgeschwader 53 (JG 53—53rd Fighter Wing). At the time, the Staffel was commanded by Hauptmann Werner Ursinus and subordinated to I. Gruppe (1st group) of JG 53 headed by Hauptmann Hans-Heinrich Brustellin. The Gruppe had just received the Messerschmitt Bf 109 F variant and was based at Crécy-en-Ponthieu.

In preparation of Operation Barbarossa, the German invasion of the Soviet Union, JG 53 arrived in Mannheim-Sandhofen on 8 June 1941 where the aircraft were given a maintenance overhaul. On 12 June, the Geschwader began its relocation east, with I. Gruppe moving to Krzewica, located approximately 70 kilometers (43 miles) west of Brest. Here, JG 53 was subordinated to Luftflotte 2 (Air Fleet 2) and was deployed on the right flank of Army Group Centre.

Following the German advance, the Gruppe reached an airfield at Hostynne on 30 June. Here on 4 July, Roehrig sustained minor injuries during a takeoff accident when his Bf 109 F-2 (Werknummer 6726—factory number) flipped over at the airfield. In support of the Panzer-Gruppe 1 (Panzer Group 1), I. Gruppe moved to an airfield at Bila Tserkva, located approximately 130 kilometers (81 miles) southwest of Kiev, on 21 July. Here on 25 July, Roehrig claimed his first aerial victory when he shot down an Ilyushin DB-3 bomber. Roehrig claimed three further aerial victories during the Battle of Uman before the Gruppe was withdrawn from the Eastern Front on 7 August, returning to Mannheim-Sandhofen. There, the Gruppe was replenished and received factory new Bf 109 F-4 aircraft.

In December, I. Gruppe of JG 53 was moved to the Mediterranean theatre at Gela in Sicily. Here, Roehrig flew missions during the Siege of Malta but was unable to add any further victory during this time. In early May 1942, I. Gruppe handed its aircraft over to those units staying in Sicily and relocated to Schwäbisch Hall. There, the Gruppe was equipped with a full complement of factory new Bf 109 F-4.

=== Back on the Eastern Front ===
In support of Case Blue, the 1942 strategic summer offensive in southern Russia, I. Gruppe of JG 53 began its relocation to the Eastern Front on 28 May 1942, arriving at Kursk that evening. Based at Kursk for the next three weeks, I. Gruppe supported the 4th Panzer Army in its drive towards Voronezh. The first combat missions were flown on 31 May in the vicinity northeast of Kursk. On 30 June 1942, Roehrig engaged in aerial combat with Soviet fighters east of Kshensky. In this engagement, his Bf 109 F-4 trop (Werknummer 10234—factory number) took a hit in the cabin, injuring Roehrig. On 6 August, Roehrig was shot down in his Bf 109 G-2 (Werknummer 13480) and sustained minor injuries. His victor may have been the Soviet ace Starshiy Leytenant Mikhail Baranov (183 IAP, 269 IAD) flying a Yakovlev Yak-1 fighter. (Note: IAP—Istrebitelny Aviatsionyy Polk (Fighter Aviation Regiment—Истребительный Авиационный Полк); IAD—Istrebitelny Aviatsionnaya Diviziya (Fighter Aviation Division—истребительная авиационная дивизия)) At that time, Roehrig was credited with 10 aerial victories. While descending in his parachute, he was shot at by Soviet fighters. On 20 September, Roehrig became an "ace-in-a-day" when he claimed five aerial victories.

On 28 September 1942, I. Gruppe was withdrawn from the Eastern Front and ordered to Munich-Riem where they would be reequipped with the Bf 109 G-2 trop for redeployment in the Mediterranean theater. Roehrig was awarded the Knight's Cross of the Iron Cross (Ritterkreuz des Eisernen Kreuzes) on 2 October 1942 for 51 aerial victories claimed.

=== Malta, North Africa and Sicily ===
On 10 October, I. Gruppe of JG 53 moved to Comiso Airfield in Sicily. The following day, the Gruppe flew its first combat missions during the Siege of Malta. Flying a fighter escort mission on 12 October, Roehrig claimed two Supermarine Spitfire fighters shot down over Malta. These were the first claims of the Gruppe in this theater. When British forces launched the Second Battle of El Alamein on 23 October, elements of I. Gruppe of JG 53 were ordered to North Africa.

In November 1942, Roehrig was appointed Staffelkapitän (squadron leader) of 9. Staffel of JG 53. He replaced Oberleutnant Franz Götz who had been appointed Gruppenkommandeur (group commander) of III. Gruppe of JG 53, a Gruppe to which 9. Staffel was subordinated. He successfully led the unit during the campaigns in Tunisia and Sicily. On 18 May 1943, Roehrig claimed a Lockheed P-38 Lightning twin-engine fighter aircraft shot down 70 kilometers (43 miles) northwest of Trapani. That day, the Western Allies had begun an air offensive in preparation for Operation Corkscrew, the invasion of Pantelleria, attacking airfields in Sicily and Sardinia. Returning from this attack, United States Army Air Forces (USAAF) P-38 fighters from the 14th Fighter Group and Luftwaffe fighters from both Jagdgeschwader 27 (JG 27—27th Fighter Wing) and III. Gruppe of JG 53, engaged in aerial combat. In this encounter, Luftwaffe pilots claimed eleven aerial victories for the loss of one Bf 109 shot down, the pilot escaping unhurt. The USAAF pilots claimed five Bf 109s shot down, further claiming to have damaged five other German aircraft, for the loss of four of their own, one pilot became a prisoner of war, one was killed in action and two were reported as missing in action.

On 9 July 1943, the Western Allies launched Operation Husky, the Allied invasion of Sicily. In aerial combat with USAAF P-38 fighters from the 1st Fighter Group on 11 July, Roehrig claimed two P-38 aircraft shot down, his last two claims. He claimed his first P-38 of the day at 11:25 in a location 15 kilometers (9.3 miles) south of Pachino, and a second P-38 at 13:15 10 kilometers (6.2 miles) southwest Catania.

Two days later on 13 July 1943, Roehrig led 9. Staffel of JG 53 on a fighter escort missions for Junkers Ju 52 transport aircraft to drop Fallschirmjäger on the Catania plains. That day, he was last seen 15 kilometers (9.3 miles) west of Augusta. Roehrig was shot down and killed in action in aerial combat by Supermarine Spitfire fighters in his Bf 109 G-4 trop (Werknummer 15063) in the area of Syracuse. Roehrig was succeeded by Oberleutnant Franz Barten as commander of 9. Staffel. Posthumously, Roehrig was promoted to Hauptmann (captain) on 1 September 1943.

== Summary of career ==
=== Aerial victory claims ===
According to US historian David T. Zabecki, Roehrig was credited with 75 aerial victories. Spick also lists him with 75 aerial victories claimed in an unknown number of missions. This figure is made up of approximately 50 aerial victories on the Eastern Front, the remaining aerial victories were claimed over the Western Allies in the Meditareanean theater and includes one four-engine heavy bomber. Mathews and Foreman, authors of Luftwaffe Aces — Biographies and Victory Claims, researched the German Federal Archives and found records for 74 aerial victory claims, plus one further unconfirmed claim. This figure includes 58 aerial victories on the Eastern Front and another 16 over the Western Allies, including one four-engined bomber.

Victory claims were logged to a map-reference (PQ = Planquadrat), for example "PQ 4927". The Luftwaffe grid map (Jägermeldenetz) covered all of Europe, western Russia and North Africa and was composed of rectangles measuring 15 minutes of latitude by 30 minutes of longitude, an area of about 360 square miles (930 km^{2}). These sectors were then subdivided into 36 smaller units to give a location area 3 km × 4 km (1.9 mi × 2.5 mi) in size.

Chronicle of aerial victories
This and the ♠ (Ace of spades) indicates those aerial victories which made Roehrig an "ace-in-a-day", a term which designates a fighter pilot who has shot down five or more airplanes in a single day. This and the – (dash) indicates unconfirmed aerial victory claims for which Roehrig did not receive credit. This and the ? (question mark) indicates information discrepancies listed by Prien, Stemmer, Rodeike, Bock, Mathews and Foreman.
Claim	Date	Time	Type	Location	Claim	Date	Time	Type	Location
– 3. Staffel of Jagdgeschwader 53 – Operation Barbarossa — 22 June – 7 August 1941
1	25 July 1941	18:50	DB-3		3	3 August 1941	14:45	I-16	
2	30 July 1941	13:40	I-153	northeast of Bila Tserkva	4	3 August 1941	14:50	V-11 (Il-2)	east of Pervomaisk
– 3. Staffel of Jagdgeschwader 53 – Eastern Front — 28 May – 27 September 1942
5	5 June 1942	12:40	I-61 (MiG-3)		32	11 September 1942	16:07	Pe-2	PQ 4927; 15 km (9.3 mi) east of Stalingrad
6	30 June 1942	10:40	Boston	8 km (5.0 mi) east of Kschen	33	12 September 1942	06:02? (Note: According to Mathews and Foreman claimed at 06:07.)	La-5	PQ 4941; 15 km (9.3 mi) southeast of Stalingrad
7	31 July 1942	13:58	Il-2	PQ 3915; 25 km (16 mi) northwest of Kalach	34	12 September 1942	16:50	La-5	PQ 4941; 15 km (9.3 mi) southeast of Stalingrad
8	31 July 1942	14:10	Il-2	PQ 3919 vicinity of Kalach	35	12 September 1942	16:57	La-5	PQ 4929; 40 km (25 mi) east of Stalingrad
9	5 August 1942	11:24	MiG-1	PQ 38161; 20 km (12 mi) east-northeast of Kotelnikovo	36	13 September 1942	09:35	P-40	PQ 49164 vicinity of Grebenka
10	6 August 1942	06:15	MiG-3	PQ 39891 vicinity of Aksay	37	13 September 1942	15:46	LaGG-3	PQ 4941; 15 km (9.3 mi) southeast of Stalingrad
11	13 August 1942	10:12	LaGG-3	east of Stalingrad	38	14 September 1942	16:07? (Note: According to Mathews and Foreman claimed at 10:57.)	LaGG-3	PQ 49471; 10 km (6.2 mi) east of Stalingrad
12	20 August 1942	16:04	I-180 (Yak-7)	PQ 49592; 50 km (31 mi) south of Stalingrad	39	14 September 1942	16:48? (Note: According to Mathews and Foreman claimed at 16:46.)	LaGG-3	PQ 49472; 10 km (6.2 mi) east of Stalingrad
13	20 August 1942	16:07	I-180 (Yak-7)	PQ 49532; 30 km (19 mi) south of Stalingrad	40	18 September 1942	10:55	Il-2	PQ 4057; 20 km (12 mi) north-northeast of Stalingrad
14	21 August 1942	14:40	LaGG-3	PQ 4941; 15 km (9.3 mi) southeast of Stalingrad	41	18 September 1942	15:20	Yak-1	PQ 4913; 10 km (6.2 mi) north of Grebenka
15	22 August 1942	12:30	Pe-2	PQ 5913; 50 km (31 mi) east-northeast of Stalingrad	42	18 September 1942	15:29	Yak-1	PQ 4053; 65 km (40 mi) north of Grebenka
16	23 August 1942	12:20	MiG-1	PQ 4927; 15 km (9.3 mi) east of Stalingrad	43	19 September 1942	09:27	Yak-1	PQ 49132; 10 km (6.2 mi) north of Grebenka
17	24 August 1942	12:10	LaGG-3	PQ 4927; 15 km (9.3 mi) east of Stalingrad	44	19 September 1942	09:32? (Note: According to Mathews and Foreman claimed at 09:30.)	Yak-1	PQ 49132; 10 km (6.2 mi) north of Grebenka
18	28 August 1942	08:12? (Note: According to Mathews and Foreman claimed at 08:10.)	P-40	PQ 4943; 40 km (25 mi) east-southeast of Stalingrad	45	19 September 1942	09:33? (Note: According to Mathews and Foreman claimed at 09:32.)	Yak-1	PQ 49122; 15 km (9.3 mi) north of Gumrak
19	29 August 1942	09:17	MiG-1	PQ 3946; 20 km (12 mi) southwest of Bassargino	46	19 September 1942	13:55	Yak-1	PQ 49432; 35 km (22 mi) east of Stalingrad
20	2 September 1942	14:55	Il-2	PQ 4918 vicinity of Bassargino	47♠	20 September 1942	09:15	Yak-1	PQ 4913; 10 km (6.2 mi) north of Grebenka
21	4 September 1942	13:45	Il-2	PQ 4954	48♠	20 September 1942	11:55	P-40	PQ 4943; 40 km (25 mi) east-southeast of Stalingrad
22	4 September 1942	13:50	Il-2	PQ 4956	49♠	20 September 1942	12:15	LaGG-3	PQ 4929; 40 km (25 mi) east of Stalingrad
23	8 September 1942	11:55	Il-2	PQ 5933; 80 km (50 mi) east of Stalingrad	50♠	20 September 1942	14:03? (Note: According to Mathews and Foreman claimed at 14:40.)	Yak-1	PQ 4945; 30 km (19 mi) southeast of Stalingrad
24	8 September 1942	16:40	Yak-1	PQ 4075	51♠	20 September 1942	14:12? (Note: According to Mathews and Foreman claimed at 14:52.)	Yak-1	PQ 4943; 40 km (25 mi) east-southeast of Stalingrad
25	8 September 1942	17:10? (Note: According to Mathews and Foreman claimed at 17:16.)	U-2	PQ 5063; 75 km (47 mi) north of Pitomnik Airfield	52	22 September 1942	16:27	Yak-1	PQ 4922; 25 km (16 mi) east-northeast of Stalingrad
26	9 September 1942	10:50	Il-2	PQ 4055; 55 km (34 mi) north of Gumrak	53	23 September 1942	09:18	Yak-1	PQ 4078; 20 km (12 mi) north of Gumrak
27	9 September 1942	10:53	Il-2	PQ 4055; 55 km (34 mi) north of Gumrak	54	23 September 1942	09:21? (Note: According to Mathews and Foreman claimed at 09:20.)	Yak-1	PQ 4075; 30 km (19 mi) north of Gumrak
28	9 September 1942	17:45	Il-2	PQ 4043; 40 km (25 mi) east-southeast of Stalingrad	55	23 September 1942	16:26	Yak-1	PQ 4078; 30 km (19 mi) north of Gumrak
29	10 September 1942	08:34	Yak-1	PQ 4928; 25 km (16 mi) east of Stalingrad	56	24 September 1942	16:35	Yak-1	PQ 4079; 15 km (9.3 mi) north of Grebenka
30	10 September 1942	15:45	I-180 (Yak-7)	PQ 4945; 30 km (19 mi) southeast of Stalingrad	57	25 September 1942	13:52? (Note: According to Mathews and Foreman claimed at 13:58.)	Yak-1	PQ 49263; 35 km (22 mi) east of Stalingrad
31	11 September 1942	05:30	LaGG-3	PQ 4991; 15 km (9.3 mi) southeast of Stalingrad	58	25 September 1942	14:02	Yak-1	PQ 49264; 35 km (22 mi) east of Stalingrad
– 3. Staffel of Jagdgeschwader 53 – Mediterranean Theater — 1 October – 31 December 1942
59	12 October 1942? (Note: According to Mathews and Foreman claimed on 14 October 1942.)	11:07	Spitfire	Malta	60	12 October 1942? (Note: According to Mathews and Foreman claimed on 18 October 1942.)	11:08	Spitfire	Malta
– 9. Staffel of Jagdgeschwader 53 – Mediterranean Theater — 1 January – 13 July 1943
? (Note: According to Prien, Stemmer, Rodeike and Bock, this claim is attributed to Leutnant Walter Hicke and not to Roehrig.)	24 January 1943	07:42	Spitfire		68	25 June 1943	12:06	B-17	Strait of Messina
61? (Note: This claim is not listed by Mathews and Foreman.)	29 January 1943	11:33	Boston	30 km (19 mi) northeast of Bizerte	69	4 July 1943	13:15	B-25	15 km (9.3 mi) south of Gela
62	18 May 1943	14:08	P-38	20 km (12 mi) northwest of Trapani	70	6 July 1943	15:15	Spitfire	5 km (3.1 mi) east of Capo Passero
63	19 May 1943	14:25	P-38	southeast of Sant'Antioco	—	9 July 1943	—	P-40	
64	22 May 1943	16:15	P-38	15 km (9.3 mi) south-southeast of Marettimo	71	9 July 1943	14:34	Boston	4 km (2.5 mi) south of Gela
65	5 June 1943	15:09	B-25	60 km (37 mi) south-southwest of Porto Palo	72	10 July 1943	19:35	Spitfire	5 km (3.1 mi) northeast of Syracuse
66	7 June 1943	06:45	P-40	7 km (4.3 mi) east of Cape Bon	73	11 July 1943	11:25	P-38	15 km (9.3 mi) south of Pachino
67	13 June 1943	13:24	P-39	30 km (19 mi) north-northeast of Pantellaria	74	11 July 1943	13:15	P-38	10 km (6.2 mi) southwest Catania

=== Awards ===
- Iron Cross (1939) 2nd and 1st Class
- Honor Goblet of the Luftwaffe (Ehrenpokal der Luftwaffe) on 26 October 1942 as Leutnant and pilot
- Knight's Cross of the Iron Cross on 2 October 1942 as Leutnant and Staffelkapitän of the 9./Jagdgeschwader 53 (Note: According to Scherzer as pilot in the III./Jagdgeschwader 53.)
