= Jürgen Harder =

German World War II fighter pilot (1918–1945)

- Born: 13 June 1918; Swinemünde in Pomerania
- Died: 17 February 1945 (aged 26) near Strausberg, Germany
- Burial place: Cemetery St. Marien in Strausberg
- Relatives: Harro Harder
- Military career
- Allegiance: Nazi Germany
- Branch: Luftwaffe
- Service years: 1939–1945
- Rank: Major (major)
- Unit: JG 53
- Commands: JG 11
- Conflicts: See battles World War II: Mediterranean Theatre; Allied Invasion of Sicily; Defense of the Reich
- Awards: Knight's Cross of the Iron Cross with Oak Leaves

Jürgen Harder (13 June 1918 – 17 February 1945) was a German military aviator and wing commander in the Luftwaffe during World War II. As a fighter ace, he was credited with 64 enemy aircraft shot down claimed in approximately 500 combat missions. He claimed 17 aerial victories on the Eastern Front and 47 over the Western Allies, including nine four-engined heavy bombers.

Born in Swinemünde, Harder joined the Luftwaffe of Nazi Germany in 1939. Following flight training, he was posted to Jagdgeschwader 53 (JG 53—53rd Fighter Wing) in March 1941. He claimed his first aerial victory on 22 June 1941, the first day of Operation Barbarossa, the German invasion of the Soviet Union. His unit was transferred to the Mediterranean Theatre in November 1941. In February 1942, Harder was appointed Staffelkapitän (squadron leader) of 7. Staffel (7th squadron) of JG 53 and Gruppenkommandeur (group commander) of I. Gruppe (1st group) of JG 53 a year later. In January 1945, Harder was appointed Geschwaderkommodore (wing commander) of Jagdgeschwader 11 (JG 11—11th Fighter Wing) and awarded the Knight's Cross of the Iron Cross with Oak Leaves on 1 February 1945. Less than three weeks later on 17 February, he was killed in a flying accident near Strausberg when his aircraft suffered engine failure.

== Career ==
Harder was born on 13 June 1918 in Swinemünde in the Province of Pomerania within the German Empire, present-day Świnoujście, Poland. Harder had two brothers Harro and Rolf. Harro also was a fighter pilot and was killed in action on 12 August 1940, Rolf served with the artillery and was killed in April 1943. On 1 October 1939, Harder joined the military service of the Luftwaffe as a Fahnenjunker (cadet) and was trained as a fighter pilot. (Note: Flight training in the Luftwaffe progressed through the levels A1, A2 and B1, B2, referred to as A/B flight training. A training included theoretical and practical training in aerobatics, navigation, long-distance flights and dead-stick landings. The B courses included high-altitude flights, instrument flights, night landings and training to handle the aircraft in difficult situations. For pilots destined to fly multi-engine aircraft, the training was completed with the Luftwaffe Advanced Pilot's Certificate (Erweiterter Luftwaffen-Flugzeugführerschein), also known as the C-Certificate.) On 1 February 1941, Harder was promoted to Leutnant (second lieutenant) and in March was posted to the Gruppenstab (headquarters unit) of III. Gruppe (3rd group) of Jagdgeschwader 53 (JG 53—53rd Fighter Wing). (Note: According to Dixon, Harder was promoted to Leutnant (second lieutenant) on 1 April 1941.) While flying with the Gruppenstab, Harder made a crash landing in his Messerschmitt Bf 109 F-2 (Werknummer 8085—factory number) at the Maldegem Airfield. Two days later, his aircraft sustained damage in aerial combat with Royal Air Force (RAF) Supermarine Spitfire fighters over the English Channel.

=== War against the Soviet Union ===
On 8 June 1941, the bulk of JG 53's air elements moved via Jever, in northern Germany, to Mannheim-Sandhofen. There the aircraft were given a maintenance overhaul prior to moving east. On 12 June, III. Gruppe was ordered to transfer to a forward airfield at Sobolewo. On 21 June, the Geschwaderkommodore (wing commander) of JG 53 and its Gruppenkommandeure were summoned to nearby Suwałki, where Generalfeldmarschall (field marshal) Albert Kesselring gave the final instructions for the upcoming attack. Hauptmann Wolf-Dietrich Wilcke, the Gruppenkommandeur of III. Gruppe, briefed his pilots that evening.

On 22 June, the Geschwader crossed into Soviet airspace in support of Operation Barbarossa, the invasion of the Soviet Union, which opened the Eastern Front. III. Gruppe took off on its first mission at 3:20 am with the Gruppenstab (headquarters unit) and 7. Staffel targeting Soviet airfields at Alytus and Oranji. Thad day, Harder claimed his first aerial victory, shooting down an I-17 fighter, an early war designation for the Mikoyan-Gurevich MiG-1.

On 25 September, Harder got disoriented and his Bf 109 F-2 (Werknummer 9212) ran out of fuel resulting in an emergency landing near Novgorod. In early October, III. Gruppe was withdrawn from the Eastern Front, relocating to Mannheim-Sandhofen. The air elements left on 4 October with the ground elements travelling by train, arriving in Mannheim-Sandhofen on 13 October.

=== Mediterranean theater ===
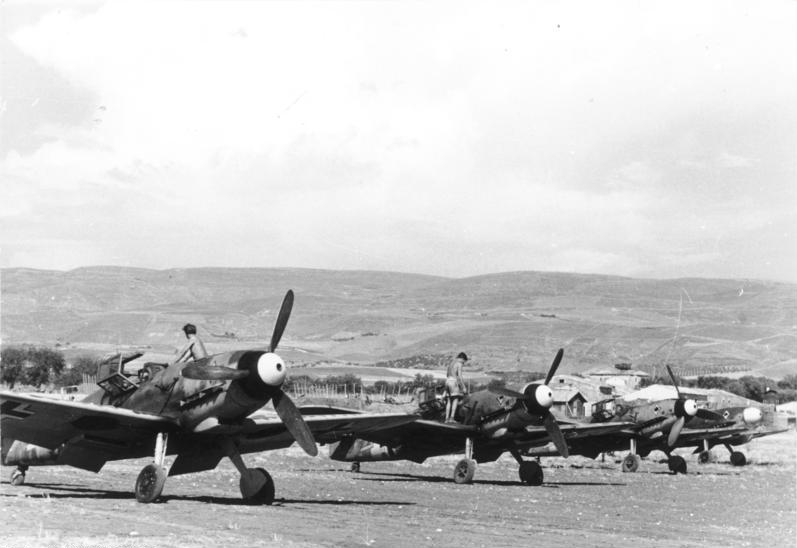
Messerschmitt Bf 109G's of JG 53 in southern Italy

At Mannheim-Sandhofen, III. Gruppe was equipped with the then new Bf 109 F-4. On 8 November, the Gruppe moved to Husum in northern Germany where they stayed until 14 November. They were then ordered to relocate to the Mediterranean theater in Sicily. The ground elements arrived at Catania Airfield on 28 November followed by the air elements two days later. On 13 October, Harder claimed a Curtiss P-40 Warhawk fighter on a morning escort mission for Junkers Ju 87 dive bombers. Later that day, he claimed a second P-40 shot down.

On 12 January 1943, Harder was awarded the German Cross in Gold (Deutsches Kreuz in Gold) and promoted to Oberleutnant (first lieutenant) on 1 February. On 3 February, Harder received news that his wife had given birth on 30 January to their daughter Elke. Two days later, Harder was appointed Staffelkapitän (squadron leader) of 7. Staffel of JG 53. He replaced Hauptmann Wilfried Pufahl who was transferred. From 25 May onwards, Harder only led the Staffel from the ground while in the air they were initially led by Leutnant Franz Barten and from July by Leutnant Walter Hicke. Harder had been taken off combat duty following the death of his younger brother Rolf in April.

On 22 March, Harder claimed his first heavy bomber when he shot down a Boeing B-17 Flying Fortress bomber from a force of 24 B-17s, escorted by 40 fighter aircraft, on mission heading for Palermo. On 8 May, 8. Staffel flew from Sciacca on escort mission for three military transports heading for Tunesia without engaging in combat. Later that day east of Cape Bon, Harder claimed two Spitfire fighters shot down. Together with Franz Schieß, Harder was promoted to the rank of Hauptmann (captain) on 1 September 1943.

=== Group commander ===
On 22 January 1944, Allied forces launched the amphibious landing Operation Shingle, also known as the Battle of Anzio. In an attempt to contain the Allied beachhead at Anzio and Nettuno, German forces moved available forces into the combat area. In consequence, III. Gruppe relocated to Orvieto near Lake Bolsena on 24 January. In this combat area on 7 February, Harder claimed his 40th in total and first aerial aerial victory after he was again allowed to fly operationally over a Spitfire near Lake Albano. On 12 February, III. Gruppe moved to a makeshift airfield at Arlena di Castro located southeast of Lake Bolsena. Escorting German ground attack aircraft on 14 February, Harder shot down a Lockheed P-38 Lightning. The following day, Harder was informed that he had been appointed Gruppenkommandeur of I. Gruppe of JG 53, replacing Major Friedrich-Karl Müller who was transferred. Prior to taking his new command, Harder met with Oberst Günther Freiherr von Maltzahn, the Jagdfliegerführer Oberitalien (Fighter Leader Northern Italy), in Udine where he received more specific orders. Command of his 7. Staffel then went to Oberleutnant Rolf Klippen. At the time, I. Gruppe was based at Maniago.

The United States Army Air Forces (USAAF) Fifteenth Air Force attacked Regensburg on 25 February. I. Gruppe intercepted the bombers north of Laibach, present-day Ljubljana. In the resulting aerial combat fought between 11:25 and 12:05, Harder shot down one of the Consolidated B-24 Liberator bombers near Klagenfurt. However, his wingman Oberleutnant Horst Torrau was shot down and is missing in action since. In early March, a soldier of 2. Staffel, a squadron of Harder's I. Gruppe, was killed in a fight with residents of Maniago. In an act of retaliation, a flight of 2. Staffel made multiple strafing attacks on Maniago during a training exercise. Whether Harder was aware of the plans prior to the attack remains unknown. Harder however was summoned by the Geschwaderkommodore Oberstleutnant Helmut Bennemann to report on the incident.

On 25 April, Harder attacked a four-engined bomber formation and shot one of them down and rammed another after his aircraft was damaged thereby claiming his aerial victories number 49 and 50. Elements of JG 53 had been scrambled at 11:00 and intercepted a flight of approximately 30 B-24s at 11:30 west of Forlì. Harder shot down one of the B-24s and rammed a second. He bailed out of his Bf 109G-6 (Werknummer 162717) near Casentino, spraining his ankle and breaking his wrist. On 1 May, Harder was promoted to Major (major).

On 4 January 1945, Harder claimed his 64th and last aerial victory when he shot down a Lavochkin La-5 fighter. Shortly after, he was ordered to Berlin where he met with Reichsmarschall Hermann Göring. The purpose of the meeting was to present Harder with the Knight's Cross of the Iron Cross with Oak Leaves (Ritterkreuz des Eisernen Kreuzes mit Eichenlaub). However, expressed his concerns about the technical superiority of the Allied aircraft to Göring. This infuriated Göring to the point that Harder was yelled at and accused of incompetence. Harder was then released and sent back to his unit where he arrived on 16 January without the Oak Leaves. On 21 January, Harder was again ordered to Berlin to take command Jagdgeschwader 11 (JG 11—11th Fighter Wing). The next day, Harder left I. Gruppe of JG 53. Command of the Gruppe was temporarily given to Hauptmann Wolfgang Ernst, then to Hauptmann Erich Hartmann, before Hauptmann Helmut Lipfert officially took command on 15 February.

=== Wing commander and death ===
In late January 1945, Harder took command of JG 11 as appointed Geschwaderkommodore. He replaced Major Günther Specht who had been killed in action on 1 January during Operation Bodenplatte. On 12 January, Soviet forces launched the Vistula–Oder offensive on the Eastern Front. In consequence on 21 January, JG 11 moved to Strausberg, located 30 kilometers (19 miles) east of Berlin, where they arrived on 23 January. For his 64th aerial victory, Harder was then awarded the Oak Leaves to his Knight's Cross on 1 February 1945. He was the 727th member of the German armed forces to be so honored. In early February, JG 11 predominately flew ground support missions in the area of Kienitz, present-day part of Letschin, where Soviet forces had created the first bridgehead across the Oder.

On 17 February, Harder and his wingman Leutnant Hans Jung flew an aerial reconnaissance mission over the Oder. During the landing approach at Werneuchen, Jung observed Harder's Bf 109 G-14/AS (Werknummer 784738) going into an unexplainable steep dive, crashing into the ground and killing Harder. Technical experts later analyzed the wreckage and came to the conclusion that engine failure had caused the accident. The piston of cylinder 12 had penetrated the engine block, escaping toxic fumes thus intoxicated Harder who then lost control of the aircraft. Command of JG 11 was then given to Major Anton Hackl who took command on 22 February.

== Summary of career ==
=== Aerial victory claims ===
According to US historian David T. Zabecki, Harder was credited with 64 aerial victories.Obermaier also lists him with 64 aerial victories, 17 over the Eastern Front and 47 in the Mediterranean theater and Western Allies, including nine four-engined heavy bombers. Mathews and Foreman, authors of Luftwaffe Aces – Biographies and Victory Claims, researched the German Federal Archives and state that he was credited with more than 56 aerial victories, plus one further unconfirmed claim. This figure includes at least 12 aerial victories on the Eastern Front and 44 over the Western Allies, including ten four-engined heavy bombers.

Victory claims were logged to a map-reference (PQ = Planquadrat), for example "PQ 14 Ost N/LH-4". The Luftwaffe grid map (Jägermeldenetz) covered all of Europe, western Russia and North Africa and was composed of rectangles measuring 15 minutes of latitude by 30 minutes of longitude, an area of about 360 square miles (930 km^{2}). These sectors were then subdivided into 36 smaller units to give a location area 3 km × 4 km (1.9 mi × 2.5 mi) in size.

Chronicle of aerial victories
This and the – (dash) indicates unconfirmed aerial victory claims for which Harder did not receive credit. This and the ? (question mark) indicates information discrepancies listed by Prien, Stemmer, Rodeike, Bock, Mathews and Foreman.
Claim	Date	Time	Type	Location	Claim	Date	Time	Type	Location
– Stab III. Gruppe of Jagdgeschwader 53 – Operation Barbarossa — 22 June – 4 October 1941
1	22 June 1941	16:45	I-17 (MiG-1)		6	27 August 1941	13:47	R-5	
2	25 June 1941	11:36	DB-3? (Note: According to Mathews and Foreman claimed as a Tupolev SB-3.)		7	8 September 1941	09:55	DB-3	Chernigov/Nizhyn
3	14 July 1941	16:55	I-16	Smolensk	8	9 September 1941	09:05	R-5	
4	14 July 1941	16:56	I-16	Smolensk	9	9 September 1941	14:25	I-16	south of Chernigov
5	30 July 1941	19:25	I-17 (MiG-1)		10? (Note: According to Mathews and Foreman claimed with 9. Staffel of Jagdgeschwader 53.)	26 September 1941	11:40	V-11 (Il-2)	southwest of Klimowka
– Stab III. Gruppe of Jagdgeschwader 53 – Mediterranean Theater, Sicily — 25 November 1941 – April 1942
11	18 March 1942? (Note: According to Mathews and Foreman claimed on 10 March 1942.)	17:15	Spitfire						
– 7. Staffel of Jagdgeschwader 53 – Mediterranean Theater, Sicily — April – May 1942
12	30 April 1942	11:30	Spitfire	east of Malta	13	18 May 1942	12:55	Spitfire	25 km (16 mi) south of Ħal Far
—	30 April 1942	—	Spitfire	vicinity of Malta					
– 7. Staffel of Jagdgeschwader 53 – Mediterranean Theater, North Africa — May – 31 December 1942
14	30 May 1942	16:17	P-40	east of Ain el Gazala	23	13 October 1942	09:35	P-40	
15	31 May 1942	18:52	P-40	west of El Adem	24	13 October 1942	17:55? (Note: According to Mathews and Foreman claimed at 17:05.)	P-40	
16	11 June 1942	16:25	Hurricane	west of El Adem	25	19 October 1942	12:16	P-40	7 km (4.3 mi) north of El Dabaa
17	14 June 1942	11:25	P-40		26	20 October 1942? (Note: According to Mathews and Foreman claimed on 21 October 1942 as a Hawker Hurricane.)	14:10	P-40?	5 km (3.1 mi) southeast of Abu Dweis
18	27 September 1942	10:45	Boston	northwest of Cairo	27	21 October 1942? (Note: According to Mathews and Foreman claimed on 20 October 1942 as a Curtiss P-40 Warhawk.)	11:57	Hurricane?	7 km (4.3 mi) northwest of El Alamein
19	9 October 1942	09:15	P-40		28	22 October 1942	10:27? (Note: According to Mathews and Foreman claimed at 10:37.)	P-40	20 km (12 mi) southeast of Quotaifiya
20	9 October 1942	09:25	P-40		29	26 October 1942	09:57	P-40	10 km (6.2 mi) northeast of Fukah
21	9 October 1942	16:20	P-40		30	12 November 1942? (Note: According to Mathews and Foreman claimed at 9 November 1942.)	14:00	Spitfire	3 km (1.9 mi) north of Oued Zarga
22	9 October 1942	16:23? (Note: According to Mathews and Foreman claimed at 16:20.)	P-40		31	22 November 1942	16:44	Spitfire	20 km (12 mi) southwest of Béja
– Stab III. Gruppe of Jagdgeschwader 53 – Mediterranean Theater, Sicily — January – February 1943
32	30 January 1943	09:13? (Note: According to Mathews and Foreman claimed at 08:33.)	Spitfire	15 km (9.3 mi) southeast of Capo Passero	33	8 February 1943	10:38	Spitfire	30 km (19 mi) south of Santa Croce Camerina
– 7. Staffel of Jagdgeschwader 53 – Mediterranean Theater — February – 25 May 1943
34	22 March 1943	15:55	B-17	10 km (6.2 mi) north of Cape San Vito	37	9 May 1943	13:25	B-17	20 km (12 mi) northwest of Capo Gallo
35	8 May 1943	18:40? (Note: According to Mathews and Foreman claimed at 18:55.)	Spitfire	7 km (4.3 mi) southeast of Zembra	38	10 May 1943	13:55? (Note: According to Mathews and Foreman claimed at 13:50.)	P-38	8 km (5.0 mi) north of Marettimo; 25 km (16 mi) southwest of Trapani
36	8 May 1943	18:43	Spitfire	5 km (3.1 mi) northeast of Zembra vicinity of Cape Bon	39	21 May 1943	11:12	B-17	45 km (28 mi) southwest of Granitola Toretta
– 7. Staffel of Jagdgeschwader 53 – Mediterranean Theater, Italy — 1 January – 18 February 1944
40	7 February 1944	11:55	Spitfire	2 km (1.2 mi) south of Lake Albano	41	14 February 1944	11:17	P-38	20 km (12 mi) south of Rome
– Stab III. Gruppe of Jagdgeschwader 53 – Mediterranean Theater, Italy — 18 February – May 1944
42	25 February 1944	11:47	B-24	PQ 14 Ost N/LH-4 south of Villach	47	7 April 1944	13:08	P-38	10 km (6.2 mi) southeast of Treviso vicinity of Folvizio
43	18 March 1944	09:54	B-17	PQ 14 Ost N/MJ-5	48	18 April 1944	15:02	P-47	PQ 14 Ost N/NF-2/6 southwest of Udine
44	28 March 1944	12:05	P-47	PQ 14 Ost S/AG-4; Fano	49	25 April 1944	11:35	B-24	PQ 14 Ost N/UD-8; 30 km (19 mi) southwest of Forlì
45	28 March 1944	12:06	P-47	PQ 14 Ost S/AG-4; Fano	50	25 April 1944	12:11? (Note: According to Mathews and Foreman claimed at 12:10.)	B-24	80 km (50 mi) east of Florence; 50 km (31 mi) south Faenza
46	2 April 1944	12:16	B-24	PQ 14 Ost N/MK-9					
– Stab III. Gruppe of Jagdgeschwader 53 – Mediterranean Theater, Romania — May – 27 August 1944
51	28 June 1944	10:08	B-24	PQ 24 Ost UM-4 southwest of Bucharest	57? (Note: This claim is not listed by Mathews and Foreman.)	18 August 1944	—	P-51	
52	28 June 1944	10:17	P-51	PQ 24 Ost UN-4 west of Bucharest	58?	20 August 1944	—	Yak-9	
53	3 July 1944	12:07	P-51	PQ 24 Ost UL-9; Blejești	59?	20 August 1944	—	Il-2	
54	4 July 1944	10:24	B-24	PQ 24 Ost SK-4 southwest of Costești	60?	20 August 1944	—	Yak-9	
55?	4 August 1944	—	P-51		61?	21 August 1944	—	Yak-9	
56?	4 August 1944	—	P-51		62?	22 August 1944	08:54	Yak-9	PQ 24 Ost 7884
– Stab III. Gruppe of Jagdgeschwader 53 – Eastern Front, Hungary — September 1944 – 22 January 1945
63	11 December 1944	12:35	Il-2		64	4 January 1945? (Note: According to Mathews and Foreman claimed on 14 January 1945.)	—	La-5	

=== Awards ===
- Iron Cross (1939) 2nd and 1st Class
- Honor Goblet of the Luftwaffe on 16 November 1942 as Leutnant and pilot
- German Cross in Gold (12 January 1943) (Note: According to Obermaier on 8 February 1943.)
- Knight's Cross of the Iron Cross with Oak Leaves
  - Knight's Cross on 5 December 1943 as Hauptmann and Staffelkapitän in the III./Jagdgeschwader 53 (Note: According to Scherzer as Oberleutnant and Staffelführer in the III./Jagdgeschwader 53.)
  - 727th Oak Leaves on 1 February 1945 as Major and Geschwaderkommodore of the Jagdgeschwader 11

== Notes ==
Military offices
Preceded by Major Günther Specht	Commander of Jagdgeschwader 11; January 1945 – 17 February 1945	Succeeded by Major Anton Hackl
