= Capo Passero Lighthouse =

Lighthouse in Italy

Capo Passero
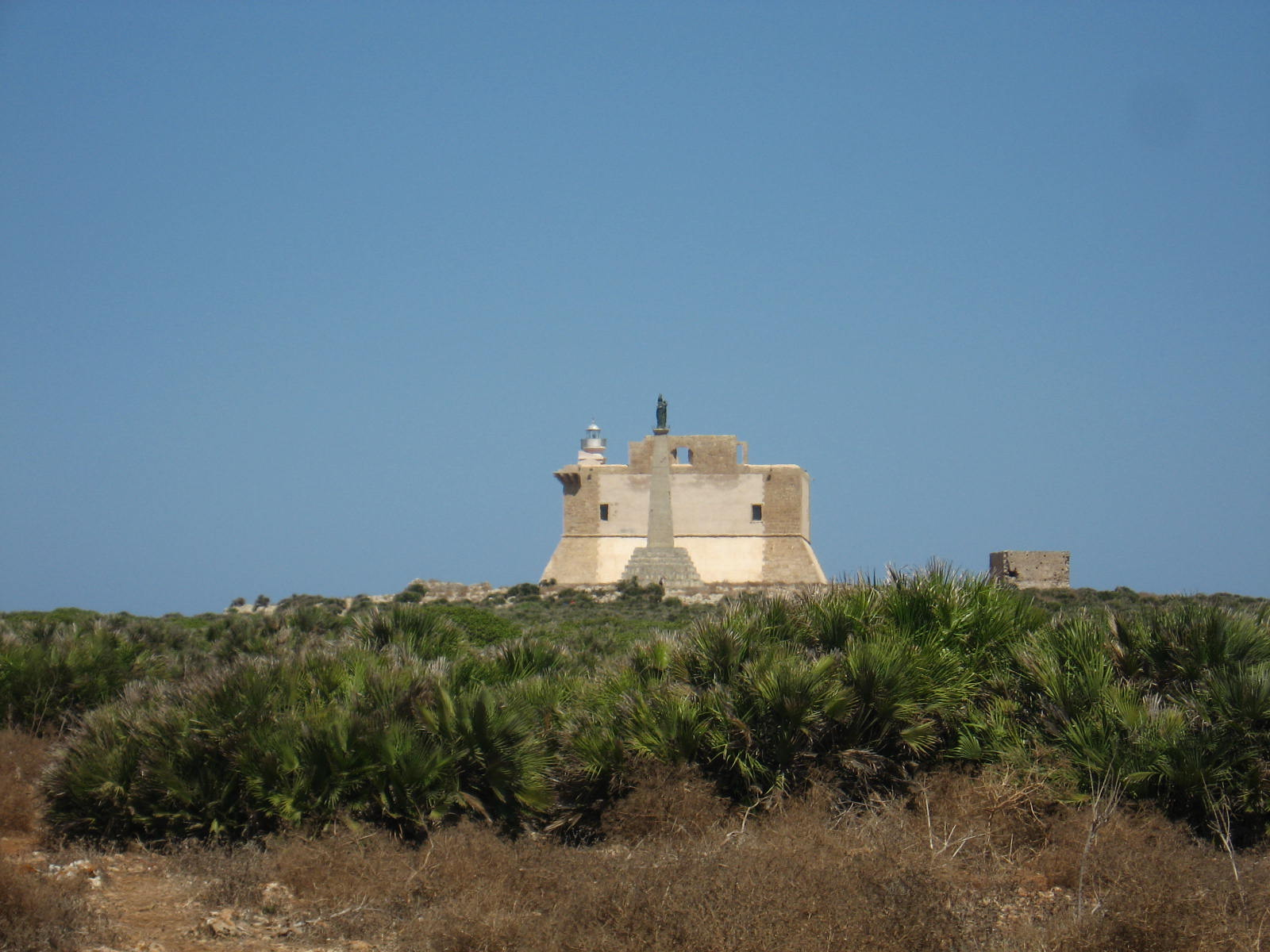
- Capo Passero Lighthouse
- Location: Isola di Capo Passero; Portopalo di Capo Passero; Sicily
- Coordinates: 36°41′19″N 15°09′06″E

Tower
- Constructed: 1871
- Construction: masonry tower
- Height: 11 metres (36 ft)
- Shape: cylindrical tower with balcony and lantern atop a massive fort
- Markings: white tower, grey metallic lantern dome
- Power source: solar power
- Operator: Marina Militare

Light
- Focal height: 39 metres (128 ft)
- Lens: Type OF
- Range: 11 nautical miles (20 km; 13 mi)
- Characteristic: Fl (2) W 10s.
- Italy no.: 2922 E.F.

Capo Passero Lighthouse (Italian: Faro di Capo Passero) is an active lighthouse located on the Isola di Capo Passero, the extreme south-eastern tip of Sicily.

== Description ==
The lighthouse was built in 1871 and consists of a white cylindrical tower, 11 feet (3.4 m) high, with balcony and lantern, mounted on the north-east corner of a large fort. The lantern, painted in grey metallic, is positioned at 39 metres (128 ft) above sea level and emits two white flashes in a 10 seconds period, visible up to a distance of 11 nautical miles (20 km; 13 mi). The lighthouse is completely automated, powered by a solar unit and is operated by the Marina Militare with the identification code number 2922 E.F.

== See also ==
- List of lighthouses in Italy
- Capo Passero
