= Franz Götz (pilot) =

German World War II flying ace

- Born: 28 January 1913; Obertsrot in the district of Rastatt, Grand Duchy of Baden, German Empire
- Died: 4 May 1980 (aged 67); Aschaffenburg, Bavaria, West Germany
- Military career
- Allegiance: Nazi Germany; West Germany
- Branch: Luftwaffe; German Air Force
- Rank: Major (Wehrmacht); Oberst (Bundeswehr)
- Units: JG 53, JG 26
- Commands: 9./JG 53, III./JG 53, JG 26
- Conflicts: World War II
- Awards: Knight's Cross of the Iron Cross, German Cross in Gold, and Honour Goblet of the Luftwaffe

Franz Götz (28 January 1913 – 4 May 1980) was a German Luftwaffe military aviator and wing commander during World War II. As a fighter ace, he is credited with 63 enemy aircraft shot down in 766 combat missions. The majority of his victories were claimed over the Western Front, including five four-engined bombers, with nineteen claims over the Eastern Front.

Born in Obertsrot, Grand Duchy of Baden, Götz grew up in the Weimar Republic and Nazi Germany and volunteered for military service in the Reichswehr. In 1935, he transferred to the Luftwaffe (Air Force). Following flight training, he was transferred to Jagdgeschwader 53 (JG 53—53rd Fighter Wing). Following the outbreak of World War II, he claimed his first aerial victory on 14 May 1940 during the Battle of France. In September 1940, during the Battle of Britain, he was appointed Staffelkapitän (squadron leader) of the 9. Staffel (9th squadron) of JG 53. Götz then fought in the aerial battles of Operation Barbarossa, the German invasion of the Soviet Union and in September 1941, he relocated with his group to the Mediterranean Theater. Fighting in this theater of operations, he was awarded the Knight's Cross of the Iron Cross on 4 September 1942 and was appointed Gruppenkommandeur (group commander) of the III. Gruppe (3rd group) of JG 53 in October 1942. In January 1945, Götz became the last Geschwaderkommodore (wing commander) of Jagdgeschwader 26 "Schlageter". Following World War II, he reentered military service in the Bundeswehr and became an officer in the Bundesluftwaffe. He died on 4 May 1980 in Aschaffenburg, Bavaria.

== Early life and career ==
Götz was born on 28 January 1913 in Obertsrot, present-day part of Gernsbach, at the time in the Grand Duchy of Baden of the German Empire. In 1935, he transferred from the Reichswehr to the newly emerging Luftwaffe where he was trained as a fighter pilot. On 26 September 1939, Jagdgeschwader 53 (JG 53—53rd Fighter Wing) was ordered to form its III. Gruppe (3rd group). Leadership of the Gruppe was given to Hauptmann Werner Mölders at Wiesbaden–Erbenheim Airfield. Formation of the 7. Staffel (7th squadron) was headed by Oberleutnant Wolf-Dietrich Wilcke and Götz was assigned to this squadron holding the rank of Oberfeldwebel (master sergeant). At the time, the Gruppe was equipped with the Messerschmitt Bf 109 E.

== World War II ==
World War II in Europe had begun on Friday, 1 September 1939, when German forces invaded Poland. From 2–16 January 1940, Götz and other pilots from III. Gruppe went on a ski vacation to Vorarlberg (Austria). On 11 March 1940, he became witness to Wilcke's second aerial victory which was claimed near the "three-nations-corner" north of Metz during the "Phoney War" period of World War II. The Battle of France, the German invasion of France and the Low Countries, began on 10 May 1940. On 14 May, he engaged in aerial combat with French Morane-Saulnier M.S.406 fighters and claimed one of the aircraft shot down. On 26 May, III. Gruppe moved to an airfield at Lor. The next day, Götz claimed an aerial victory over a M.S.406 shot down 10 kilometres (6.2 miles) south of Creil. His wingman Unteroffizier Ernst Poschenrieder also filed claim for this French aircraft, but the claim was later credited to Götz.

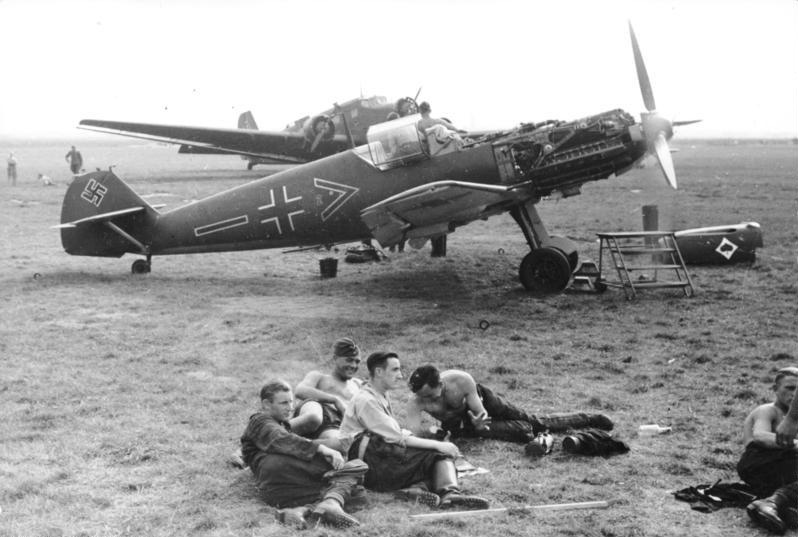
A Bf 109 E-1 of JG 53, similar to those flown by Götz at the time.

On 5 June, German forced launched Fall Rot (Case Red), the second phase of the conquest of France. That day, Götz claimed his fourth aerial victory, a Potez 63 destroyed over the Noyon-Compiègne combat area. The following day, III. Gruppe engaged in combat with twelve French Bloch MB.152 fighters near Soissons. For the loss of one pilot taken prisoner of war, four aerial victories were claimed by III. Gruppe pilots, including one of which credited to Götz. On 9 June, Army Group A began its attack on Rethel and Soissons in an attempt to cross the Aisne. In support of this attack, Götz claimed a Curtiss P-36 Hawk fighter shot down near Rethel and Attigny. On 10 and 11 June, JG 53 flew multiple combat missions in the combat area of the Aisne near Reims. There on 11 June, Götz claimed his last aerial victory during the Battle of France when he shot down a MB.152 fighter aircraft.

During the Battle of Britain, Götz claimed his seventh aerial victory on 8 September 1940 after he was promoted to Oberleutnant (first lieutenant) and assigned to the 9. Staffel. That day, JG 53 escorted bombers to London and he was credited with shooting down a Royal Air Force (RAF) Hawker Hurricane fighter. At the time, 9. Staffel was under the command of Oberleutnant Jakob Stoll. On 15 September, also known as the Battle of Britain Day, Götz shot down another Hurricane during III. Gruppe's second mission of the day when they encountered approximately 25 to 30 RAF fighters near Tonbridge. Two days later, II. and III. Gruppe of JG 53 flew missions over southeast England where they engaged in combat with RAF fighters from No. 501, No. 41 and No. 611 Squadron. During this encounter, Stoll was shot down and posted as missing in action. In consequence, Götz was appointed Staffelkapitän of 9. Staffel. The next day, JG 53 flew three bomber escort missions to London. That day, Götz was credited with his ninth aerial victory when he shot down a Supermarine Spitfire fighter. On 14 November, Götz was awarded the Honor Goblet of the Luftwaffe (Ehrenpokal der Luftwaffe).

III. Gruppe was withdrawn from the Channel Front on 19 December and moved to Mönchengladbach. There, the Gruppe was replenished while the pilots were sent on a skiing holiday until late January 1941. They then received a full complement of Bf 109 F-2 aircraft. The pilots continued to train and familiarize themselves with this new aircraft before on 18 March, III. Gruppe was again ordered to the English Channel where they were based at Berck-sur-Mer. On 7 May, Götz claimed a Spitfire shot down near Dover during an afternoon mission. This was his last claim at the English Channel.

=== Operation Barbarossa ===
On 8 June 1941, the bulk of JG 53's air elements moved via Jever, in northern Germany, to Mannheim-Sandhofen. There the aircraft were given a maintenance overhaul prior to moving east. On 12 June, III. Gruppe was ordered to transfer to a forward airfield at Sobolewo. On 21 June, the Geschwaderkommodore (wing commander) of JG 53 and its Gruppenkommandeure were summoned to nearby Suwałki, where Generalfeldmarschall (field marshal) Albert Kesselring gave the final instructions for the upcoming attack. Wilcke, who had been appointed Gruppenkommandeur of III. Gruppe on 12 August 1940, briefed his pilots that evening.

On 22 June, the Geschwader crossed into Soviet airspace in support of Operation Barbarossa, the invasion of the Soviet Union, which opened the Eastern Front. That late afternoon, Götz claimed a Kochyerigin DI-6 shot down. On 25 June, III. Gruppe had moved to Vilna and Götz claimed the destruction of a Tupolev SB bomber. By 25 July, III. Gruppe had moved to a forward airfield at Wjardina. The next day, Götz was credited with four aerial victories, a Petlyakov Pe-2 and three Ilyushin DB-3 bombers.

III. Gruppe began returning to Germany in early October 1941. The air elements left the Soviet Union on 4 October, while the ground units were transported back by train to Mannheim on 13 October. Since 22 June 1941, III. Gruppe had claimed 769 aerial victories for the loss of 6 pilots killed, 7 missing in action, 2 captured and 12 wounded. Following the return, he received the German Cross in Gold (Deutsches Kreuz in Gold), awarded on 15 October 1941.

=== North Africa, Malta and Italy ===
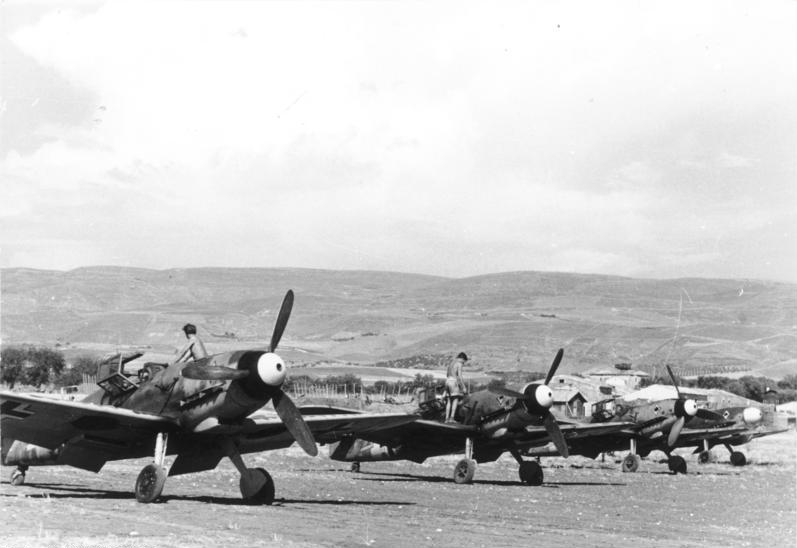
Messerschmitt Bf 109G's of JG 53 in southern Italy

After its return to Germany, III. Gruppe was deployed to the Mediterranean Theater. The ground elements of III. Gruppe arrived in Catania in Sicily on 28 November 1941 while the rest of the Gruppe arrived on 3 December. Three days later, III. Gruppe was ordered to move to Timimi in Libya. III. Gruppe relocated back to Sicily on 17 December for operations in the siege of Malta. The island of Malta had a strategically important position in the Mediterranean Sea. With the opening of a new front in North Africa in mid-1940, British air and sea forces based on the island could attack Axis ships transporting vital supplies and reinforcements from Europe to North Africa. To counter this threat, the Luftwaffe and the Regia Aeronautica (Italian Royal Air Force) conducted bombing raids to neutralize the RAF defenses and the ports.

On 20 May 1942, III. Gruppe was transferred from Sicily to North Africa where the Gruppe was initially based at Martuba Airbase and placed under the command of Major Erich Gerlitz. Götz claimed his first aerial victory in this theater on 10 June when he shot down a Spitfire in area of Bir Hakeim. He was awarded the Knight's Cross of the Iron Cross (Ritterkreuz des Eisernen Kreuzes) on 4 September 1942 after 40 aerial victories. On 27 October 1942, while the Second Battle of El Alamein was still raging, III. Gruppe was withdrawn from North Africa and flown out to Taranto. In the timeframe from 20 May to 27 October, the Gruppe had claimed 113 aerial victories for the loss of eleven pilots killed in action, two missing in action, four taken prisoner of war, and ten pilots wounded. Following the return from North Africa, III. Gruppe received 42 factory new Bf 109 G-4 trop, the first Gruppe of JG 53 to receive this aircraft. The Gruppe then moved to Sicily where they were based at Santo Pietro. There on 1 November, Götz claimed a Spitfire shot down 20 kilometres (12 miles) east of Gozo Sometime in November 1942, he then replaced Gerlitz as Gruppenkommandeur (group commander) of III. Gruppe of JG 53. Command of 9. Staffel was then passed on to Oberleutnant Hans Roehrig.

When on 18 August, Götz was promoted to Major (major) and sent on home leave, Oberleutnant Jürgen Harder was temporarily tasked with leading III. Gruppe on the ground while Oberleutnant Franz Schieß led in the air. Götz retook command of the Gruppe on 20 September. On 22 January 1944, Allied forces launched Operation Shingle, the amphibious landing in the area of Anzio and Nettuno. In defense of this attack, III. Gruppe was ordered to move from Villorba in northern Italy to Orvieto closer to the combat area. Götz claimed his last aerial victories in Italy on 26 May. On a reconnaissance mission north of Anzio, he was credited with two Spitfire fighters shot down near Marta. Three days later, III. Gruppe began its withdrawal from the Anzio combat area, arriving in Maniago on 2 June.

=== Defense of the Reich ===
On 28 June 1944, III. Gruppe arrived by train in Bad Lippspringe where they would be based for flying missions in Defense of the Reich. There, the Gruppe was assigned a number of inexperienced pilots directly coming from the Ergänungsgruppe, the supplementary training unit of JG 53. Over the next weeks, Götz and his squadron leaders further trained and prepared these pilots for their first combat missions. The Gruppe received a full complement of Bf 109 G-6 aircraft, most of them equipped with the 20 mm MG 151/20 underwing gun pod. Götz ordered these gun pods removed as the additional weight had an adverse effect on the handling qualities, reducing the Bf 109s performance in fighter-versus-fighter combat. He claimed a Boeing B-17 Flying Fortress bomber on 24 August 1944 over the Lüneburger Heide.

In preparation for Operation Bodenplatte, a failed attempt to gain air superiority during the stagnant stage of the Battle of the Bulge, the bulk of JG 53, with exception of III. Gruppe, was tasked with attacking the USAAF airfield at Metz-Frescaty Air Base. III. Gruppe was given the objective to attack the Étain Airfield, an airfield located approximately 45 km (28 mi) northwest of Metz. Götz briefed his pilots at the airfield in Kirrlach of the upcoming mission and its objectives on the evening 31 December 1944. Every pilot had to sign a "contract" stating that they would make at least three strafing attacks on the target. III. Gruppe took off at Kirrlach at 08:30 on 1 January 1945 with a Junkers Ju 88 guiding them to target. In the vicinity of Kaiserslautern, the Gruppe came under attack by Republic P-47 Thunderbolt fighters which shot down, or significantly damaged, twelve aircraft so that they had to make a forced landing, none of the pilots were killed in the encounter. In return, III. Gruppe pilots claimed one of the P-47 fighters shot down, plus a further probable destruction was filed. On 17 January 1945, Götz transferred command of III. Gruppe to Hauptmann Siegfried Luckenbach.

=== Wing commander of Jagdgeschwader 26 ===
On 28 January 1945, Götz was appointed Geschwaderkommodore of Jagdgeschwader 26 (JG 26—26th Fighter Wing), based at Fürstenau. He replaced Oberst Josef Priller who was transferred to a staff position with the Inspector of Fighters. According to Weal, Götz claimed seven aerial victories while flying with JG 26. Due to the deteriorating war situation, on 25 March, Götz was forced to disband III. Gruppe of JG 26 at Delmenhorst, the aircraft and pilots were split among the three remaining groups. Less than three weeks later, VI. Gruppe was ordered to disband at Stade on 9 April, the remaining operational aircraft were transferred to I. and II. Gruppe.

Emblem of JG 26

On 3 May 1945, the Geschwaderstab (headquarters unit) moved to Flensburg Airfield. The next day, the German surrender at Lüneburg Heath, the unconditional surrender of the German forces in the Netherlands, northwest Germany including all islands, in Denmark and all naval ships in those areas was signed. That evening, at 23:50, Generalfeldmarschall Robert Ritter von Greim, the newly appointed Commander-in-Chief of the Luftwaffe, ordered Götz to relocate JG 26 to either Prague or Norway, in order to continue fighting against the Soviet Union. On 4 May, II. Gruppe was based at Husum. The Gruppe was already without its commander, Haupmann Paul Schauder had been taken prisoner of war on 1 May. The pilots debated over von Greim's order. While half of them chose to remain at Husum and surrendered to the British, approximately ten pilots attempted to fly to Norway. However, most of them only reached Denmark due to lack of fuel. I. Gruppe, under the command of Major Karl Borris, surrendered on 6 May at Flensburg.

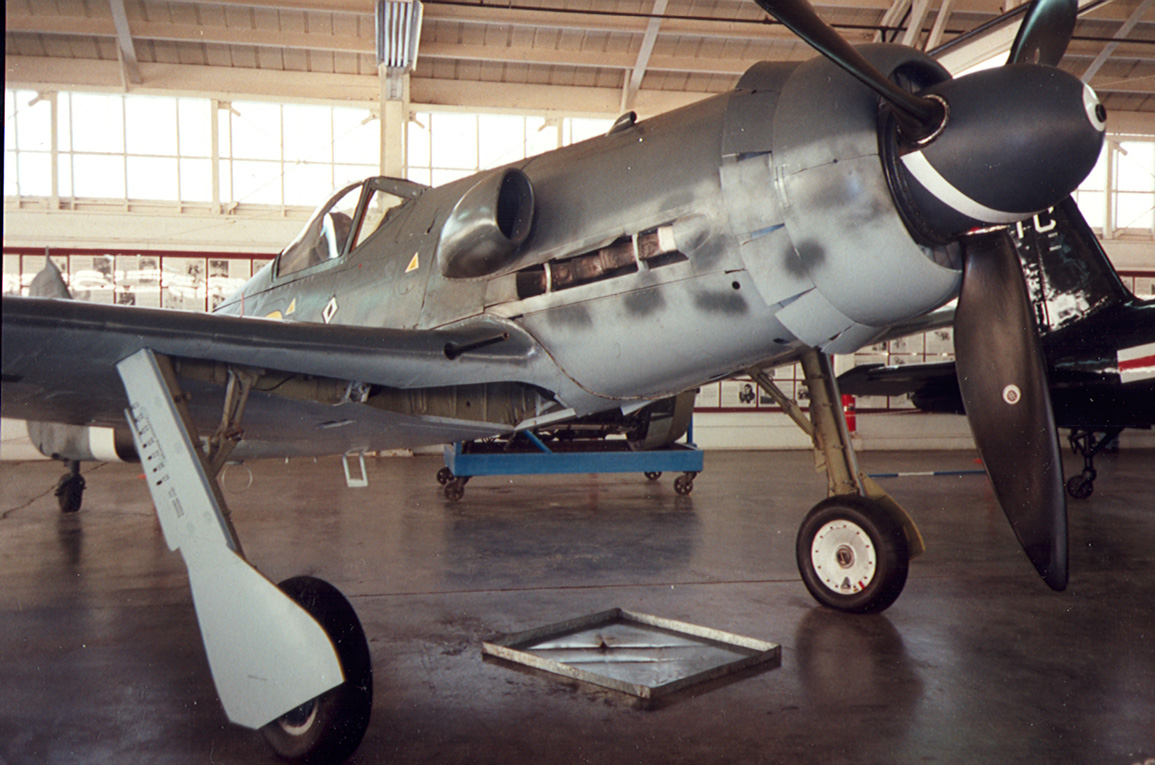
Fw 190 D-13/R11, "Yellow 10" from the Champlin Fighter Museum, Phoenix, Arizona, c. 1995.

Sometime in March 1945, Götz was assigned Focke-Wulf Fw 190 D-13/R11 "Yellow 10" (Werknummer 836017—factory number). This aircraft was surrendered to the British at Flensburg, in Northern Germany. Shortly after the war the British became interested in the performance and evaluation of the advanced German Fw 190 D-13. While at Flensburg the British Disarmament Wing wanted to see how this fighter would perform against one of their best, a Hawker Tempest. Squadron Leader Evans approached Major Heinz Lange and asked him to fly a mock combat against one of their pilots. Lange accepted, even though he had only 10 flights in a D-9. The mock dogfight was conducted at an altitude of 10,000 ft (3,000 m), with only enough fuel for the flight and no ammunition. In the end the machines were evenly matched. Lange assessed that the outcome of such a contest greatly depended on the skills of the individual pilot. At the time Lange was not aware that he was flying a D-13 but rather assumed a D-9. "Yellow 10" was further subjected to mock combat when on 25 June 1945 Oberleutnant Günther Josten was asked to fly a comparison flight against another Tempest. This very rare Fw 190 D-13/R11 is now on display at the Flying Heritage & Combat Armor Museum in Everett, Washington, which recently had its Junkers Jumo 213 engine made operable once more. However, it will not be flown again.

== Later life ==
Following World War II, Götz reentered military service in the Bundeswehr and became an officer in the Bundesluftwaffe. On 26 October 1963, Oberstleutnant Götz was part of a German delegation headed by the Bishop of Essen, Cardinal Franz Hengsbach, who attended a private audience held by Pope Paul VI. He retired from the Bundeswehr with the rank of Oberst (colonel) and died on 4 May 1980 in Aschaffenburg, Bavaria.

== Summary of career ==
=== Aerial victory claims ===
According to US historian David T. Zabecki, Götz was credited with 63 aerial victories. Obermaier also lists him with 63 aerial victories, claimed in 766 combat missions, 19 on the Eastern Front and 44 on the Western Front, including five four-engined bombers. Mathews and Foreman, authors of Luftwaffe Aces — Biographies and Victory Claims, researched the German Federal Archives and state that he claimed more than 55 aerial victories, plus two further unconfirmed claims. This figure of confirmed claims includes 21 aerial victories on the Eastern Front and over 34 on the Western Front, including at least three four-engined bombers. The alleged seven aerial victories claimed by Götz whilst flying with JG 26 cannot be verified via the German Federal Archives.

Victory claims were logged to a map-reference (PQ = Planquadrat), for example "PQ AO". The Luftwaffe grid map (Jägermeldenetz) covered all of Europe, western Russia and North Africa and was composed of rectangles measuring 15 minutes of latitude by 30 minutes of longitude, an area of about 360 square miles (930 km^{2}). These sectors were then subdivided into 36 smaller units to give a location area 3 km × 4 km (1.9 mi × 2.5 mi) in size.

Chronicle of aerial victories
This and the – (dash) indicates unconfirmed aerial victory claims for which Götz did not receive credit. This and the ? (question mark) indicates information discrepancies listed by Prien, Stemmer, Rodeike, Balke, Bock, Mathews and Foreman.
Claim	Date	Time	Type	Location	Claim	Date	Time	Type	Location
– 7. Staffel of Jagdgeschwader 53 – Battle of France — 10 May – 25 June 1940
—	14 May 1940	—	M.S.406	Sedan	3	6 June 1940	09:50	MB.152	southeast of Soissons
—	18 May 1940	—	Curtiss	west of Laon	4	9 June 1940	10:10	Curtiss	Rethel-Attigny
1	27 May 1940	14:12	M.S.406	10 km (6.2 mi) south of Creil	5	11 June 1940	11:55	MB.152	Reims
2	5 June 1940	14:30	Potez 63						
– 9. Staffel of Jagdgeschwader 53 – Battle of Britain and on the English Channel — 26 June 1940 – 7 June 1941
6	8 September 1940	13:35	Hurricane		9	30 September 1940	15:10	Spitfire	Hastings
7	15 September 1940	15:40	Hurricane		10	7 May 1941	16:53	Spitfire	east of Dover
8	18 September 1940	20:50	Spitfire						
– 9. Staffel of Jagdgeschwader 53 – Operation Barbarossa — 22 June – 4 October 1941
11	22 June 1941	18:28	DI-6		22	24 August 1941	15:49	SB-2	
12	25 June 1941	08:35	SB-3		23	27 August 1941	16:25	DB-3	
13	25 July 1941	14:35	Pe-2		24	27 August 1941	16:26	DB-3	
14	26 July 1941	05:17? (Note: According to Mathews and Foreman claimed at 05:15.)	Pe-2		25	31 August 1941	11:21	Il-2	east of Barok
15	26 July 1941	10:05	DB-3		26	8 September 1941	09:55	DB-3	
16	26 July 1941	17:55	DB-3		27	9 September 1941	10:30	Il-2	
17	26 July 1941	17:56	DB-3		28	10 September 1941	07:36? (Note: According to Mathews and Foreman claimed at 07:30.)	Il-2	
18	31 July 1941	06:50	I-153		29	15 September 1941	09:55	DB-3	
19	3 August 1941	08:19	I-18 (MiG-1)		30	20 September 1941	16:45	V-11 (Il-2)	
20	6 August 1941	11:55	Pe-2		31	25 September 1941	17:05	I-18 (MiG-1)	
21	22 August 1941	10:53	DB-3						
– 9. Staffel of Jagdgeschwader 53 – Mediterranean Theater — 25 November 1941 – 31 December 1942
32	9 May 1942	10:25	P-40		37	26 June 1942	10:30	Blenheim	20 km (12 mi) southeast of Sallum
33	12 May 1942	15:06	Spitfire		38	6 July 1942	12:31	Spitfire	
34	10 June 1942	07:50	Spitfire	north of Bir Hakeim	39	6 July 1942	12:37	Spitfire	
35	14 June 1942	11:05	Hurricane		40	22 July 1942	09:00	Spitfire	
36	15 June 1942	06:16	Beaufighter	110 km (68 mi) north-northeast of Ras el Tin	41	1 November 1942	16:27	Spitfire	20 km (12 mi) east of Gozo
– Stab III. Gruppe of Jagdgeschwader 53 – Mediterranean Theater — 1 January – 31 December 1943
42	17 April 1943	19:08	B-25	20 km (12 mi) north of Majaz al Bab	46	5 July 1943	11:40	B-17	30 km (19 mi) southwest of Augusta
43	11 May 1943	12:24	P-38	10 km (6.2 mi) west of Marsala	47	1 December 1943	12:51? (Note: According to Mathews and Foreman claimed at 12:50.)	P-38	20 km (12 mi) west of Livorno; 70 km (43 mi) south of La Spezia
44	18 May 1943	14:03	P-38	70 km (43 mi) northwest of Trapani	48	2 December 1943	12:06	P-38	30 km (19 mi) southeast of Venice
45	21 May 1943	11:15	P-38	50 km (31 mi) south of Granitola Torretta					
– Stab III. Gruppe of Jagdgeschwader 53 – Mediterranean Theater — 1 January – June 1944
49? (Note: This claim is not listed by Mathews and Foreman.)	16 January 1944	11:45	P-38		51	26 May 1944	09:48	Spitfire	PQ 14 Ost S/HD-2; Marta
50	12 April 1944	09:37	P-47	north of Rutigliano	52	26 May 1944	09:49	Spitfire	PQ 14 Ost S/GD-7; Marta
– Stab III. Gruppe of Jagdgeschwader 53 – Defense of the Reich — July – September 1944
53	3 August 1944	15:25	P-51	PQ 04 Ost BS-2; Calw, south of Pforzheim	55	22 August 1944	11:35	P-51	PQ 15 Ost AO
54	15 August 1944	12:52	B-24	PQ 05 Ost EN-7; Steenwijk	56	24 August 1944	11:15	B-17	PQ 15 Ost DA southwest of Lüneburg
According to Prien, Götz claimed two further four-engined bombers shot down on an unknown date.

=== Awards ===
- Iron Cross (1939) 2nd and 1st Class
- Honour Goblet of the Luftwaffe (14 November 1940)
- German Cross in Gold on 15 October 1941 as Oberleutnant in the 9./Jagdgeschwader 53
- Knight's Cross of the Iron Cross on 4 September 1942 as Oberleutnant and Staffelkapitän of the 9./Jagdgeschwader 53

== Notes ==
Military offices
Preceded by Oberst Josef Priller	Commander of Jagdgeschwader 26 "Schlageter"; 28 January 1945 – 7 May 1945	Succeeded by none
