= Franz Barten =

German flying ace (1912–1944)

- Born: 26 January 1912; Saarbrücken, German Empire
- Died: 4 August 1944 (aged 32) near Reinsehlen, Germany
- Cause of death: Killed in action
- Military career
- Allegiance: Nazi Germany
- Branch: Luftwaffe
- Rank: Hauptmann (captain)
- Units: JG 77, JG 51, JG 53
- Commands: 9./JG 53
- Conflicts: See battles World War II: Invasion of Poland; Battle of France; Battle of Britain; Eastern Front; Mediterranean theatre; Defense of the Reich †
- Awards: German Cross in Gold; Knight's Cross of the Iron Cross (posthumous)

Franz Barten (26 January 1912 – 4 August 1944) was a World War II fighter ace from Germany. He was born on 26 January 1912 at Saarbrücken. Barten was credited with having shot down a total of 52 Allied aircraft.

On 4 August 1944, Barten was shot down in a Messerschmitt Bf 109 in aerial combat with P-47 Thunderbolt belonging to the United States Army Air Forces near Reinsehlen. He bailed out of his aircraft, but was shot while hanging in his parachute.

== Early life and career ==
Barten was born on 26 January 1912 in Saarbrücken in the Rhine Province within the German Empire. Following flight training, (Note: Flight training in the Luftwaffe progressed through the levels A1, A2 and B1, B2, referred to as A/B flight training. A training included theoretical and practical training in aerobatics, navigation, long-distance flights and dead-stick landings. The B courses included high-altitude flights, instrument flights, night landings and training to handle the aircraft in difficult situations.) he was transferred to the 2. Staffel (2nd squadron) of Jagdgeschwader 77 (JG 77—77th Fighter Wing) on 1 July 1939. At the time, the Staffel was commanded by Oberleutnant Hannes Trautloft and subordinated to I. Gruppe (1st group) of JG 77 which was based at Breslau-Schöngarten.

== World War II ==
World War II in Europe had begun on Friday 1 September 1939 when German forces invaded Poland. In preparation for the invasion in end-August 1939, I. Gruppe of JG 77, to which the 2. Staffel was subordinated, had been moved from Breslau-Schöngarten to an airfield at Juliusburg, present-day Dobroszyce. The Gruppe operated over the left flank of Army Group South, supporting the 8th Army advance into Poland. Its main task was flying combat air patrols but had relatively little enemy contact. During the Battle of France, JG 77 was subordinated to I. Fliegerkorps (1st Air Corps) which was part of Luftflotte 3. I. Gruppe supported the 4th Army on the right wing of Army Group A during the attack on the Low Countries and France.

On 25 August 1940, I. Gruppe of JG 77 relocated from Wyk auf Föhr to Marquise located near the English Channel to fight in the Battle of Britain. Barten claimed his first aerial victory on 14 September. That day, I. Gruppe flew a combat air patrol in the area of Tonbridge. On this mission, the Gruppe claimed five aerial victories, including a Hawker Hurricane by Barten, for the loss of two of their own. On 17 October, I. Gruppe flew a mission over southeastern England and to London. That day, Barten claimed two Hurricanes shot down. On 21 November, I. Gruppe of JG 77 was redesignated and became the IV. Gruppe of Jagdgeschwader 51 (JG 51—51st Fighter Wing). Consequently, Barten became a member of 11. Staffel of JG 51. On 7 December, the Gruppe was withdrawn from the English Channel, relocating to Mannheim-Sandhofen Airfield for a period of rest and replenishment. On 9 February 1941, IV. Gruppe returned to France, then based at an airfield near Le Touquet. There, Barten claimed a Supermarine Spitfire fighter shot down on 15 April southeast of Boulogne.

=== Operation Barbarossa ===
On 15 June, IV. Gruppe of JG 51 began transferring east and was located at an airfield named Krzewicze, located approximately 70 kilometers (43 miles) west of Brest-Litovsk. On 22 June, German forces launched Operation Barbarossa, the German invasion of the Soviet Union. JG 51 was subordinated to II. Fliegerkorps (2nd Air Corps), which as part of Luftflotte 2 (Air Fleet 2). JG 51 area of operation during Operation Barbarossa was over the right flank of Army Group Center in the combat area of the 2nd Panzer Group as well as the 4th Army.

On 10 November 1942, Barten was injured when his Messerschmitt Bf 109 F-2 (Werknummer 12878—factory number) aircraft suffered engine failure, forcing him to bail out near Surazh.

=== Mediterranean theater ===
In May 1943, Barten was transferred to the III. Gruppe of Jagdgeschwader 53 (JG 53—53rd Fighter Wing) which was fighting in the Mediterranean theater. When Oberleutnant Jürgen Harder, the commander of 7. Staffel was banned from flying further combat operations, Barten was given the task of leading the Staffel in the air while Harden was leading from the ground. Harder's oldest brother Rolf had been killed in action in April, making Jürgen the last of three brothers. According to Luftwaffe regulations at the time, Jürgen had been withdrawn from flying combat operations. On 12 July during the Allied invasion of Sicily, Barten claimed a Spitfire fighter shot down 5 kilometers (3.1 miles) southeast of Ramacca.

On 13 July 1943, Barten was transferred and appointed Staffelkapitän (squadron leader) of the 9. Staffel of JG 53. He succeeded Oberleutnant Hans Roehrig who was killed in action that day. In consequence, the task of leading 7. Staffel in the air was then passed to Leutnant Walter Hicke. On 19 August, the United States Army Air Forces (USAAF) attacked Foggia. The Gruppe intercepted the Boeing B-17 Flying Fortress heavy bombers over Montecorvino Rovella. In this encounter, III. Gruppe pilots claimed six B-17 bombers shot down, including one by Barten near Salerno.

=== Defense of the Reich and death ===
On 28 June 1944, III. Gruppe arrived by train in Bad Lippspringe and initially subordinated to the 3. Jagd-Division (3rd Fighter Division) where they would be based for flying missions in Defense of the Reich. There, the Gruppe was assigned a number of inexperienced pilots directly coming from the Ergänungsgruppe, the supplementary training unit of JG 53. Over the next weeks, Barten and other experienced pilots further trained and prepared these pilots for their first combat missions. The Gruppe received a full complement of Bf 109 G-6 aircraft, most of them equipped with the 20 mm MG 151/20 underwing gun pod. The Gruppenkommandeur Franz Götz ordered these gun pods removed as the additional weight had an adverse effect on the handling qualities, reducing the Bf 109s performance in fighter-versus-fighter combat. The Gruppe flew its first operational mission on 28 July. That day, the United States Army Air Forces (USAAF) Eighth Air Force targeted German fuel production in central Germany.

On 4 August 1944, Barten was shot down in aerial combat with USAAF Republic P-47 Thunderbolt fighters near the Luftwaffe airfield at Reinsehlen. He bailed out of his Bf 109 G-6 (Werknummer 441575) but was then killed. According to records of the Deutsche Dienststelle (WASt), a German government agency which maintained records of who were killed in action, Barten fell to his death because his parachute failed to fully deploy after a low altitude bail-out. According to Weal, he was shot in his parachute by P-47 fighters. Posthumously, Barten was awarded the Knight's Cross of the Iron Cross (Ritterkreuz des Eisernen Kreuzes) on 24 October 1944 and also promoted to Hauptmann (captain). He was succeeded by Oberleutnant Martin von Vacano as commander of 9. Staffel.

== Summary of career ==
=== Aerial victory claims ===
According to US historian David T. Zabecki, Barten was credited with 52 aerial victories. Obermaier also lists him with 52 aerial victories, 39 of which on the Eastern Front, achieved in 895 combat missions. Mathews and Foreman, authors of Luftwaffe Aces — Biographies and Victory Claims, researched the German Federal Archives and found records for 52 aerial victory claims. This number includes four claims during the Battle of Britain, 39 on the Eastern Front, and nine in the Mediterranean Theater including three heavy bombers.

Victory claims were logged to a map-reference (PQ = Planquadrat), for example "PQ 47612". The Luftwaffe grid map (Jägermeldenetz) covered all of Europe, western Russia and North Africa and was composed of rectangles measuring 15 minutes of latitude by 30 minutes of longitude, an area of about 360 square miles (930 km^{2}). These sectors were then subdivided into 36 smaller units to give a location area 3 km × 4 km (1.9 mi × 2.5 mi) in size.

Chronicle of aerial victories
This and the ? (question mark) indicates information discrepancies listed by Prien, Stemmer, Rodeike, Bock, Mathews and Foreman.
| Claim | Date | Time | Type | Location | Claim | Date | Time | Type | Location |
– 2. Staffel of Jagdgeschwader 77 – Action at the Channel and over England — 25 August – 21 November 1940
| 1 | 14 September 1940 | 17:00 | Hurricane | | 3 | 17 October 40 | 18:05 | Spitfire | Tunbridge Wells |
| 2 | 17 October 1940 | 17:56 | Hurricane | south of Tunbridge Wells | | | | | |
– 11. Staffel of Jagdgeschwader 51 – Action at the Channel and over England — 21 November 1940 – 7 June 1941
| 4 | 15 April 1941 | 08:55 | Spitfire | southeast of Boulogne | | | | | |
– 11. Staffel of Jagdgeschwader 51 – Operation Barbarossa — 22 June – 5 December 1941
| 5 | 22 June 1941 | 16:10 | DB-3 | | 15 | 7 September 1941 | 17:12 | SB-2 | |
| 6 | 24 June 1941 | 09:38 | SB-3 | | 16 | 8 September 1941 | 05:30 | I-18 (MiG-1) | |
| 7 | 29 June 1941 | 18:38 | SB-2 | | 17 | 9 September 1941 | 12:55 | R-3 | |
| 8 | 4 July 41 | 14:50 | SB-2 | | 18 | 9 September 1941 | 13:00 | R-3 | |
| 9 | 11 July 1941 | 07:40 | ZKB-19? (Note: According to Mathews and Foreman claimed as a Ilyushin DB-3.) | | 19 | 10 September 1941 | 11:56 | R-3 | |
| 10 | 13 July 1941 | 12:24 | Pe-2 | | 20 | 6 October 1941 | 16:55 | I-18 (MiG-1) | |
| 11 | 15 July 1941 | 09:45 | I-16 | | 21 | 23 October 1941 | 15:20 | Yak-1? (Note: According to Mathews and Foreman claimed as a Yakovlev Yak-3.) | |
| 12 | 15 July 1941 | 16:20 | DB-3 | | 22 | 27 October 1941 | 14:20 | DB-3 | |
| 13 | 9 August 1941 | 12:05 | Pe-2 | | 23 | 12 November 1941 | 08:10 | SB-3 | |
| 14 | 27 August 1941 | 16:50 | Pe-2 | | 24 | 12 November 1941 | 08:11 | SB-3 | |
– 11. Staffel of Jagdgeschwader 51 – Eastern Front — 6 December 1941 – 30 April 1942
| 25 | 4 February 42 | 12:55 | I-18 (MiG-1) | | 30 | 21 March 42 | 07:40 | Pe-2 | |
| 26 | 13 February 42 | 12:45 | I-18 (MiG-1) | | 31 | 1 April 42 | 10:55 | MiG-3 | |
| 27 | 18 February 42 | 12:47 | I-18 (MiG-1) | | 32 | 6 April 42 | 07:20 | Pe-2 | |
| 28 | 19 February 42 | 14:00 | I-61 (MiG-3) | | 33 | 6 April 42 | 14:35 | MiG-3 | |
| 29 | 18 March 42 | 14:12 | I-18 (MiG-1) | | | | | | |
– 11. Staffel of Jagdgeschwader 51 – Eastern Front — 1 May – August 1942
| 34 | 30 May 42 | 05:40 | MiG-3 | | 38 | 3 August 42 | 06:50 | Il-2 | PQ 47612; 20 km (12 mi) northeast of Rzhev |
| 35 | 13 July 42 | 09:35 | LaGG-3 | | 39 | 4 August 42 | 12:14 | Il-2 | PQ 36291; 5 km (3.1 mi) west of Konaja |
| 36 | 2 August 42 | 11:55 | LaGG-3 | PQ 47551; 15 km (9.3 mi) north-northwest of Rzhev | 40 | 5 August 42 | 06:10 | LaGG-3 | PQ 47662; 15 km (9.3 mi) south of Staritsa |
| 37 | 2 August 42 | 17:45 | LaGG-3 | PQ 47522; 20 km (12 mi) north-northwest of Rzhev | 41 | 5 August 42 | 06:20 | Il-2 | PQ 47852; 15 km (9.3 mi) southeast of Zubtsov |
– 11. Staffel of Jagdgeschwader 51 – Eastern Front — April 1943
| 42 | 8 April 43 | 15:40 | Il-2 | PQ 35 Ost 45521; 15 km (9.3 mi) northeast of Utrikowo | 43 | 8 April 43 | 15:42 | Il-2 | PQ 35 Ost 45342; 25 km (16 mi) north of Spas-Demensk |
– 7. Staffel of Jagdgeschwader 53 – Mediterranean Theater — July 1943
| 44 | 12 July 43 | 18:28 | Spitfire | 5 km (3.1 mi) southeast of Ramacca | | | | | |
– 9. Staffel of Jagdgeschwader 53 – Mediterranean Theater — 13 July – 31 December 1943
| 45 | 19 August 43 | 12:33 | B-17 | east of Salerno | 48 | 3 September 43 | 13:53 | B-24 | 5 km (3.1 mi) west of Villa Literno |
| 46 | 20 August 43 | 12:32? (Note: According to Mathews and Foreman claimed at 12:22.) | P-38 | 2 km (1.2 mi) east of Castel Volturno | 49 | 1 December 43 | 12:48 | P-38 | 40 km (25 mi) south of La Spezia |
| 47 | 28 August 43 | 15:48? (Note: According to Mathews and Foreman claimed at 15:25.) | P-38 | 50 km (31 mi) southeast of Fondi | 50 | 28 December 43 | 11:45 | B-24 | 32 km (20 mi) south-southwest of Padua |
– 9. Staffel of Jagdgeschwader 53 – Mediterranean Theater — 1 January – 27 June 1944
| 51 | 6 February 44 | 16:37 | Spitfire | 10 km (6.2 mi) north of Nettuno | 52 | 14 April 44 | 10:24 | P-47 | PQ 14 Ost S/FD-5 south of Elba |

=== Awards ===
- Iron Cross (1939) 2nd and 1st Class
- Honor Goblet of the Luftwaffe on 20 October 1941 as Oberfeldwebel in a Jagdgeschwader
- German Cross in Gold on 22 May 1942 as Oberfeldwebel in the 11./Jagdgeschwader 51
- Knight's Cross of the Iron Cross on 24 October 1944 as Oberleutnant and Staffelkapitän of the 9./Jagdgeschwader 53 (Note: According to Scherzer as Staffelkapitän in the III./Jagdgeschwader 53.)
