= Franz Schieß =

German World War II fighter pilot (1921–1943)

- Schieß as an Oberleutnant
- Born: 21 February 1921; St. Pölten, Austria
- Died: 2 September 1943 (aged 22); Gulf of Naples, off Ischia, Fascist Italy
- Cause of death: Killed in action
- Military career
- Allegiance: Nazi Germany
- Branch: Army; Luftwaffe
- Service years: Army (1938–40); Luftwaffe (1940–43)
- Rank: Hauptmann (captain)
- Nickname: "Nawratil"
- Unit: JG 53
- Commands: 8./JG 53
- Conflicts: World War II: Polish Campaign (Heer); Channel Front; North African Campaign and Mediterranean Theatre
- Awards: Knight's Cross of the Iron Cross

Franz Schieß (21 February 1921 – 2 September 1943) was a Luftwaffe fighter ace. He claimed 67 victories in 657 missions, (14 on the Eastern Front, and 53 against the Western Allies) whilst flying the Messerschmitt Bf 109.

Schieß initially served in the Heer (German Army) during the Invasion of Poland. He then transferred to the Luftwaffe, was trained as a fighter pilot, and was posted to Jagdgeschwader 53 (JG 53—53rd Fighter Wing). He claimed his first aerial victories on 22 June 1941, the first day of Operation Barbarossa, the German invasion of the Soviet Union. JG 53 was transferred to the Mediterranean Theatre in late 1941. In early 1943, Schieß was appointed Staffelkapitän (squadron leader) of 8. Staffel (8th squadron) of JG 53. He was shot down and killed in action over the Gulf of Naples, off Ischia, on 2 September 1943.

== Early life and career ==
Schieß, also known as Franz Schiehs, was born on 25 February 1921 in Wörth, part of Sankt Pölten, in Lower Austria. During the Invasion of Poland, which marked the beginning of World War II in Europe, he served in the Heer (German Army) before transferring to the Luftwaffe in 1940. Following pilot and fighter pilot training, (Note: Flight training in the Luftwaffe progressed through the levels A1, A2 and B1, B2, referred to as A/B flight training. A training included theoretical and practical training in aerobatics, navigation, long-distance flights and dead-stick landings. The B courses included high-altitude flights, instrument flights, night landings and training to handle the aircraft in difficult situations.) Schieß was posted to the Geschwaderstab (headquarters unit) of Jagdgeschwader 53 (JG 53—53rd Fighter Wing) in March 1941.

When Schieß joined JG 53 in March 1941, the Geschwaderstab was based at Köln-Butzweilerhof Airfield for a period of rest and replenishment and was commanded by Geschwaderkommodore (wing commander) Major Günther Freiherr von Maltzahn. Following training on the then new Messerschmitt Bf 109 F-2 aircraft, the Geschwaderstab transferred to the English Channel where they were based at Saint-Omer-Wizernes on 15 March. Serving with the Geschwaderstab for nearly two years, Schieß established a close friendship with Maltzahn. Later, the members of his Staffel (squadron) called him "Nawratil", after his radio call sign name.

== Fighter pilot career ==
Schieß engaged in aerial combat for the first time on 24 March 1941. Flying a combat air patrol from Dungeness to Dover, he engaged in combat with two Royal Air Force (RAF) Supermarine Spitfire fighters. In a head-on attack, neither side scored any hits. JG 53 was withdrawn from the Channel Front on 8 June 1941 and ordered to Mannheim-Sandhofen Airfield in preparation of Operation Barbarossa, the German invasion of the Soviet Union. The Geschwaderstab then moved to Krzewica, located approximately 70 kilometers (43 miles) west of Brest, on 14 June. Here, JG 53 was subordinated to Luftflotte 2 (Air Fleet 2) and was deployed on the right flank of Army Group Centre. On 22 June, the opening day of Operation Barbarossa, Schieß claimed his first aerial victories, destroying an Polikarpov I-153 biplane fighter and an Ilyushin DB-3 bomber.

On 9 July as the Battle of Białystok–Minsk came to and end, the Geschwaderstab reached an airfield named Tyranovka, located approximately 15 kilometers (9.3 miles) north of Myropil. Here they fought in the Battle of Uman. On 21 July, the Geschwaderstab reached Bila Tserkva. Three days later, Schieß claimed his eleventh aerial victory. On 6 August, they were then withdrawn from the Eastern Front, returning to Germany for further deployment on the Western Front. For his achievements on the Eastern Front, Schieß had been awarded both classes of the Iron Cross (Eisernes Kreuz), which included the presentation of the Iron Cross 1st Class (Eisernes Kreuz erster Klasse) on 24 July.

=== Malta and North Africa ===
The ground personnel of JG 53 began their relocation to Sicily in late November 1941. Equipped with the Messerschmitt Bf 109 F-4/Z, the Geschwaderstab followed on 13 December via Mannheim-Sandhofen, Munich-Riem, Naples, finally arriving at Comiso Airfield on 15 December. In December 1942, Schieß succeeded Oberleutnant Wilfried Pufahl as Geschwaderadjutant, the assisting officer helping the Geschwaderkommodore. Operating from Sicily, Schieß flew combat missions during the Siege of Malta, claiming eleven aerial victories.

Schieß claimed his first aerial victory in this theater on 25 January 1942. That day, RAF fighters escorted supply shipping and destroyers from Force K. As the ships passed the Delimara peninsula, located on the edge of the Marsaxlokk Bay, they came under attack by four Junkers Ju 88 bombers escorted by five Bf 109s from the Geschwaderstab. In this encounter, Luftwaffe pilots claimed eight aerial victories, including one by Schieß. The RAF squadrons lost three of five Hawker Hurricane fighters from No. 185 Squadron, No. 126 Squadron lost two aircraft, No. 249 Squadron sustained one loss, and No. 242 Squadron suffered three losses. On 24 February, Schieß shot down Pilot Officer Don Tedford flying Hurricane BG771 from No. 249 Squadron. Tedford, who was wounded in the encounter, made a forced landing at RAF Luqa.

In August 1942, the Geschwaderstab was reequipped with the Bf 109 G-2 trop. On 8 November, Allied forced launched Operation Torch, the invasion of French North Africa. The next day, large elements of JG 53, including the Geschwaderstab, transferred to Tunis-El Aouina Airfield to provide aerial protection for the harbors at Tunis and Bizerte. Schieß claimed his first aerial victory over North Africa on 17 November. His opponent may have been a Spitfire from No. 111 Squadron piloted by Sergeant Nigel Basil Steevenson who was shot down and killed near Bône, now Annaba.

Schieß was awarded the German Cross in Gold (Deutsches Kreuz in Gold) on 23 January 1943. On 29 January, 22 Boeing B-17 Flying Fortress heavy bombers of the 17th and 310th Bombardment Group attacked Bizerte. Defending against this attack, Schieß claimed a B-17 bomber and an escorting Lockheed P-38 Lightning fighter, probably belonging to the 82nd Fighter Group piloted by Lieutenant George W. Scott, shot down.

=== Squadron leader ===
On 16 February 1943, the now Oberleutnant Schieß was appointed Staffelkapitän (squadron leader) of 8. Staffel of JG 53. He succeeded Oberleutnant Jürgen Harder who had been transferred. The Staffel was subordinated to III. Gruppe of JG 53 under command of Major Franz Götz. He went on to claim 29 aerial victories as leader of 8. Staffel of JG 53. Schieß was regarded as one of the most enthusiastic and aggressive pilots in the Mediterranean theatre, and often flew the escort missions for the Junkers Ju 52 transport aircraft as they tried to evacuate personnel out of Africa. On 18 April he shot down a Spitfire (for his 43rd victory), but nevertheless 24 heavy-laden transports were shot down and a further 35 damaged, in what became known as the "Palm Sunday Massacre".

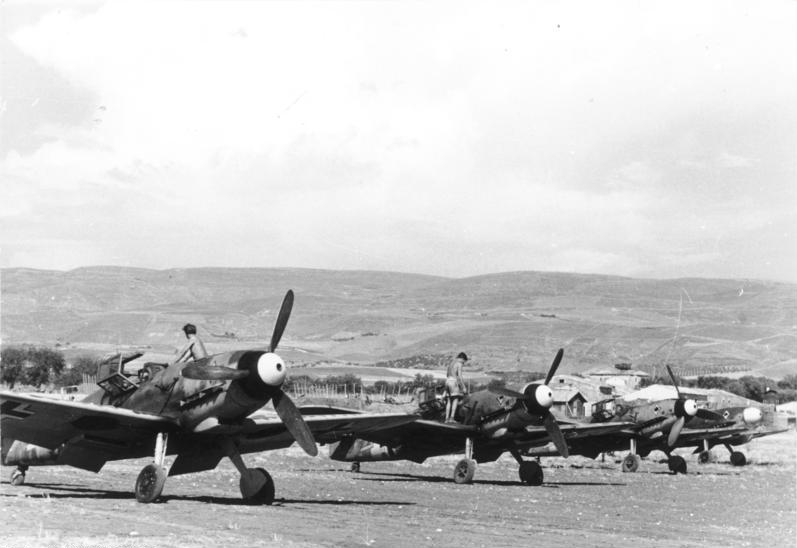
Bf 109s of JG 53, similar to those flown by Schieß.

Even when his unit was evacuated back to Sicily after the fall of Tunis in April 1943, he still flew over to Tunisia each day doing combat missions before returning to Sicily each night, writing home of "wonderful aerial combats". The aerial operations for Operation Corkscrew, the Allied invasion of the Italian island of Pantelleria, began on 18 May. Escorted by P-38 fighters from the USAAF 14th Fighter Group, bombers attacked Porto di Pantelleria, Margana airfield and Trapani. Defending against this attack, Schieß claimed a P-38 shot down northwest of Trapani. On 21 May, shortly before 11:00, III. Gruppe was scrambled to intercept a large USAAF bomber formation heading for Pantelleria. The Gruppe intercepted the bombers and their fighter escort at 11:30. In this encounter, Schieß claimed the destruction of a P-38, his 50th aerial victory, and damaging a second P-38. Schieß was awarded the Knight's Cross of the Iron Cross (Ritterkreuz des Eisernen Kreuzes) on 21 June. Four days later, he claimed a B-17 bomber shot down 30 kilometers (19 miles) south of Stromboli.

When on 18 August, Götz was promoted to Major and sent on home leave, Harder was temporarily tasked with leading III. Gruppe on the ground while Schieß led in the air. The next day, he led the Gruppe in an attack on a large formation of USAAF B-17 bombers flying over Montecorvino Rovella. In this encounter, III. Gruppe pilots claimed six B-17 bombers shot down, including one by Schieß. Schieß shot down 12 enemy aircraft in 11 days, of which seven were P-38 twin-engine fighters. Together with Harder of III. Gruppe of JG 53, Schieß was promoted to the rank of Hauptmann (captain) on 1 September 1943.

=== Death ===
The next day, on 2 September 1943, Schieß led a scramble against a USAAF North American B-25 Mitchell bomber formation attacking rail marshalling yards at Cancello, Naples. His unit engaged the fighter escort of P-38 Lightnings. Unable to break through the fighter screen to attack the bombers, he followed the force back over the Gulf of Salerno. His final battle took place over the island of Ischia; at around 13:45, the pilots heard Franz Schieß radio: "At them again, everyone get ready!" At the time, the formation was 30 to 40 kilometers (19 to 25 miles) southwest of Ischia when Hauptmann Schieß's wingman was forced away by two Lightnings and lost sight of his Staffelkapitän. Ten of the P-38s were shot down, but Schieß's Bf 109 G-6 "Black 1 + I" (Werknummer 160 022—factory number) crashed into the Mediterranean 30 to 50 kilometers (19 to 31 miles) south-southwest of Ischia in the Gulf of Salerno. Though not witnessed, he was probably shot down by a P-38.

On September 27 Günther von Maltzahn wrote to Schieß's parents expressing the close friendship they shared:

I ask that you and your husband accept my and my Geschwader's most sincere and heartfelt sympathy on the unspeakably hard stroke of fate which befell your son Franz.

I can sympathize with how hard it must be to come to terms with thoughts that you will never see your son Franz again in this life. One could not have wished for a better officer. Not only did there exist a comradeship and a mutual trust between Kommodore and adjutant that was tested in far more than 100 air battles, but in him I lost my best friend, on whom I could depend no matter what the situation.

Command of 8. Staffel remained vacant for almost two weeks until Hauptmann Karl Leonhard was transferred on 15 September. With 17 aerial victories claimed over the P-38, Schieß was the most successful Luftwaffe fighter pilot combating the P-38.

== Summary of career ==
=== Aerial victory claims ===
According to US historian David T. Zabecki, Schieß was credited with 67 aerial victories. Spick also lists Schieß with 67 aerial victories claimed in 540 combat missions and a mission-to-claim ratio of 8.06. This figure includes 13 aerial victories in North Africa, a further 40 aerial victories in the Mediterranean theater and 14 more on the Eastern Front. Obermaier however states that Schieß flew 657 combat missions, including 29 on the English Channel, 84 on the Eastern Front and 376 over Malta. Mathews and Foreman, authors of Luftwaffe Aces — Biographies and Victory Claims, researched the German Federal Archives and found documentation for 68 aerial victory claims, plus one further unconfirmed claim. This number includes 14 claims on the Eastern Front and 54 over the Western Allies, including three four-engined bombers.

Chronicle of aerial victories
This and the – (dash) indicates unconfirmed aerial victory claims for which Schieß did not receive credit. This and the ? (question mark) indicates information discrepancies listed by Prien, Stemmer, Rodeike, Bock, Mathews and Foreman.
Claim	Date	Time	Type	Location	Claim	Date	Time	Type	Location
– Stab of Jagdgeschwader 53 – Operation Barbarossa — 22 June – 6 August 1941
1	22 June 1941	07:25	I-153	northwest of Kobryn	8	14 July 1941	11:00	SB-3	
2	22 June 1941	16:35	DB-3	Biała Podlaska	9	20 July 1941	17:52	I-15	vicinity of Uman
3	24 June 1941	10:00	SB-2	northwest of Kobryn	10	23 July 1941	06:33	I-16	vicinity of Uman
4	24 June 1941	10:10	SB-2	vicinity of Kobryn	11	24 July 1941	11:45	I-16	vicinity of Uman
5	29 June 1941	19:55	SB-3	vicinity of Bobruysk	12	25 July 1941	18:14	I-15	northeast of Bila Tserkva
6	6 July 1941	14:05	DB-3	east of Polonne	13	26 July 1941	11:00	V-11 (Il-2)	
7	7 July 1941	06:15	SB-3	east of Polonne	14	29 July 1941	17:02	SB-3	
– Stab of Jagdgeschwader 53 – Mediterranean Theater — 15 December 1941 – 31 December 1942
15	25 January 1942	10:49	Hurricane	south of Malta south of La Valletta	24	17 October 1942	13:41? (Note: According to Mathews and Foreman claimed at 13:41.)	Spitfire	5 km (3.1 mi) north of La Valletta
16	24 February 1942	16:00	Hurricane	vicinity of Malta	25	17 November 1942	13:37	Spitfire	Bône harbour
17	15 June 1942	15:15	Beaufighter	west of Linosa	26	25 November 1942	12:00	Spitfire	10 km (6.2 mi) north-northwest of Majaz al Bab
18	7 July 1942	10:47	Spitfire	vicinity of Malta	27	3 December 1942	11:41	P-38	La Garaet Achkil
19	9 July 1942	12:20	Spitfire	vicinity of Malta	28	4 December 1942	16:04	Boston	6 km (3.7 mi) south of Jefna
20	14 July 1942	10:32	Spitfire	5 km (3.1 mi) east-southeast of La Valetta; 5 km (3.1 mi) east-northeast of Zonqor Point Malta	29	5 December 1942	15:40	P-38	5 km (3.1 mi) west of Djebel Abiod
21	18 July 1942	14:33	Spitfire	5 km (3.1 mi) north of La Valetta	—	5 December 1942	15:42	P-38	west of Djebel Abiod
22	26 August 1942	13:17	Spitfire	12 km (7.5 mi) south of La Valetta	30	6 December 1942	15:58	Dragonfly	18 km (11 mi) south of Djebel Abiod
23	11 October 1942	14:35	Spitfire	vicinity of Malta	31	18 December 1942	11:08	Spitfire	20 km (12 mi) west of Jefna
– Stab of Jagdgeschwader 53 – Mediterranean Theater — 1 January – 15 February 1943
32	2 January 1943	09:07	Spitfire	20 km (12 mi) east of Bône	35	17 January 1943	14:00	P-38	28 km (17 mi) northeast of Béja
33	4 January 1943	12:23	P-40	20 km (12 mi) southwest of Sbeitla southwest of Pichon	36	29 January 1943	11:10	B-17	15 km (9.3 mi) northeast of Béja
34	16 January 1943	13:48	Hurricane	15 km (9.3 mi) west-southwest of Tebourba; 18 km (11 mi) southeast of Mateur	37	29 January 1943	11:30	P-38	12 km (7.5 mi) northeast of Bou Arada; 12 km (7.5 mi) southwest of Mateur
– 8. Staffel of Jagdgeschwader 53 – Mediterranean Theater — 16 February – 2 September 1943
38	26 February 1943	17:02	Spitfire	40 km (25 mi) north of La Valetta	54	11 June 1943	15:37	Spitfire	20 km (12 mi) northwest of Pantelleria
39	25 March 1943	09:44	Spitfire	5 km (3.1 mi) northwest of La Valetta	55	25 June 1943	12:13	B-17	30 km (19 mi) south of Stromboli
40	5 April 1943	19:00	Spitfire	southwest of Béja	56	19 August 1943	12:20	B-17	40 km (25 mi) southeast of Benevento
41	11 April 1943	09:59	Spitfire	3 km (1.9 mi) north of Mateur; 7 km (4.3 mi) south of Tunis	57	20 August 1943	12:43	P-38	12 km (7.5 mi) north of Grazzanise
42	17 April 1943	19:14	Spitfire	18 km (11 mi) north of Medjez el Bab vicinity of Cap Vito	58	21 August 1943	13:04	B-26	12 km (7.5 mi) west of Capua
43	18 April 1943	18:07	Spitfire	24 km (15 mi) southwest of Mateur	59	22 August 1943	12:17	B-26	50 km (31 mi) southwest of Capri
44	29 April 1943	16:02	P-38	3 km (1.9 mi) north of Cape Farina	60	23 August 1943	11:30	Catalina	south of Capri
45	8 May 1943	18:45	P-40	8 km (5.0 mi) southeast of Cape Bon	? (Note: This claim is not listed by Prien, Stemmer, Rodeike and Bock.)	26 August 1943	12:52	B-26	
46	8 May 1943	19:00	P-40	10 km (6.2 mi) northeast of Zembra; 18 km (11 mi) east of Kelebia	61	26 August 1943	12:52? (Note: According to Mathews and Foreman, claimed at 13:37.)	P-38	8 km (5.0 mi) south of Gaeta; 2 km (1.2 mi) west of Grazzanise
?	11 May 1943	12:25	P-40	10 km (6.2 mi) southwest of Marsala	62	27 August 1943	12:39? (Note: According to Mathews and Foreman, claimed at 12:51.)	B-25	15 km (9.3 mi) northeast of Capua; 10 km (6.2 mi) north of Benevento
47	18 May 1943	14:15	P-38	northwest of Trapani	63	27 August 1943	12:51? (Note: According to Mathews and Foreman, claimed at 13:11.)	P-38	10 km (6.2 mi) west of Benevento; 40 km (25 mi) south of Capri
49	19 May 1943	13:47	P-38	36 km (22 mi) west of Marettimo	64	28 August 1943	15:43	P-38	2 km (1.2 mi) east of Altamura east of Castel Volturno
50	21 May 1943	11:24	P-38	40 km (25 mi) north of Pantelleria	65	28 August 1943	15:51? (Note: According to Mathews and Foreman, claimed at 15:21.)	P-38	east of Castel Volturno; 2 km (1.2 mi) east of Albaccora
51	25 May 1943	11:03? (Note: According to Mathews and Foreman, claimed at 11:05.)	P-38	30 km (19 mi) northwest of Trapani	66	30 August 1943	12:06	P-38	southwest of Castel Volturno
52	6 June 1943	06:42	Boston	20 km (12 mi) northwest of Pantelleria	67	30 August 1943	12:15	P-38	southwest of Castel Volturno
53	10 June 1943	15:50	P-40	1 km (0.62 mi) west of Pantelleria					

=== Awards ===
- Iron Cross (1939) 2nd and 1st Class
- Honor Goblet of the Luftwaffe on 7 September 1942 as Leutnant and pilot
- German Cross in Gold on 23 January 1943 as Leutnant in Stab/Jagdgeschwader 53
- Knight's Cross of the Iron Cross on 21 June 1943 as Oberleutnant and Staffelkapitän of the 8./Jagdgeschwader 53

== Notes ==
Military offices
Preceded by Leutnant Jürgen Harder	Staffelkapitän of 8. Staffel of Jagdgeschwader 53; 15 February 1943 – 2 September 1943	Succeeded by Hauptmann Karl Leonhard
