= Capo Passero =

Promontory of Sicily, Italy

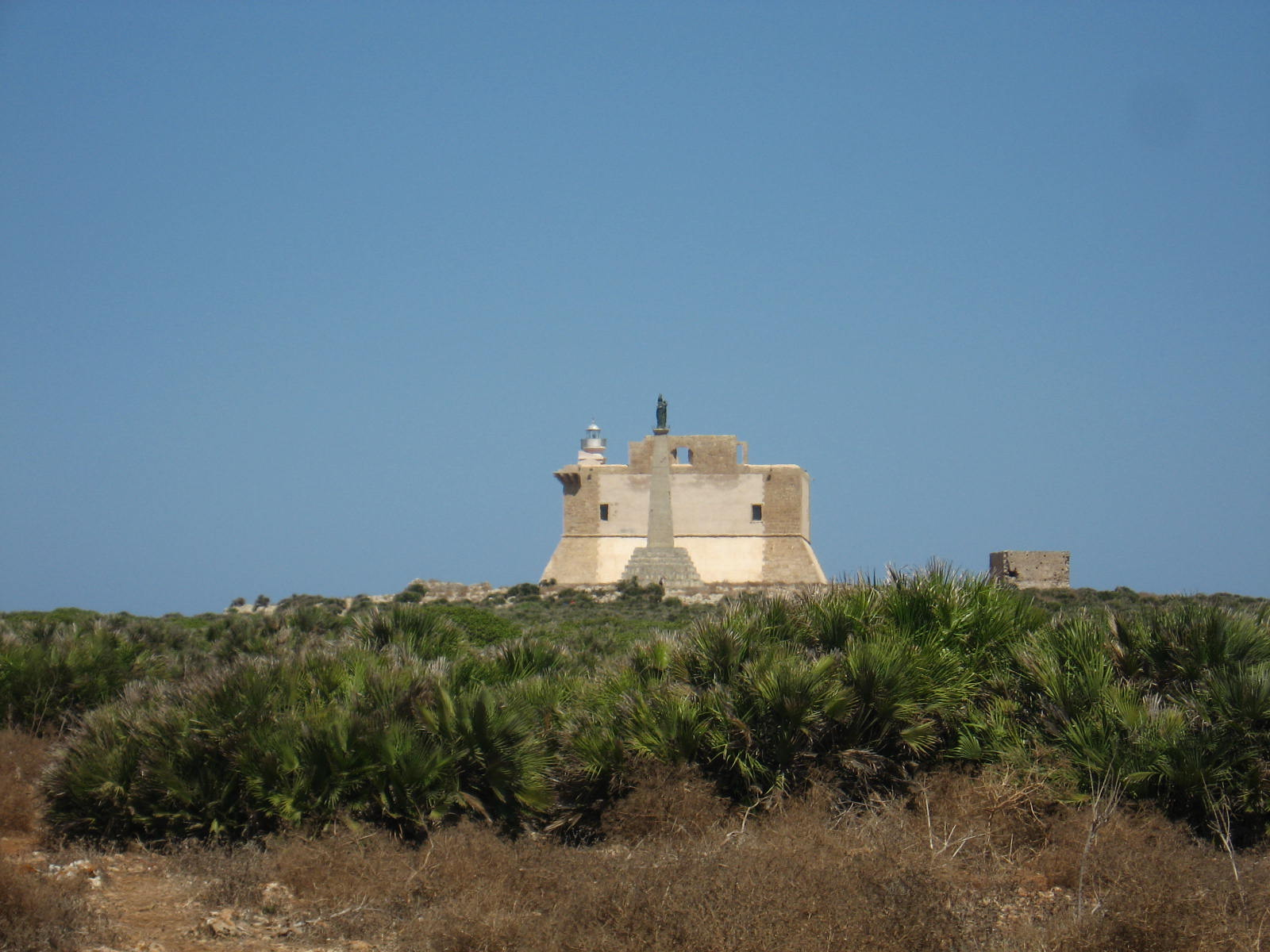
- The fort of Capo Passero

- Location in Italy
- Coordinates: 36°41′18.4″N 15°09′06.1″E
- Country: Italy
- Region: Sicily

Capo Passero or Cape Passaro (Sicilian: Capu Pàssaru; Greek: Πάχυνος or Πάχυνον; Latin: Pachynus or Pachynum) is a celebrated promontory of Sicily, forming the extreme southeastern point of the whole island, and one of the three promontories which were supposed to have given to it the name of "Trinacria". (Ovid, Fast. iv. 479, Met. xiii. 725; Dionys. Per. 467–72; Scyl. p. 4. § 13; Pol. i. 42; Strabo vi. pp. 265, 272, &c.; Plin. iii. 8. s. 14; Ptol. iii. 4. § 8; Mela, ii. 7. § 15.)

== Historical significance ==
Ancient geographers correctly describe it as extending out towards the south and east so as to be the point of Sicily that was the most nearly opposite to Crete and the Peloponnese. It is at the same time the southernmost point of the whole inland. The headland itself is not lofty, but formed by bold projecting rocks (projecta saxa Puchyni, Virg. Aen. iii. 699), and immediately off it lies a small rocky island (the Isola di Capo Passero) of considerable elevation, which appears to have been generally regarded as forming the actual promontory. This explains the expression of Nonnus, who speaks of the island rock of the seagirt Pachynus. (Dionys. xiii. 322.) Lycophron also has a similar phrase. (Alex. 1181.)

According to Cicero, (Verr. v. 34) there was a port in the immediate neighborhood of the promontory to which he gives the name of Portus Pachyni: it was here that the fleet of Verres was stationed under his officer Cleomenes, when the news that a squadron of pirates was in the neighbouring Port of Ulysses (Portus Odysseae) caused that commander to take to flight with precipitation. Ptolemy gives the name of Promontory of Ulysses (Ὀδυσσεία ἄκρα, Ptol. iii. 4. § 7) to a point on the south coast of the island, a little to the west of Cape Pachynus. It is therefore probable that the Portus Pachyni was the one now called Porto di Palo, immediately adjoining the promontory, while the Portus Odysseae may be identified with Pantano Longarini.

The convenience of this port at the extreme southeast point of the island caused it to be a frequent place of rendezvous and station for fleets approaching Sicily; and on one occasion, during the Second Punic War the Carthaginian commander Bomilcar appears to have taken up his post in the port to the west of the promontory, while the Roman fleet lay immediately to the north of it. (Livy xxiv. 27, xxv. 27, xxxvi. 2.)

In 1718, the seas off the promontory were the site of a great naval battle (called the Battle of Cape Passero) between the British and Spanish fleets.

== See also ==
- Capo Passero Lighthouse
