= Portopalo di Capo Passero =

- Comune
- Comune di Portopalo di Capo Passero
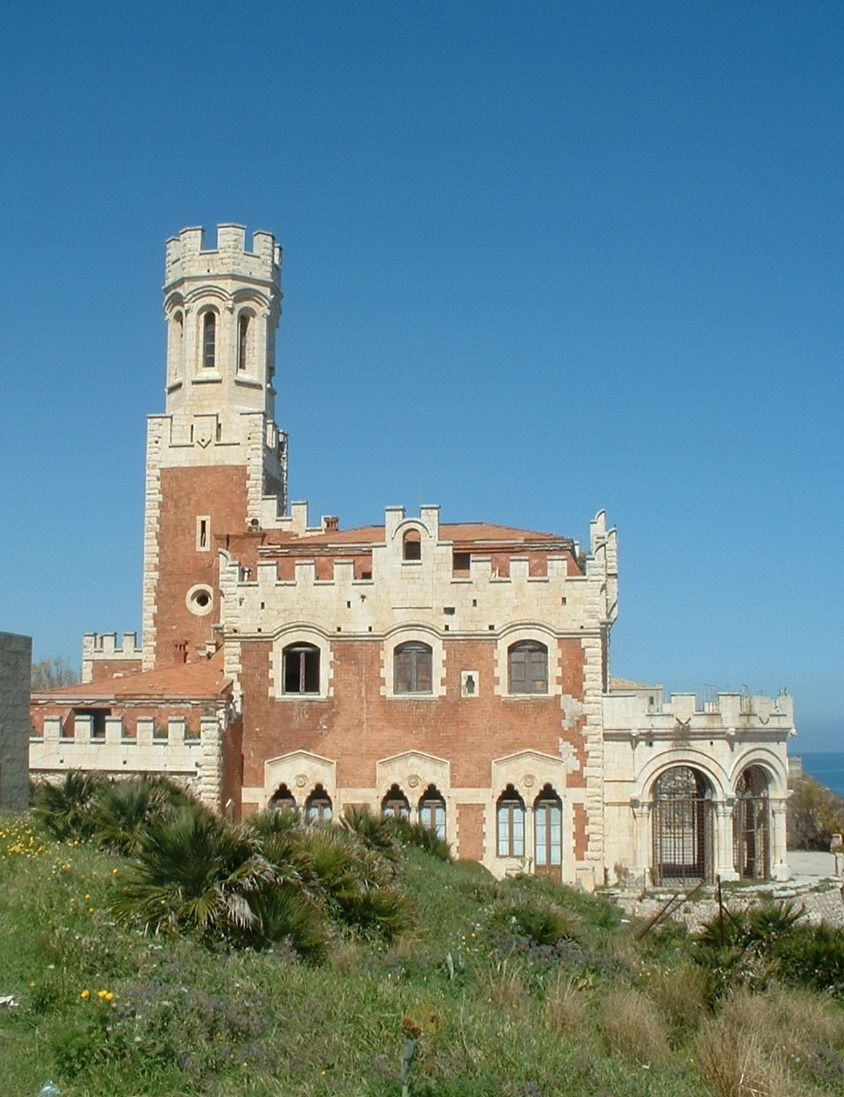
- Castle Tafuri

- Location within Italy Location within Sicily
- Coordinates: 36°41′N 15°8′E
- Country: Italy
- Region: Sicily
- Province: Province of Syracuse (SR)

Area
  - Total: 14.9 km^{2} (5.8 sq mi)
- Elevation: 20 m (66 ft)

Population (February 2017)
  - Total: 3,916
  - Density: 263/km^{2} (681/sq mi)
- Demonym: Portopalesi
- Time zone: UTC+1 (CET)
  - Summer (DST): UTC+2 (CEST)
- Postal code: 96010
- Dialing code: 0931

Portopalo di Capo Passero (Sicilian: Puortupalu) is a comune (municipality) in the Province of Syracuse, Sicily (Italy). The southernmost commune of the island of Sicily, it is about 220 kilometres (140 mi) southeast of Palermo and about 45 kilometres (28 mi) southwest of Syracuse. As of February 2017, it had a population of 3,916 and an area of 14.9 square kilometres (5.8 mi^{2}). The nearest city is Pachino with a population of nearly 10,000. Portopalo belonged to the municipality of Pachino until 1975 when it became an autonomous municipality itself. Portopalo is widely considered to have some of the best fishing that the Mediterranean area has to offer because of its location, connection of the Ionian and Mediterranean Seas and its subtropical climate, which provides average temperatures between 12° and 27 °C.

== Isola di Capo Passero ==
Isola di Capo Passero, a small island near Portopalo, houses Forte di Capo Passero. Constructed in 1599 under Spanish rule by architect Giovanni Antonio del Nobile, it served as defense against Mediterranean piracy. The fort controlled access to Europe until its transformation into a military prison in the 18th century. A Royal Decree in 1866 halted prison operations, followed by the installation of a lighthouse in 1871, which operated until the late 1950s under the Italian Navy.

== Chiesa di St. Gaetano ==
The Church of San Gaetano, erected in 1927, embodies a striking symmetrical design, characterized by its meticulously crafted stone facades accentuated by symmetrical spires. The central focal point, the tympanum, crowns the structure with a sense of architectural grandeur. Crafted entirely from meticulously shaped stone, the entrance portal is flanked by ornate columns supporting an arch-tympanum, with a centrally positioned circular window illuminating the interior. Flanking the portal are two terracotta adornments, adding to the aesthetic appeal.

Inside, the single nave features a semi-circular roof adorned with cane and plaster, culminating in a semicircular apse also adorned with cane and plaster. Adjacent to the nave, on the right side, lies the SS chapel, characterized by its quadrangular shape. Adorned with niches housing statues of saints, the side walls are adorned with intricately intertwined arches and stone pilasters, while windows punctuate the upper reaches, casting natural light upon the sacred space.

Positioned at the rear left of the edifice, the bell tower rises, accessible from the rear apse.

== Port One Harbor ==
The Port One harbor project, commencing its construction phase in late 2024, is envisioned as a comprehensive harbor complex, offering 566 berths tailored to accommodate vessels of diverse sizes for both short-term visits and long-term moorings.

== History ==
The name Portopalo comes from the Latin Portus Palus meaning 'marshy harbour'. In 1975 the words Capo Passero have been added to distinguish it from the homonymous Porto Palo in the province of Agrigento.

Portopalo has historically been a predominantly agricultural and fishing town, and in addition to tourism, the economic activity remains in these industries. On the eastern shore of the municipalities lies the Island of Capo Passero where the Spanish Fort still stands to this day.

=== World War II ===
Portopalo is widely considered the location where the liberation of Italy from German occupation in World War II was initiated. On July 10, 1943, after taking control of Northern Africa, American, British and Commonwealth allied troops arrived on the shores near Gela and Pachino (Portopalo) in an attempt to attain control over the eastern portion of Italy. Eastern Italy had been controlled by Nazi Germany and the allied troops were aware that taking control of the island of Sicily would enable them to liberate the whole of Italy from German control. Military actions in Sicily ended on August 17, 1943, with Italy signing an unconditional armistice with the Allied forces on September 8 of that year.

=== 1996 Shipping Disaster ===
The sea 19 nautical miles off Portopalo was the scene of the worst shipping disaster to hit the Mediterranean since the Second World War. In the early hours of December 26, 1996, a fishing vessel F174 carrying more than 300 South Asian migrants sank off the coast of Sicily and 283 of them drowned.

The catastrophe happened when the Yohan, a merchant ship carrying the migrants from Greece, approached the Sicilian coast and nearly three hundred people were transferred from the freighter to a fishing boat that measured 18 by 4 metres (59 by 13 ft). During the operation the two vessels collided and the fishing vessel sank.

Some of their bodies remain trapped in the ship's wreck, 108 metres (354 ft) below the surface. For most of the following years the disaster was considered nothing more than a ghost story. Harbor officials and fishermen from the port of Portopalo kept silent and the Italian government denied the tragedy ever took place, and refused to accept the testimonies of survivors.

Salvatore Lupo, a local fisherman, began speaking out about the accident in 2001 after he found a victim's identification card in his fishing net. He then helped a journalist, Giovanni Mario Bellu working for La Repubblica, locate the wreck with an underwater robot equipped with cameras.

== Demographic evolution ==
Historical population

Year	Pop.	±%
1861	412	—
1871	538	+30.6%
1881	611	+13.6%
1901	980	+60.4%
1911	1,093	+11.5%

Year	Pop.	±%
1921	1,498	+37.1%
1931	1,857	+24.0%
1936	1,710	−7.9%
1951	2,149	+25.7%
1961	2,366	+10.1%

Year	Pop.	±%
1971	2,609	+10.3%
1981	3,083	+18.2%
1991	3,211	+4.2%
2001	3,500	+9.0%

Source: Data from ISTAT

== Geography ==
Portopalo di Capo Passero borders the following municipalities: Pachino.

=== Climate ===
The Köppen Climate Classification subtype for this climate is "Csa" (Mediterranean Climate).

Climate data for Cozzo Spadaro (1991–2020)
Month	Jan	Feb	Mar	Apr	May	Jun	Jul	Aug	Sep	Oct	Nov	Dec	Year
Mean daily maximum °C (°F)	15.5 (59.9)	15.5 (59.9)	17.0 (62.6)	19.3 (66.7)	22.9 (73.2)	27.2 (81.0)	30.4 (86.7)	30.9 (87.6)	27.8 (82.0)	24.2 (75.6)	20.3 (68.5)	17.0 (62.6)	22.3 (72.2)
Daily mean °C (°F)	12.5 (54.5)	12.3 (54.1)	13.7 (56.7)	15.9 (60.6)	19.4 (66.9)	23.6 (74.5)	26.5 (79.7)	27.3 (81.1)	24.5 (76.1)	21.2 (70.2)	17.4 (63.3)	14.0 (57.2)	19.0 (66.2)
Mean daily minimum °C (°F)	9.6 (49.3)	9.3 (48.7)	10.7 (51.3)	12.8 (55.0)	16.1 (61.0)	20.1 (68.2)	22.9 (73.2)	23.9 (75.0)	21.4 (70.5)	18.3 (64.9)	14.6 (58.3)	11.2 (52.2)	15.9 (60.6)
Average precipitation mm (inches)	80.6 (3.17)	60.8 (2.39)	42.9 (1.69)	26.2 (1.03)	13.3 (0.52)	5.0 (0.20)	1.6 (0.06)	13.1 (0.52)	69.3 (2.73)	96.3 (3.79)	95.7 (3.77)	145.9 (5.74)	650.7 (25.61)
Average precipitation days (≥ 1.0 mm)	7.9	6.9	5.1	3.7	2.2	0.8	0.3	0.8	3.8	6.0	7.3	8.6	53.4
Average relative humidity (%)	75.65	74.86	75.94	75.71	72.48	70.39	68.16	69.65	73.62	77.41	76.33	75.23	73.79
Average dew point °C (°F)	8.4 (47.1)	7.4 (45.3)	8.5 (47.3)	10.5 (50.9)	13.7 (56.7)	16.7 (62.1)	18.6 (65.5)	20.0 (68.0)	18.6 (65.5)	16.0 (60.8)	12.7 (54.9)	9.7 (49.5)	13.4 (56.1)
Mean monthly sunshine hours	178.6	185.1	224.1	247.2	301.0	321.6	357.7	325.2	248.7	211.7	182.4	168.3	2,951.6
Source: NOAA, (Dew Point for 1981-2010)
