= Herbert Huppertz =

German fighter ace and Knight's Cross recipient

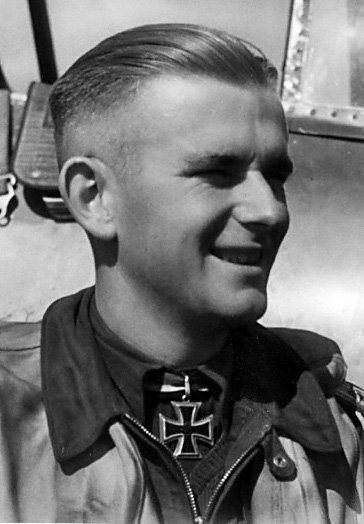
- Huppertz as a Hauptmann
- Born: 3 June 1919; Rheydt, Germany
- Died: 8 June 1944 (aged 25); Caen, German-occupied France
- Cause of death: Killed in action
- Burial place: La Cambe German war cemetery
- Military career
- Allegiance: Nazi Germany
- Branch: Luftwaffe
- Service years: 1937–1944
- Rank: Major (Posthumously)
- Units: JG 51, JG 1, JG 5, JG 2
- Commands: 1.(Erg.)/JG 51, 12./JG 1, 9./JG 5, 10./JG 5, 3./JG 2, 10./JG 2, 12./JG 2, III./JG 2
- Conflicts: See battles World War II: Battle of France; Battle of Britain; Operation Barbarossa; Channel Dash; Defense of the Reich; Operation Overlord †
- Awards: Knight's Cross of the Iron Cross with Oak Leaves

Herbert Huppertz (3 June 1919 – 8 June 1944) was a German Luftwaffe military aviator and fighter ace during World War II. He is credited between 68 and 73 aerial victories, depending on source, achieved in approximately 380 combat missions. This figure includes 28 aerial victories on the Eastern Front, and further victories over the Western Allies, including 17 four-engined bombers.

Born in Rheydt, Huppertz grew up in the Weimar Republic and Nazi Germany. He joined the military service in the Luftwaffe in 1937. Following flight training, he was posted to Jagdgeschwader 51 (JG 51—51st Fighter Wing) in 1939. Flying with this wing, Huppertz claimed his first aerial victory on 28 May 1940 on the Western Front during the Dunkirk evacuation. Fighting on the Eastern Front, Huppertz was awarded the Knight's Cross of the Iron Cross on 30 August 1941. He was made Staffelkapitän (squadron leader) of 12. Staffel (12th squadron) of Jagdgeschwader 1 (JG 1—1st Fighter Wing) in January 1942. Over the course of 1942, he also commanded 9. Staffel and 10. Staffel of Jagdgeschwader 5 (JG 5—5th Fighter Wing), before he was transferred to Jagdgeschwader 2 "Richthofen" (JG 2—2nd Fighter Wing) in November 1942. With JG 2, he commanded 3. Staffel, 10. Staffel and 12. Staffel. In March 1944, he was appointed Gruppenkommandeur (group commander) of III. Gruppe of JG 2. He was killed in action, shot down by a Republic P-47 Thunderbolt on 8 June 1944 during the Operation Overlord. Posthumously, Huppertz was awarded the Knight's Cross of the Iron Cross with Oak Leaves on 24 June 1944.

== Early life and career ==
Huppertz was born on 3 June 1919 in Rheydt, present-day a borough of Mönchengladbach, at the time an independent city in the Rhine Province. Huppertz, the son of a postal inspector (Postinspektor), joined the Luftwaffe in late 1937 as a Fahnenjunker (cadet). Following flight training, (Note: Flight training in the Luftwaffe progressed through the levels A1, A2 and B1, B2, referred to as A/B flight training. A training included theoretical and practical training in aerobatics, navigation, long-distance flights and dead-stick landings. The B courses included high-altitude flights, instrument flights, night landings and training to handle the aircraft in difficult situations.) he was posted to 6. Staffel (6th squadron) of Jagdgeschwader 51 (JG 51—51st Fighter Wing), a squadron of II. Gruppe (2nd group) of JG 51, in autumn 1939.

== World War II ==
World War II in Europe began on Friday, 1 September 1939, when German forces invaded Poland. On 20 October, 6. Staffel of JG 51 was a newly created squadron commanded by Oberleutnant Josef Priller based at Eutingen im Gäu. On 5 November, the Staffel officially became operational. On 9 February 1940, II. Gruppe was moved to Böblingen Airfield where it was subordinated to Jagdgeschwader 52 (JG 52—52nd Fighter Wing) and tasked with patrolling the Upper Rhine region during the Phoney War phase of World War II.

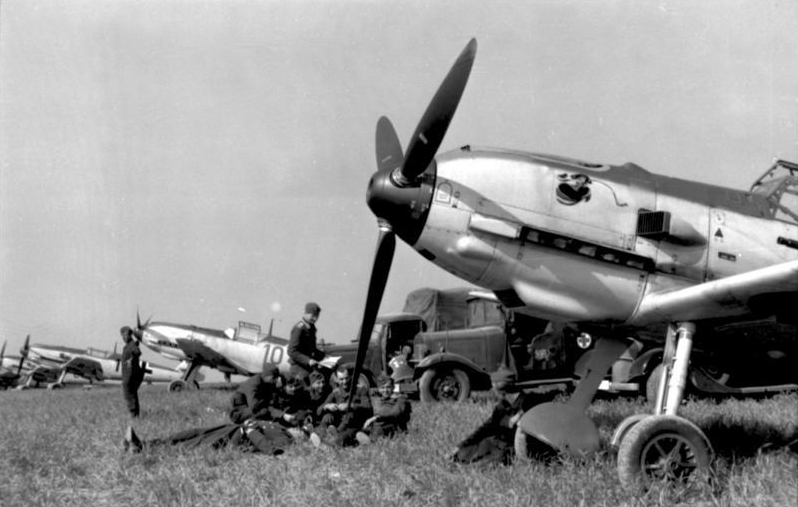
Bf 109 Es, similar to those flown by Huppertz over France and England.

On 11 May 1940, the second day of the Battle of France, II. Gruppe flew ground attack missions in the Alsace region. Following the German advance into Belgium and France, 6. Staffel was moved to Dinant on 26 May. That day, remnants of the French Army and the British Expeditionary Force (BEF) were retreating towards Dunkirk. To save the BEF, the British under the cover of the Royal Air Force (RAF), had launched Operation Dynamo. On 28 May, Huppertz claimed his first aerial victory. He was credited with shooting down a Supermarine Spitfire fighter over the Dunkirk battle zone. For this achievement, Huppertz was awarded the Iron Cross 2nd Class (Eisernes Kreuz zweiter Klasse) on 30 May 1940.

In July 1940, the Luftwaffe began a series of air operations dubbed Kanalkampf (Channel Battle) over the English Channel against the RAF, which marked the beginning of the Battle of Britain. On 7 July, Huppertz claimed his second aerial victory, a Spitfire shot down northwest of Dungeness. On 5 October, II. Gruppe moved to an airfield at Mardyck, west of Dunkirk. Four days later, Huppertz received the Iron Cross 1st Class (Eisernes Kreuz erster Klasse). He claimed his third aerial victory on 25 October, a Hawker Hurricane fighter shot down near Tunbridge Wells. On 20 October, Huppertz claimed a Spitfire fighter on a mission to London. His last aerial victory in 1940 was claimed on 14 November when he shot down another Spitfire fighter over the Thames Estuary. On 21 November, Huppertz was injured in a forced landing near Gravelines. The accident was caused by engine problems of his Messerschmitt Bf 109 E-1 (Werknummer 6199—factory number).

On 7 December, II. Gruppe was sent to Mannheim-Sandhofen for a period of replenishment and rest. On 14 February 1941, the Gruppe returned to Mardyck on the Channel Front. There, Huppertz claimed a Spitfire fighter shot down near Dungeness on 11 March. II. Gruppe of JG 51 was withdrawn from the Channel Front in early June 1941 and ordered to Dortmund where the unit was reequipped with the Bf 109 F series.

=== Operation Barbarossa ===
On 15 June, IV. Gruppe of JG 51 began transferring east and was located at an airfield named Krzewicze, located approximately 70 kilometers (43 miles) west of Brest-Litovsk. On 22 June, German forces launched Operation Barbarossa, the German invasion of the Soviet Union. JG 51, under the command of Oberstleutnant Werner Mölders, was subordinated to II. Fliegerkorps (2nd Air Corps), which as part of Luftflotte 2 (Air Fleet 2). JG 51 area of operation during Operation Barbarossa was over the right flank of Army Group Center in the combat area of the 2nd Panzer Group as well as the 4th Army.

On the first day of the invasion, Huppertz, who was flying with 12. Staffel commanded by Oberleutnant Karl-Gottfried Nordmann, claimed a Tupolev SB bomber shot down. The Gruppe was moved to an airfield at Schatalowka, present-day Shatalovo air base, 40 kilometers (25 miles) southeast of Smolensk, on 21 July. Huppertz accounted for a Petlyakov Pe-2 bomber on 23 July. Three were lost from the 411 BAP (Bombardirovochnyy Aviatsionyy Polk—bomber aviation regiment) operating under the OSNAZ (Osoboye Naznachenie—Special purpose-unit or task force). German pilots submitted three claims.

On 9 August, Huppertz was shot down in his Bf 109 F-2 (Werknummer 8938) near Schatalowka. He was shot down by the air gunner Serzhant Listratow from the 57 BAP. That day, he had claimed two aerial victories when he shot down a Polikarpov I-16 fighter and a SB-3 bomber. Huppertz was then transferred to 9. Staffel of JG 51 where he claimed his last aerial victory on the Eastern Front on 25 August over an I-16 fighter, taking his total to 34 aerial victories. At the time, 9. Staffel was commanded by Oberleutnant Karl-Heinz Schnell. Huppertz was awarded the Knight's Cross of the Iron Cross (Ritterkreuz des Eisernen Kreuzes) on 30 August 1941.

=== Squadron leader ===
In September 1941, Huppertz was appointed Staffelkapitän (squadron leader) of 1. Staffel of the Ergänzungsgruppe of JG 51, a supplementary training group. At the time, the unit was based in Zerbst before moving to Düsseldorf and to Vannes-Meucon Airfield in mid October. In January 1942, the Staffel became part of the newly formed IV. Gruppe of Jagdgeschwader 1 (JG 1—1st Fighter Wing) where it thus became 12. Staffel of JG 1. IV. Gruppe first major task was Operation Donnerkeil, an air superiority operation to support the Kriegsmarine's (German Navy) Operation Cerberus. The objective of this assignment was to give the German battleships Scharnhorst and Gneisenau and the heavy cruiser Prinz Eugen fighter protection in the breakout from Brest to Germany. During this operation, Huppertz claimed a Spitfire fighter shot down on 12 February. End-February to early March 1942, IV. Gruppe began relocating north to Trondheim. On 21 March, IV./JG 1 was renamed to III. Gruppe of Jagdgeschwader 5 (JG 5—5th Fighter Wing) and placed under the command of Hauptmann Günther Scholz. In consequence, Huppertz became the Staffelkapitän of 9. Staffel of JG 5.

On 2 April 1942, Huppertz attacked the de Havilland Mosquito W4056 aerial reconnaissance aircraft from the RAF No. 1 Photographic Reconnaissance Unit (No. 1 PRU) on a mission to Trondheim. The crew made a forced landing at the German Ørland Airfield and was taken prisoner of war. On 10 April, Huppertz shot down the Spitfire fighter AB307 from the No. 1 PRU. Its pilot, Flighing Officer Peter Geoffrey Charles Gimson was on an aerial reconnaissance mission searching for the German battleship Tirpitz. Although Gimson bailed out, his parachute failed to deploy and he fell to his death. On 1 May, 9. Staffel was renamed and became the 10. Staffel which was subordinated to IV. Gruppe of JG 5. On 10 May, Huppertz shot down Spitfire AB127 from No. 1 PRU. Flying Officer Ian Malcolm was also searching for Tirpitz when he was shot down and killed by Huppertz.

Huppertz left his 10. Staffel on 15 September to receive conversion training to the Focke-Wulf Fw 190. He received his training at the Værløse Air Base near Copenhagen. That day, he was injured when his Fw 190 A-2 (Werknummer 122208) suffered engine failure resulting in a forced landing near Mogensbæk. He was hospitalized at Frederikshavn and released on 1 October.

=== With Jagdgeschwader 2 "Richthofen" ===
JG 2 insignia

On 9 November 1942, Huppertz was transferred and appointed Staffelkapitän of 3. Staffel of Jagdgeschwader 2 "Richthofen" (JG 2—2nd Fighter Wing). He replaced Oberleutnant Elmar Resch who was injured in a flight accident the day before. At the time, I. Gruppe of JG 2 under command of Hauptmann Erich Hohagen, the Gruppe to which his Staffel was subordinated, was based in Triquerville on the English Channel. Huppertz was promoted to Hauptmann (captain) on 1 April 1943.

On 20 April 1943, Huppertz was transferred to III. Gruppe of JG 2 which was led by Hauptmann Egon Mayer. There, Huppertz was tasked with the formation of a new 10. Staffel. The former 10. Staffel was a fighter-bomber unit and had been detached from JG 2 on 6 April. Huppertz reformed 10. Staffel was initially based at Beaumont-le-Roger and equipped with Fw 190 A-5. In late June, the Staffel was declared operational readiness and moved to Vannes Airfield. There, Huppertz claimed a Lockheed P-38 Lightning F-5 aerial reconnaissance aircraft shot down on 29 June.

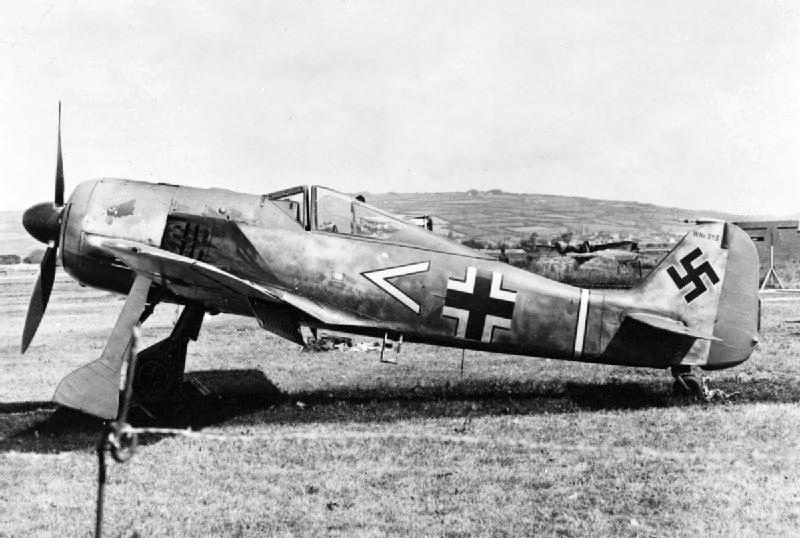
A Fw 190 fighter similar to those flown by Huppertz.

When Mayer was appointed Geschwaderkommodore (wing commander) of JG 2 on 25 June, Huppertz was again transferred. He took command of 12. Staffel from Hauptmann Bruno Stolle on 1 July who replaced Mayer as commander of III. Gruppe. Three days later on 4 July, the United States Army Air Forces (USAAF) attacked the U-boat pens at La Pallice, Nantes and Le Mans. Defending against this attack, Huppertz shot down a Boeing B-17 Flying Fortress bomber. The next day, flying off of Brest, he claimed a RAF Armstrong Whitworth Whitley bomber shot down. On 3 August, RAF fighter-bombers attacked the Luftwaffe Brest-Guipavas Airfield. Defending against this attack, Huppertz shot down a Hawker Typhoon fighter-bomber north of Brest. On 27 August, Huppertz claimed a North American B-25 Mitchell bomber shot down. On 30 August, Huppertz shot down a RAF North American P-51 Mustang fighter on a "Rhubarb" mission. The next day, he claimed a Spitfire fighter.

The Gruppe engaged in aerial combat with Martin B-26 Marauder bombers and their fighter escort heading for Rouen on 11 September. In this encounter, Huppertz claimed a Spitfire fighter shot down. Four days later, USAAF bombers headed for various industrial targets near Paris. That day, Huppertz shot down a B-17 bomber north of Saint-Germain-en-Laye. On 23 September, the USAAF VIII Bomber Command attacked Nantes, Vannes and Lorient. For the loss of four Fw 190 fighters, the Gruppe was credited with the destruction of two B-17 bombers, both of which attributed to Huppertz. The next day, Huppertz claimed a Spitfire destroyed.

On 14 October 1943, during the second Schweinfurt raid, Huppertz shot down a B-17 bomber southeast of Verdun. III. Gruppe flew in Defense of the Reich on 1 December when the VIII Bomber Command attacked Solingen that day. The Gruppe intercepted the bombers over Belgium where for the loss of two Fw 190 fighters, one B-17 was shot down by Huppertz. Huppertz received the German Cross in Gold (Deutsches Kreuz in Gold) on 26 December. Four days later, III. Gruppe intercepted VIII Bomber Command bombers on their bombing mission to Ludwigshafen. During this engagement, Huppertz claimed a Consolidated B-24 Liberator and a B-17 bomber shot down. The next day, the USAAF attacked various Luftwaffe airfields along the French Atlantic coast. That day, Huppertz was credited with a B-17 bomber shot down.

=== Group commander and death ===
On 20 February 1944, the first day of Big Week, Hupertz claimed the destruction of a B-17 bomber of the 91st Bombardment Group near Mons. Two days later, he shot down a B-24 bomber but was himself shot down in his Fw 190 A-7 (Werknummer 340275) and injured. A B-17 bomber shot down near Ulm on 18 March was his last four-engined heavy bomber claimed. In February 1944, Huppertz was appointed Gruppenkommandeur (group commander) of III. Gruppe of JG 2, succeeding Stolle who was transferred. (Note: According to Weal, Huppertz was appointed Gruppenkommandeur of III. Gruppe of JG 2 in March 1944.) Command of 11. Staffel was handed to Oberleutnant Jakob Schmitt. On 25 May, III. Gruppe moved to Fontenay-le-Comte.

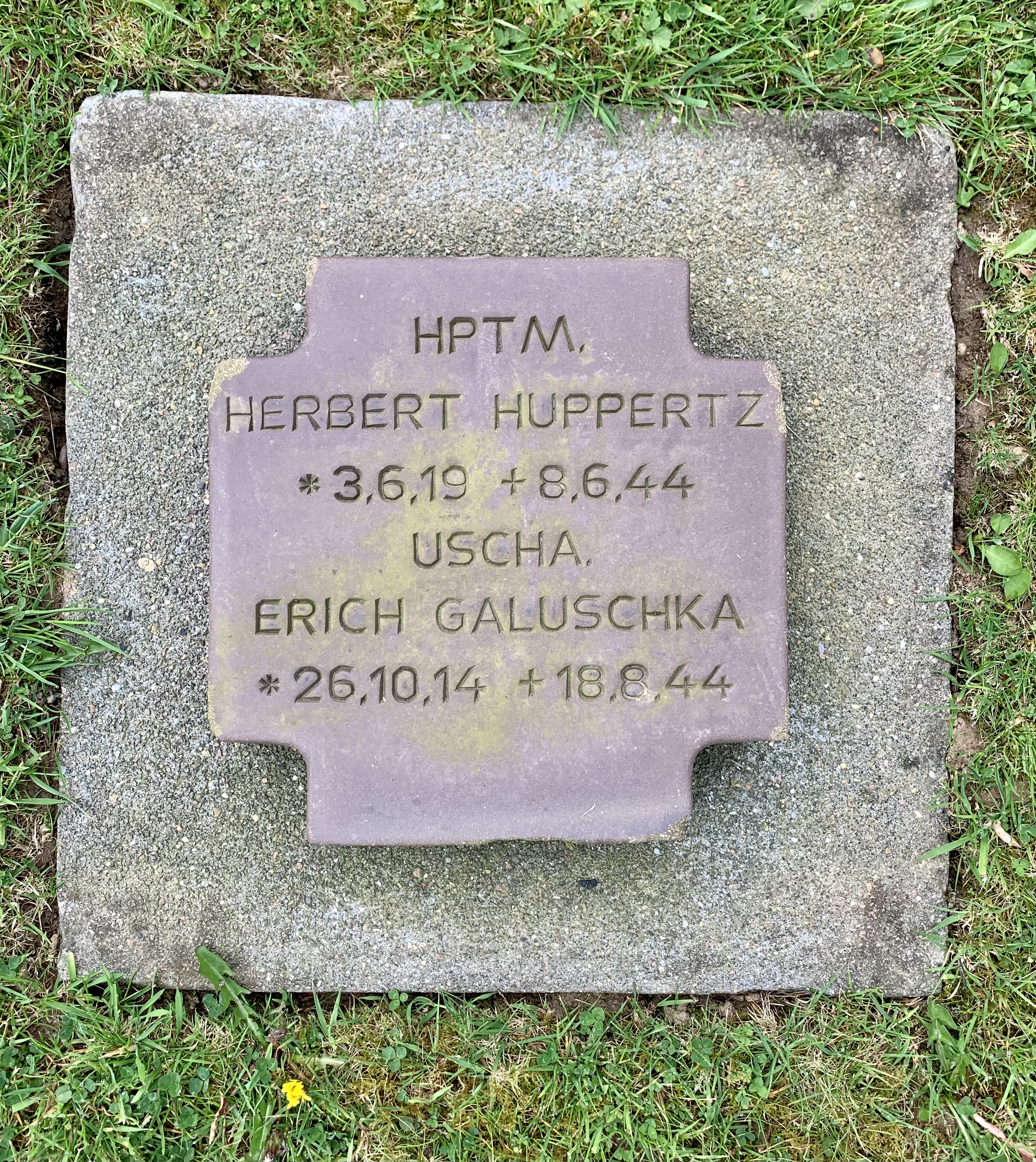
His grave at the La Cambe German war cemetery.

According to Bowman, Huppertz shot down five P-51 fighters on 6 June, making him an "ace-in-a-day" on D-Day. In contrast, authors Mathews and Foreman list him with five claims over three Typhoon, a Republic P-47 Thunderbolt and a P-51 fighter that day. Author Page states that 29 fighters from JG 2 attacked more than 24 P-47 fighters from USAAF 365th Fighter Group and Typhoon fighters from the RAF No. 183 Squadron. In this combat, German pilots claimed six aerial victories, including two Typhoon fighters by Huppertz, for the loss of one German aircraft. Allied records indicate that two P-47 and three Typhoon fighters were lost. On another mission, Huppertz encountered eight Typhoon fighters from RAF No. 164 Squadron, claiming his third Typhoon of the day shot down. That evening, he claimed two further aerial victories, a P-51 and a P-47 fighter shot down.

Two days later, during the Battle for Caen, Huppertz was shot down and killed in action in his Fw 190 A-8 (Werknummer 730440—factory number) by P-47 fighters near Cintheaux, in the combat area of Caen. He was replaced by Hauptmann Josef Wurmheller as commander of III. Gruppe. He was posthumously promoted to Major (major) and awarded the Knight's Cross of the Iron Cross with Oak Leaves (Ritterkreuz des Eisernen Kreuzes mit Eichenlaub) on 24 June, the 512th officer or soldier of the Wehrmacht so honored.

== Summary of career ==
=== Aerial victory claims ===
According to US historian David T. Zabecki, Huppertz was credited with 68 aerial victories. Spick also lists him with 68 aerial victories claimed in approximately 380 combat missions. Mathews and Foreman, authors of Luftwaffe Aces — Biographies and Victory Claims, researched the German Federal Archives and found records for 73 aerial victory claims, all of which confirmed. This number includes 28 on the Eastern Front and 45 on the Western Front, including 17 four-engined bombers.

Victory claims were logged to a map-reference (PQ = Planquadrat), for example "PQ 14 West 3867". The Luftwaffe grid map (Jägermeldenetz) covered all of Europe, western Russia and North Africa and was composed of rectangles measuring 15 minutes of latitude by 30 minutes of longitude, an area of about 360 square miles (930 km^{2}). These sectors were then subdivided into 36 smaller units to give a location area 3 km × 4 km (1.9 mi × 2.5 mi) in size.

Chronicle of aerial victories
This and the ♠ (Ace of spades) indicates those aerial victories which made Huppertz an "ace-in-a-day", a term which designates a fighter pilot who has shot down five or more airplanes in a single day. This and the ? (question mark) indicates information discrepancies listed by Prien, Stemmer, Rodeike, Bock, Mathews and Foreman.
Claim	Date	Time	Type	Location	Claim	Date	Time	Type	Location
– 6. Staffel of Jagdgeschwader 51 – Battle of France — 10 May – 25 June 1940
1	28 May 1940	13:08	Spitfire	northwest of Dunkirk					
– 6. Staffel of Jagdgeschwader 51 – At the Channel and over England — 26 June 1940 – 7 June 1941
2	7 July 1940	21:38	Spitfire	northwest of Dungeness	5	14 November 1940	16:02	Spitfire	Thames Estuary vicinity of Clacton-on-Sea
3	25 October 1940	13:30	Hurricane	Tunbridge Wells	6	11 March 1941	19:25	Hurricane	25 km (16 mi) north of Dungeness
4	29 October 1940	18:05	Spitfire	20 km (12 mi) northwest of London					
– 12. Staffel of Jagdgeschwader 51 – Operation Barbarossa — 22 June – August 1941
7	22 June 1941	16:30	SB-2		21	23 July 1941	12:55	Pe-2	
8	24 June 1941	09:30	DB-3		22	23 July 1941	18:20	Pe-2	
9	24 June 1941	09:50	DB-3		23	23 July 1941	18:25	Pe-2	
10	28 June 1941	16:03	DB-3		24	26 July 1941	09:05	DB-3	
11	29 June 1941	18:20	DB-3		25	26 July 1941	09:08	DB-3	
12	30 June 1941	13:12	R-10 (Seversky)		26	26 July 1941	09:10	DB-3	
13	2 July 1941	17:32	I-17 (MiG-1)		27	26 July 1941	18:15	Pe-2	
14	3 July 1941	19:35	DB-3		28	28 July 1941	07:47	DB-3	
15	7 July 1941	17:15	I-16		29	31 July 1941	19:15	I-18 (MiG-1)	
16	14 July 1941	12:40	DB-3		30	8 August 1941	15:35	DB-3	
17	14 July 1941	12:45	DB-3		31	8 August 1941	15:38	DB-3	
18	22 July 1941	10:25	I-153		32	9 August 1941	18:17	I-16	
19	22 July 1941	18:20	I-153		33	9 August 1941	19:00	SB-3	
20	22 July 1941	18:25	I-153						
– 9. Staffel of Jagdgeschwader 51 – Operation Barbarossa — August – 5 December 1941
34? (Note: According to Mathews and Foreman claimed with 12. Staffel of Jagdgeschwader 51.)	25 August 1941	16:10	I-16						
– 12. Staffel of Jagdgeschwader 1 – Defense of the Reich — January – March 1942
35? (Note: This claim is not listed by Mathews and Foreman.)	12 February 1942	—	Spitfire						
– 12. Staffel of Jagdgeschwader 1 – South and West Norway — March – November 1942
36	2 April 1942	—	Mosquito	Trondheim	37	10 April 1942	12:33	Spitfire	25 km (16 mi) east of Trondheim
– 3. Staffel of Jagdgeschwader 2 "Richthofen" – Western Front — 1 January – 20 April 1943
38? (Note: This claim with 3. Staffel of JG 2 is not listed by Prien, Stemmer, Rodeike and Bock. According to the authors, Huppertz was transferred to 10. Staffel of JG 2 on 20 April 1943. The authors do not list any claims attributed to Huppertz on 15 or 17 May, not with 3. Staffel nor with 10. Staffel.)	15 May 1943	17:10	Spitfire	7–8 km (4.3–5.0 mi) west of Bonnières	39?	17 May 1943	10:54	Spitfire	25 km (16 mi) south of Caen
– 10. Staffel of Jagdgeschwader 2 "Richthofen" – Western Front — 20 April – 1 July 1943
40	29 June 1943	16:37	P-38	PQ 14 West 3867; Saint-Nazaire					
– 8. Staffel of Jagdgeschwader 2 "Richthofen" – Western Front — 1 July – 1 October 1943
41	4 July 1943	13:10	B-17	PQ 14 West 4881; Saint-Nazaire	47	11 September 1943	18:07	Spitfire	PQ 05 Ost 0047; PQ 05 Ost 00483
42	5 July 1943	16:53	Whitley	PQ 14 West 5936	48	15 September 1943	19:43	B-17	2 km (1.2 mi) north of Saint-Germain-en-Laye
43	3 August 1943	20:30	Typhoon	north of Brest; PQ 14 West 5947	49	23 September 1943	09:29	B-17	20 km (12 mi) southwest of Fenmarch
44	27 August 1943	09:45	B-25	PQ 05 Ost 0031; PQ 05 Ost 0002	50	23 September 1943	18:39	B-17	north of Loudéac
45	30 August 1943	16:12	P-51	PQ 15 West 5067; PQ 15 West 5967	51	24 September 1943	17:00	Spitfire	PQ 05 Ost 2037; PQ 05 Ost 20378
46	31 August 1943	16:49	Spitfire	PQ 15 West 4075; PQ 15 West 4074					
– 12. Staffel of Jagdgeschwader 2 "Richthofen" – Western Front — 1 October – 1 December 1943
52	3 October 1943	18:33	Spitfire	Hécourt	54	26 November 1943	10:36	Spitfire	west of Saint-Sauveur
53	14 October 1943	16:00	B-17	west of Pont-à-Mousson					
– 11. Staffel of Jagdgeschwader 2 "Richthofen" – Western Front — 1 December 1943 – February 1944
55	1 December 1943	13:15	B-17	PQ 05 Ost 3271	60	7 January 1944	13:17	B-24	PQ 04 Ost N/198
56	30 December 1943	11:45	B-24	PQ 05 Ost 206, southeast of Cambrai	61	6 February 1944	10:40	B-17	PQ 05 Ost 208–307
57	30 December 1943	14:43	B-17	PQ 05 Ost 203 ND/NE	62	6 February 1944	13:00	P-38	PQ 04 Ost N/1984 northwest of Versailles
58	31 December 1943	14:53	B-17	PQ 15 West 3035	63	8 February 1944	10:30	B-17	PQ 05 Ost 203–204
59	7 January 1944	13:04	B-24	PQ 04 Ost N/2977–2978					
– Stab III. Gruppe of Jagdgeschwader 2 "Richthofen" – Western Front — February – 8 June 1944
64	20 February 1944	15:16	B-17	12 km (7.5 mi) northwest of Mons	70♠	6 June 1944	12:15	Typhoon	east of Caen
65	22 February 1944	12:20	B-24	PQ 05 Ost N/423; Helmond-Roosendaal	71♠	6 June 1944	18:20	Typhoon	east of Caen
66	16 March 1944	10:40	B-17	PQ 04 Ost N/4914; Saint-Dizier	72♠	6 June 1944	20:35	P-51	3 km (1.9 mi) northwest of Évreux
67	18 March 1944	14:50	B-17	southwest to west of Neu-Ulm	73♠	6 June 1944	20:59	P-47	10 km (6.2 mi) west-northwest of Évreux
68	18 March 1944	15:02	P-51	southwest to west of Neu-Ulm	74	7 June 1944	19:07	P-47	vicinity of Bayeux
69♠	6 June 1944	12:14	Typhoon	east of Caen					

=== Awards ===
- Iron Cross (1939)
  - 2nd Class (30 May 1940)
  - 1st Class (9 October 1940)
- German Cross in Gold on 26 December 1943 as Hauptmann in the 8./Jagdgeschwader 2
- Knight's Cross of the Iron Cross with Oak Leaves
  - Knight's Cross on 30 August 1941 as Leutnant and pilot in 12./Jagdgeschwader 51
  - 512th Oak Leaves on 24 June 1944 as Hauptmann and Gruppenkommandeur of III./Jagdgeschwader 2 "Richthofen"
