= Bonnières =

Bonnières may refer to:

- Bonnières, Oise, France
- Bonnières, Pas-de-Calais, France
- Bonnières-sur-Seine, Yvelines, France
