= Jagdgeschwader 2 =

- Unit insignia
- Active: 14 March 1936–1 May 1939 as Jagdgeschwader Richthofen, JG 132 and JG 131; 1 May 1939–8 May 1945 as JG 2
- Country: Nazi Germany
- Branch: Luftwaffe
- Type: Fighter Aircraft
- Role: Air superiority Fighter bomber Surgical strike Fighter escort
- Size: Air force wing
- Patron: Manfred von Richthofen
- Engagements: World War II

Commanders
- Notable commanders: Helmut Wick; Walter Oesau

Insignia
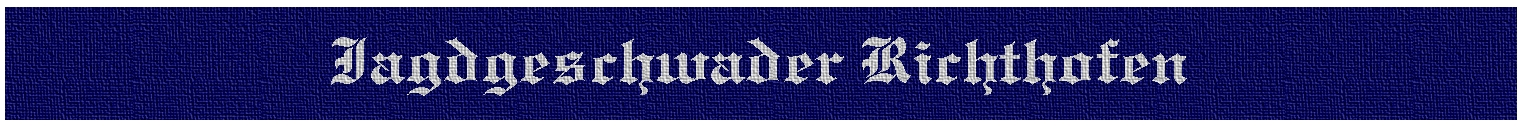
- Cuff title

Jagdgeschwader 2 (JG 2) "Richthofen" was a German fighter wing during World War II. JG 2 operated the Messerschmitt Bf 109 and Focke-Wulf Fw 190 single-seat, single-engine interceptor aircraft.

Named after World War I flying ace Manfred von Richthofen, the origins of the wing can be traced to 1934. Following the German invasion of Poland in September 1939 which began World War II, JG 2 served protecting the German border with France during the Phoney War. On 10 May 1940 it served in the Battle of Belgium and Battle of France. Thereafter it fought in the Battle of Britain and then remained on the English Channel front until September 1944. Elements of JG 2 fought in the latter stages of the North African Campaign, notably in the Battle of Tunisia in 1942 and 1943.

After the expulsion of German forces from France and Belgium following the Normandy landings, JG 2 served in the Defence of the Reich and fought on the Western Front, most notably at the Battle of the Bulge in the winter, 1944/45. JG 2 surrendered in May 1945.

Only three of JG 2's ten wartime Geschwaderkommodore survived World War II—four were killed while serving with JG 2, the highest fatality rate of any German fighter wing. JG 2 claimed 2,700 Allied aircraft destroyed at the cost of 750+ pilots killed or missing.

== Organisation ==
A Luftwaffe Geschwader (wing formation) was the largest homogenous flying formation. It typically was made up of three groups (Gruppen). Each group contained approximately 30 to 40 aircraft in three squadrons (Staffeln). A Jagdgeschwader could field 90 to 120 fighter aircraft. In some cases a wing could be given a fourth Gruppe. Each wing had a Geschwaderkommodore (wing commander) supporting by three Gruppenkommandeur (Group Commanders). Each squadron was commanded by a Staffelkapitän (squadron leader). The Staffel contained approximately 12 to 15 aircraft. The identification in records were different depending on the type of formation. A Gruppe was referred to in roman numerals, for example I./JG 2, while Staffeln were described with their number (1./JG 2). The wing could be subordinated to a Fliegerkorps, Fliegerdivision or Jagddivision (Flying Corps, Division and Fighter Division) all of which were subordinated to Luftflotten (Air Fleets). The use of Fliegerdivision became redundant and the description Fliegerkorps supplanted it until the use of Jagddivision later in the war.

=== Formation ===
The seizure of power by the Nazi Party in January 1933 triggered an era of military rearmament in Germany. Hermann Göring, one of leader Adolf Hitler's closest paladins, was appointed commander-in-chief of the Luftwaffe, the aerial warfare branch of the Wehrmacht. The Nazi leadership wanted to forge a link with Germany's military past to ensure continuity between the German Empire and the Third Reich. The air base at Döberitz (Fliegerruppe Döberitz) was renamed Jagdgeschwader Richthofen. Hitler attended the formation ceremony and after a Swastika-laden parade declared the first group of the Luftwaffe's official existence. There was a propaganda purpose to Hitler's attendance. Foreign Secretary John Simon, 1st Viscount Simon was visiting Berlin at the time, and though the Richthofen group was the only such fighter unit in the Luftwaffe, the Nazis were sure to exaggerate the size of their air force to the press and British officials. Hitler told Simon personally that the Luftwaffe had reached numerical parity with the Royal Air Force. A flypast was arranged for 19 March and on 10 April 1936 the unit was used to celebrate Göring's marriage. Jagdgeschwader Richthofen consisted of two Gruppen, and was used in the Remilitarization of the Rhineland, Hitler's first aggressive foreign policy move. Thereafter, the Richthofen groups became Jagdgeschwader 132. The first digit denoted the first unit of its type to be activated, the second the code for fighter aircraft and the last referred to Luftkreiskommando II (Air Command II), of the Berlin district. The wing was granted two groups, I. Gruppe (I./JG 132) and II. Gruppe (II./JG 132) which contained 1-3 and 4-6 Staffeln respectively. Major Johann Raithel, the first recognised commander, relinquished command to Oberst Gerd von Massow, who remained in command as Geschwaderkommodore until World War II.

Through the interwar period JG 132 was equipped with Arado Ar 65s, Arado Ar 68s and Heinkel He 51 biplanes. In mid-1937, and by the end of the summer, II./JG 132 began equipping with the Messerschmitt Bf 109 after testing with the B-1 and B-2 variant at Jüterbog. The Bf 109 initially had weak armament but the introduction of the cannon-armed E model resolved the issue and the type possessed superior high-altitude performance over conservative designs at the time. Following the Anschluss in March 1938, the Österreichische Luftstreitkräfte officer corps was screened for politically reliable personnel and some of the Austrian JaGschw 1 (Jagdgeschwader 1—Fighter Wing 1) pilots were sent to JG 132. JG 132 remained favoured by Göring who regularly asked it to host important visiting dignitaries. The majority of Jagdgruppe had Bf 109s by August 1938, but most were under strength and could field 26 fighters but many lacked radios. IV. Gruppe of JG 132, recently formed, was equipped with the Heinkel He 112. To complicate matters, JG 132 was renamed Jagdgeschwader 131 "Richthofen". On 1 May 1939 the Luftwaffe experienced a further reorganisation, and JG 131 was formally redesignated JG 2, an identity it retained for the rest of its existence.

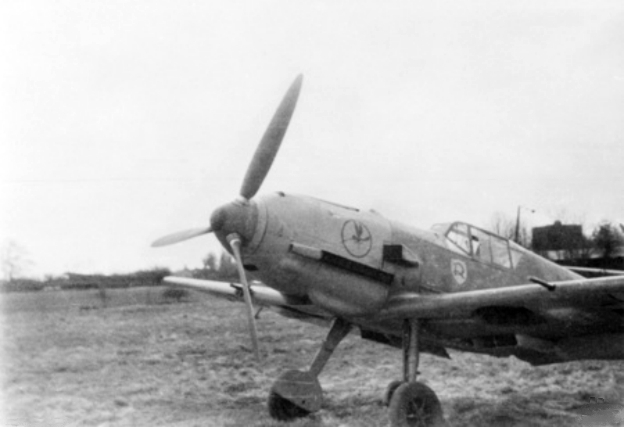
A JG 2 Bf 109 E-7 at Jever, 1940/41

Gerd von Massow created the Stabstaffel (headquarters unit) on 1 May 1939 at Döberitz and Obstleutnant Carl Vieck formed I. Gruppe nearby. Wolfgang Schellmann formed II. Gruppe at Zerbst on 12 December 1939. Erich Mix formed III. Gruppe on 16 March 1940 at Magdeburg, the last Gruppe to form. IV.(N)/JG 2, a night fighter unit was formed on 1 September 1939 under Oberleutnant Müller, and later Blumensaat, but the formation was short-lived and merged into 10.(N)/JG 26, 10.(N)/LG 2 to form a single entity which was eventually subsumed into NJG 1. The night fighters were a mixed group of Bf 109 Ds and Arado biplanes, even in September 1939. Bf 109 Es equipped I., II. and III. Gruppen at the beginning of the war. On 1 September 1939, Stab and I. Gruppe of JG 2 had 52 operational fighters including all three Bf 109s from the Stabstaffel. This figure was one short of full establishment considering JG 2 consisted of one Gruppe at the time.

== World War II ==
On 1 September 1939 the Wehrmacht initiated the German invasion of Poland in agreement with the secret protocol, the Nazi-Soviet Pact. The Soviet invasion of Poland followed on 17 September. JG 2 was retained for the aerial defence of Germany ("Defence of the Reich") but the lack of any threat by the Polish Air Force to Berlin led to an order for 1. Staffel, I. Gruppe, to fly to Prostken, East Prussia to take part. No aerial confrontations took place, and from 9 to 15 September, strafing attacks against road and rail targets were the main actions. The Staffel returned to Döberitz. JG 2 suffered its first casualties of the war, when two of the night fighter unit pilots were killed on 16/17 September, presumably in a collision.

JG 2 were assigned I./JG 77 and I./JG 76 while waiting for two Gruppen to be formed to give the wing a fighting strength of three. Both of the Gruppen were sent to Frankfurt Rhine-Main as the build-up in western Germany began in the Phoney War period. JG 26 frequently flew combat patrols or "free hunts". On 22 November 1939 the wing scored what is believed to be the first aerial victory of the war against the Groupe de Chasse II/4 Armée de l’Air. The freezing winter temperatures prohibited frequent flying, and I. Gruppe would not claim again until March 1940. Operation Weserübung, the invasions of Norway and Denmark ended the Phoney War. JG 2 were not involved in either, the burden of fighter operations with Bf 109s being carried out by JG 77. Oberst Harry von Bülow-Bothkamp took command of JG 2 on 1 April. Massow was appointed Jagdfliegerführer 3; Stab, I. and III. Gruppe were allotted to his command at Wiesbaden and based at Frankfurt while II. Gruppe was assigned to Jagdfliegerführer 1 at Jever and based at Nordholz. The Stabstaffel, I. and III. Gruppe were placed under the command of Luftflotte 3 at Frankfurt, under the leadership of Hugo Sperrle. II. Gruppe, with IV. Gruppe (Nacht), which had been elevated to Gruppe status briefly, were placed under the command of Albert Kesselring, Luftflotte 2. The former was based at Nordholz and the night fighters were based at Hopsten. II. Gruppe mustered 47 Bf 109s with 35 combat ready. IV. Gruppe had 30 from 31 Bf 109s operational plus 13 from 36 Ar 68s operational. I. Gruppe had 33 of 45 Bf 109s available while III. Gruppe had only 11 from 42 available for operations. This was the condition of JG 2 on 10 May 1940.

=== Battle of France ===
On 10 May 1940 the Wehrmacht put Fall Gelb into effect, allowing for the German invasion of Luxembourg, Battle of the Netherlands, Battle of Belgium and the initial phase of the Battle of France. Jagdführerflieger 1 contained 147 Bf 109 Es (103 operational) for the invasion of the Netherlands. JG 2 moved forward to airfields from its jumping off points along the Moselle. I. Gruppe moved to Bastogne with III. Gruppe, II. Gruppe moved to Hamminkeln near the Dutch border on 11 May. Massow's Jagdfliegerführer 3, containing JG 2, JG 53 and ZG 2 claimed 66 aircraft as it covered southern Belgium and northeastern France, with JG 2 primarily covering the Ardennes from 11 to 13 May. II. Gruppe of JG 2 fought in the defence of the Meuse bridgeheads upon the capture of Sedan. On 14 May, known in the Luftwaffe as "the day of the fighters" 4./JG 2 proved the most successful unit with three victories attributed to them. The fighting shattered the RAF Advanced Air Striking Force bomber fleet leaving bombing operations to the England-based No. 2 Group RAF. JG 53, supporting JG 2 and JG 77 and ZG 76, were the most successful, claiming 39 bombers destroyed. Jagdfliegerführer 3, reinforced by JG 26 and JG 27, flew 90 missions (814 sorties). III. Gruppe lost one fighter in the battles. Erich Rudorffer and Erich Leie filed their first claims in the Sedan region on this day—both men went on to be successful fighter pilots. After the intense operations on 14 May, the following day I. Gruppe claimed only one French reconnaissance aircraft. As Army Group A advance dto the English Channel, JG 2 followed. I. Gruppe moved to Beaulieu-en-Argonne. II. Gruppe moved to Peer for 72 hours and then Tirlemont, east of Brussels, where they stayed for over a week from mid to late May. By 1 June, I. and III. Gruppen had moved to Signy-le-Petit in preparation for Fall Rot, the final phase of the Western offensive. II. Gruppe flew fighter escort missions with I./JG 27 for Heinkel He 111 bombers on 16 May as the bombed Lille airfields. The bombers suffered no loss and 85 and 87 Squadrons attempted interception cost them two fighters in combat with 5./JG 2.

On 20 May, the Panzer Divisions reached the Channel north of Abbeville. As the German army fought the Battle of Boulogne and lay siege to Calais, the Luftwaffe began to make frequent contact with 11 Group, RAF Fighter Command. LG 1 lost six bombers on 21 and 22 May until assigned II./JG 2 for protection. Elsewhere, near Compiègne, Erich Mix, commanding III. Gruppe was shot down and wounded. JG 2 fought in the Battle of Dunkirk, to prevent the Dunkirk evacuation, by which time the Netherlands and Belgium were on the verge of collapse. On 26 May, I. Gruppe claimed 10 Supermarine Spitfires and one Bristol Blenheim. On 28 May, III. Gruppe claimed five Hawker Hurricanes and one Spitfire. The following day two Westland Wapiti were claimed by I. Gruppe. II. Gruppe claimed a Spitfire on 31 May and 2 June while I. Gruppe claimed a Westland Lysander on 1 June. Luftwaffe claims for 28 May totalled 26 fighters while RAF losses amounted to 13 and three damaged. On 31 May German fighter pilots claimed 22 fighters at least; Fighter Command records show just 12 losses.

JG 2 prepared for Fall Rot, the final phase in the Battle of France, now Belgium and the Netherlands had fallen. In preparation for this offensive, the Luftwaffe began Operation Paula, a strategic bombing operation against airfields and armaments factories in the Paris area. JG 2 claimed seven French fighters in defence of the bombers. The wing's former Geschwaderkommodore, Oberst Gerd von Massow, no leading Jagdfliegerführer 3, flew with the Bf 109s but was hit by anti-aircraft artillery. He baled out 12 mi (19 km) north of Paris and managed to evade capture. The following day, II. Gruppe was detached from Luftflotte 2 and transferred to Monceau-le-Vast, near Laon; I. and III. Gruppe were based nearby at Couvron, and had been since 1 June. JG 2 could now field three Gruppen as a complete entity. I./JG 76 was detached and later became II./JG 54. From 5–6 June JG 2 experienced its most successful period in France. The pilots claimed 41 French aircraft for the loss of one pilot. The air battles inflated JG 2s total to 200 enemy aircraft, though this was a ten percent over–claim. Helmut Wick emerged as one of the Geschwader top scorers of the campaign during Fall Rot. At this time, the JG 2 Geschwader headquarters unit moved to the chateau in the town of Beaumont-le-Roger, which was the home of the Duchesse de Magenta, which served as Geschwader headquarters until it was totally destroyed by B-17 Flying Fortress' on 28 June 1943. On 13 June all three Gruppen moved to Oulchy-le-Château mid-way between Reims and Paris. On this day, another JG 2 personality, Egon Mayer achieved his first victory. Three days later, the entire wing moved to Marigny, 50 miles (80 km) south. Hauptmann Jürgen Roth was transferred to the Reichsluftfahrtministerium (RLM) on 22 June 1940 due to poor health. Hauptmann Henning Strümpell replaced him.

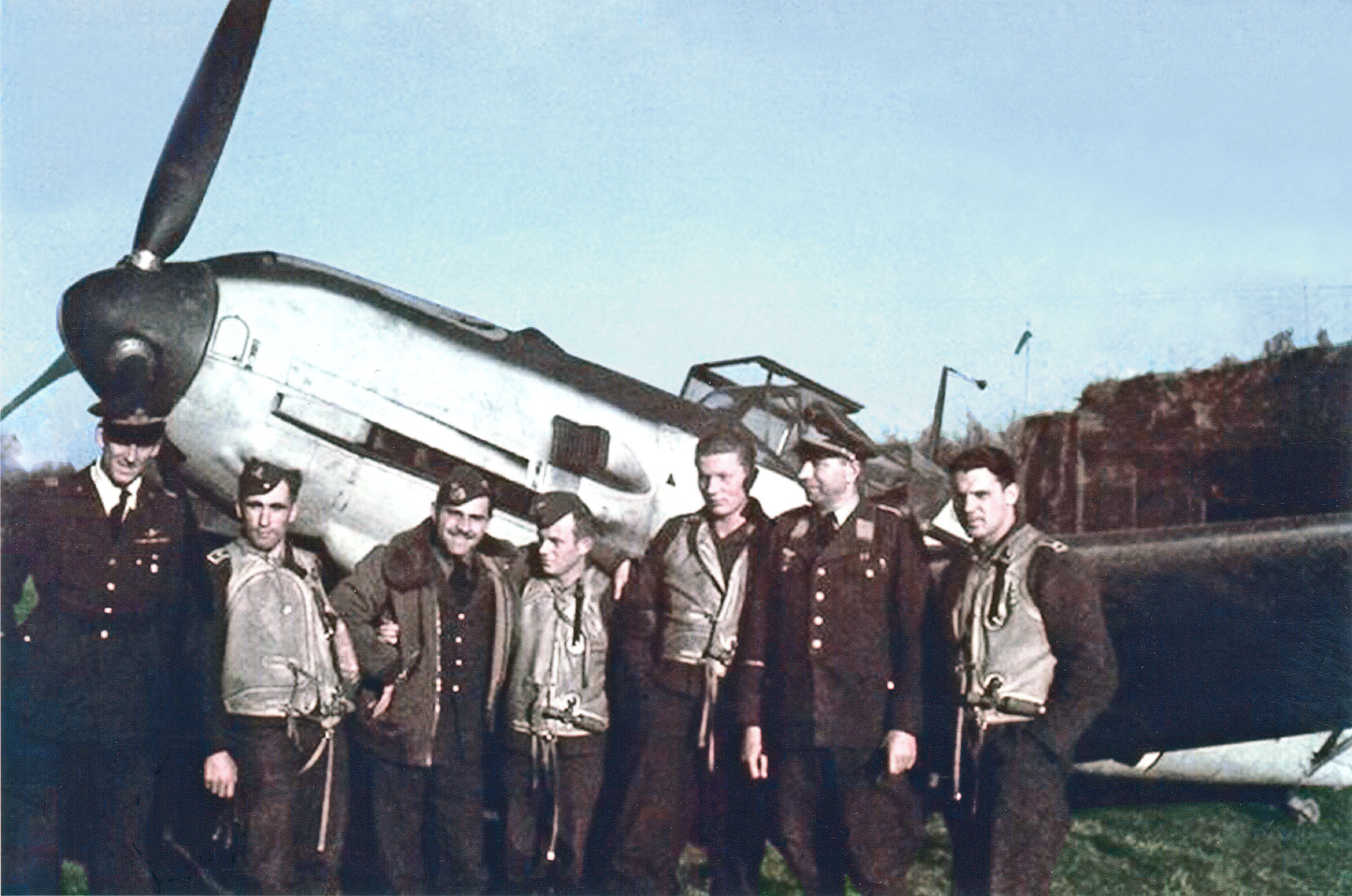
Bf 109E-3 in typical camouflage of the Western campaign; RLM 65 blue sides with RLM 02 grey-green and RLM 71 dark green along the top

The Armistice of 22 June 1940 ended the French campaign. JG 2 suffered few losses during the fighting and subsequent operations. During the course of 1940, JG 2 reported just 36 casualties among its pilots. Only III. Gruppe returned to Germany, at Frankfurt. It spent a month there before returning to France. In the immediate aftermath, II. and III. Gruppen moved to Évreux, near Paris, before their replacement at the site by I./KG 54. Stab and I. Gruppe moved permanently to Beaumont-le-Roger. At the beginning of operations over the United Kingdom, all but III. Gruppe were based at Beaumont-le-Roger. III./JG 2 were based at Le Havre.

=== Battle of Britain ===
The Churchill Government rejected Hitler's peace overtures, and the Nazi leadership resolved to end the war militarily. Operation Sea Lion, a proposed amphibious invasion of Britain was planned. Air superiority was an essential prerequisite to its success, and the Oberkommando der Luftwaffe eventually outlined a broad plan for achieving it; Operation Eagle Attack. The gradual escalation of the air war became known as the Battle of Britain, beginning with a concerted effort by the Luftwaffe to clear the English Channel of shipping and bring Fighter Command. The first phase of the Battle of Britain was called the "Kanalkampf". JG 2 could fly 105 Bf 109s at the start of operations. The Stabstaffel had all three of its fighters operational; I. Gruppe 32 from 34, II. Gruppe 28 from 36, and III. Gruppe 28 from 36. Helmut Wick, the highest claiming German pilot of the Battle of Britain claimed a first victory on 17 July; the 64 Squadron pilot was wounded. There were no reported losses for JG 2 from 1 July–10 August. On 11 August, large battles developed around convoy Booty, Agent and Arena. JG 2 reported eight Bf 109s lost. III. Gruppe was charged specifically with fighter escort. I. Gruppe suffered the loss of one pilot killed and one wounded, II. Gruppe lost one Staffelkapitän killed and another pilot missing. III. Gruppe were hardest hit, losing four Bf 109s, two killed, one missing and one pilot rescued. 64 Squadron and 87 Squadron were some of their opponents. 64 reported one Spitfire damaged, but 87 Squadron lost two Hurricanes and one damaged; one pilot was killed, one wounded.

On 12 August 1940, the Channel battles subsided and the Germans began the offensive against RAF Fighter Command; the day's operations ended in severe damage to one JG 2 fighter in an accident. Adlertag proper began on 13 August. JG 2 were known to be in action in the morning for I. Gruppe suffered damage to one Bf 109 in combat with 43 Squadron, while the Gruppe suffered damage to a second in combat with 609 Squadron in the late afternoon. Only 43 Squadron reported losses—two Hurricanes—with their pilots safe. Another source asserts JG 2 suffered one total loss. On 15 August the Luftwaffe sent all three of its Luftflotten—2, 3 and 5 to targets in the northeast and south of England to catch Fighter Command off-guard. The day was known to the Luftwaffe as "Black Thursday". The wing fought in the 16 and 18 August battles. On 16 August II. Gruppe suffered two destroyed and one damaged in combat with 601 Squadron. On the 18th, II. Gruppe ran into 601 Squadron again, losing one Bf 109 and another damaged. 601 reported one damaged on the first day, and two lost on the 18th—both pilots were killed on the latter date. The battles occurred as JG 2 acted as distant escort for Junkers Ju 87 Stuka dive-bombers from Sturzkampfgeschwader 77 and Sturzkampfgeschwader 3. The bench-mark for the Knight's Cross of the Iron Cross, a higher award than the Iron Cross, in August 1940 was 20 enemy aircraft destroyed. Helmut Wick duly became one of eight JG 2 men to receive the award in 1940, on 27 August. On 25 August, JG 2 claimed its 250th aerial victory, among 40 claimed by German fighter pilots that day—though this was an exaggeration. Oberst Harry von Bülow-Bothkamp, commanding JG 2, was awarded the Knight's Cross for JG 2s performance. Fighter Command's total losses on 25 August were 18 destroyed and two damaged in action with the enemy. From 19–31 August JG 2 reported the loss of nine Bf 109s and two damaged. Three pilots were killed, two reported missing, three wounded and one taken prisoner. On the last day of August Hans "Assi" Hahn and Erich Rudorffer submitted claims for a victory.

In late August, JG 2 began moving to Pas de Calais airfields at Mardyck and Oye-Plage. During the first ten days on these airfields between Calais and Dunkirk, JG 2 claimed close to 100 RAF fighters destroyed. September began with continued attacks on RAF airfields. On day four, Kurt Bühligen's—future JG 2 commanding officer—career with JG 2 began after a claim against a Hurricane. Hans "Assi" Hahn and Werner Machold became the next recipients of the Knight's Cross for reaching the obligatory total of 20 aerial victories during the month. Wolfgang Schellmann was similarly honoured for his leadership, while I. Gruppe, recognised as the most successful in the Luftwaffe. Bothkamp was replaced by Schellmann as Geschwaderkommodore. Karl-Heinz Greisert, an eight-victory pilot succeeded him in II. Gruppe. Within days, Helmut Wick took command of I. Gruppe from Strümpell. At the end of September, Dr. Erich Mix—perhaps the last World War I pilot still operational—was replaced as III. Gruppe by Hauptmann Otto Bertram. JG 2 recorded four pilots missing and one wounded in the first six days of September. The following day, Göring ordered an attack on Greater London, beginning The Blitz. German intelligence wrongly assumed Fighter Command to be near exhaustion and that an offensive against the capital would bring the last of its reserves into battle. Bombing London opened the possibility of destroying vital rail networks, shipping, supplies, and damage civilian morale by demonstrating London's vulnerability to air power. The raids from 7–14 September seemed to confirm this view; none encountered the kind of resistance that characterised the fighting in August. Hitler gave his consent to a continued assault. The next day's operations became known as the Battle of Britain Day; generally regarded as the climax of the battle for air superiority. JG 2s condition on 7 September was two Bf 109s from the Stabstaffel operational from three; five from 24 operational in I. Gruppe, four from 18 in II. Gruppe and 11 from 19 in III. Gruppe. All of the wing's units had withdrawn from the Pas de Calais back to Beaumont-le-Roger and Le Havre and were not involved in the day's fighting. JG 2s absence from the southeast of England in the latter half of September, and reassignment from Luftlfotte 2 back to 3, caused their involvement in the final phase of the Battle of Britain to be minimal—just four enemy aircraft were claimed for an equal number of losses. JG 2 finished September operating over Weymouth, Dorset; in combat with 504 Squadron, the British purportedly destroyed nine Bf 109s. Even though most of the battle occurred over water, only one II. Gruppe Bf 109 was found on a beach.

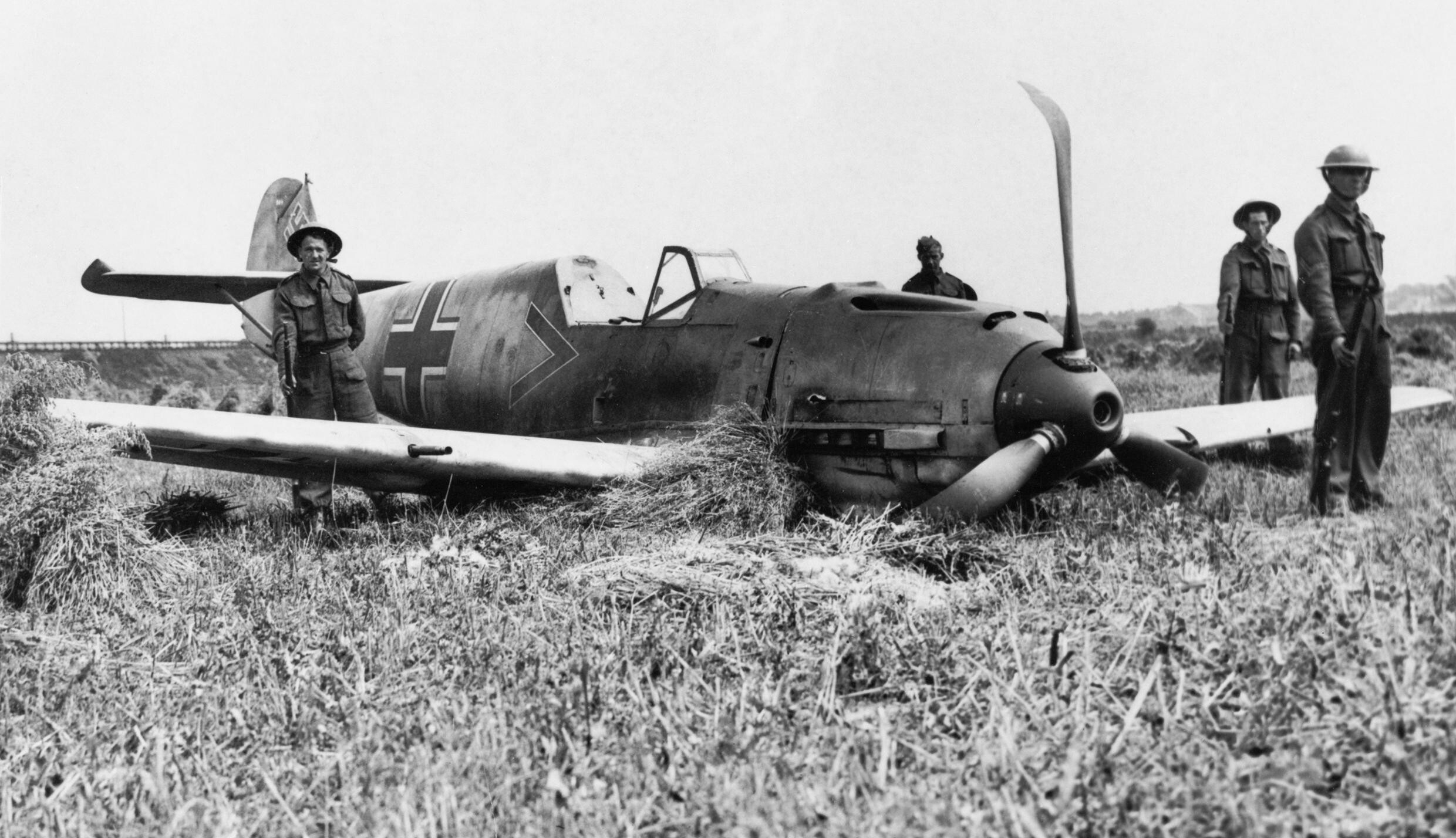
Messerschmitt Bf 109 E-1 of Oberleutnant Paul Temme, Adjutant of I./JG 2, crashed near Shoreham aerodrome, Sussex, 13 August 1940

JG 2 returned to the skies between the Isle of Portland and Selsey Bill. On 26 September the pilots claimed 12 RAF fighters supporting an attack on the Spitfire factory at Woolston, Southampton. Over the next week they claimed another 24. I. Gruppe claimed 11 Hurricanes flying as bomber escort near Bournemouth on 5 October. Fighter Command suffered two losses over Shaftesbury and Swanage; the three remaining fighters reported lost in combat on that day occurred in the southeast of England; over Kent, Dover and Canterbury. Only nine Hurricanes were involved in the air battle—all from 607—but each one suffered damage. Fighter Command records show only one Hurricane from this squadron was destroyed; its pilot parachuted to safety. According to another source two more were forced down. By October, the Battle of Britain had become a "fighter-bomber offensive". The "Jabo" attacks were intended to show the Luftwaffe could still bomb London in daylight. On 28 October Otto Bertram, commanding III. Gruppe learned that his second brother, a night fighter pilot had been killed in action the previous night. Along with his first, killed with JG 27 over England, he was removed and sent to a staff posting in accordance with Luftwaffe regulations. Hans "Assi" Hahn replaced him.

Major Helmut Wick took command of JG 2 from 20 October. Wick, with Werner Mölders and Adolf Galland, were the leading Luftwaffe fighter pilots. Their exploits were national news in Germany. Wick was exposed to international journalists and appeared in Life magazine. He was also used in Der Adler (Eagle—the Luftwaffe's weekly magazine) and Berliner Illustrirte Zeitung. Wick's wing was chosen to stage southward, to provide an aerial escort to Hitler on his personal train as it journeyed to the French-Spanish border for the Meeting at Hendaye with Francisco Franco. Wick's leadership of JG 2 lasted just 39 days. On 28 November 1940, after claiming his 56th aerial victory to lead the claim charts, he was shot down and killed by a Spitfire. One source attributes Wick's demise to combat fatigue—the psychological and physical effects of combat fatigue earned the Channel area of operations the nickname Kanalkrankheit (lit. 'channel sickness'). Wick was the first serviceman with the Knight's Cross and Oak Leaves to be killed in action. Hauptmann Karl-Heinz Greisert replaced him and led the wing until February 1941, when Wilhelm Balthasar was appointed Wick's permanent replacement. JG 2 began a hiatus from operations, exemplified by the failure to appoint an immediate successor to Wick.

=== Channel Front ===
The bulk of JG 2 remained on the Channel coast under the command of Luftflotte 3, where it operated uninterrupted for the next four years following the Battle of Britain, save for a brief transfer by one Gruppe to North Africa. RAF Fighter Command and its new commanding officers Sholto Douglas and Trafford Leigh-Mallory wished to take the offensive into France and Belgium in 1941. Termed the "lean towards France", Leigh-Mallory, No. 11 Group RAF, began the Circus offensive in January 1941. The German-led invasion of the Soviet Union, Operation Barbarossa, in June 1941, provided a greater strategic rationale for applying pressure to the Luftwaffe in Western Europe. On 9 January 1941, Circus Number 1 was flown by 60 fighters over northern France. The Germans ignored them, using the same tactics as Keith Park in the Battle of Britain. RAF Bomber Command was shortly employed as bait to bring the Luftwaffe to battle. There were few high-value strategic targets in France and Belgium within range of escorting Spitfires. A follow-up Circus with small bomber formations and strong fighter escort began on 10 January as the policy's second element began. These were followed by "Rodeo" [massed fighter sweeps] and "Ramrod" operations [standard fighter-escort for bombers]. Mallory was revisiting Hugh Trenchard's World War I policy.

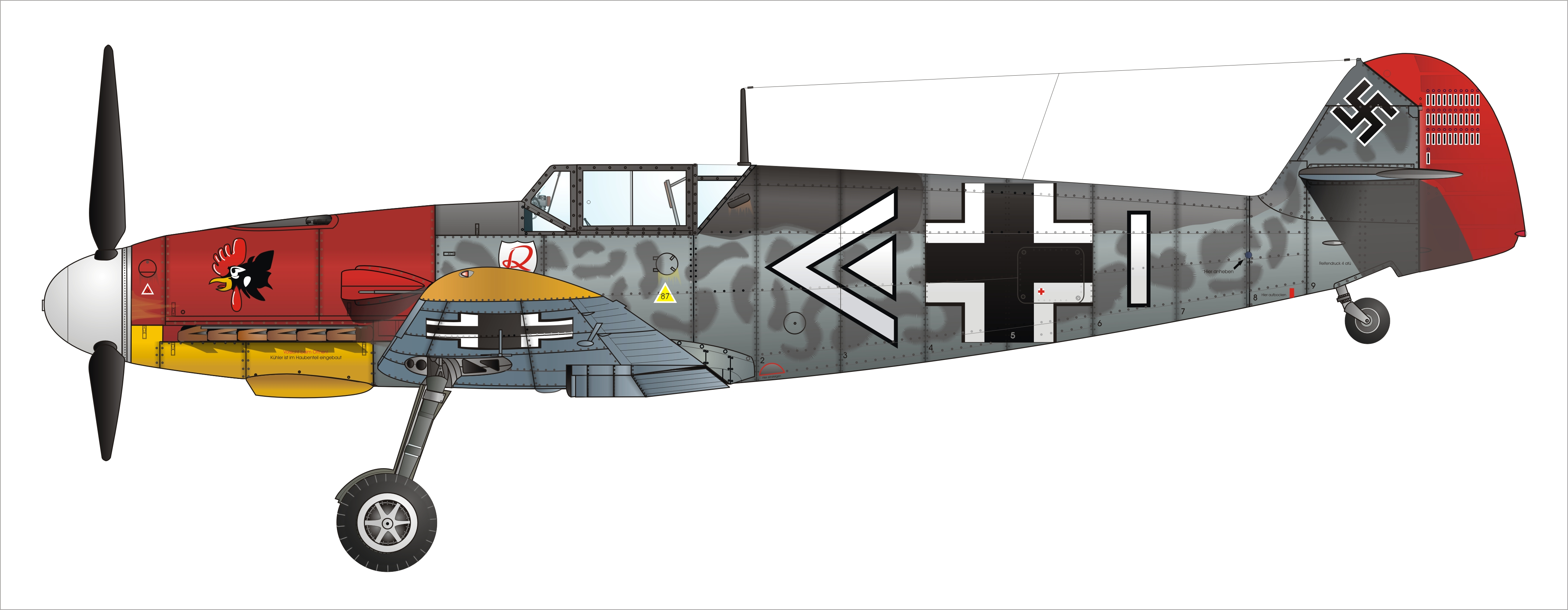
Messerschmitt Bf 109 F-2, Hans Hahn, 1941

From January to June 1941, JG 2 and JG 26 were supported by other fighter wings. Jagdgeschwader 1 (JG 1—1st Fighter Wing), JG 51, Jagdgeschwader 52 (JG 52—52nd Fighter Wing), Jagdgeschwader 53 (JG 53—53rd Fighter Wing) and LG 2 were among those credited with successes against the Circus operations. From mid-1941 through to 1942, JG 26 were fully occupied with defending German military targets in northern France and Belgium from RAF incursions. JG 26 defended airspace east of the Seine to the Dutch border, while JG 2 covered west of the demarcation line. The majority of the operations conducted were defensive but offensive "jabo" operations were conducted until the beginning of 1943 when they could no longer be spared for attack missions. On 3 July 1941, JG 2 lost another commander killed when Wilhelm Balthasar was shot down and crashed. The Geschwaderkommodore was buried in the same plot as his father, a soldier killed in World War I. Oberstleutnant Walter Oesau replaced Balthasar, and commanded JG 2 for the next two years. On 9 June, 32-victory ace Machold was shot down by a British destroyer and was captured. Machold's E-7 was the last Emil lost by III./JG 2, for the Geschwader had, by this time, been almost completely re-equipped with the new and improved Bf 109 F. Over a two-day period, JG 2 claimed heavily against RAF formations. On 23 July the wing claimed 29 British aircraft, while JG 26 claimed 10. Actual RAF losses were 15 in total. The following day, JG 2 lost eight and two damaged, six pilots killed or missing, and two wounded opposing Circus 61, supporting Operation Sunrise, to Brest. They claimed 18 bombers. The operation targeted the German ships Scharnhorst, Gneisenau and the cruiser Prinz Eugen had docked in March and June 1941 after completing Atlantic missions. Fighter Command reported four dead, three captured and one wounded on the raid—one was downed by ground-fire, two are confirmed to have been lost in action with Bf 109s, the cause of the remaining losses are undetermined. JG 2 claimed three, while their neighbouring JG 26 claimed five fighters. RAF Bomber Command occasionally risked its newer four-engine heavy bombers attacking Brest in 1941, but the raids were rarely successful. Chief of the Air Staff Charles Portal, noted that from 10 January and 15 April 750 sorties had been "thrown" at the German ships in fruitless attempts to sink them. JG 2 claimed 21 bombers in the action, along with the three fighters. 33 Spitfires were claimed in October 1941, alone. On 8 November 1941, Fighter Command flew a last "Circus" operation of the year; though other types of mission were flown during the month and December. The RAF lost 17 Spitfires—JG 2 claimed 10. Post-war analysis attributes at least eight to the neighbouring JG 26, one to ground-fire, one to fuel starvation and another to mechanical failure.

1941 was a difficult year for Fighter Command. In the period 14 June–4 July Fighter Command lost 80 fighters and 62 pilots, while the two German wings lost 48 Bf 109s and 32 pilots; 2:1 in the Luftwaffe's favour. The impact of Fighter Command's massive daylight operations was offset by the tactical deployment of German units which enjoyed radar-based guidance. They skillfully used this to outweigh their numerical inferiority. 32 Freya radar and 57 Würzburg radar sets were employed from Heligoland to the Bay of Biscay. Fighter Command flew 6,875 sorties from January to June and lost 112 aircraft—57 in June. From July to December this increased to 20,495 with 416 losses. The pressure grew on JG 2, allotted to Jagdfliegerführer 3, JG 1, assigned to Jagdfliegerführer 1 and JG 26. There were 4,385 "alarmstarts" in July 1941 and another 4,258 in August. September saw a reduction to 2,534 and to 2,553 in October before falling to 1,287. Nevertheless, the fighter wings still retained 430 fighters on 27 September 1941. August proved the costliest to the Luftwaffe in the second half of the year with 42 losses which fell to 18 in September and 15 in October. JG 2 and JG 26 claimed approximately 950 British aircraft destroyed in 1941, with barely 150 fighters available at any one time for the loss of 236–103 in aerial combat. Fighter Command lost 849 fighters in total in 1941 and claimed 775, a considerable exaggeration. Successful pilots emerged in 1941; Erich Leie, Rudolf Pflanz and Egon Mayer emerged as high-claiming pilots [none survived the war]. Siegfried Schnell was another pilot who had a successful record against the Spitfire. Kurt Bühligen, future Geschwaderkommodore was awarded the Knight's Cross in September 1941 along with Josef Wurmheller.

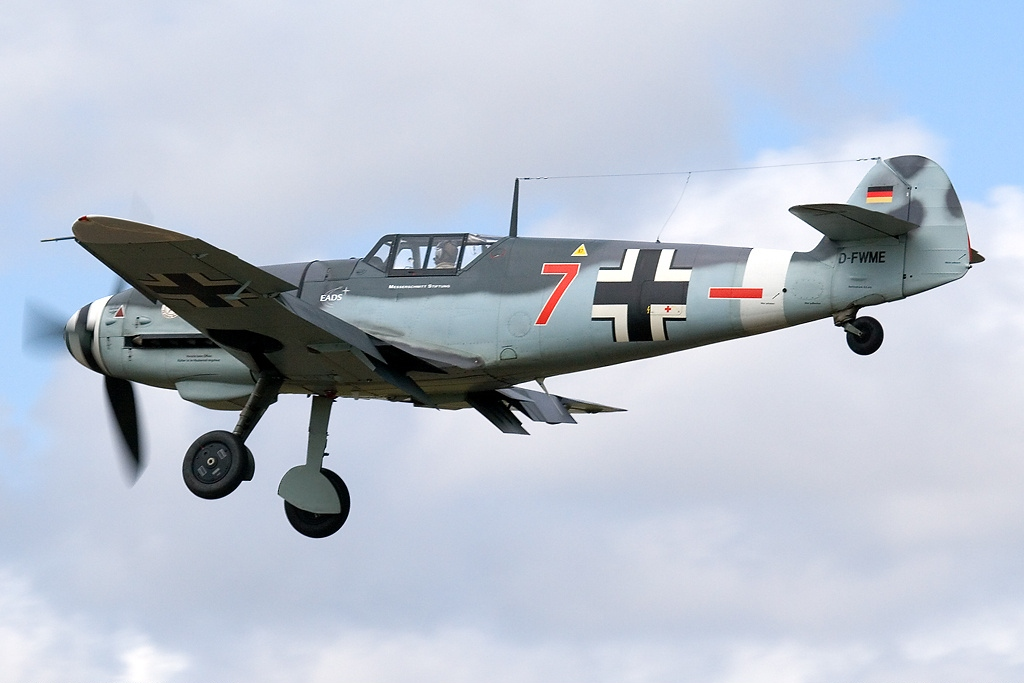
Bf 109G-4 modern build—JG 2 operated the G model in 1942/43

During the winter, 1941/1942, the Stabstaffel moved from Beaumont-le-Roger to Saint-Pol-de-Léon, then to Brest–Guipavas. In February 1942, it moved eastward, to Caen, then Marck, Pas-de-Calais. I. Gruppe moved to Brest in mid-1941, before returning eastward to Caen and Marck in February 1942. II. Gruppe remained at Abbeville until the end of 1941, and then made a series of transfers similar to the other Gruppen. III. Gruppe moved to Mont-de-Marsan, Bernay, Rocquancourt, Liegescourt, St. Pol-Brias, Théville and Coxyde. The purpose of the moved to the French Atlantic coast was to provide air cover for the Kriegsmarine heavy ships in dock at Brest. In February 1942 the navy executed Operation Cerberus. The Luftwaffe supported the "Channel Dash" with Operation Donnerkeil. 252 fighters from JG 1, JG 2 and JG 26 were ordered into the operation. The night fighter unit I./NJG 1 flew 19 sorties, protecting the ships during the night, until replaced by JG 2 at 08:00. The British aerial response began as JG 26 relieved JG 2. Successive waves of JG 2's fighters—each 16-aircraft strong—maintained a series of 30-minute vigils over the ships. Fighter Command and Fleet Air Arm forces were slow to react, but appeared just as JG 2 handed over responsibility to Gerhard Schöpfel's JG 26. Lieutenant Commander Eugene Esmonde, acting as Squadron Leader, No. 825 Squadron FAA took off with his Fairey Swordfish formation to attack the ships. Squadron Leader Brian Kingcome's No. 72 Squadron RAF offered their only protection but were overwhelmed by the German fighters. All the Swordfish were shot down and Esmonde was awarded the Victoria Cross. Only five of the original eighteen Swordfish crew survived. JG 2 made five claims, JG 26, three. The German ships claimed an exaggerated total of 10.

In March 1942, just as Fighter Command resumed its offensive, JG 2 was in the process of equipping with the Focke-Wulf Fw 190. All three Gruppen began conversion to the Fw 190 by May. The Stabstaffel retained the Bf 109 F-4 until August 1942. In late April, Stab and I. Gruppe of JG 2 based at Beaumont le Roger, Liegescourt and Triqueville under Jagdfliegerführer 3 began conversion from the Fw 190 A to the Bf 109 G-2. In late 1942, there was a move to revert completely back to the Bf 109 given the demand for the Fw 190 in other theatres, but this was rescinded. Some of the Gruppen maintained mixed Staffeln of Bf 109s and Fw 190s (namely Fw 190 As and Bf 109 G-6s) into 1943. II. Gruppe partially converted to the Bf 109 G for some months in early to mid-1943 and operated both the 109 and 190 in southern France upon its return from North Africa. The Fw 190 proved immediately superior in all but turning radius to the Spitfire V, the standard RAF fighter at the time. Air Vice Marshal Johnnie Johnson remarked "Yes, the 190 was causing us real problems at this time. We could out-turn it, but you couldn't turn all day. As the number of 190s increased, so the depth of our penetrations decreased. They drove us back to the coast really." Into 1943, I. Gruppe were operating both the Bf 109 and Fw 190, but soon fully attained the Fw 190 for efficiency. At this time, JG 2 was spread throughout Normandy and Brittany. Stab/JG 2 [headquarters staff] remained at Beaumont-le-Roger with two serviceable fighters from four; the Stabsschwarm [command flight] was at Ligescourt with 6 (5 operational); I. Gruppe (excluding 1. and 2. Staffel) were at Triqueville with 12 (6); 1. and 2. Staffel at Ligescourt with 18 (14). The Fw 190 units were II. Gruppe (excluding 6. Staffel) at Beaumont-le-Roger with 34 (27); 6. Staffel at Triqueville with 12 (11); III. Gruppe (excluding 7. and 8. Staffel) at Cherbourg-Théville with 13 (12); 7. Staffel at Morlaix with 10 (8); 8. Staffel at Saint-Brieuc with 12 (8) and a final Bf 109 F unit, the Jabo 10. Staffel at Caen with 19 (14). The later unit claimed the sinking of 20 vessels in the Channel from March to June 1942, some 63,000 BRT. This unit was renamed 13./SKG 10.

In the first half of April 1942, Fighter Command suffered four times the casualties of the Luftwaffe. Sholto Douglas, commanding Fighter Command, considered abandoning deep-penetration Circus operations but then ordered a large mission "Super Circus" on 24 April. On 1 June, nine Spitfires from the RAF Debden wing were shot down with their commanding officer. No. 403 Squadron RCAF lost seven out of 12 fighters. From 30 May to 4 June JG 2 claimed 50 RAF aircraft destroyed. On 13 June 1942, the Air Ministry informed Douglas the RAF was losing the current battle. In four months to the end of June, the RAF lost 264 fighters to all causes, the Luftwaffe, 58. II. and III. Gruppe moved to St Pol-Bryas at the beginning of May while I. Gruppe moved to Brest. From 21 to 25 June the latter combination claimed 55 enemy aircraft.

By 17 July Douglas acknowledged that his command was in an inferior position. The reason for the year's reversals was that most of the 332 German fighters on the Channel Front were Fw 190s. The RAF came to appreciate this fully on 23 June 1942, when Armin Faber, JG 2, accidentally landed in Britain and provided the British with a fully operational Fw 190. The situation was not helped by the technical problems with the new Hawker Typhoon. The Spitfire IX reached the frontline in June, to restore parity at altitudes below 7,600 m (24,900 ft) and to prove a higher performing fighter at greater altitudes. The Germans anticipated the limits of the Fw 190 As performance at higher altitudes, and began deploying Bf 109 Gs to provide high cover. JG 2 lost a number of experienced pilots in the battles; on 4 May Hauptmann Ignaz Prestele, commanding II. Gruppe was killed, and on 30 July Rudolf Pflanz, commanding the high-altitude Bf 109 G-1 11. Staffel, was shot down. Of note, commander Oesau engaged elements of the Augsburg raid in April 1942, as it overflew his headquarters and Stab/JG 2 claimed shot down some Avro Lancasters. Up to four of the small force are believed to have been downed near Paris.

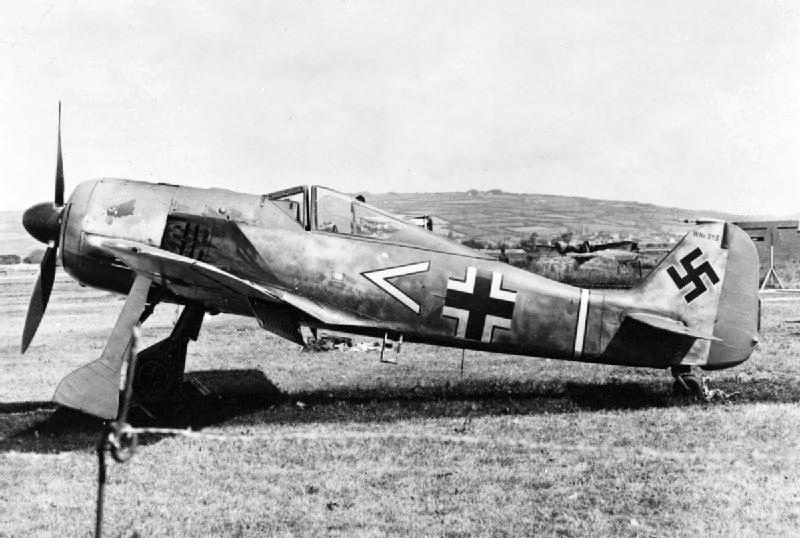
Armin Faber, 11./JG 2, landed in error in England, June 1942. Faber presented the RAF with a combat ready Fw 190 for evaluation

In August 1942 the British and Canadians carried out Operation Jubilee, a raid on Dieppe harbour. Fighter, Bomber and RAF Coastal Commands supported the Commando landings. JG 2 was based in northwest France under the command of Jafü 3. Stab and I. Gruppe were at Triqueville, II. Gruppe was at Beamont-le-Roger and III. Gruppe at Cherbourg-Maupertus. 11. (Höhen) Staffel, with high altitude Bf 109 G-1s acted independently at Ligescourt, nominally under the command of JG 26. The RAF did not succeed in forcing the Luftwaffe into a pitched-battle over the beachhead and Fighter Command in particular, suffered heavy casualties. The British claimed to have inflicted heavy casualties on the Luftwaffe, the balance sheet showed the reverse; Allied aircraft losses amounted to 106, including 88 RAF fighters (70 Spitfires were lost to all causes) and 18 bombers, against 48 Luftwaffe aircraft lost. Included in that total were 28 bombers, half of them Dornier Do 217s from KG 2. The two German Jagdgeschwader units had the following results: JG 2 lost 14 Fw 190s with eight pilots killed and JG 26 lost six Fw 190s with six pilots killed. The Spitfire Squadrons, 42 with Mark Vs, and only four with Mark IXs were tasked with close air support, fighter escort and air-superiority missions. The exact number of Spitfires lost to the Fw 190 Gruppen is unknown. The Luftwaffe claimed 61 of the 106 RAF machines lost, which included all types: JG 2 claimed 40 and JG 26 claimed 21. Wing Commander Minden Blake was among the notable British casualties. the 130 Squadron leader was captured after being shot down by a Fw 190.

In 1942, JG 1, JG 2 and JG 26 began to experience a new opponent on the Channel Front. The United States Army Air Force (USAAF) Eighth Air Force began carrying out bombing operations over France and the Low Countries. The B-17 Flying Fortress quickly earned a reputation, almost immediately, of absorbing heavy damage and remaining airborne. In 1942, a typical interception of this type by Fw 190 pilots was difficult. The American bombers flew at altitudes in excess of 8,000 m (26,000 ft), and lacking a super-charger, the Fw 190s struggled to reach altitudes even with considerable warning from American radio/signals traffic. At that altitude, Fw 190A-2s had only slight speed advantages over the B-17. The Revi gun sights were set for fighter, not anti-bomber combat, and set for a range of 100 m (330 ft). The large bombers loomed in quickly long before the German fighters had reached effective range encouraging premature firing. The psychological impact of the massed-firepower of American bombers encouraged inexperienced German pilots to break off too soon from the classic stern-attack position to cause any damage. This anxiety among green pilots heightened through the use of the .50 calibre guns on American aircraft. They out-ranged the MG 151/20 cannon and MG 17 machine gun on German fighters, and in a slow-closing chase the German pilot often had to sit through several minutes of American gunfire before they got within effective firing range of their own armament. American gunners saturated the air with tracers to disrupt or ward off attacks. In response, Galland organised a test group to experiment with air-to-air rockets and heavy calibre cannon to remedy the situation.

For the Luftwaffe, the winter, 1942/43, was spent increasing the engine and firepower of their fighters. Weights rose, and engine power had to follow to keep pace. In order to increase compression ratios in their engines, and unable to do so through the use of high-strength alloys and high-octane fuel lacking in Germany, engineers opted for chemical enhancements. The Bf 109 G-1 high-altitude fighter, powered by the DB 605A was given the GM-1 injection. The Fw 190 A-3 was introduced with improved BMW 801D-2 engines providing more power. The Fw 190 A-4 and Bf 109 G-4 soon followed, with improved radios and homing devices. At their preferred altitudes – below 20,000 feet (6,100 metres) for the Fw 190 and the reverse for the Bf 109 -each of these types was a match for the Spitfire IX. Most of the fighters arriving at JG 2 and JG 26 bases in late 1942 were Bf 109s. The Fw 190 was in short supply, and given the multi-role function of the Fw 190 the Channel Front wings were to scheduled to revert to Bf 109s to permit the Fw 190 to move to priority theatres – a move encouraged by the Fw 190s lack of performance above 7,500 m (24,600 ft) where US bombers operated.

In contrast, the Bf 109 was a superb dogfighter and above 9,000 m (30,000 ft) was in its element. In the spring, 1943, I./JG 2 and II./JG 26 were flying Bf 109s and Fw 190s. Operationally at Gruppe level this was not efficient. It was decided for I. Gruppe convert fully to Fw 190s and II. Gruppe to the Bf 109 G in the spring, 1943; and did so until the end of the war. The Bf 109 and Fw 190 were used to complement each other in the coming battles. The Fw 190s armament, considered effective against all enemies, was used against bombers more frequently, while the high-flying Bf 109s engaged escorting fighters. The Bf 109 G-4 was "up-gunned" as well to the Bf 109 G-6, with two MG 131 machine guns replacing the MG 17, and supplementing the MG 151/20 cannon in the nose. The MW 50 (water-methanol) additive increased lower altitude performance but the increase in weight reduced manoeuvrability. German pilots were critical of the Bf 109s fragility, but praised the Fw 190s strong construction; the latter type remained the preference among western theatre pilots.

=== Sojourn in North Africa ===
Operation Torch in November 1942 began the liberation of Morocco and Algeria from Vichy France, and their removal from the Axis powers. Following on from the Second Battle of El Alamein, the German Africa Corps (DAK) and Italian armies were caught in a vice-like situation; squeezed from east and west. In response, the Wehrmacht enacted Case Anton, to occupy the demilitarised zone of France to forestall an Anglo-American landing. Hitler ordered substantial reinforcements to North Africa, namely Tunisia to prevent an Axis collapse in the theatre. The German success in the Run for Tunis allowed the Axis to retain a foothold in Africa, and the subsequent Battle of Tunisia prolonged the Axis presence for a further six months. II. Gruppe, under the command of Hauptmann Helmut-Felix Bolz, then Oberleutnant Adolf Dickfeld was among Luftwaffe reinforcements rushed down to Southern France, and down the leg of Italy to Africa. II. Gruppe arrived from Santo Pietro, Sicily on 18 November 1942. Dickfeld, a pilot with 100 victories to his credit had under his command were Kurt Bühligen and Erich Rudorffer, and both were successful in Africa.

In the first major action, the Gruppe claimed 10 Desert Air Force fighters on 21 November. The combat was against 81 Squadron, who were attacked by Fw 190s and Bf 109s as they got airborne in the middle of a German air raid. Bühligen made the first JG 2 claim in Africa. Three Spitfires were destroyed and five badly damaged; at least one was destroyed by a bomb burst. Julius Meimberg arrived at the head of 11. Staffel, Pflanz's former command, with Bf 109 Gs. It did not operate autonomously and was attached to II. Gruppe of JG 53. On 1 December 1942 the Gruppe succeeded in downing one Lockheed P-38 Lightning from the US 49th Fighter Squadron without loss near Djedeida and again achieved a single success against No. 72 Squadron RAF the following morning and four more against P-38s on the 3rd. I. and II./JG 53, with 11./JG 2 plus II./JG 2 intercepted a large formation of bombers over Tunis on the 4th. In five minutes 12 were claimed; Meimberg being the most successful of all. The bombers were from 18 and 614 Squadrons. None of the bombers returned to base—only three 18 Squadron and one 614 crew survived. Over Bizerta, the Gruppe claimed four, mainly P-38s; Rudorffer's claim was identified from 72 Squadron. The German airfields were unaffected and II. Gruppe was active throughout the day.

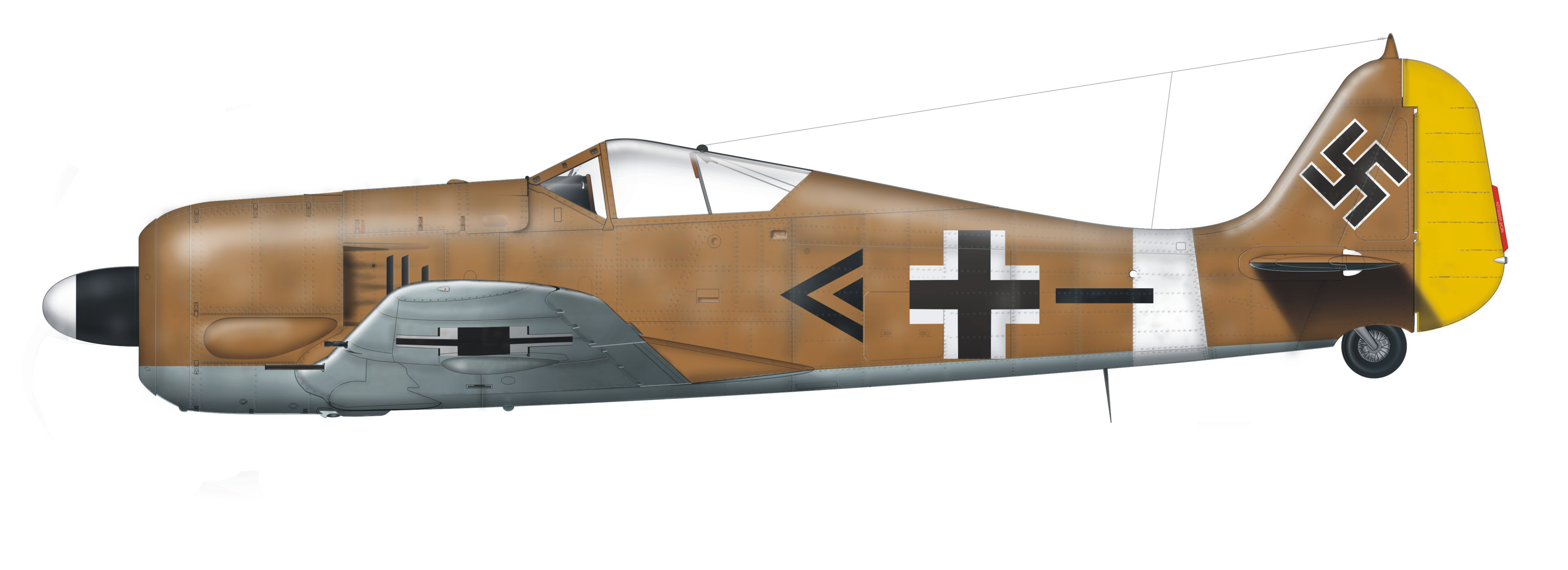
Fw 190 A-4 of II./JG 2, flown by group commander Dickfeld, Tunisia 1943

The British 8th Army and DAF pushed into Italian Libya at the start of 1943, all the way westward to the Libya-Tunisia border. JG 2 was in combat on 20 and 26 December making claims on each day. The Gruppe was based at Kairouan by 9 January 1943. Eight Fw 190s carried out a successful intercept a reconnaissance mission by 241 and 243 Squadron at low-level on 3 February; the German fighters were alerted when they passed by Kairouan. British formations observed them take-off and attack the flight. Four Spitfires were shot down. The Gruppe claimed 12 that day. On the 4th the Fw 190s intercepted US 52d Fighter Group Spitfires and accounted for three for one loss. Two claims were made against the P-38s of the US 82d Fighter Group. Five days later, six Fw 190s led by Rudorfer claimed an enormous 16 aircraft destroyed in a single action. American records are lacking, but the war diary of the Armée de l’Air, Groupe de Chasse II/5 gives some leads. Nine P-40s of this group, escorted by P-39 Airacobras of the US 81st Fighter Group engaged Fw 190s near Djebel Bou Dabouss. The 94th Squadron, 1st Fighter Group P-38s may have also been involved in the engagement for they were escorting the 301st Bombardment Group to bomb Kairouan airfields. The only known P-39 loss was recorded as belonging to the 350th Fighter Group. The Gruppe made many claims again on 15 February, but once more American records are lacking in detail. Of the 11 claims, Rudorfer submitted seven. Four P-38s and three Spitfires were claimed by him; the latter opponents may have been from the US 31st or 52nd Fighter Groups.

The Battle of Kasserine Pass was the only major victory for the Axis in Africa during 1943. Operation Ochsenkopf ended in defeat and the US-Commonwealth armies pushed the Panzer Army Africa into the northern tips on Tunisia. II. Gruppe was spared the final defeat of the Axis in Africa for it was ordered back to the continent in mid-March 1943. 11./JG 2 was formally incorporated into JG 53 and remained in Africa. JG 2 claimed approximately 150 enemy aircraft in North Africa for nine pilots killed.

=== Channel Front and Defence of the Reich ===
JG 2s first contacts with the USAAF were fought over the U-boat pens on the French Atlantic coast. 8. Staffel was moved to protect the submarines in their transit routes through the Bay of Biscay from RAF Coastal Command. In October 1942, the US Eighth Air Force began targeting the U-boat pens. Lorient was targeted on 21 October and the B-17s of the 97th Bombardment Group lost three of their number on this mission while one Fw 190 pilot was killed. A single B-17 fell on 9 November over Saint-Nazaire. On 19 November another fell over La Pallice but cost 8. Staffel two Fw 190s. Hahn was replaced by Egon Mayer, at III. Gruppe and assumed responsibility for the Atlantic coast. Mayer was purportedly more analytical than his predecessor. After examining combat reports against US bombers, he was sure the best way to bring one down was in a head-on attack, where the defensive guns were weakest. On 23 November this tactic was tested with success. The Fw 190s attacked in threes and hereto achieved the greatest success in a single pass; four bombers went down. The attack was imperfectly completed; several Fw 190s pulled up behind the bomber stream instead of diving away and were damaged by the tail gunners—one pilot from 7./JG 2 was shot down. On 30 December over Lorient, the US Eighth Air Force lost another three bombers in exchange for one Fw 190.

JG 2 operated a "two-level" war in 1943. The first consisted of protecting German military targets in France and the Low Countries from Allied air power, the second the "Defence of the Reich", the air defence of the Greater German Reich. During the year, at least 69 of Fighter Command's losses, plus seven damaged, can be attributed to JG 2.

The fighting proved costly. During the year, approximately 200 pilots were killed or missing; compared with just 36 in 1940. In addition 100 were wounded. While the majority were inexperience pilots, a growing number were formation leaders including nine Staffelkapitain. Of the experienced pilots, Bruno Stolle was the only member to receive the Knight's Cross in 1943. Over the Channel theatre, experience proved no guarantor of survival; a number of experten arriving from the Eastern Front found to their cost. Georg-Peter Eder was twice shot down while with JG 2 and wounded 14 times from 1941 to 1945. Horst Hanning, another Eastern Front ace, was killed on 15 May 1943 and posthumously awarded the Oak Leaves to the Knight's Cross. In June, Oesau was replaced by Major Egon Mayer, days after the Eighth Air Force destroyed the JG 2 headquarters at Beaumont-le-Roger, killing one pilot, 19 other personnel and wounding 16 more on 28th. At this time Mayer was to become the Luftwaffe's leading exponent against heavy bombers. Nevertheless, II. Gruppe, for example, experienced an Eighth raid on their base at Vitry-en-Artois by 80 B-17s which cost them three pilots against the US fighter escort while another five personnel were killed and eight wounded in the raid. Twenty-four hours later, JG 2 suffered its worst loss of the year, when Le Bourget and Poix-de-Picardie airfields came under attack. Nine pilots were killed and six wounded; two were wounded while landing under the bombs.

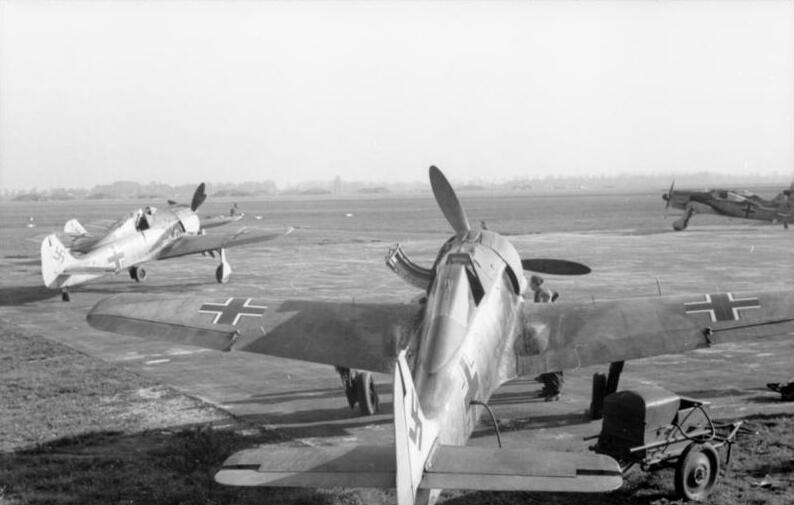
Fw 190 As of either JG 2 or JG 26 in France, 1942/43.

I. and II. Gruppe of JG 2 were also sent to form the interception force against the Schweinfurt–Regensburg mission in August, reached the battle area and disappeared without apparent repercussions. III./JG 1 reached the bombers and then broke up to look for stragglers. Josef Priller, commanding JG 26, and NJG 1, made a formal complaint against them for not mounting a single concerted attack and denounced them as Leichenfledderei (corpse-looters). II. Gruppe contributed a single claim against a Spitfire en route to base. One Gruppe reached the bombers at some point, and claimed four. Three Staffelkapitäne were killed in action with US aircraft in August, and a fourth by RAF Spitfires. On 6 September JG 2 achieved an increasingly rare success; the US Eighth Air Force attacked Stuttgart, losing 45 bombers—Mayer claimed three of them in 19 minutes over France. On 23 September, the wing suffered 12 casualties on a single day in action with the Eighth. During the month, JG 2 and JG 26, still operating as the Channel Front wings, were the only fighter units expanded to 12 Staffeln despite Galland's efforts to expand the RLV force. The move inserted Bf 109 units into Fw 190 Gruppen once more. 4. Staffel became 7. Staffel, for example, moving from I. to II. Gruppe; this unit, as 4. Staffel, was equipped with Bf 109 G-6s in the autumn 1943 but was anti-bomber given the addition of the two 20mm cannon gondola under each wing. JG 2 was involved in the Second Raid on Schweinfurt in October, and downed nine B-17s as the bomber stream returned down the Somme. The German pilots should have made more of the opportunity against unescorted bombers, but the American crews escaped into the towering cumulus formations.

The August–October 1943 actions were the last successes of the German fighter arm in World War II. The Eighth Air Force temporarily suspended deep-penetration operations until long-range US fighters were available. The Americans contended themselves by striking at German coastal targets. In late 1943, the P-38 US 55th Fighter Group became operational, along with the drop tank-fitted Republic P-47 Thunderbolt. In February 1944, "Big Week", part of Operation Argument began. The American-led operation was a series of attacks against German fighter production. The American operations were successful, if overstated in the damage done to German production, but air superiority in daylight had passed irrevocably to the Allies. This month had seen the introduction into the air war of the North American P-51 Mustang. The fighter eventually had the range and performance to escort US bombers to the target and back which supplemented the drop-tank fitted P-47s and P-38s. American tactics soon changed from protecting the US bombers to patrolling fixed boxes of airspace. American fighter pilots were free to hunt German fighters; bombers that missed their rendezvous were left to fend for themselves. This marked a more aggressive use of VIII Fighter Command. The RAF 2nd Tactical Air Force was also released from escort duty—the Spitfires were now authorised to seek out the Luftwaffe over France while the bombers softened up the invasion coast in preparation for Operation Overlord. In February 1944 JG 2 suffered 26 killed and missing plus 15 wounded.

JG 2 began receiving he improved Fw 190 A-8 in 1944 which had increased engine power. The penultimate series of the A series was the A-8. Some of the later production models had the GM-1 and MW 50 additives to boost engine power at high altitudes, though neither system was widely used. The BMW 802D-2 was fitted to some of them, which future heavier armour around the annular cowling and oil cooler. A future of the design, and all subsequent models, was the addition of a bulge in the wings to accommodate the MK 108 cannon whether the particular aircraft had this armament fitted or not. The conversion was only partial, for II. Gruppe retained Bf 109 Gs through the summer.

The majority of German fighter units, with the exception of JG 2 and JG 26, were pulled back into Germany under the command of Luftflotte Reich to reduce their vulnerability and better concentrate them over targets in Germany. Brunswick, Frankfurt, Wilhelmshaven and the Ruhr were the favoured targets for the Eighth after Big Week. The kanalgeschwader, forming the II. Jagdkorps, shouldered the Luftwaffe's defensive effort on 2 March. Geschwaderkommodore Egon Mayer was among the 11 pilots killed and missing from both wings. Mayer, one of the few to achieve 100 victory claims against the Western Allies, had also downed 25 heavy bombers, more than any other pilot at the time of his death. The originator of the head-on attack probably fell to a P-47 Thunderbolt from the 365th Fighter Group. The unit claimed six Fw 190s destroyed and two probably destroyed—they were the newest ground-attack outfit in the US Ninth Air Force. Major Kurt Ubben replaced Mayer. The following day the Eighth Air Force attacked Berlin. JG 2 formed part of the interception, but though it and JG 26 were well within range of the bomber stream they were not ordered to attack. They may have been used to block an unexpected American change of course. On the last day in April, the exhausted Geschwader suffered the loss of 13 casualties in a single action.

=== Normandy and the Western Front ===
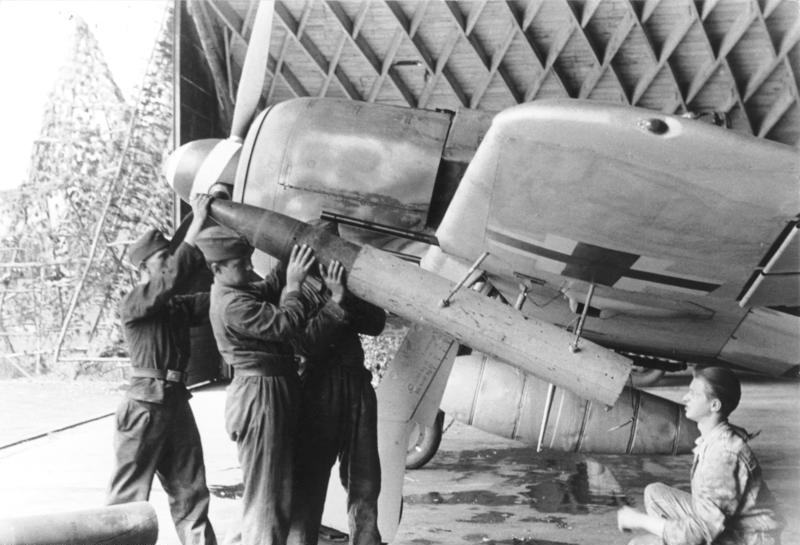
Fw 190 A-8 with the under-wing WGr 21 rocket-propelled mortar. The weapon was developed from the 21 cm Nebelwerfer 42 infantry weapon.

In May 1944, the OKL confronted a further major challenge; how to bolster Luftflotte Reich while building up strength for the Allied invasion of France, expected that summer. Luftflotte 3 was responsible for stocking airfields, and preparing for the stream of reinforcements from Luftflotte Reich once the invasion started. JG 2 and JG 26 were expected to form the mainstay of the German fighter defence in the initial phase. Both Geschwader were sent to southern France in rotation, one Gruppe at a time, to rest and rebuild for the battle. By the time the Normandy landings, D-Day, took place on 6 June 1944, a fourth Geschwaderkommodore was dead. Kurt Ubben had commanded JG 2 for just under two months before he was killed in combat with US fighters on 27 April 1944. He was the final wing commander of JG 2 to die in battle, by far the highest fatality of the position in any German fighter wing.

In the days before the invasion. III. Gruppe, under the command of Herbert Huppertz, vacated Cormeilles for Fontenay le Comte north of La Rochelle. II. Gruppe departed Creil on 28 May for Germany, to replace its worn out Bf 109 Gs with newer sub variants of the G-6. I. Gruppe was sent to Nancy, 200 miles (320 km) to the east. On the morning of the Allied invasion, JG 2 were quick to respond. The new commanding officer Oberstleutnant Kurt Bühligen led JG 2 in fighter patrols over the invasion area. JG 2 fought in aerial combat, but was also involved in anti-shipping operations off Gold Beach with WGr 21 rocket-propelled mortars. III. Gruppe flew a low-level interception against the airborne landings near Caen. The surprised 12 P-51s strafing road convoys and claimed eight without loss, a feat at this stage of the war was an exception. I. and III. Gruppe claimed no fewer than 18 Allied fighters on D-Day for three losses in total. The Geschwaderkommodore claimed his 99th victory and reached 100 soon after. The next day, JG 2 claimed 10 Allied fighters. The first 48 hours were successful, but proved short-lived. In the last three weeks of June, JG 2 suffered 70 casualties. Eight were Staffelkapitäne and three Gruppenkommandeure. Among those killed was III./JG 2s commanding officer Herbert Huppertz. His replacement, Hauptmann Josef Wurmheller, a 100+ victory ace, died in action 14 days later. II./JG 2 arrived to Creil from Cologne on 14 June. At the turn of July 1944 the casualties among the inexperienced pilots were high; on average 12 were lost per day. Within 12 days, II. Gruppe had only 17 Bf 109s operational from the 50+ it brought from Germany. The other two Fw 190 Gruppen had fought nearly to extinction over Normandy—five and eight Fw 190s were left in first and second Gruppe. III. Gruppe left France for Husum on 11 July to refit and rebuild. II. and III./JG 2 carried on the fight and claimed some 16 victories over July but lost three times that number. Among the dead was Ruthard von Richthofen, 10. Staffel, a distant relation of JG 2s namesake Manfred von Richthofen. The OKL issued an order to restrict flying and conserve fuel stocks in Normandy. Only unrestricted operations were permitted against US heavy bombers. By this stage, Luftflotte 3 had barely 75 fighters operational. I. Gruppe arrived from rebuilding in Germany on 13 August, and was committed to battle. losing six pilots and claiming four US fighters over Châtres-la-Forêt. In the final two weeks of the campaign, this group suffered another 20 casualties. Twelve days later, as Paris fell, the seven surviving pilots of III. Gruppe retreated to Germany to rebuild, and the rest of JG 2 began to pull out of France.

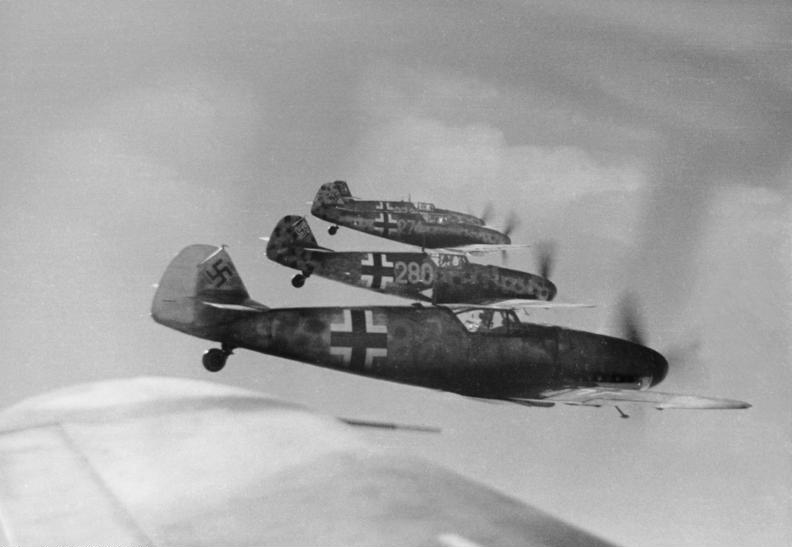
Bf 109 G-6, July 1944. The type equipped II. Gruppe at this time. The G-6 nearest the camera carries an Erla Haube canopy

In September JG 2 relocated to airfields around Frankfurt. I. Gruppe moved to Merzhausen, II. Gruppe to Nidda after reinforcements. JG 2 was not afforded any rest and on 9 September the unit lost eight Fw 190s in action with P-47s and another eight three days later in combat with P-51s. At this point the Western Front and Defence of the Reich merged into one, and though formally JG 2 remained part of Luftflotte 3 and its new incarnation Luftwaffenkommando West, Luftflotte Reich made demands of the wing for home defence duties. III. Gruppe moved to Altenstadt after re-equipping with Bf 109s and through to the end of November 1944, JG 2 was able to increase the number of combat ready fighters from 78 to 91. Ground crews had more time to work on aircraft as the fuel shortage curtailed flying, and a second reason for this lack of action was General Galland's plans for a "big blow"—an all-out attack on the next Eighth Air Force raid he hoped would inflict so many casualties on US bombers they would suspend their aerial offensive. II. Gruppe began partial conversion to the Bf 109 K in October to supplement the late model Gs in operation and III. Gruppe began to convert to the Fw 190 D-9; a vastly improved high-altitude capable variant of the Fw 190. Bomb-racks also arrived at JG 2, which signalled the abandonment of Galland's plan, in favour of a ground offensive in the West. Ultra intercepts picked up messages to JG 2 concerning the equipping of fighters with bombs which aroused some suspicion. JG 2 continued to fight and incur losses. It was involved in the disastrous 21 November operation in which the Luftwaffe lost at least 61 fighters in exchange for 15 US fighters and 25 bombers.

JG 2 was placed on the order of battle for Hitler's Ardennes offensive, his last major attack in the West. The remained at Merzhausen, Nidda and Altenstadt. The offensive began on 16 December 1944 and I. Gruppe was in action on 17 December over the frontline. With elements of JG 26, they ran into the 428th Fighter Squadron of the 474th Fighter Group. JG 26 exacted a toll of the strafing US fighters for no loss but JG 2 lost four Fw 190s. JG 2 reported that eight pilots failed to return this day; four from I. Gruppe. II. and III. Gruppe were ordered to cover the Sixth Panzer Army by destroying American artillery west of Monschau. Approximately 24 Bf 109 G-14s from II. Gruppe flew escort for 10 Fw 190 Ds of III. Gruppe which carried the 21 cm rockets. The formation ran into 15 P-47s near Krinkelt, Belgium. Five German fighters were shot down, killing one pilot. JG 2 were unable to claim a single victory. Kurt Bühligen led 20 Bf 109s into combat against the 395th Fighter Squadron, 368th Fighter Group as the Battle of St. Vith raged; the result is not stated. The following day, II. Jagdkorps lost 34 fighters and claimed only four Allied aircraft over the front. II. and III. Gruppe were known to have been involved, losing two Bf 109 K-4s and their pilots. On 23 December, JG 2 was part of the air defence against US bomber formations which were now uninhibited by the weather. The 391st Bombardment Group attacked the road viaduct at Ahrweiler. The conditions forced the bombers to continue without fighter escort, and to make two bomb runs. Ground-fire was heavy, but suddenly stopped when a red flare was fired. They had lingered too long over the target, and were attacked by 60 Bf 109s from JG 2, JG 3 and JG 11. In 23 minutes, 16 of the 30 Martin B-26 Marauders were shot down. US gunners claimed seven fighters. The US bombers struck at German airfields the following day and JG 2 lost four pilots to P-51s defending them. On 27 December II./JG 2 and III./JG 3 provided escort for I./JG 1, who were ordered to conduct a low-level fighter-bomber patrol over the Siege of Bastogne. III./JG 3 turned back, and I./JG 1 were wiped out by P-47s; just two of the 17 pilots returned to JG 1. JG 2 were fortunate to escape with two losses in combat with 20 P-51s.

Several days before Christmas, the senior officers of JG 2 met near their bases in the Taunus. The Geschwaderkommodore briefed his group commanders that they were to attack the airfield at Sint-Truiden, home to the 48th Fighter Group and 404th Fighter Group. Hauptmann Franz Hrdlicka, and the other group commanders, rushed the briefing though Major Walter Matoni's II. Gruppe were at least given maps, and had the airfield mapped out on a sand table. On 1 January 1945, JG 2 participated in Operation Bodenplatte. I./JG 2s ground crews made ready 35 of 46 Fw 190s, 29 of which were Fw 190 Ds. Only 33 pilots were fit for operations, so the Gruppe reported only 33 Fw 190s ready. II./JG 2 could field 20 of 29 Bf 109s. Stab/JG 2 had three Fw 190s ready for the mission. It is not clear whether Bühligen took part in the mission. III./JG 2 reported 40 Fw 190s operational, 34 of them Fw 190 Ds. However, only 28 of the 43 pilots in the unit were fit for operations and the formation fielded only 28 fighters. In total, 84 aircraft were ready on 31 December, including 28 Fw 190 D-9s. At 09:12, JG 2 crossed the front line at Malmedy and was greeted by an enormous volume of Allied ground fire. The entire area was heavily defended by anti-aircraft artillery, since the area had been the scene of heavy fighting, but also had been attacked by V-1 and V-2 missiles. I./JG 2 lost at least seven fighters to ground fire alone. III./JG 2 lost 10 fighters. A possible seven Bf 109s from II./JG 2 were also lost to ground fire. JG 2 attacked Asch and Ophoven airfields by mistake.

JG 2's mission was a disaster. I./JG 2 lost 18 Fw 190s and six more were damaged by ground fire and enemy aircraft. This represented 73% of their force. Of the 15 pilots missing, six would survive as POWs. II./JG 2 lost five Bf 109s and three were damaged a loss rate of 40%. Pilot losses were three missing, one dead and one wounded. III./JG 2 lost 19 Fw 190s and three were damaged, a loss rate of 79%. Nine pilots were killed, two were wounded and four were captured. JG 2 total losses, according to another source, amounted to 40% of the force. Pilot losses were 24 killed or posted missing, 10 captured and four wounded. Another source asserts that pilot losses stood at 23 killed or missing. On 10 January 1945, JG 2 could report only 25 fighters combat ready; I. Gruppe 3 (from 5), II. Gruppe 4 (8) and III. Gruppe 9 (12). The sum total of US losses were 10 destroyed, 31 damaged. JG 2s casualties prevented the wing from engaging in combat for the following two weeks. Among the losses was Hauptmann Georg Schröder, commanding II. Gruppe, who was shot down and captured by British forces. Matoni replaced him after the operation.

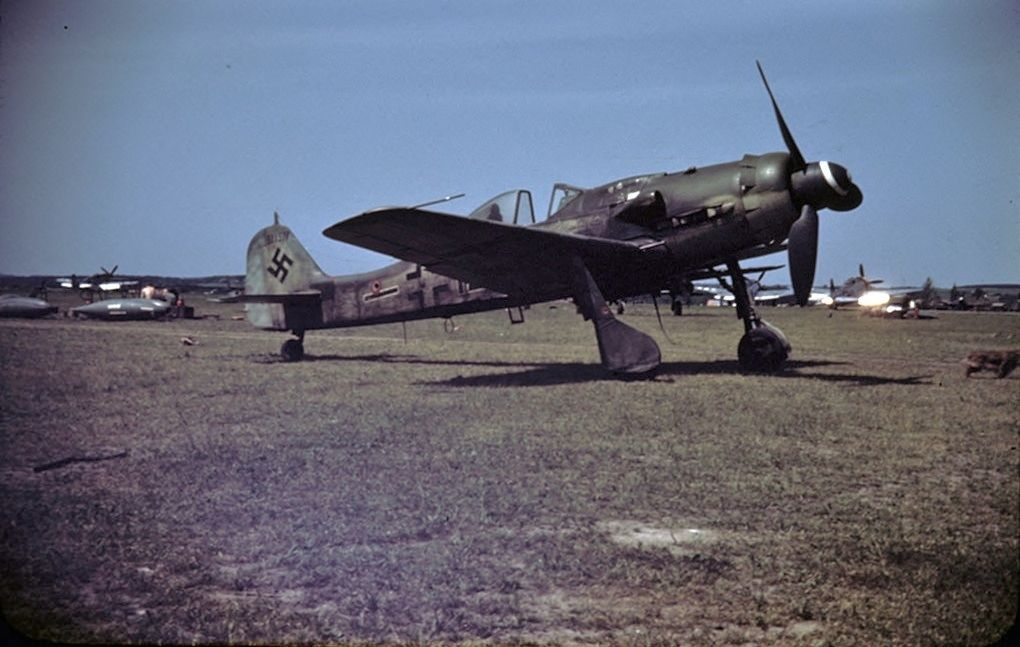
Fw 190 D-9. JG 2 operated the type in 1944/45

On 14 January 1945, it flew one final time against the Eighth Air Force and lost four of the 139 fighters destroyed in the Luftwaffe's last major challenge to the American air fleet. The 'contribution' of JG 2 to the losses that day were a reflection of the condition of the unit, which had been gutted in battles over December 1944/January 1945. JG 2 fought through February and March 1945 during the Western Allied invasion of Germany. Hauptmann Franz Hrdlicka, who had survived being shot down near Arnhem by Spitfires the previous September, was killed on 25 March 1945 in action with US fighters only two days after receiving the Oak Leaves to the Knight's Cross. JG 2s Fw 190s were now fitted with bomb racks to attack Ludendorf Bridge at Remagen, seized as a bridgehead by the Americans during the Battle of Remagen. JG 2 had only 16 Fw 190 D-9s left by April, as the wing was formally assigned to Luftflotte Reich. JG 2 moved to Bohemia, but III. Gruppe disappeared from German order of battle returns after 25 April 1945; it is said that Siegfried Lemke led his surviving men north, though no record exists of the Gruppe movements. The other Gruppen moved to Luftwaffenkommando 8, assigned to IX. Fliegerkorps (J). All that remained of the command was III. Gruppe JG 7, equipped with Messerschmitt Me 262 jets based at Prague. The Stab and I. Gruppe disbanded in the first week of May, 1945. II. Gruppe moved to Prague and then back into Bavaria to surrender to General Patton's US Third Army.

== Commanding officers ==
Originally JG 2 was formed as JG 132 on 1 April 1936.

• Major Johann Raithel	1 April 1936	–	8 June 1936
• Oberst Gerd von Massow	9 June 1936	–	31 March 1940
On 1 November 1938, JG 132 became JG 131 which was renamed again on 1 May 1939 to JG 2.
• Oberst Harry von Bülow-Bothkamp	1 April 1940	–	2 September 1940
• Major Wolfgang Schellmann	3 September 1940	–	19 October 1940
• Major Helmut Wick	20 October 1940	–	28 November 1940 †
• Hauptmann Karl-Heinz Greisert (acting)	29 November 1940	–	15 February 1941
• Major Wilhelm Balthasar	16 February 1941	–	3 July 1941 †
• Oberstleutnant Walter Oesau	July 1941	–	June 1943
• Major Egon Mayer	1 July 1943	–	2 March 1944 †
• Major Kurt Ubben	March 1944	–	27 April 1944 †
• Oberstleutnant Kurt Bühligen	May 1944	–	May 1945

=== Gruppenkommandeure ===
==== I. Gruppe of JG 2 ====
I .Gruppe was the oldest unit of JG 2, dating back to 1 May 1934 when it was formed as I. Gruppe of JG 132, also known under its cover name Reklamestaffel Mitteldeutschland (Advertisement Squadron Middle Germany), and placed under the command of Major Robert Ritter von Greim.

• Major Robert Ritter von Greim	1 May 1934	–	1 April 1935
• Major Kurt-Bertram von Döring	1 April 1935	–	1 April 1936
• Oberstleutnant Carl Vieck	1 April 1936	–	17 October 1939
On 1 November 1938, I. Gruppe of JG 132 became I. Gruppe of JG 131 which was renamed again on 1 May 1939 to I. Gruppe of JG 2.
• Hauptmann Jürgen Roth	17 October 1939	–	22 June 1940
• Hauptmann Henning Strümpell	22 June 1940	–	9 September 1940
• Hauptmann Helmut Wick	9 September 1940	–	20 October 1940
• Hauptmann Karl-Heinz Krahl	20 October 1940	–	20 November 1941
• Hauptmann Ignaz Prestele	20 November 1941	–	4 May 1942
• Hauptmann Erich Leie	4 May 1942	–	January 1943
• Hauptmann Helmut Bolz	January 1943	–	May 1943
• Hauptmann Erich Hohagen	May 1943	–	28 September 1944
• Major Walter Matoni	September 1944	–	December 1944
• Hauptmann Franz Karch (acting)	December 1944	–	February 1945
• Hauptmann Franz Hrdlicka	February 1945	–	25 March 1945 †
• Oberleutnant Heinz Eichhoff	26 March 1945	–	May 1945

==== II. Gruppe of JG 2 ====
• Hauptmann Wolfgang Schellmann	November 1939	–	2 September 1940
• Hauptmann Karl-Heinz Greisert	2 September 1940	–	1 May 1942
• Hauptmann Helmut-Felix Bolz	1 May 1942	–	December 1942
• Oberleutnant Adolf Dickfeld	December 1942	–	January 1943
• Oberleutnant Erich Rudorffer (acting)	January 1943	–	May 1943
• Hauptmann Erich Rudorffer	May 1943	–	August 1943
• Hauptmann Kurt Bühligen	August 1943	–	May 1944
• Hauptmann Georg Schröder	May 1944	–	1 January 1945 (POW)
• Major Walter Matoni	1 January 1945	–	February 1945
• Hauptmann Fritz Karch	February 1945	–	May 1945

==== III. Gruppe of JG 2 ====
• Hauptmann Dr. Erich Mix	March 1940	–	23 September 1940
• Hauptmann Otto Bertram	23 September 1940	–	28 October 1940
• Hauptmann Hans "Assi" Hahn	29 October 1940	–	November 1942
• Hauptmann Egon Mayer	November 1942	–	30 June 1943
• Hauptmann Bruno Stolle	1 July 1943	–	March 1944
• Hauptmann Herbert Huppertz	March 1944	–	8 June 1944 †
• Hauptmann Josef Wurmheller	8 June 1944	–	22 June 1944 †
• Hauptmann Siegfried Lemke	July 1944	–	May 1945

==== IV.(N) Gruppe of JG 2 ====
- Hauptmann Blumensaat, February 1940
