= Bruno Stolle =

German flying ace (1915–2004)

- Born: 13 April 1915; Münster
- Died: 22 January 2004 (aged 88); Rheinbach
- Military career
- Allegiance: Nazi Germany; West Germany
- Branch: Luftwaffe; German Air Force
- Service years: 1935–1945; 1956–1972
- Rank: Hauptmann (Wehrmacht); Oberstleutnant (Bundeswehr)
- Units: LG 1, JG 51, JG 2, JG 11, EKdo Ta 152
- Commands: III./JG 2, I./JG 11
- Conflicts: World War II: Battle of France; Battle of Britain; Defence of the Reich
- Awards: Knight's Cross of the Iron Cross

Bruno Stolle (13 April 1915 – 22 January 2004) was a German Luftwaffe fighter ace and recipient of the Knight's Cross of the Iron Cross. The Knight's Cross of the Iron Cross, and its variants were the highest awards in the military and paramilitary forces of Nazi Germany during World War II. Stolle was credited with 35 aerial victories in 271 combat missions. Following World War II, he served in the German Air Force.

== Early life and career ==
Stolle was born on 13 April 1915 in Münster, a province of the Kingdom of Prussia within the German Empire. Following graduation from school, he volunteered for service in the Luftwaffe in 1935. After completion of flight training, (Note: Flight training in the Luftwaffe progressed through the levels A1, A2 and B1, B2, referred to as A/B flight training. A training included theoretical and practical training in aerobatics, navigation, long-distance flights and dead-stick landings. The B courses included high-altitude flights, instrument flights, night landings and training to handle the aircraft in difficult situations.) Stolle was posted to Lehrgeschwader 1 (LG 1—1st Demonstration Wing) in November 1936. On 1 November 1938, LG 1 was restructured. The I. (leichte Jagd) Gruppe, the light fighter group, was detached from LG 1 while II. (schwere Jagd) Gruppe, the heavy fighter group, became the new I. (schwere Jagd) Gruppe of LG 1 and was based at Barth. Until the outbreak of World War II, Stolle served with I. (schwere Jagd) Gruppe as a blind flying instructor.

== World War II ==
World War II in Europe had begun on Friday 1 September 1939 when German forces invaded Poland. Stolle was then posted to 3. Staffel (3rd squadron) of Jagdgeschwader 51 (JG 51—51st Fighter Wing) and on 15 March 1940 to 8. Staffel of Jagdgeschwader 2 "Richthofen" (JG 2—2nd Fighter Wing). III. Gruppe of JG 2 to which his Staffel was subordinated had just been formed from elements of JG 51 in Magdeburg and placed under the command of Major Erich Mix. The Gruppe was equipped with the Messerschmitt Bf 109 E-1 and E-3. On 10 April, in preparation for the Battle of France, the Gruppe moved to Frankfurt-Rebstock Airfield.

=== Squadron leader ===
Following the Battle of France, III. Gruppe of JG 2 returned to Frankfurt-Rebstock Airfield for a period of rest and maintenance. The Gruppe returned to France in late July 1940, arriving at an airfield at Octeville-sur-Mer near Le Havre on 4 August to fight against the Royal Air Force (RAF). Here on 11 August during the Battle of Britain, Stolle claimed his first aerial victories, two Supermarine Spitfire fighters near the Isle of Portland. On 7 September, Stolle was appointed Staffelkapitän (squadron leader) of 8. Staffel of JG 2. He succeeded Oberleutnant Karl-Heinz Metz who made an emergency landing near Detling the day before and was taken prisoner of war.

Stolle claimed a Handley Page Hampden bomber during Operation Donnerkeil on 12 February 1942. The objective of this operation was to give the German battleships Scharnhorst and Gneisenau and the heavy cruiser Prinz Eugen fighter protection in the breakout from Brest to Germany. The Channel Dash operation (11–13 February 1942) by the Kriegsmarine was codenamed Operation Cerberus by the Germans. In support of this, the Luftwaffe, formulated an air superiority plan dubbed Operation Donnerkeil for the protection of the three German capital ships. Stolle was promoted to Hauptmann (captain) on 1 April 1942. In May, III. Gruppe of JG 2 converted from the Bf 109 F to the radial engine powered Focke-Wulf Fw 190 A. In August Upon request by Fliegerführer Atlantik (Flyer Command Atlantic), Stolle's 8. Staffel escorted Arado Ar 196 observation seaplanes patrolling over the Bay of Biscay in search for Allied shipping. The slow flying Ar 196 planes had become easy targets for long range RAF Bristol Beaufighters. Flying these missions, Stolle claimed five Beaufighters shot down, one each on 8 September, 26 November and 1 December, and two on 18 December. On 21 October, Stolle claimed his first United States Army Air Forces (USAAF) heavy bomber, a Boeing B-17 Flying Fortress bomber attacking Lorient, his 23rd aerial victory in total. This earned him the German Cross in Gold (Deutsches Kreuz in Gold) on 29 October.

On 29 December, Stolle led a Rotte, a flight of two aircraft, on a fighter bomber mission against Eastbourne. The attack destroyed two houses, extensively damaging three other houses and killed two civilians and wounded further 33 people. On his return, Stolle intercepted two Spitfires from No. 91 Squadron and shot down Pilot Officer Irvin Downer who was killed in action. On 17 March 1943, Stolle was awarded the Knight's Cross of the Iron Cross (Ritterkreuz des Eisernen Kreuzes). He was the only member of JG 2 who received this distinction in 1943.

=== Group commander, instructor and testing the Ta 152 ===
On 25 June 1943, Stolle was appointed Gruppenkommandeur (group commander) of III. Gruppe of JG 2. He succeeded Hauptmann Egon Mayer in this capacity who was given command of JG 2 as Geschwaderkommodore (wing commander). In consequence, command of 8. Staffel was passed on to Hauptmann Herbert Huppertz. On 30 December, Stolle claimed his 35th and last aerial victory. That day, the USAAF VIII Bomber Command had attacked Ludwigshafen. Leading the attack of III. Gruppe against the returning bombers, Stolle claimed a B-17 bomber shot down. In February 1944, Stolle was transferred to the Schießschule der Luftwaffe at Værløse Airfield, an aerial gunnery school for fighter pilots, as an instructor. As a result, Huppertz was given command of III. Gruppe.

In October 1944, Stolle was transferred to Jagdgeschwader 11 (JG 11—11th Fighter Wing) where he replaced Hauptmann Walter Matoni as commander of I. Gruppe. On 25 November, Stolle was transferred again to take command of the Erprobungskommando Ta 152 (EKdo Ta 152—Testing Command Ta 152), testing the Focke-Wulf Ta 152 fighter under operational conditions at Rechlin, the Luftwaffe's main testing ground for new aircraft designs. Command of I. Gruppe of JG 11 was handed to Hauptmann Rudiger Kirchmayr. On 23 January 1945, ordered EKdo Ta 152 to be redesignated and became the Stabsstaffel (headquarters squadron) of Jagdgeschwader 301 (JG 301—301st Fighter Wing). The Stabsstaffel however was not operationally subordinated to JG 301 and remained independent.

== Later life and career ==
Following World War II, Stolle initially worked for the Belgian airline Sabena as a member of the ground personnel. In 1956, he joined the newly created German Air Force, at the time referred to as the Bundesluftwaffe. Stolle served with the Flugzeugführerschule "B" (FFS B—Pilot Training School "B") at Fürstenfeldbruck Air Base, the Military Counterintelligence Service, as a liaison officer in Lisbon, and lastly with the Federal Ministry of Defence in Bonn. He retired on 31 March 1972 holding the rank of Oberstleutnant (lieutenant colonel). Stolle died on 22 January 2004 at the age of 88 in Rheinbach, Germany.

== Summary of career ==
=== Aerial victory claims ===
According to Schumann, Stolle was credited with 35 aerial victories claimed in 271 combat missions. Obermaier also list him with 35 aerial victories, including five heavy bombers, claimed in 271 combat missions. Mathews and Foreman, authors of Luftwaffe Aces — Biographies and Victory Claims, researched the German Federal Archives and found records for 28 aerial victory claims, plus six further unconfirmed claims. All of his victories were claimed on the Western Front and include three four-engined heavy bombers.

Victory claims were logged to a map-reference (PQ = Planquadrat), for example "PQ 14 West 8954". The Luftwaffe grid map (Jägermeldenetz) covered all of Europe, western Russia and North Africa and was composed of rectangles measuring 15 minutes of latitude by 30 minutes of longitude, an area of about 360 square miles (930 km^{2}). These sectors were then subdivided into 36 smaller units to give a location area 3 km × 4 km (1.9 mi × 2.5 mi) in size.

Chronicle of aerial victories
This along with the * (asterisk) indicates an Herausschuss (separation shot)—a severely damaged heavy bomber forced to separate from his combat box which was counted as an aerial victory. This and the ? (question mark) indicates information discrepancies listed by Prien, Stemmer, Rodeike, Bock, Mathews and Foreman.
Claim	Date	Time	Type	Location	Claim	Date	Time	Type	Location
– 8. Staffel of Jagdgeschwader 2 "Richthofen" – At the Channel and over England — 26 June 1940 – 21 June 1941
1	11 August 1940	11:45	Spitfire	Portland	3	26 September 1940	17:42	Spitfire	25 km (16 mi) southwest of the Isle of Wight
2	11 August 1940	11:49	Spitfire	Portland					
– 8. Staffel of Jagdgeschwader 2 "Richthofen" – On the Western Front — 22 June 1941 – 31 December 1941
4	2 July 1941	12:35	Spitfire	west of Armentières	10	16 August 1941	13:47	Spitfire	east of Boulogne-sur-Mer
5? (Note: According to Mathews and Foreman this claim is unconfirmed.)	5 July 1941	13:30	Blenheim		11	17 September 1941	16:03	Spitfire	
6	23 July 1941	20:37? (Note: According to Mathews and Foreman claimed at 20:35.)	Spitfire	vicinity of Marzingarbe	12	21 October 1941	13:02	Spitfire	
7	14 August 1941	18:30	Spitfire	Gravelines; Bury St Edmunds-Gravelines	13	24 November 1941	16:49	Spitfire	
8	14 August 1941	18:33	Spitfire	Gravelines	14	5 December 1941	16:37? (Note: According to Mathews and Foreman claimed at 13:37.)	Spitfire	
9	16 August 1941	13:45	Spitfire	east of Boulogne-sur-Mer	15	5 December 1941	16:45? (Note: According to Mathews and Foreman claimed at 13:45.)	Spitfire	
– 8. Staffel of Jagdgeschwader 2 "Richthofen" – On the Western Front — 1 January – 31 December 1942
16?	12 February 1942	15:50	Hampden	off Holland	24	7 November 1942	17:12? (Note: According to Mathews and Foreman claimed at 17:02.)	B-24	10 km (6.2 mi) north of Landerneau
17?	10 June 1942	14:14	Spitfire		25	26 November 1942	14:45	Beaufighter	135 km (84 mi) west of Brest
18?	25 June 1942	18:10	Spitfire	off Ushant	26	1 December 1942	09:48	Beaufighter	PQ 14 West 8954
19? (Note: This claim s not listed by Mathews and Foreman.)	18 August 1942	11:08	Wellington		27	18 December 1942	15:36	Beaufighter	PQ 14 West 8951
20?	8 September 1942	09:12	Beaufighter		28	18 December 1942	15:39	Beaufighter	PQ 14 West 8963
21	21 September 1942	20:05	Whitley	northwest of Quimper	29	20 December 1942	10:32	Boston	PQ 14 West 8962
22	26 September 1942? (Note: According to Mathews and Foreman claimed on 27 September 1942.)	18:46	Spitfire	north of Landerneau	30	20 December 1942	10:36	Boston	PQ 14 West 8959
23	21 October 1942	14:00	B-17	PQ 14 West 6826	31	29 December 1942? (Note: According to Mathews and Foreman claimed on 29 January 1943.)	14:35	Spitfire	PQ 14 West 6953; PQ 14 West 4075
– 8. Staffel of Jagdgeschwader 2 "Richthofen" – On the Western Front — 1 January – 25 June 1943
32	26 February 1943	17:25	B-24? (Note: According to Mathews and Foreman claimed as a Consolidated PBY Catalina.)	PQ 15 West 6054	34	29 May 1943	16:27	B-17*	PQ 14 West 2987; PQ 14 West 2937
33	5 April 1943	17:45	Ventura	Ploudalmézeau; PQ 14 West 5939	35	30 December 1943	12:41	B-17	

=== Awards ===
- Iron Cross (1939) 2nd and 1st Class
- Honor Goblet of the Luftwaffe on 15 September 1941 as Oberleutnant in a Jagdgeschwader (Note: According to Schumann on 12 September 1941.)
- German Cross in Gold on 29 October 1942 as Oberleutnant in the 8./Jagdgeschwader 2
- Knight's Cross of the Iron Cross on 17 March 1943 as Hauptmann and Staffelkapitän of the 8./Jagdgeschwader 2 "Richthofen"

== Notes ==
Military offices
Preceded by Hauptmann Egon Mayer	Commander of III./Jagdgeschwader 2 "Richthofen"; 1 July 1943 – February 1944	Succeeded by Hauptmann Herbert Huppertz
Preceded by Hauptmann Walter Matoni	Commander of I./Jagdgeschwader 11; October 1944 – 25 November 1944	Succeeded by Hauptmann Rüdiger Kirchmayr
