= Walter Matoni =

German World War II fighter pilot (1917–1988)

- Matoni as a Hauptmann
- Born: 27 June 1917; Duisburg
- Died: 26 June 1988 (aged 70); Frankfurt
- Military career
- Allegiance: Nazi Germany (to 1945)
- Branch: Luftwaffe
- Service years: ?–1945
- Rank: Major (major)
- Units: JG 27, JG 26, JG 11, JG 2
- Commands: II./JG 2, I./JG 11
- Conflicts: World War II: Battle of Britain; Operation Barbarossa; Operation Overlord; Defense of the Reich
- Awards: Knight's Cross of the Iron Cross

Walter Matoni (27 June 1917 – 26 June 1988) was a Luftwaffe ace and recipient of the Knight's Cross of the Iron Cross (German: Ritterkreuz des Eisernen Kreuzes) during World War II. The Knight's Cross of the Iron Cross was the highest award in the military and paramilitary forces of Nazi Germany during World War II.

== Career ==
Matoni was born on 27 June 1917 in Duisburg. Feldwebel Matoni was assigned to 9./Jagdgeschwader 27 (JG 27—27th Fighter Wing) in the summer of 1940 and his first claim, a Hawker Hurricane followed on 30 September. (Note: For an explanation of Luftwaffe unit designations see Organisation of the Luftwaffe during World War II.) During mid 1941 Matoni operated over Russia and claimed three victories (Two DB-3's and an R-10). On 17 August 1941, Feldwebel Matoni was posted to II. Gruppe of Jagdgeschwader 26 "Schlageter" (JG 26—26th Fighter Wing). On 21 September, he was transferred to III. Gruppe of Jagdgeschwader 2 "Richthofen" (JG 2—2nd Fighter Wing) based at the airfield near Saint-Pol-sur-Ternoise.

He was badly wounded in aerial combat resulting in a lengthy convalescence, following which he served as an instructor with Jagdgruppe West from October 1942 to February 1943. On 28 February, Matoni was posted to 6. Staffel of JG 26.

He shot down a Supermarine Spitfire on 17 June as his fifth victory. On 31 August, Oberleutnant Matoni's Focke-Wulf Fw 190 A-6 (Werknummer 530118—factory number) was hit and he was wounded by return fire from United States Army Air Forces (USAAF) Boeing B-17 Flying Fortress bombers resulting in a forced landing at Montdidier. In December he claimed a Spitfire near Boulogne on 21 December as his 8th victory.

In an action against USAAF B-26 twin-engine bombers on 14 January 1944 Matoni shot down a Spitfire escorting the bombers, probably flown by Austrian-born S/L. Franz Colloredo-Mansfeld DFC (3 destroyed) of No. 132 Squadron RAF, who was killed. On 24 February Matoni shot down a USAAF B-24 four-engine bomber near Frankfurt for his 13th and JG 26's 2,000th victory.

Matoni was appointed Staffelkapitän (squadron leader) 5. Staffel of JG 26 on 25 February 1944. He succeeded Oberfeldwebel Adolf Glunz who was transferred. On 10 May, he was awarded the German Cross in Gold (Deutsches Kreuz in Gold) for 20 victories.

=== Group commander ===
On 15 August 1944, Hauptmann Matoni was appointed Gruppenkommandeur (group commander) of I. Gruppe of Jagdgeschwader 11 (JG 11—11th Fighter Wing). He took command of the Gruppe on 17 August. The Gruppe had just relocated to an airfield at Dammartin-en-Goële and had been augmented by a fourth Saffel following a period of rest an replenishment in Germany.

On 30 September, Matoni was transferred and appointed Gruppenkommandeur of I. Gruppe of JG 2, replacing Hauptmann Erich Hohagen who had been injured in combat. In consequence, command of I. Gruppe of JG 11 was passed to Hauptmann Bruno Stolle.

On 5 December, Matoni was so seriously injured in a takeoff accident at Merzhausen due to engine failure of his Fw 190. His injuries were so severe that he had to be replaced as Gruppenkommandeur of I. Gruppe. Command was temporarily given to Hauptmann Kurt Hoffmann before Hauptmann Franz Hrdlicka took command on 18 December. Despite this, he was appointed Gruppenkommandeur of II./JG 2 in January 1945 until 28 February. Matoni was awarded the Knight's Cross of the Iron Cross (Ritterkreuz des Eisernen Kreuzes) on 16 December 1944. (Note: According to Weal on 2 January 1945.) He ended the war at the Fighter Pilot's rest-home at Bad Wiessee.

== Later life ==
Just three years before his death, among other guests Matoni appeared on the British television show This Is Your Life on the 8 May 1985, the 40th anniversary of the German capitulation. He was guest on the Johnnie Johnson episode, celebrating the RAF ace' life. Matoni's presence owed to a British media-created legend that Johnson personally challenged the German to a duel over Normandy. Matoni died on 26 June 1988 in Frankfurt am Main.

== Summary of career ==
=== Aerial victory claims ===
According to Obermaier, Matoni was credited with 34 aerial victories claimed in over 400 claimed missions. He claimed three aerial victories on the Eastern Front, and further 31 aerial victories on the Western Front, including 14 were four-engined heavy bombers. Mathews and Foreman, authors of Luftwaffe Aces — Biographies and Victory Claims, researched the German Federal Archives and found records for 29 aerial victory claims, plus one further unconfirmed claim. This figure includes three aerial victories on the Eastern Front and 26 over the Western Allies, including 10 four-engined bombers.

Victory claims were logged to a map-reference (PQ = Planquadrat), for example "PQ 04 Ost N/AD-8/9". The Luftwaffe grid map (Jägermeldenetz) covered all of Europe, western Russia and North Africa and was composed of rectangles measuring 15 minutes of latitude by 30 minutes of longitude, an area of about 360 square miles (930 km^{2}). These sectors were then subdivided into 36 smaller units to give a location area 3 km × 4 km (1.9 mi × 2.5 mi) in size.

Chronicle of aerial victories
This along with the * (asterisk) indicates an Herausschuss (separation shot)—a severely damaged heavy bomber forced to separate from his combat box which was counted as an aerial victory. This and the ? (question mark) indicates information discrepancies listed by Caldwell, Prien, Stemmer, Rodeike, Bock, Mathews and Foreman.
Claim	Date	Time	Type	Location	Claim	Date	Time	Type	Location
– 9. Staffel of Jagdgeschwader 27 – Action at the Channel and over England — 26 June – 10 November 1940
1	30 September 1940	10:35	Hurricane	Tunbridge Wells					
– 9. Staffel of Jagdgeschwader 27 – Operation Barbarossa — 22 June – 16 October 1941
2	17 July 1941	03:45	DB-3	Pniewo	4	27 July 1941	04:05	DB-3	north of Lake Shiziskoje
3	26 July 1941	04:21	R-10 (Seversky)	east of Dukhovshchina					
– 6. Staffel of Jagdgeschwader 26 "Schlageter" – On the Western Front — 28 February – June 1943
5	17 June 1943	09:50	Spitfire	10 km (6.2 mi) northwest of Zeebrugge					
– 5. Staffel of Jagdgeschwader 26 "Schlageter" – On the Western Front — July – August 1943
6	15 July 1943	16:55	Spitfire	5 km (3.1 mi) southwest of Rue; 3–4 km (1.9–2.5 mi) north-northwest of Le Crotoy	7	27 August 1943	19:35? (Note: According to Mathews and Foreman claimed at 10:35.)	B-17	3 km (1.9 mi) northwest of Dunkirk; Merville
– 6. Staffel of Jagdgeschwader 26 "Schlageter" – On the Western Front — December 1943
8	21 December 1943	12:08	Spitfire	3 km (1.9 mi) south-southwest of Boulogne	9	30 December 1943	11:50	B-24	15 km (9.3 mi) northwest of Soissons
– 6. Staffel of Jagdgeschwader 26 "Schlageter" – On the Western Front — January 1944
10	11 January 1944	13:30	B-17	Tubbergen, 10 km (6.2 mi) north of Almelo	12? (Note: According to Mathews and Foreman this claim is unconfirmed.)	29 January 1944	11:30	B-17*	12 km (7.5 mi) southwest of Mühlhausen
11	14 January 1944	12:02	Spitfire	Doullens					
– 5. Staffel of Jagdgeschwader 26 "Schlageter" – On the Western Front — February – August 1944
13	24 February 1944	13:55	B-24	Rodenrot, district of Dillenburg	19	13 April 1944	13:25	B-17*	15 km (9.3 mi) west of Bitburg
14	6 March 1944	15:05	B-17	15 km (9.3 mi) east of Jülich	20	13 April 1944	16:00	P-47	32 km (20 mi) north of Kaiserslautern
15	8 March 1944	13:30	B-17	Mittelland Canal	21	17 June 1944	06:38	P-51	Caen
16	8 March 1944	13:40? (Note: According to Mathews and Foreman claimed at 13:50.)	B-17*	Nienburg-Weser north of Magdeburg	22	21 June 1944	21:46	P-38	west of Paris
17	12 April 1944	13:05	B-24*	southeast of Liège	23	24 June 1944	07:28	Spitfire	south of Évreux
18	12 April 1944	13:28? (Note: According to Mathews and Foreman claimed at 13:21.)	B-24*	south of Liège	24	2 July 1944	20:52	Spitfire	northwest of Caen
– Stab I. Gruppe of Jagdgeschwader 11 – Invasion of France — August 1944
25	20 August 1944	15:56	P-47	PQ 04 Ost N/AD-8/9, vicinity of Paris					
– Stab I. Gruppe of Jagdgeschwader 11 – On the Western Front — August 1944
26	28 September 1944	10:45	Spitfire	PQ 05 Ost S/JM/JN, vicinity of Nijmegen	27	4 October 1944	13:37	P-47	PQ 05 Ost S/NN-2/3, vicinity of Liège
– Stab I. Gruppe of Jagdgeschwader 2 "Richthofen" – Defense of the Reich — October – November 1944
28	20 October 1944	10:45	P-38	PQ 05 Ost NP-2 east of Köln-Bonn	30	19 November 1944	10:29	P-47	southwest of Düren
29	29 October 1944	15:13	P-38	PQ 05 Ost NO-6; Wesseling					

=== Awards ===
- Flugzeugführerabzeichen
- Front Flying Clasp of the Luftwaffe
- Wound Badge (1939) in Black and Silver
- Iron Cross (1939)
  - 2nd Class (12 September 1940)
  - 1st Class (November 1940)
- Honor Goblet of the Luftwaffe on 8 May 1944 as Oberleutnant and pilot (Note: According to Obermaier on 31 March 1944.)
- German Cross in Gold on 1 October 1944 as Oberleutnant in the 5./Jagdgeschwader 26
- Knight's Cross of the Iron Cross on 16 December 1944 as Hauptmann and Gruppenkommandeur of the II./Jagdgeschwader 2 "Richthofen" (Note: According to Scherzer as Gruppenkommandeur of the I./Jagdgeschwader 2 "Richthofen".)

== Notes ==
Military offices
Preceded by Oberleutnant Hans Schrangl	Commander of I. Jagdgeschwader 11; 15 August 1944 – November 1944	Succeeded by Hauptmann Bruno Stolle
Preceded by Hauptmann Georg Schroder	Commander of III. Jagdgeschwader 2 January 1945 – February 1945	Succeeded by Hauptmann Fritz Karch
