= Bonnières, Oise =

Bonnières
- Commune
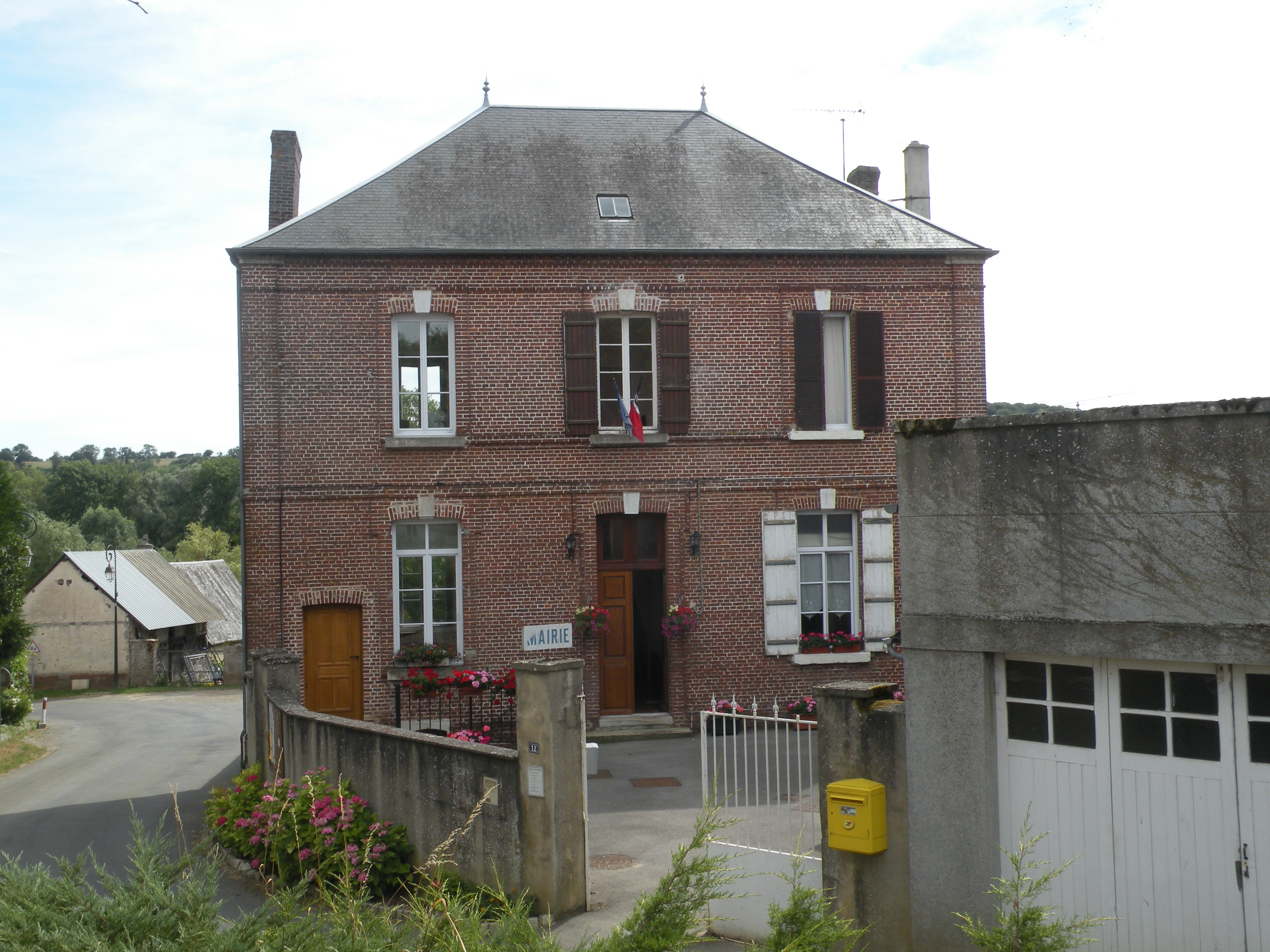
- The town hall in Bonnières
- Location of Bonnières
- Location within France Location within Hauts-de-France
- Coordinates: 49°30′33″N 1°58′04″E
- Country: France
- Region: Hauts-de-France
- Department: Oise
- Arrondissement: Beauvais
- Canton: Grandvilliers
- Intercommunality: Picardie Verte

Government
  - Mayor (2020–2026): Franciane Bizet
- Area^{1}: 8.44 km^{2} (3.26 sq mi)
- Highest elevation: 167 m (548 ft)
- Lowest elevation: 82 m (269 ft)
- Population (2023): 201
  - Density: 23.8/km^{2} (61.7/sq mi)
- Time zone: UTC+01:00 (CET)
  - Summer (DST): UTC+02:00 (CEST)
- INSEE/Postal code: 60084 /60112
- ^{1} French Land Register data, which excludes lakes, ponds, glaciers > 1 km^{2} (0.386 sq mi or 247 acres) and river estuaries.

Bonnières (French pronunciation: [bɔnjɛʁ]) is a commune in the Oise department in northern France.

== Population ==
Historical population
Year	Pop.	±% p.a.
1968	148	—
1975	125	−2.38%
1982	132	+0.78%
1990	171	+3.29%
1999	172	+0.06%
2007	164	−0.59%
2012	155	−1.12%
2017	169	+1.74%
2023	201	+2.93%
Source: INSEE

== See also ==
- Communes of the Oise department
