= Eugen-Ludwig Zweigart =

German World War II flying ace (1914–1944)

- Born: 3 May 1914; Saargemünd, German Empire (today Sarreguemines, France)
- Died: 8 June 1944 (aged 30); Les Champeaux, France
- Burial place: Saint-Désir-de-Lisieux German war cemetery, Lisieux, Normandy
- Military career
- Allegiance: Nazi Germany
- Branch: Luftwaffe
- Service years: 1935–1944
- Rank: Oberleutnant (first lieutenant)
- Unit: JG 54
- Conflicts: World War II: Eastern Front; Western Front †
- Awards: Knight's Cross of the Iron Cross

Eugen-Ludwig Zweigart (3 May 1914 – 8 June 1944) a former German fighter ace in the Luftwaffe. He was a recipient of the Knight's Cross of the Iron Cross during World War II. The Knight's Cross of the Iron Cross, and its variants were the highest awards in the military and paramilitary forces of Nazi Germany during World War II. He was credited with 69 victories.

== Early life and career ==
Zweigart was born on 3 May 1914 in Saargemünd of Alsace–Lorraine within the German Empire, now Sarreguemines, a commune in the Moselle department of the Grand Est administrative region in north-eastern France. He volunteered for military service in the Wehrmacht of Nazi Germany in October 1935. Initially serving in the Army, he later transferred to the Luftwaffe (air force). Trained as a fighter pilot, (Note: Flight training in the Luftwaffe progressed through the levels A1, A2 and B1, B2, referred to as A/B flight training. A training included theoretical and practical training in aerobatics, navigation, long-distance flights and dead-stick landings. The B courses included high-altitude flights, instrument flights, night landings and training to handle the aircraft in difficult situations.) Zweigart was posted to 9. Staffel (9th squadron) of Jagdgeschwader 54 (JG 54—54th Fighter Wing), a squadron of III. Gruppe (3rd group) of JG 54, in October 1940.

== World War II ==
World War II in Europe began on Friday 1 September 1939 when German forces invaded Poland. In October 1940, III. Gruppe was based at an airfield at Guînes where it participated in the Battle of Britain against the Royal Air Force (RAF). At the time, 9. Staffel was commanded by Oberleutnant Richard Hausmann while III. Gruppe was temporarily led by Oberleutnant Hans-Ekkehard Bob who transferred command to Hauptmann Arnold Lignitz on 4 November. On 21 October, the Gruppe was withdrawn from the English Channel and dispersed to multiple airfields in the Netherlands with 9. Staffel sent to Amsterdam-Schiphol Airfield and then to Haamstede three days later. Here on 10 November, Zweigart claimed his first aerial victory, a Bristol Blenheim bomber shot down northeast of De Kooy. His only claim during the Battle of Britain

On 29 March 1941, III. Gruppe was ordered to Graz-Thalerhof in preparation for the Balkans campaign. On 20 April, III. Gruppe was withdrawn from combat operation, relocating to Belgrad-Semlin. On 4 May, the Gruppe began its transfer to Airfield Stolp-Reitz in Pomerania, present-day Słupsk, by train, arriving at Stolp-Reitz on 10 May.

=== Operation Barbarossa ===
At Stolp-Reitz, JG 54 upgraded their aircraft to the Messerschmitt Bf 109 F-2. For the next four weeks, the pilots familiarized themselves with the new aircraft before on 15 June, III. Gruppe was ordered to Blumenfeld in East Prussia, present-day Karczarningken in the Kaliningrad Oblast, in preparation for Operation Barbarossa, the invasion of the Soviet Union. During the upcoming invasion, JG 54 would be deployed in the area of Army Group North, was subordinated to I. Fliegerkorps (1st Air Corps) and supported the 16th and 18th Army as well as the Panzer Group 4 in their strategic objective to reach Leningrad.

On 22 June, the first day of Operation Barbarossa, Zweigart claimed his second aerial victory, a Polikarpov I-153 fighter. On 12 September, the German advance into the Soviet Union, had III. Gruppe relocate to Ziverskaya. Here on 11 November, Zweigart made a forced landing at Sablin, near Lyuban, following combat damage sustained to his Bf 109 F-2 (Werknummer 12943—factory number). By end 1941, Zweigart had claimed seven further aerial victories, taking his total to nine. For this, he had been awarded both classes of the Iron Cross (Eisernes Kreuz).

On 28 September 1942, Zweigart shot down and killed Kapitan Dmitriy Buryak from 3 GvIAP (Guards Fighter Aviation Regiment—Gvardeskiy Istrebitelny Aviatsionny Polk). Buryak had been credited with eleven aerial victories claimed in 170 combat missions. On 22 January 1943, Zweigart was awarded the Knight's Cross of the Iron Cross (Ritterkreuz des Eisernen Kreuzes) for 54 aerial victories claimed.

=== Defense of the Reich ===
In mid-February 1943, III. Gruppe of JG 54 was withdrawn from the Eastern Front and ordered to Vendeville, France where it was subordinated to the Geschwaderstab (headquarters unit) of Jagdgeschwader 26 "Schlageter" (JG 26—26th Fighter Wing). The Gruppe was equipped with the Bf 109 G-4 armed with 20 mm MG 151/20 cannons installed in conformal gun pods under the wings. The original plan was to exchange JG 26 which had been fighting on the Western Front with JG 54. The plan was cancelled in March. Instead of III. Gruppe of JG 54 returning to the Eastern Front, the Gruppe was ordered to Bad Zwischenahn on 25 March and then to Oldenburg Airfield two days later. Here, the Gruppe was subordinated to the 2. Jagd-Division (2nd Fighter Division) which was fighting in defense of the Reich.

Late on 22 June, III. Gruppe moved from Oldenburg to Deelen Airfield in the Netherlands. Here, Zweigart claimed his first heavy bomber shot down. That day, the United States Army Air Forces (USAAF) VIII Bomber Command, later renamed to Eighth Air Force, attacked various targets of opportunity in East Frisia. III. Gruppe intercepted a formation of Boeing B-17 Flying Fortress bombers near Dörpen where Zweigart claimed a B-17 bomber shot down. On 8 July, the Gruppe relocated again, moving from Deelen to Amsterdam-Schiphol Airfield. Here on 18 July, Zweigart claimed a RAF North American P-51 Mustang fighter shot down west of Scheveningen.

On 25 July during Blitz Week, the USAAF VIII Bomber Command attacked Hamburg and Kiel. In order to fragment German aerial defenses, Allied forces also attacked the Fokker factory in Amsterdam, the airfields at Amsterdam-Schiphol and Woensdrecht, and a coking factory at Ghent. Defending against these attacks, Zweigart claimed a Supermarine Spitfire fighter shot down west of Wijk aan Zee. Two days later, Zweigart was shot down in his Bf 109 G-6 (Werknummer 15678) by Spitfire fighters, bailing out near Noorden.

On 6 March 1944, the USAAF targeted various industrial centers in and around Berlin. In total, the Eighth and Fifteenth Air Force mustered 730 heavy bombers with an escort of 796 aircraft in the first, full-scale daylight attack on Berlin. Defending against this attack, Zweigart claimed three B-17 bombers shot down in combat during the morning and afternoon.

=== Normandy landings and death ===
When Allied forces launched Operation Overlord, the invasion of German-occupied Western Europe on 6 June, III. Gruppe was immediately ordered to relocate to Villacoublay Airfield. That day, the Gruppe reached Nancy, arriving in Villacoublay the following day where it was subordinated to II. Fliegerkorps (2nd Air Corps). Its primary objective was to fly fighter-bomber missions in support of the German ground forces. The Gruppe flew its first missions on 7 June to the combat area east of Caen and the Orne estuary.

A days later on 8 June, Zweigart was shot down flying Focke-Wulf Fw 190 A-8 (Werknummer 170736) in aerial combat near Les Champeaux, France. He bailed out and was allegedly shot and killed while hanging in his parachute. He was interred at the Saint-Désir-de-Lisieux German war cemetery.

== Summary of career ==
=== Aerial victory claims ===
According to US historian David T. Zabecki, Zweigart was credited with 69 aerial victories. Scutts and Spick also lists him with 69 aerial victories claimed in an unknown number of combat missions. This figure includes 54 aerial victories on the Eastern Front and 15 over the Western Allies. Mathews and Foreman, authors of Luftwaffe Aces — Biographies and Victory Claims, researched the German Federal Archives and found records for 66 aerial victory claims plus two further unconfirmed claims. This figure includes 52 aerial victories on the Eastern Front and 14 on the Western Front, including ten four-engined bombers.

Victory claims were logged to a map-reference (PQ = Planquadrat), for example "PQ 10131". The Luftwaffe grid map (Jägermeldenetz) covered all of Europe, western Russia and North Africa and was composed of rectangles measuring 15 minutes of latitude by 30 minutes of longitude, an area of about 360 square miles (930 km^{2}). These sectors were then subdivided into 36 smaller units to give a location area 3 km × 4 km (1.9 mi × 2.5 mi) in size.

Chronicle of aerial victories
This and the – (dash) indicates unconfirmed aerial victory claims for which Zweigart did not receive credit. This along with the * (asterisk) indicates an Herausschuss (separation shot)—a severely damaged heavy bomber forced to separate from his combat box which was counted as an aerial victory. This and the ? (question mark) indicates information discrepancies listed by Prien, Stemmer, Rodeike, Bock, Mathews and Foreman.
Claim	Date	Time	Type	Location	Claim	Date	Time	Type	Location
– 9. Staffel of Jagdgeschwader 54 – Action at the Channel and over England — October 1940 – 29 March 1941
1	10 November 1940	12:20	Blenheim	25 km (16 mi) northeast of De Kooy					
– 9. Staffel of Jagdgeschwader 54 – Operation Barbarossa — 22 June – 5 December 1941
2	22 June 1941	14:25? (Note: According to Mathews and Foreman claimed at 14:21.)	I-153		6	11 September 1941	09:55	I-18 (MiG-1)	
3	30 June 1941	12:32	SB-3	Dünaburg	7	30 September 1941	16:30	ground-attack aircraft? (Note: According to Mathews and Foreman claimed as an Ilyushin Il-2.)	
4	6 July 1941	18:50	SB-3		8	5 November 1941	13:05	I-26 (Yak-1)	Kolpino
5	14 July 1941	16:20	SB-2		9	1 December 1941	09:27	I-18 (MiG-1)	
– 9. Staffel of Jagdgeschwader 54 – Eastern Front — 6 December 1941 – 30 April 1942
10	9 February 1942	15:57	R-Z? (Note: According to Mathews and Foreman claimed as an Polikarpov R-5.)		13	6 April 1942	08:03	P-40	
11	9 February 1942	16:12	I-26 (Yak-1)		14	25 April 1942	11:32	MiG-3	
12	4 April 1942	15:14	Pe-2		15	25 April 1942	11:40	MiG-3	
– 9. Staffel of Jagdgeschwader 54 – Eastern Front — 1 May 1942 – 3 February 1943
16	28 May 1942	09:04	I-16	PQ 10131 east of Shlisselburg	35	20 September 1942	17:28	LaGG-3	PQ 10214; 30 km (19 mi) west-southwest of Shlisselburg
—	23 July 1942	—	P-40		36	21 September 1942	11:07	P-40	PQ 10161 southeast of Shlisselburg
17	30 July 1942	19:45	I-18 (MiG-3)	PQ 18224; 25 km (16 mi) east-southeast of Staraya Russa	37	28 September 1942	14:46	LaGG-3	PQ 00321; 20 km (12 mi) northwest of Shlisselburg
18	2 August 1942	16:52	MiG-3	PQ 00243; 20 km (12 mi) southeast of Leningrad	38	28 September 1942	15:21	Hurricane	PQ 00264; 10 km (6.2 mi) southwest of Shlisselburg
19	2 August 1942	19:12	MiG-3	PQ 00164, Aleksandrowka; 10 km (6.2 mi) southeast of Leningrad	39	29 September 1942	06:54? (Note: According to Mathews and Foreman claimed at 06:56.)	LaGG-3	PQ 00251, Oserki; 15 km (9.3 mi) west-southwest of Shlisselburg
20	13 August 1942	17:53	P-40	PQ 18261; 30 km (19 mi) east-southeast of Staraya Russa	40	26 October 1942	08:45	Il-2	PQ 28263; 20 km (12 mi) southwest of Waldi
21	13 August 1942	17:55	P-40	PQ 18264; 30 km (19 mi) east-southeast of Staraya Russa	41	26 October 1942	13:57	LaGG-3	PQ 18334; 30 km (19 mi) east-southeast of Staraya Russa
22	28 August 1942	11:23	MiG-3	PQ 10181 east of Mga	42	30 October 1942	08:55	LaGG-3	PQ 28123; 40 km (25 mi) northwest of Demyansk
23	29 August 1942	10:28	MiG-3	PQ 10164 vicinity of Putilowo	43	30 October 1942	09:37	LaGG-3	PQ 29783, Tschasyja; 45 km (28 mi) north-northwest of Demyansk
24	29 August 1942	10:31	MiG-3	PQ 10164 vicinity of Putilowo	44	7 November 1942	08:48	P-40	PQ 38742 vicinity of Ostashkov
25	31 August 1942	17:16	MiG-3	PQ 10191, Kilosi	45	7 November 1942	08:57	P-40	PQ 28843; 15 km (9.3 mi) northwest of Ostashkov
26	31 August 1942	17:20	MiG-3	PQ 10164 vicinity of Putilowo	46	14 November 1942	11:35	LaGG-3	PQ 10262; 25 km (16 mi) west-southwest of Shlisselburg
27	1 September 1942	10:55	LaGG-3	PQ 10254; 30 km (19 mi) west-southwest of Shlisselburg	47	22 November 1942	11:45	Pe-2	PQ 90441; 10 km (6.2 mi) north of Volosovo
28	2 September 1942	10:12	LaGG-3	PQ 00212; 20 km (12 mi) east of Leningrad	48	17 December 1942	10:40? (Note: According to Mathews and Foreman claimed at 10:50.)	MiG-3	PQ 46214; 20 km (12 mi) south of Zubtsov
29	2 September 1942	18:39	MiG-3	PQ 10113 vicinity of Shlisselburg	49? (Note: This claim is not listed by Mathews and Foreman.)	25 December 1942	12:48	Il-2	PQ 07741
30	3 September 1942	11:02	P-40	PQ 10254; 30 km (19 mi) west-southwest of Shlisselburg	50	25 December 1942	12:50	Il-2	PQ 07742; 20 km (12 mi) southwest of Velikiye Luki
31	3 September 1942	11:07	P-40	PQ 10254; 30 km (19 mi) west-southwest of Shlisselburg	51	29 December 1942	08:36	Yak-1	PQ 07692; 10 km (6.2 mi) east of Velikiye Luki
32	9 September 1942	11:12	P-40	PQ 10242; 25 km (16 mi) east-southeast of Shlisselburg	52	29 December 1942	08:40	La-5	PQ 07733; 10 km (6.2 mi) southwest of Velikiye Luki
33	9 September 1942	17:20	MiG-3	PQ 00264; 10 km (6.2 mi) southwest of Shlisselburg	53	29 December 1942	08:49	La-5	PQ 07591; 15 km (9.3 mi) south of Velikiye Luki
34	15 September 1942	06:04	P-40	PQ 10241; 25 km (16 mi) east-southeast of Shlisselburg	54	29 December 1942	11:16	Yak-1	PQ 07594; 10 km (6.2 mi) southwest of Velikiye Luki
– 9. Staffel of Jagdgeschwader 54 – Defense of the Reich — 27 March – August 1943
55	25 June 1943	09:03	B-17	southwest of Dörpen	58	27 July 1943	20:13	Ventura	PQ 05 Ost S/GK; Haarlem
56	18 July 1943	07:15	P-51	10 km (6.2 mi) west of Scheveningen	59	12 August 1943	08:52	B-17	PQ 05 Ost S/LN-3/6; Kerken-Kempen
57	25 July 1943	15:19	Spitfire	west of Wijk aan Zee					
– 7. Staffel of Jagdgeschwader 54 – Defense of the Reich — November 1943 – March 1944
60	29 November 1943	14:58	B-17? (Note: According to Mathews and Foreman claimed as an Herausschuss (separation shot)—a severely damaged heavy bomber forced to separate from his combat box which was counted as an aerial victory.)	Cloppenburg	63	6 March 1944	11:58	B-17	PQ 05 Ost EQ; Sögel-Cloppenburg
61	20 February 1944	12:57	B-17	PQ 15 Ost JD	64	6 March 1944	14:49	B-17	Reinsehlen
62	20 February 1944	13:06	B-17*	PQ 15 Ost JE	—	6 March 1944	—	B-17	
– 8. Staffel of Jagdgeschwader 54 – Defense of the Reich — March 1944
65	18 March 1944	15:20	B-17	PQ 04 Ost CQ-6; Lahr-Biberach					
– Stab III. Gruppe of Jagdgeschwader 54 – Defense of the Reich — May 1944
66	19 May 1944	13:10	B-24*	PQ 15 Ost HB-4	67	27 May 1944	12:19	B-17	PQ 04 Ost DO-6/DP-4; Ballons de Voges

=== Awards ===
- Iron Cross (1939) 2nd and 1st Class
- Honor Goblet of the Luftwaffe on 26 October 1942 as Oberfeldwebel and pilot
- German Cross in Gold on 17 November 1942 as Oberfeldwebel in the 9./Jagdgeschwader 54
- Knight's Cross of the Iron Cross on 22 January 1943 as Oberfeldwebel and pilot in the 5./Jagdgeschwader 54
