= Kurt Knappe =

German fighter ace and Knight's Cross recipient

- Born: 2 June 1918; Berlin
- Died: 3 September 1943 (aged 25); Evreux, France
- Cause of death: Killed in action
- Burial place: Saint-Désir-de-Lisieux German war cemetery, Lisieux, Normandy
- Military career
- Allegiance: Nazi Germany
- Branch: Luftwaffe
- Service years: ?-1943
- Rank: Oberfeldwebel
- Units: JG 51; JG 2
- Conflicts: World War II: Operation Barbarossa; Defense of the Reich
- Awards: Knight's Cross of the Iron Cross

Kurt Knappe (2 June 1918 – 3 September 1943) was a Luftwaffe ace and recipient of the Knight's Cross of the Iron Cross during World War II. The Knight's Cross of the Iron Cross, and its variants were the highest awards in the military and paramilitary forces of Nazi Germany during World War II. On 3 September 1943, Knappe was killed over Evreux, France after attacking a formation of Boeing B-17 Flying Fortress bombers. During his career he was credited with 56 victories, 51 on the Eastern Front and 5 on the Western Front.

== Career ==
On 3 November 1942, Knappe was awarded the Knight's Cross of the Iron Cross (Ritterkreuz des Eisernen Kreuzes) for 51 aerial victories claimed.

On 3 September 1943, Knappe was killed in action in aerial combat with Boeing B-17 Flying Fortress bombers. His Focke-Wulf Fw 190 A-6 (Werknummer 470016—factory number) crashed on the road north of Le Neubourg, 5 kilometers (3.1 miles) northwest of Evreux. He is interred at Saint-Désir-de-Lisieux German war cemetery near Lisieux, Normandy, France.

== Summary of career ==
=== Aerial victory claims ===
According to US historian David T. Zabecki, Knappe was credited with 56 aerial victories. Matthews and Foreman, authors of Luftwaffe Aces — Biographies and Victory Claims, researched the German Federal Archives and found records for 55 aerial victory claims with 51 claimed on the Eastern Front and four heavy bombers on the Western Front.

Victory claims were logged to a map-reference (PQ = Planquadrat), for example "PQ 64512". The Luftwaffe grid map (Jägermeldenetz) covered all of Europe, western Russia and North Africa and was composed of rectangles measuring 15 minutes of latitude by 30 minutes of longitude, an area of about 360 square miles (930 km^{2}). These sectors were then subdivided into 36 smaller units to give a location area 3 km × 4 km (1.9 mi × 2.5 mi) in size.

Chronicle of aerial victories
This and the – (dash) indicates unconfirmed aerial victory claims for which Knappe did not receive credit. This and the ? (question mark) indicates information discrepancies listed by Prien, Stemmer, Rodeike, Bock, Mathews and Foreman.
| Claim | Date | Time | Type | Location | Claim | Date | Time | Type | Location |
– 5. Staffel of Jagdgeschwader 51 – Operation Barbarossa — 22 June – 5 December 1941
| 1 | 26 July 1941 | 12:35 | DB-3 | | 5 | 13 September 1941 | 10:10 | DB-3 | east of Konotop |
| 2 | 26 August 1941 | 18:15 | Douglas | 15 km (9.3 mi) east of Kaluga | 6 | 28 September 1941 | 10:00 | Pe-2 | |
| 3 | 30 August 1941 | 17.40 | Pe-2 | | 7 | 11 October 1941 | 11:07 | Pe-2 | |
| 4 | 6 September 1941 | 13:35 | R-3 | | 8 | 17 November 1941 | 14:32 | DB-3 | |
– 5. Staffel of Jagdgeschwader 51 "Mölders" – Eastern Front — 6 December 1941 – 30 April 1942
| 9 | 21 January 1942 | 12:27 | Pe-2 | | 15 | 6 March 1942 | 11:45 | I-18 | |
| 10 | 6 February 1942 | 12:45 | R-Z | | 16 | 6 March 1942 | 12:15 | Pe-2 | |
| 11 | 19 February 1942 | 10:50 | I-16 | | 17 | 7 March 1942 | 14:10 | I-18 | southwest of Medyn |
| 12 | 4 March 1942 | 15:55 | I-16 | | 18 | 7 March 1942 | 14:15 | I-18 | southwest of Medyn |
| 13 | 6 March 1942 | 09:53 | I-18 | | 19 | 29 March 1942 | 07:59 | Pe-2 | northeast of Dugino |
| 14 | 6 March 1942 | 10:00 | I-18 | | 20 | 31 March 1942 | 13:37 | Il-2 | southeast of Yukhnov |
– 5. Staffel of Jagdgeschwader 51 "Mölders" – Eastern Front — 1 May – 4 October 1942
| 21 | 22 May 1942 | 12:00 | R-Z | | 36 | 13 August 1942 | 08:52 | Il-2 | PQ 64512 |
| 22 | 22 May 1942 | 12:03 | R-Z | | 37 | 18 August 1942 | 08:15 | Yak-1 | PQ 54211 |
| — | 29 May 1942 | — | unknown | | 38 | 22 August 1942 | 12:10 | MiG-3 | PQ 55764 |
| 23 | 4 June 1942 | 06:15 | MiG-1 | | 39 | 22 August 1942 | 18:12 | MiG-3 | PQ 64171, west of Belyov |
| 24 | 4 June 1942 | 06:20 | MiG-1 | | 40 | 23 August 1942 | 10:05 | LaGG-3 | PQ 64171, west of Belyov |
| 25 | 12 June 1942 | 12:10 | Il-2 | | 41 | 23 August 1942 | 10:08 | LaGG-3 | PQ 64171, west of Belyov |
| 26 | 7 July 1942 | 11:23 | MiG-3 | | 42 | 9 September 1942 | 10:57 | Il-2 | east of Rzhev |
| 27 | 9 July 1942 | 07:35 | MiG-3 | | 43 | 9 September 1942 | 11:01 | Il-2 | northeast of Rzhev |
| 28 | 9 July 1942 | 07:37 | MiG-3 | | 44 | 9 September 1942 | 17:30 | Il-2 | PQ 47754 |
| 29 | 9 July 1942 | 07:47 | MiG-3 | | 45 | 14 September 1942 | 10:01 | MiG-3 | PQ 47584, southeast of Rzhev |
| 30 | 17 July 1942 | 13:05 | MiG-1 | | 46 | 14 September 1942 | 10:14 | I-180 | PQ 47581, Dugino |
| 31 | 2 August 1942 | 13:05 | Il-2 | PQ 47563 | 47 | 21 September 1942 | 08:02 | R-5 | PQ 47812 |
| 32 | 2 August 1942 | 18:17 | Pe-2 | PQ 47572 | 48 | 23 September 1942 | 15:05 | I-16 | PQ 47612 |
| 33 | 4 August 1942 | 10:16 | MiG-3 | PQ 47591 | 49 | 1 October 1942 | 09:35 | R-5 | PQ 46214 |
| 34 | 4 August 1942 | 14:25 | Pe-2 | PQ 47563 | 50 | 4 October 1942 | 13:05 | LaGG-3 | 8 km (5.0 mi) east of Peno |
| 35 | 5 August 1942 | 18:10 | Pe-2 | PQ 56432 | 51 | 4 October 1942 | 13:10 | LaGG-3 | 5 km (3.1 mi) southeast of Peno |
– 7. Staffel of Jagdgeschwader 2 "Richthofen" – On the Western Front — December 1942 – June 1943
| 52 | 30 December 1942 | 11:45 | B-17 | PQ 14 West 5813 | 54 | 28 June 1943 | 19:03 | B-17 | PQ 15 West 604 |
| 53 | 23 January 1943 | 14:12 | B-17 | PQ 14 West 4975, Carhaix | | | | | |
– 10. Staffel of Jagdgeschwader 2 "Richthofen" – On the Western Front — September 1943
| 55? (Note: This claim is not listed by Mathews and Foreman.) | 2 September 1943 | 20:25 | Spitfire | Béthune | 56 | 3 September 1943 | 09:50 | B-17 | vicinity of Paris |

=== Awards ===
- Aviator badge
- Front Flying Clasp of the Luftwaffe
- Iron Cross (1939) 2nd and 1st Class
- Honor Goblet of the Luftwaffe on 18 May 1942 as Unteroffizier and pilot
- German Cross in Gold on 24 September 1942 as Unteroffizier in the 5./Jagdgeschwader 51
- Knight's Cross of the Iron Cross on 3 November 1942 as Unteroffizier and pilot in the 5./Jagdgeschwader 51 "Mölders"
