= Kurt Ubben =

German World War II flying ace (1911–1944)

- Ubben as a Hauptmann
- Born: 18 November 1911; Dorstadt, Kingdom of Prussia, German Empire
- Died: 27 April 1944 (aged 32) near Fère-en-Tardenois, German-occupied France
- Cause of death: Killed in action
- Burial place: Saint-Désir-de-Lisieux German war cemetery, Normandy
- Military career
- Allegiance: Weimar Republic; Nazi Germany
- Branch: Reichsmarine (1931–35); Luftwaffe (1935–44)
- Service years: 1931–1944
- Rank: Major (major)
- Nickname: "Kuddel"
- Units: SSS Gorch Fock; JGr 186, JG 77, JG 53, JG 2
- Commands: 8./JG 77, III./JG 77, JG 53, JG 2
- Conflicts: See battles: World War II Invasion of Poland Battle of Britain Eastern Front; Operation Barbarossa North African campaign Defense of the Reich †
- Awards: Knight's Cross of the Iron Cross with Oak Leaves

Kurt "Kuddel" Ubben (18 November 1911 – 27 April 1944) was a German Luftwaffe wing commander and military aviator during World War II, a fighter ace listed with 110 aerial victories—that is, 111 aerial combat encounters resulting in the destruction of the enemy aircraft—claimed in approximately 500 combat missions.

Born in Dorstadt, Ubben volunteered for military service with the Reichsmarine in 1931. He transferred to the Luftwaffe of Nazi Germany in 1935. Following flight training, he was posted to Jagdgruppe 186 (JG 186—186 Fighter Group) and later to Jagdgeschwader 77 (JG 77—77th Fighter Wing). He claimed his first aerial victory during the Battle of France on 10 May 1940. In July 1940, he was appointed Staffelkapitän (squadron leader) of 8. Staffel (8th squadron) of JG 77. With this unit, Ubben then fought in the Battle of Greece and Operation Barbarossa, the German invasion of the Soviet Union. He was awarded the Knight's Cross of the Iron Cross on 4 September 1941 and was given command of III. Gruppe (3rd group) of JG 77 two days later. His unit transferred to the North African Theatre of operations, taking part in the retreat from Tunisia to Sicily and Italy. He received the Knight's Cross of the Iron Cross with Oak Leaves on 23 July 1942 and claimed his 101st aerial victory in January 1943.

In March 1944, Ubben was appointed Geschwaderkommodore (wing commander) of Jagdgeschwader 2 "Richthofen" (JG 2—2nd Fighter Wing), tasked with defense of the Reich missions. He was killed in action in aerial combat with United States Army Air Forces 356th Fighter Group near Fère-en-Tardenois, France on 27 April 1944.

== Early life and career ==
Ubben, the son of an officer in the Imperial German Navy, was born on 18 November 1911 in Dorstadt, at the time in the Province of Hanover of the Kingdom of Prussia, of the German Empire. On 1 October 1931, he joined the military service with the Reichsmarine, the German Navy during the Weimar Republic. During his service with the Reichsmarine, he went on a cruise on board the school ship Gorch Fock. On 1 April 1935, Ubben transferred to the newly emerging Luftwaffe of Nazi Germany and was trained as a naval aviator in 1935/36. (Note: Flight training in the Luftwaffe progressed through the levels A1, A2 and B1, B2, referred to as A/B flight training. A training included theoretical and practical training in aerobatics, navigation, long-distance flights and dead-stick landings. The B courses included high-altitude flights, instrument flights, night landings and training to handle the aircraft in difficult situations. For pilots destined to fly multi-engine aircraft, the training was completed with the Luftwaffe Advanced Pilot's Certificate (Erweiterter Luftwaffen-Flugzeugführerschein), also known as the C-Certificate.)

On 1 September 1936, Ubben was transferred to 1. Staffel (1st squadron) of Jagdgeschwader 136 (JG 136—136th Fighter Wing), and in November was posted to the newly created II. Gruppe (2nd group) of Jagdggruppe 186 (II./186—186th Fighter Group). (Note: For an explanation of the meaning of Luftwaffe unit designation see Organization of the Luftwaffe during World War II.) This group, also known as the Trägerjagdgruppe (Carrier Fighter Group), was destined to be stationed on the aircraft carrier Graf Zeppelin which was never completed. II./186 (T) initially consisted of two squadrons, 4./186 (T) equipped with the Junkers Ju 87 dive bomber, (Note: The suffix 'T' denotes Träger (carrier) in German use.) and 6./186 (T), a fighter squadron to which Ubben was assigned. At the time, 6./186 (T) was equipped with the Messerschmitt Bf 109B, the carrier variant Bf 109 T-1 was not available, and trained at Travemünde on a mockup carrier landing deck. On 15 July 1939, II./186 (T) was augmented by a third squadron, designated 5./186 (T) to which Ubben was transferred.

== World War II ==
World War II in Europe began on Friday, 1 September 1939, when German forces invaded Poland. In preparation, 5./186 (T) had been moved to Brüsterort, near Königsberg on 22 August. In the early morning hours of 1 September, 5./186 (T) flew its first combat missions, providing fighter protection for 4./186 (T) attacking the naval base of the Polish Navy at Hel and for the old German battleship Schleswig-Holstein bombarding the Polish military transit depot at Westerplatte in the Free City of Danzig on the Baltic Sea. The next, II./186 (T) flew further bomber escort missions and was withdrawn from this theater on 6 September, relocating to Hage, East Frisia.

JG 77 insignia

On 1 May 1940, Ubben was promoted to Leutnant (second lieutenant) with a rank age dated back to 1 October 1936, and at the same time received the rank of Oberleutnant (first lieutenant) of the reserves with a rank age dated back to 1 June 1939. His first aerial victory was over a Dutch Fokker D.XXI fighter claimed over the Netherlands on 10 May 1940, the opening day of the Battle of France. This earned him the Iron Cross 2nd Class (Eisernes Kreuz zweiter Klasse) that day. In support of Operation Weserübung, the Germany assault on Denmark and Norway, II./186 (T) was ordered to relocate to Norway on 2 June. There it augmented II. Gruppe of Jagdgeschwader 77 (JG 77—77th Fighter Wing) and was based at Trondheim.

Following the decision by Adolf Hitler to halt work on the aircraft carrier Graf Zeppelin, II./186 (T) was redesignated and became the III. Gruppe of JG 77. In consequence, Ubben's Staffel 5./186 (T) became the 8. Staffel of JG 77 which was headed by Oberleutnant Lorenz Weber. On 22 July 1940, Ubben was made Staffelkapitän (squadron leader) of 8. Staffel of JG 77 after his predecessor Weber was killed in action the day before. A week later, III. Gruppe was withdrawn from this theater of operations and relocated to Döberitz where it was tasked with fighter protection of Berlin. In November, JG 77 was ordered to the English Channel to continue fighting the Royal Air Force (RAF) in the aftermath of the Battle of Britain. 8. Staffel moved to an airfield at Cherbourg-en-Cotentin on 30 November.

=== Balkan and Battle of Crete ===
In preparation for Operation Marita, the German invasion of Greece, III. Gruppe of JG 77 was moved to Deta in western Romania on 4 April 1941. Ubben claimed a No. 33 Squadron Hawker Hurricane fighter near Larissa on 19 April, although his Bf 109 E-7 (Werknummer 5198—factory number) was badly damaged in the engagement and Ubben forced-landed behind Allied lines near Doblatan. He was rescued by a Fieseler Fi 156 Storch and flown back to his unit. No. 33 Squadron claimed four Bf 109s during the battle, though only three were brought down. Among the claimants was RAF ace Marmaduke Pattle, who claimed two Bf 109s shot down. Ubben may have been one of his victims. III. Gruppe followed the German advance and relocated to Almyros on 22 April and to Tanagra on 27 April. The conquest of Greece was completed on 30 April and JG 77, starting a brief period of rest and maintenance for JG 77.

In support of Operation Merkur, the German invasion of Crete, III. Gruppe was moved to an airfield at Molaoi on 11 May. During the battle, Ubben also carried out many ground-attack and fighter-bomber operations against Allied naval forces during mid-1941. On 22 May, Ubben and Oberleutnant Wolf-Dietrich Huy claimed hits on the Royal Navy battleship HMS Warspite. A bomb damaged her starboard 4-inch and 6-inch batteries, ripped open the ship's side and killed 38 men. The following day, JG 77 sank five Royal Navy motor torpedo boats (MTB). MTB 67, MTB 213, MTB 214, MTB 216, and MTB 217 were sunk in the Souda Bay, including one by Ubben.

=== Eastern Front ===
In preparation for Operation Barbarossa, the German invasion of the Soviet Union, III. Gruppe was moved to Bucharest and was located in the sector of Heeresgruppe Süd (Army Group South). III. Gruppe arrived in Bucharest on 16 June. Four days later, III. Gruppe moved to Roman. That evening, the pilots and ground crews were briefed of the upcoming invasion of the Soviet Union, which opened the Eastern Front. On 22 June, the first day of the invasion, Ubben claimed a Polikarpov I-16 fighter destroyed on a fighter escort mission for Heinkel He 111 bombers from III. Gruppe of Kampfgeschwader 27 (KG 27—27th Bomber Wing) attacking a Soviet airfield at Bălți. On 26 June, he claimed four Soviet bombers shot down. On 2 July in support of the German and Romanian Operation München, III. Gruppe moved to an airfield at Iași.

Ubben claimed his 21st aerial victory on 25 July. He was awarded the Knight's Cross of the Iron Cross (Ritterkreuz des Eisernen Kreuzes) in September for 32 aerial victories, 26 aircraft destroyed on the ground and some 15 armoured vehicles claimed destroyed. In September 1941, Ubben was appointed Gruppenkommandeur (group commander) of III. Gruppe of JG 77. He replaced Oberleutnant Huy who had temporarily led the Gruppe after its former commander, Major Akexander von Winterfeld, had been transferred on 2 August. Ubben was credited with his 50th aerial victory on 19 October 1941 over a Lavochkin-Gorbunov-Gudkov LaGG-3 fighter. On 9 December, he claimed four aerial victories over the Mius-Front.

On 1 February 1942, Ubben was promoted to Hauptmann (captain) and became an active officer. He was awarded the Knight's Cross of the Iron Cross with Oak Leaves (Ritterkreuz des Eisernen Kreuzes mit Eichenlaub) on 12 March 1942 for 69 victories. He was the 80th member of the German armed forces to be so honored. On 20 March, III. Gruppe was withdrawn from the Eastern Front and sent to Germany for a period of rest and replenishment. All serviceable aircraft were handed over to II. Gruppe. During this leave, Ubben was presented the Oak Leaves to his Knight's Cross on 5 April 1942 by Hitler at the Führer Headquarter Wolfsschanze in Rastenburg (now Kętrzyn in Poland). Also present at the award ceremony were the fighter pilots Hauptmann Hans Philipp who received the Swords and Oberleutnant Max-Hellmuth Ostermann who also received the Oak Leaves to the Knight's Cross. In mid-April, the Gruppe reunited again at Wien-Aspern Airfield where they received 40 factory new Bf 109 F4/R1 aircraft. On 5 May, the Gruppe began its relocation back to the Eastern Front to participate in Operation Fredericus, the Second Battle of Kharkov.

=== Mediterranean Theater and Romania ===
On 23 October 1942, the British Eighth Army launched the Second Battle of El Alamein. Preceding this attack, the Luftwaffe had already planned to replace Jagdgeschwader 27 (JG 27—27th Fighter Wing), which had been fighting in North African theater, with JG 77. In preparation for this rotation, III. Gruppe of JG 77 was moved to Munich on 19 October where it was equipped with the Bf 109 G-2/trop. On 23 and 24 October, the Gruppe moved to Bari in southern Italy. The Gruppe then relocated to Tobruk Airfield on 26 October. The following day, the Gruppe moved to an airfield at Tanyet-Harun. Ubben claimed his first aerial victory in this theater of operation on 3 November. According to Prien in 1994, Ubben claimed his 93rd aerial victory over a Hurricane fighter shot down on a fighter escort mission for Ju 87 dive bombers to El Alamein between 06:50 and 07:40. A newer source written by Prien, Stemmer, Rodeike and Bock in 2004 lists Ubben with a claim over a Curtiss P-40 Warhawk fighter shot down at 14:10 southwest of El Daba.

Ubben claimed his 100th victory on 14 January 1943. That day, he claimed two P-40 fighters shot down. He was the 33rd Luftwaffe pilot to achieve the century mark. In June, III. Gruppe moved to Chilivani on Sardinia. On 1 October, Ubben claimed a Boeing B-17 Flying Fortress shot down in the vicinity of Livorno, Italy. According to Graham, the B-17 was an aircraft from the 301st Bombardment Group, 352d Bombardment Squadron, lost in the vicinity of Lucca. That day, he was promoted to Major (major). When the Geschwaderkommodore (wing commander) of JG 77, Oberstleutnant Johannes Steinhoff, went on vacation on 3 October, Ubben temporarily was put in command of JG 77, leading the Geschwader from the command post in Albano.

In October and November, in addition to his obligations as Gruppenkommandeur, Ubben also became the acting Geschwaderkommodore of Jagdgeschwader 53 (JG 53—53rd Fighter Wing) until he handed over command to Oberstleutnant Helmut Bennemann. On 24 October, Ubben received orders to move III. Gruppe to Romania. Leaving all aircraft in Italy, the Gruppe went to Mizil the next day by train. There, it provided aerial protection over the Ploiești oilfields. In Mizil, the Gruppe was equipped with the then outdated Bf 109 G-2, newer variants were unavailable. Training flight operations began on 12 November. On 19 January 1944, General der Jagdflieger, Generalmajor Adolf Galland visited Ubben at Mizil. Galland stressed the importance of the Ploiești fields to the German war effort. He requested the pilots of III. Gruppe to sign an order stating, in case of a last resort, they would have to perform aerial ramming in defense of the oil fields.

=== Wing commander and death ===
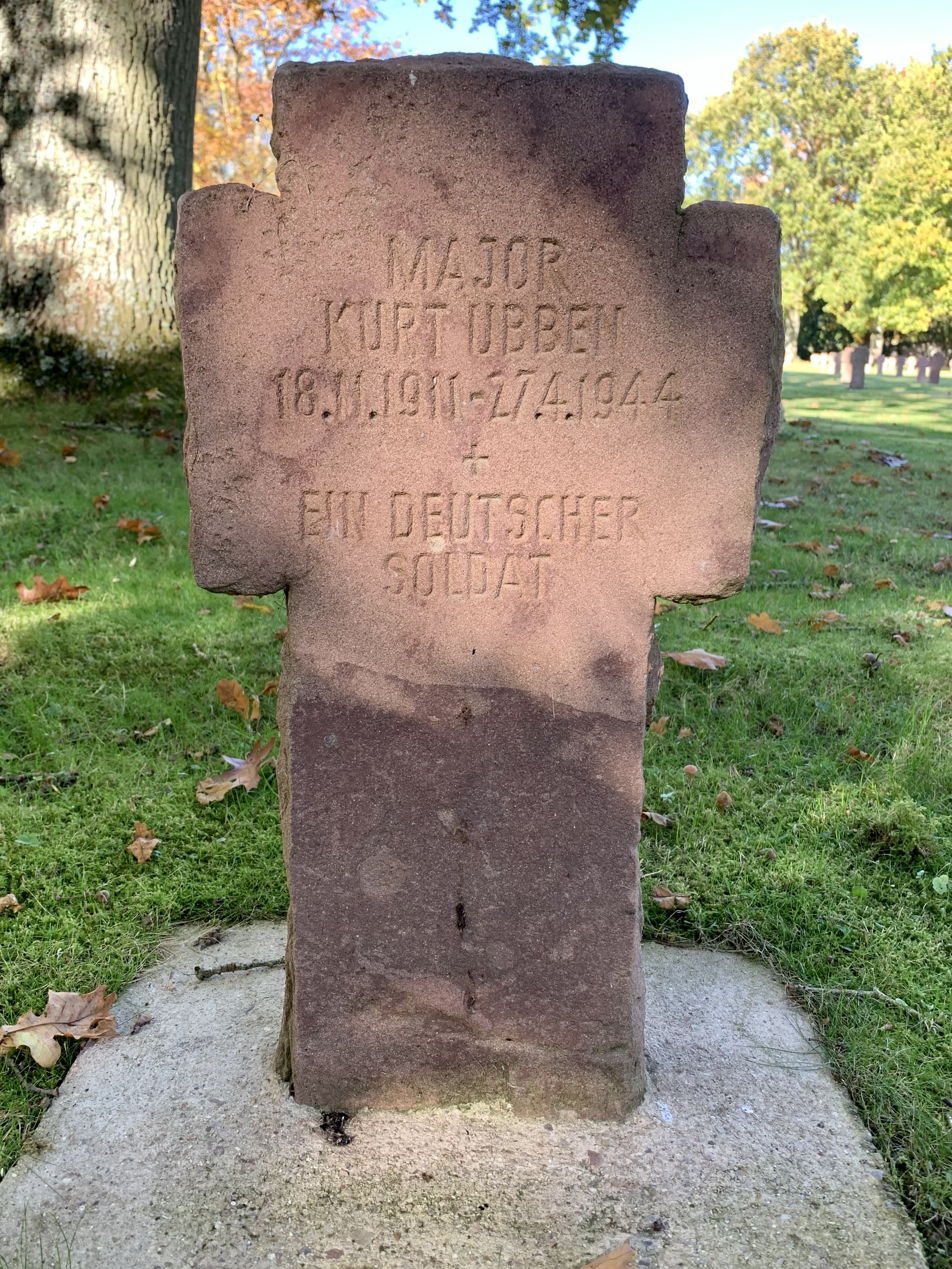
His grave at the Saint-Désir-de-Lisieux German war cemetery.

On 2 March 1944, Oberstleutnant Egon Mayer, Geschwaderkommodore of Jagdgeschwader 2 "Richthofen" (JG 2—2nd Fighter Wing) was killed in action in aerial combat with United States Army Air Forces (USAAF) fighter aircraft. In consequence, Ubben succeeded Mayer in this command position. JG 2 "Richthofen", named after World War I fighter ace Manfred von Richthofen, was based in France and was engaged in Defense of the Reich. Ubben left his former III. Gruppe on 10 March, assuming his new command in March 1944. Ubben left III. Gruppe of JG 77 on 10 March. Command of the Gruppe was handed to Hauptmann Emil Omert. Omert at the time was still with II. Gruppe of JG 77 and in consequence III. Gruppe was briefly led by Hauptmann Karl Bresoschek.

On 27 April 1944, Ubben engaged American Republic P-47 Thunderbolt fighters near Fère-en-Tardenois. In the ensuing combat, Ubben was shot down in Focke-Wulf Fw 190 A-8/R2. He bailed out but his parachute failed to open either due to insufficient altitude or because of an improperly fastened harness. Ubben is interred at the Saint-Désir-de-Lisieux German war cemetery. He was succeeded by Major Kurt Bühligen, later promoted to Oberstleutnant, as commander of JG 2.

== Summary of career ==
=== Aerial victory claims ===
According to US historian David T. Zabecki, Ubben was credited with 111 aerial victories. Spick lists Ubben with 110 aerial victories, of which 90 were claimed over the Eastern Front and further 20 over the Western Front, North Africa and Mediterranean theater, claimed in an unknown number of combat missions. Mathews and Foreman, authors of Luftwaffe Aces — Biographies and Victory Claims, researched the German Federal Archives and found documentation for 93 aerial victory claims, plus 13 further unconfirmed claims. This number includes 16 on the Western Front, including one four-engined bomber, and 77 on the Eastern Front.

Victory claims were logged to a map-reference (PQ = Planquadrat), for example "PQ 17692". The Luftwaffe grid map (Jägermeldenetz) covered all of Europe, western Russia and North Africa and was composed of rectangles measuring 15 minutes of latitude by 30 minutes of longitude, an area of about 360 square miles (930 km^{2}). These sectors were then subdivided into 36 smaller units to give a location area 3 km × 4 km (1.9 mi × 2.5 mi) in size.

Chronicle of aerial victories
This and the – (dash) indicates unconfirmed aerial victory claims for which Ubben did not receive credit. This and the ? (question mark) indicates information discrepancies listed by Prien, Stemmer, Rodeike, Bock, Mathews and Foreman. This and the ! (exclamation mark) indicates those aerial victories listed by Prien, Stemmer, Rodeike and Bock. This and the # (hash mark) indicates those aerial victories listed by Mathews and Foreman.
Claim!	Claim#	Date	Time	Type	Location	Claim!	Claim#	Date	Time	Type	Location
– 5. Staffel of Jagdggruppe 186 (Trägergruppe) – Battle of France — 10 May – 1 June 1940
1	1	10 May 1940	06:50	D.XXI	De Kooy		2	19 May 1940	05:05	Hudson	
– 8. Staffel of Jagdgeschwader 77 – Balkans and Crete — 1 April – 1 June 1941
2	3	19 April 1941	11:20	Hurricane	25 km (16 mi) north of Lamia						
– 8. Staffel of Jagdgeschwader 77 – Operation Barbarossa — 22 June – 5 December 1941
3	4	22 June 1941	18:58	I-16		—	—	27 July 1941	—	I-16	
4	5	26 June 1941	10:45	DB-3		22	23	31 July 1941	12:53	I-16	
5	6	26 June 1941	10:51	DB-3		23	24	31 July 1941	17:00	Potez 25	
6	7	26 June 1941	11:02	DB-3		24	25	5 August 1941	17:55	I-16	
7	8	26 June 1941	14:47	DB-3		25	26	5 August 1941	18:03	I-16	
8	9	4 July 1941	16:08	SB-3		26	27	11 August 1941	15:48	I-16	
9	10	4 July 1941	18:37	SB-3		27	28	13 August 1941	08:48	I-5	
10	11	8 July 1941	18:23	DB-3		28	29	17 August 1941	17:05	Seversky	
11	12	8 July 1941	18:25	DB-3		29	30	22 August 1941	11:00	I-15	PQ 17692
12	13	8 July 1941	18:27	DB-3		30	31	29 August 1941	07:05	DB-3	
13	14	10 July 1941	11:13	I-153		31	32	30 August 1941	18:45	I-153	
14	15	10 July 1941	11:16	I-153		32	33	1 September 1941	17:41	DB-3	
15	16	10 July 1941	11:18	I-153		33	34	1 September 1941	17:53	I-16	
16	17	11 July 1941	12:39	MiG-3		34	35	2 September 1941	07:40	Pe-2	
17	18	21 July 1941	12:38	I-61 (MiG-3)		35	36	4 September 1941	05:55	DB-3	
18	19	22 July 1941	12:32	I-61 (MiG-3)		36	37	5 September 1941	05:35	I-16	
19	20	25 July 1941	19:40	I-153		37	38	26 September 1941	16:00	I-153	
20	21	25 July 1941	19:43	I-153		38		29 September 1941	11:02	R-10	
21	22	27 July 1941	15:42	I-153							
– Stab III. Gruppe of Jagdgeschwader 77 – Operation Barbarossa — 22 June 1941 – 5 December 1941
—	—	1 October 1941	—	I-16	vicinity of Perekop	47		18 October 1941	—	LaGG-3	
39	39	2 October 1941	11:52	MiG-3		48	47	19 October 1941	12:52	LaGG-3	
40	40	3 October 1941	14:30	MiG-3		49	48	19 October 1941	16:12	I-15	
41	41	9 October 1941	15:08	MiG-3	vicinity of Chaplynka	50	49	20 October 1941	16:08	LaGG-3	
42	42	9 October 1941	15:14	MiG-3	vicinity of Chaplynka	51	50	22 October 1941	09:10	Il-2	
43	43	9 October 1941	15:16	MiG-3	PQ 3642 vicinity of Chaplynka	52	—	23 October 1941	—	I-15	
44	44	10 October 1941	06:15	Il-2	PQ 3784	53	51	4 November 1941	15:08	I-153	
45	45	10 October 1941	06:30	MiG-3		54	—	6 November 1941	—	MiG-3	
46	46	11 October 1941	14:05	Pe-2	PQ 3622	55	—	6 November 1941	—	Il-2	
– Stab III. Gruppe of Jagdgeschwader 77 – Eastern Front — 6 December 1941 – 20 March 1942
56	52	7 December 1941	14:10	I-15		63	59	7 January 1942	09:10	Pe-2	PQ 5667
57	53	9 December 1941	09:05	DB-3		64	—	24 February 1942	—	LaGG-3	
58	54	9 December 1941	12:30	I-15		65	60	2 March 1942	09:30	Il-2	PQ 5684
59	55	9 December 1941	12:32	I-15		66	—	5 March 1942	—	I-16	
60	56	9 December 1941	12:35	I-15		67	61	9 March 1942	12:55	I-153	
61	57	11 December 1941	13:33	SB-2		68	—	12 March 1942	—	I-153	
62	58	31 December 1941	10:42	I-153		69	62	17 March 1942	12:34	DB-3	
– Stab III. Gruppe of Jagdgeschwader 77 – Eastern Front — 1 May – 16 October 1942
70	63	12 May 1942	17:10	Il-2		78	71	6 July 1942	18:52	Yak-1	Kerch/Taman
71	64	27 May 1942	15:22	Pe-2	PQ 6083	79	72	9 July 1942	11:12	Yak-1	PQ 66561
72	65	18 June 1942	04:00	LaGG-3	PQ 35392	80	73	14 July 1942	17:28	I-16	
73	66	18 June 1942	15:08	I-153			74	22 July 1942	09:52	Yak-1	
74	67	1 July 1942	17:10	Yak-1			75	12 September 1942	14:01	Pe-2	PQ 10193; 65 km (40 mi) east-southeast of Sloboda
75	68	2 July 1942	14:44	Il-2			76	15 September 1942	07:11	LaGG-3	PQ 20101; 90 km (56 mi) east of Vorenezh
76	69	5 July 1942	17:20? (Note: According to Mathews and Foreman claimed at 17:23.)	Il-2	Kerch		77	16 September 1942	07:44	Yak-1	PQ 00254
77	70	5 July 1942	17:23	Il-2	PQ 66823						
According to Prien, Stemmer, Rodeike and Bock, Ubben claimed one additional victory in February/March, and three further victories in July/September.
89	78	21 September 1942	11:15	Pe-2	PQ 10161; 60 km (37 mi) east-southeast of Sloboda	91	80	30 September 1942	11:30	Yak-1	PQ 0026
90	79	26 September 1942	14:52	LaGG-3	PQ 00262						
– Stab III. Gruppe of Jagdgeschwader 77 – North Africa — 26 October – 31 December 1942
92	—	3 November 1942	14:10	P-40	southwest of El Daba	95	—	11 December 1942	09:40	P-40	west of Marsa al-Brega
93	—	5 November 1942	14:10? (Note: According to Mathews and Foreman claimed at 14:30.)	Hurricane	west of Fouka	96	—	13 December 1942	13:00	P-40	east of Nofaliya/Merduma
94	81	7 November 1942	16:20	Hurricane	PQ 61664	97	82	15 December 1942	10:55	P-40	PQ 03 Ost 8181
– Stab III. Gruppe of Jagdgeschwader 77 – North Africa — 1 January – May 1943
99	83	10 January 1943	11:00	P-38	west of Wadi Tamet	103	87	4 February 1943	15:10	P-38	PQ 03 Ost 85682, southwest El Guettar
100	84	14 January 1943	11:15	P-40	PQ 13 Ost 43593, southwest of Zliten	104	88	8 February 1943	12:49	P-38	PQ 03 Ost 95673, west of Skhira
101	85	14 January 1943	16:25	P-40	PQ 13 Ost 51181, south of Bir el Gheddahia	105	89	8 February 1943	13:01	P-38	PQ 03 Ost 95751, south of Sened
	86	18 January 1943	14:22	P-38	PQ 52112	106	90	15 February 1943	12:01	Spitfire	30 km (19 mi) southwest of Sidi Bouzid
102		28 January 1943	—	P-40			—	6 May 1943	10:50	P-38	10–15 km (6.2–9.3 mi) west of Cap Bon
– Stab III. Gruppe of Jagdgeschwader 77 – Italy — June – 25 October 1943
107	91	24 June 1943	09:55	P-38	PQ 04 Ost 81593, west of Bosa	109	93	1 October 1943	11:55	B-17	PQ 14 Ost 04195, vicinity of Livorno
108	92	24 June 1943	10:15	P-38	PQ 04 Ost 7039	110		21 October 1943	11:35	P-38	PQ 14 1347

=== Awards ===
- Iron Cross (1939)
  - 2nd Class (10 May 1940)
  - 1st Class (August 1940)
- German Cross in Gold on 9 December 1941 as Oberleutnant in the 8./Jagdgeschwader 77
- Knight's Cross of the Iron Cross with Oak Leaves
  - Knight's Cross on 4 September 1941 as Oberleutnant and Staffelkapitän of the 8./Jagdgeschwader 77
  - 80th Oak Leaves on 12 March 1942 as Hauptmann and Gruppenkommandeur of the III./Jagdgeschwader 77

=== Promotions ===
1 May 1940:	Leutnant (second lieutenant) with a rank age dated back to 1 October 1936
1 May 1940:	Oberleutnant (first lieutenant) of the reserves with a rank age dated back to 1 June 1939
1 February 1942:	Hauptmann (captain)
1 October 1943:	Major (major)

== Notes ==
Military offices
Preceded by Major Friedrich-Karl Müller	Acting commander of Jagdgeschwader 53 Pik As; October 1943 – November 1943	Succeeded by Oberstleutnant Helmut Bennemann
Preceded by Major Egon Mayer	Commander of Jagdgeschwader 2 Richthofen; 2 March 1944 – 27 April 1944	Succeeded by Oberstleutnant Kurt Bühligen
