= Egon Mayer =

German World War II flying ace (1917–1944)

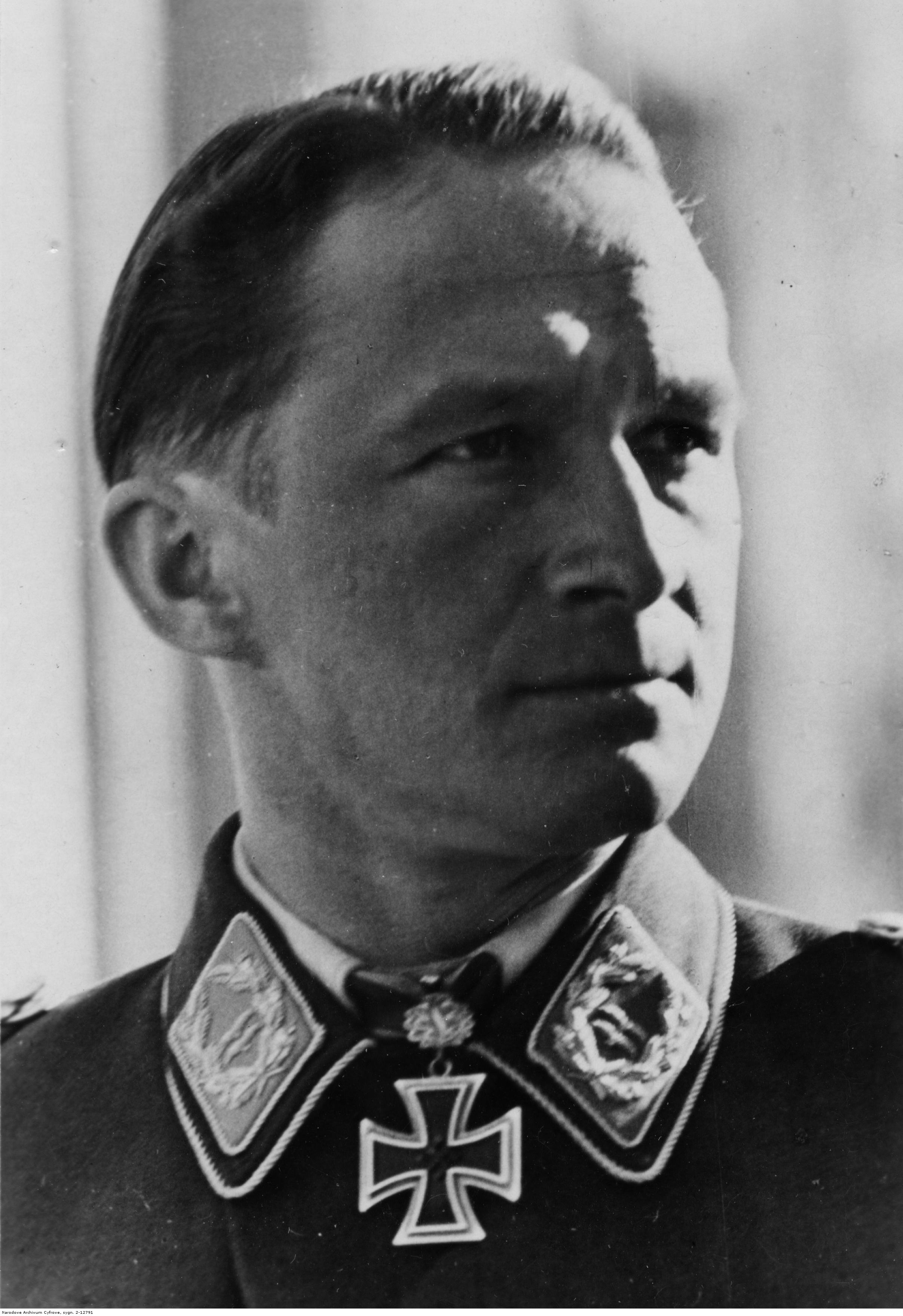
- Mayer as Oberstleutnant
- Born: 19 August 1917; Konstanz, Grand Duchy of Baden, German Empire
- Died: 2 March 1944 (aged 26) near Montmédy, German-occupied France
- Cause of death: Killed in action
- Burial place: Saint-Désir-de-Lisieux German war cemetery, Lisieux, Normandy
- Military career
- Allegiance: Nazi Germany
- Branch: Luftwaffe
- Service years: 1937–1944
- Rank: Oberstleutnant (lieutenant colonel)
- Commands: 7./JG 2, III./JG 2, JG 2
- Conflicts: See battles World War II: Battle of France; Battle of Britain; Western Front; Defense of the Reich †
- Awards: Knight's Cross of the Iron Cross with Oak Leaves and Swords

Egon Mayer (19 August 1917 – 2 March 1944) was a Luftwaffe wing commander and fighter ace of Nazi Germany during World War II. He was credited with 102 enemy aircraft shot down in over 353 combat missions. His victories were all claimed over the Western Front and included 26 four-engine bombers, 51 Supermarine Spitfires and 12 Republic P-47 Thunderbolts. Mayer was the first fighter pilot to score 100 victories entirely on the Western Front.

Born in Konstanz, Mayer, volunteered for military service in the Luftwaffe of Nazi Germany in 1937. Following flight training he was posted to Jagdgeschwader 2 "Richthofen" (JG 2—2nd Fighter Wing) in 1939. He fought in the Battle of France and claimed his first aerial victory in that campaign on 13 June 1940. Mayer was appointed squadron leader of the 7. Staffel (7th squadron) of JG 2 in June 1941. Two months later, following his 21st aerial victory, he received the Knight's Cross of the Iron Cross on 1 August 1941. He claimed 16 further victories and was awarded the German Cross in Gold on 16 July 1942. In November 1942, Mayer was appointed commander of the III. Gruppe (3rd group) of JG 2.

Mayer claimed his first victories over United States Army Air Forces (USAAF) four-engine bombers when he shot down two B-17 Flying Fortresses and a B-24 Liberator on 23 November 1942. Together with fellow fighter ace Georg-Peter Eder, Mayer developed the head-on attack as the most effective tactic against the Allied daylight heavy combat box bomber formations. He received the Knight's Cross of the Iron Cross with Oak Leaves on 16 April 1943 after 63 victories. On 1 July 1943, he replaced Walter Oesau as commander of JG 2. He claimed his 90th victory on 31 December 1943 and on 5 February 1944 became the first pilot on the Channel Front to reach 100 victories. Mayer was killed in action on 2 March 1944 while leading an attack on a USAAF bomber formation; he was shot down by P-47 Thunderbolt escort fighters near Montmédy, France. He was posthumously awarded the Knight's Cross of the Iron Cross with Oak Leaves and Swords.

== Early life and career ==
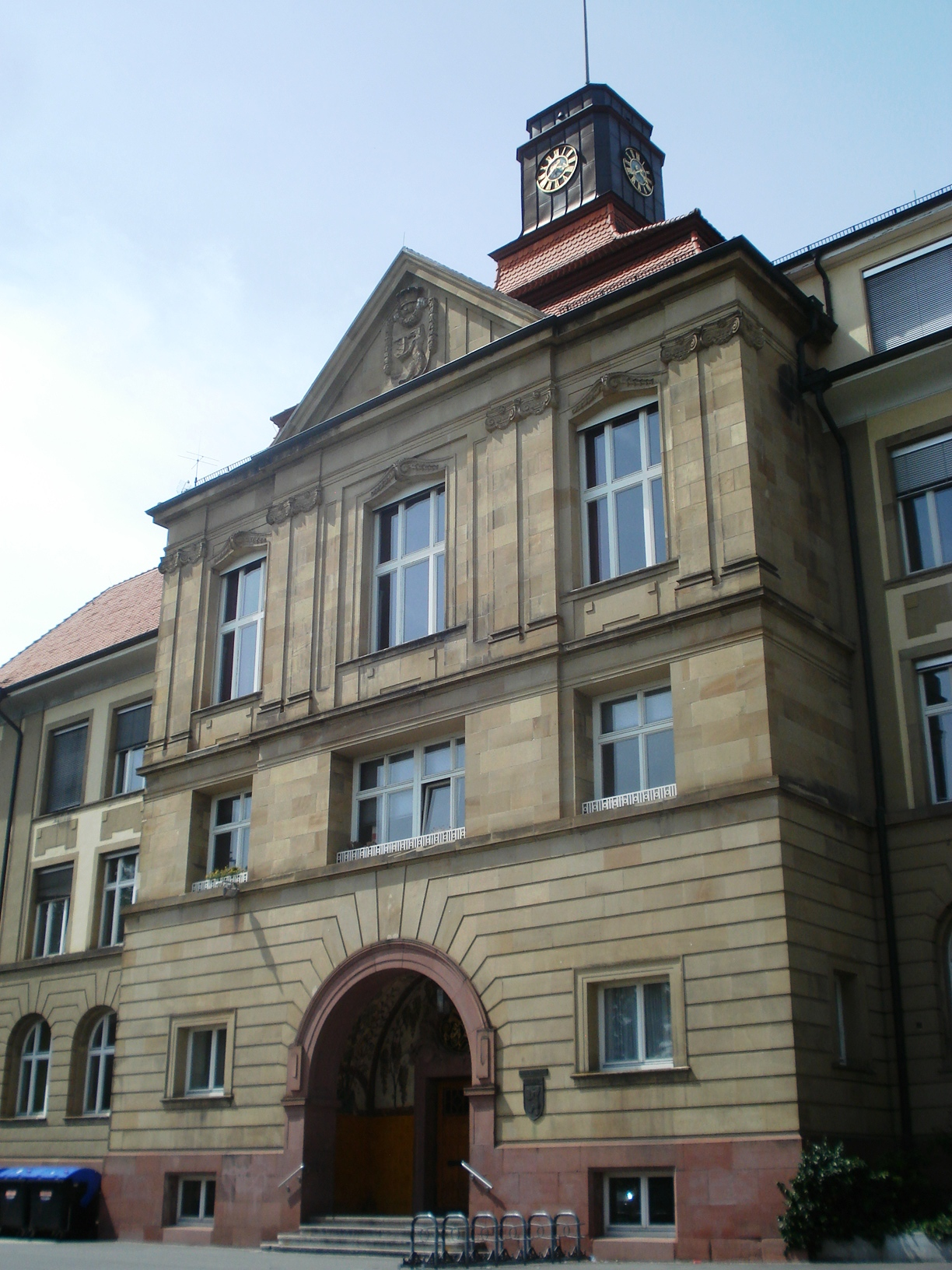
The Hegau-Gymnasium in Singen

Mayer, the son of a farmer, was born on 19 August 1917 in Konstanz at the Bodensee. Konstanz at the time was in the Grand Duchy of Baden of the German Empire. Mayer grew up on his parents' farm named Hauserhof and spent his spare time at the glider airfield at the Bellenberg near Engen. He went to school at the Langemarck-Realgymnasium—a secondary school built on the mid-level Realschule to achieve the Abitur (university entry qualification)—in Singen. Today, the Langemarck-Realgymnasium, which had been named after the location of the World War I Battle of Langemarck, is the Hegau-Gymnasium.

Following his graduation, Mayer volunteered for military service in the Luftwaffe on 1 November 1937. His military training began at the 2nd Air Warfare School (Luftkriegsschule 2) at Gatow, on the southwestern outskirts of Berlin. (Note: Flight training in the Luftwaffe progressed through the levels A1, A2 and B1, B2, referred to as A/B flight training. A training included theoretical and practical training in aerobatics, navigation, long-distance flights and dead-stick landings. The B courses included high-altitude flights, instrument flights, night landings and training to handle the aircraft in difficult situations.) He was then trained as a fighter pilot and promoted to Leutnant (second lieutenant) on 1 August 1939. His classmates at Gatow included Gerhard Barkhorn and Julius Meimberg. Mayer was selected for specialized fighter pilot training and was posted to the Jagdfliegerschule Schleißheim, the fighter pilot school at Schleißheim.

== World War II ==
World War II in Europe began on Friday, 1 September 1939, when German forces invaded Poland, the day Mayer was en route to Schleißheim. Mayer received the Iron Cross 2nd Class (Eisernes Kreuz 2. Klasse) on 25 October 1939 and was transferred to Jagdgeschwader 2 "Richthofen" (JG 2—2nd Fighter Wing), named after World War I fighter ace Manfred von Richthofen, on 6 December 1939. (Note: For an explanation of Luftwaffe unit designations see Organization of the Luftwaffe during World War II.) For his entire combat career, with the exception of a brief posting to the fighter pilot school at Werneuchen, Mayer served in JG 2 "Richthofen". He claimed his first aerial victory on 13 June 1940 during the Battle of France, shooting down a Morane-Saulnier M.S.406 belonging to the French Air Force (Armée de l'Air).

In the Battle of Britain, Mayer often flew over the English Channel as the wingman of Helmut Wick. He claimed three further victories in this campaign, all over Royal Air Force (RAF) Supermarine Spitfires, but was himself shot down or forced to land at the French coast. Once he had to swim in the Channel for an hour before he was rescued. At the end of 1940 Mayer had four victories to his credit and JG 2 "Richthofen" was withdrawn from combat to replenish the heavy losses it had sustained. Following a short tour as fighter pilot instructor at the Jagdfliegerschule (fighter pilot school) in Werneuchen, Mayer was sent back to the Channel Front.

On 9 June 1941, Oberleutnant (First Lieutenant) Mayer was appointed Staffelkapitän (squadron leader) of 7. Staffel (7th squadron) of JG 2 "Richthofen", based at an airfield near Rocquancourt, located approximately 10 kilometers (6.2 miles) south-southeast of Caen. He replaced Oberleutnant Werner Machold who had been taken prisoner of war that day. Mayer claimed his 19th and 20th victory on 23 July 1941 and was awarded the Knight's Cross of the Iron Cross (Ritterkreuz des Eisernen Kreuzes) on 1 August 1941 after his 21st aerial victory. He received the award with fellow JG 2 "Richthofen" pilots Oberleutnant Erich Leie and Oberleutnant Rudolf Pflanz on that day. The triple award presentation was recorded by the Deutsche Wochenschau (German Weekly Review), a newsreel series released in the cinemas. His score had increased to 28 aerial victories by the end of 1941.

On 12 February 1942 Mayer claimed a Westland Whirlwind during Operation Donnerkeil, the air cover plan for the Channel Dash of German warships from port in western France to Germany. Four of these uncommon aircraft were lost from No. 137 Squadron with their pilots. On 25 April 1942, Mayer claimed four RAF fighters. Fighter Command suffered high losses on this date; 15 of them have been attributed to JG 2 and Jagdgeschwader 26 "Schlageter" (JG 26—26th Fighter Wing). No. 118 Squadron lost two pilots killed in action with JG 2, and another five from No. 501 Squadron were shot down in the Cherbourg area leading to the death of four members. In May, III. Gruppe of JG 2 converted from the Messerschmitt Bf 109 F to the radial engine powered Focke-Wulf Fw 190 A.

Mayer received the German Cross in Gold (Deutsches Kreuz in Gold) on 16 July 1942. Mayer claimed a Spitfire off Selsey Bill on 31 July. Flying Officer Tadeusz Kratke, No. 317 Squadron, was wounded in the legs and parachuted to safety south of the land mark. On 19 August, his 25th birthday, Mayer shot down two Spitfires over Dieppe during the British/Canadian raid on Dieppe (Operation Jubilee), his 49th and 50th victory. 50 of RAF Fighter Command's losses were attributed to action with German fighters along with another 12 damaged. The Luftwaffe's losses were much smaller, but JG 2 and JG 26 had been worn down through losses and damaged aircraft and could not make much of an impression during the afternoon. Mayer was among the German pilots to file their claims in the later afternoon.

=== Group commander ===
Combat box of a 12-plane B-17 squadron. Three such boxes completed a 36-plane group box.: 1. Lead Element; 2. High Element; 3. Low Element; 4. Low Low Element

Mayer was promoted to Hauptmann (captain) and was appointed Gruppenkommandeur (group commander) of III. Gruppe of JG 2 "Richthofen" in November 1942. He succeeded Hauptmann Hans Hahn who had been transferred on 1 November. In consequence, command of 7. Staffel was passed to Oberleutnant Erich Hohagen. On 23 November, Mayer claimed his first victories over United States Army Air Forces (USAAF) four-engined bombers, when he shot down two B-17 Flying Fortresses and a B-24 Liberator. Together with Georg-Peter Eder, Mayer developed the head-on attack as the most effective tactic against the Allied daylight heavy combat box bomber formations. The concept was based on a Kette (chain), three aircraft flying in a "V" formation, attacking from ahead and to the left. When in range, the attackers opened fire with a deflection burst, aiming in front of the enemy aircraft. Following the attack, the pilots would pull up sharply to the left or right. This gave the attacking fighters the best chance of avoiding the massed firepower of the bombers' guns.

On 14 February 1943, Mayer claimed three RAF Hawker Typhoons, claiming his 60th to 62nd victories. Following his 63rd victory he was awarded the Knight's Cross of the Iron Cross with Oak Leaves (Ritterkreuz des Eisernen Kreuzes mit Eichenlaub) on 16 April 1943, the 232nd officer or soldier of the Wehrmacht so honored. The presentation was made by Adolf Hitler in his office at the Reich Chancellery in Berlin on 11 May 1943. Mayer was then promoted to Major (major) on 1 June 1943. Fighter Command lost no aircraft on 14 February 1943. The previous day, it did report two Typhoons lost in combat with Fw 190s from JG 2—both pilots from No. 609 Squadron were killed.

On 22 June 1943, a flight led by Mayer encountered an RAF Spitfire unit. During the course of the engagement, he claimed one Spitfire shot down and damage to another. Fighter Command lost five fighters on 22 June. Four were lost in action with Jagdgeschwader 1 (JG 1—1st Fighter Wing). The only unattributed loss came when Flying Officer J Watlington, No. 400 Squadron was shot down and captured. He was later repatriated in 1944.

=== Wing commander and death ===
Mayer was appointed Geschwaderkommodore (wing commander) of JG 2 "Richthofen" on 1 July 1943, thus succeeding Oberst (Colonel) Walter Oesau. Command of III. Gruppe was passed on to the Staffelkapitän of 8. Staffel, Hauptmann Bruno Stolle. Mayer accounted for a B-17 on 14 July. The 305th Bombardment Group formed part of an attack on the Paris area. Mayer led his wing into combat, but held position over Evreux, to stay clear of Allied fighter escorts and to await the bomber stream. The 305th bombed the target unscathed but were then attacked by two Fw 190s; one of the pilots being Mayer. Navigator Ed Burford gave a description of the attack:

Whoever it was gave a riveting display of aerobatics out in front of our entire 102nd Combat Wing before slashing in to fatally damage the leading ship of the 422nd Bombardment Squadron in the low slot. The attack took place at 08:18 near Etampes, southwest of Paris. After fires broke out between the #2 and the fuselage, and between the #3 and #4 engines, the ship nosed down in a spin - somehow seven men managed to hit the silk. I had never seen such a tremendous volume of tracer go after that one plane with a wingman in tow. Downright discouraging to hit nothing but air.

Mayer was not known for showboating, and his actions were probably a result of radio failure - an attempt to attract the attention of his pilots after finding the unescorted bombers. The claim matches exactly the time and place of the 305th Bomb Group's loss. The bomber was B-17F-1-35-DL, 42-3190, of the 322nd Bombardment Squadron.

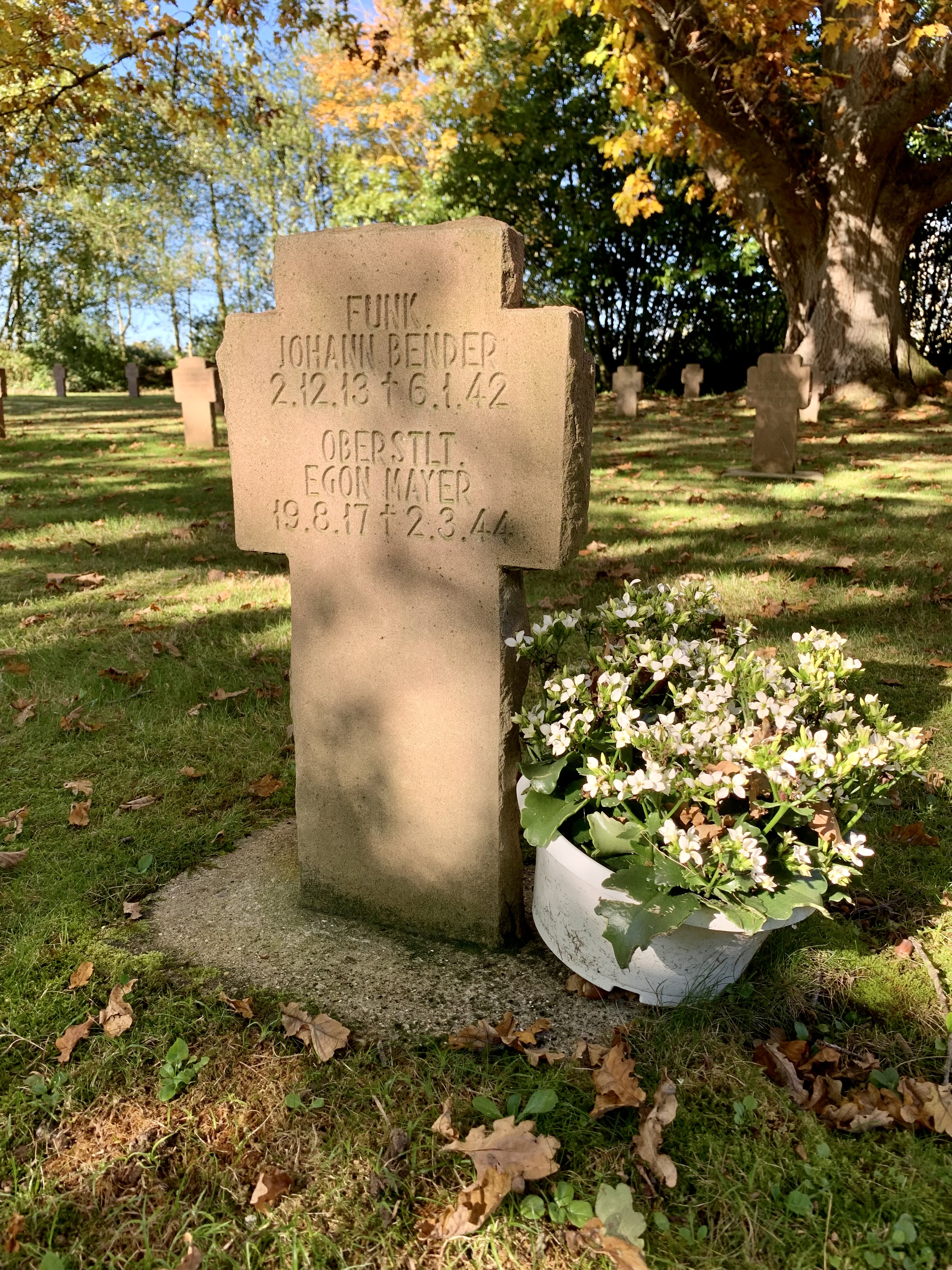
His grave at the Saint-Désir-de-Lisieux German war cemetery.

Mayer claimed two Spitfires on 22 August. JG 2 claimed six between 19:50 and 20:15. No. 66 Squadron lost one pilot killed while another evaded. No. 485 Squadron lost four; one pilot was killed, two captured and one evaded capture to return to Britain. He claimed three B-17s shot down within 19 minutes on 6 September. The Eighth Air Force was targeting Stuttgart that day and lost 45 aircraft. Mayer accounted for two Spitfires on 22 September near Evreux. Two No. 308 Polish Fighter Squadron pilots were shot down in the area; one was killed the other escaped capture. On 1 December 1943, Mayer shot down three Republic P-47 Thunderbolt fighters. His claimed aerial victories increased to 90 on 30 December 1943. Mayer was credited with four victories on 7 January 1944, three B-24s and one B-17 shot down in the vicinity of Orléans. On 4 February 1944 he claimed a P-47 from the US 56th Fighter Group, the only American fighter lost by the 8th Fighter Command on this date. It was Mayer's 100th victory, and he became the first fighter pilot on the Channel Front to achieve this mark.

Mayer's final score stood at 102 when he was shot down and killed in action by a P-47 Thunderbolt near Montmédy on 2 March 1944. Flying Fw 190 A-6 (Werknummer 470468—factory number), Mayer had led his Stabsschwarm (headquarters unit) and elements of III. Gruppe, 14 Fw 190s in total, in an attack on B-17s in the area of Sedan, but failed to detect the fighter escort of 29 P-47s 5,000 ft (1,500 m) above. His aircraft was seen taking hits at a range of 400 yd (370 m) in the nose and cockpit. It made a violent snap roll and went into a vertical dive, crashing within 2.5 mi (4.0 km) of Montmédy. He was posthumously decorated with the Knight's Cross of the Iron Cross with Oak Leaves and Swords (Ritterkreuz des Eisernen Kreuzes mit Eichenlaub und Schwertern) that day. On 10 March, command of JG 2 was passed to Major Kurt Ubben.

Recent research by historian Norman Fortier suggests that Mayer was shot down by Lieutenant Walter Gresham of the 358th Fighter Squadron of the 355th Fighter Wing. The claim is based on gun camera footage and recollections of Mayer's wingman, who was forced to bail out during the action. Mayer was buried at the cemetery of Beaumont-le-Roger, France, and in 1955 re-interred at Saint-Désir-de-Lisieux German war cemetery near Lisieux, Normandy, France.

== Alleged encounter with Robert S. Johnson ==
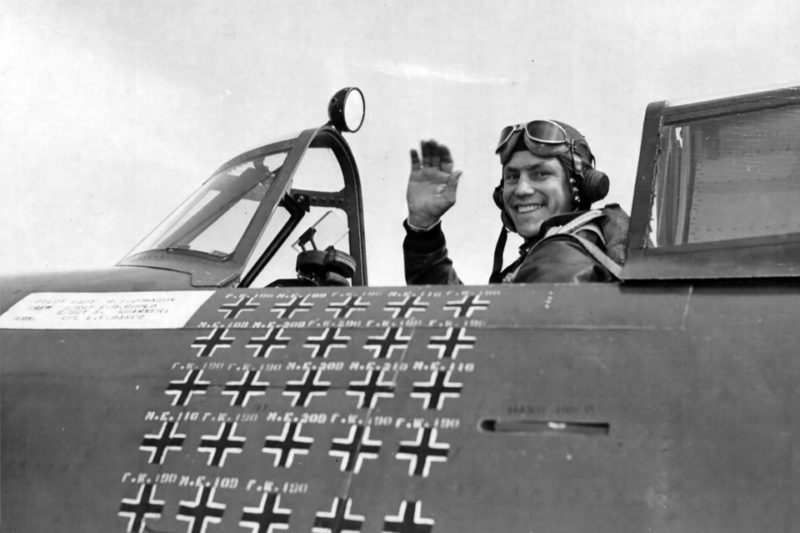
Robert S. Johnson in his Republic P-47 Thunderbolt.

In June 1943, Mayer had allegedly encountered Robert S. Johnson, a future ace from the 56th Fighter Group of the USAAF VIII Bomber Command. On 26 June, a German Fw 190 formation from II. Group of JG 26, led by Hauptmann Wilhelm-Ferdinand Galland, engaged the 56th Fighter Group near Forges-les-Eaux and claimed ten P-47s shot down. The P-47C Thunderbolt of Johnson, was damaged by the German pilots. As he returned home with a jammed canopy, a German pilot circled behind him to give him the coup de grâce. Johnson recounts in his memoir three gun passes failing to knock his plane out of the sky, before the German pilot ran out of ammunition, pulled alongside, saluted him, and headed home. Johnson landed safely, but with over 200 holes in his aircraft and damage from a 20 mm canon shell that made it impossible to open the canopy.

Gerald W. Johnson, also from the 56th Fighter Group, recounted in his memoir seeing two Fw 190s chasing Robert Johnson's aircraft. He said he shot down the attacking plane, but was not able to locate the second aircraft. After landing, he says he kept quiet to avoid "spoiling Robert's glory". Some sources believe Mayer was the German pilot chasing Robert Johnson's aircraft, and may have shot down as many as three Thunderbolt aircraft in the battle. In The Mighty Eighth, Freeman's account states that Mayer made a propaganda radio broadcast that night in which he identified one of his victims bearing the markings HV:P, those of Johnson. However, other authors have expressed doubt about Mayer's involvement. There is no direct evidence Mayer was involved in this battle, and neither Mayer nor any other III./JG 2 pilot is present in the day's victory or loss records according to the most complete German sources. Mayer's III. Gruppe was based in Brittany, France, at the time. Mayer had surrendered command of III. Gruppe of JG 2 to Hauptmann Bruno Stolle on 25 June and officially took command of JG 2 as Geschwaderkommodore on 1 July. However, unofficially he already led the Geschwader on 26 June. Mayer did not file claim for any aerial victories on 26 June, not with the Geschwaderstab nor with III. Gruppe.

== Summary of career ==
=== Aerial victory claims ===
According to US historian David T. Zabecki, Mayer was credited with 102 aerial victories. Spick also lists him with 102 aerial victories claimed in 353 combat missions, and a mission-to-claim ratio of 3.46. Mathews and Foreman, authors of Luftwaffe Aces — Biographies and Victory Claims, researched the German Federal Archives and found records for 102 aerial victory claims, plus five further unconfirmed claims. All of his victories were claimed on the Western Front and include 27 four-engined bombers.

Victory claims were logged to a map-reference (PQ = Planquadrat), for example "PQ 14 West 3853". The Luftwaffe grid map (Jägermeldenetz) covered all of Europe, western Russia and North Africa and was composed of rectangles measuring 15 minutes of latitude by 30 minutes of longitude, an area of about 360 square miles (930 km^{2}). These sectors were then subdivided into 36 smaller units to give a location area 3 km × 4 km (1.9 mi × 2.5 mi) in size.

Chronicle of aerial victories
This and the ♠ (Ace of spades) indicates those aerial victories which made Mayer an "ace-in-a-day", a term which designates a fighter pilot who has shot down five or more airplanes in a single day. This and the – (dash) indicates unconfirmed aerial victory claims for which Mayer did not receive credit. This along with the * (asterisk) indicates an Herausschuss (separation shot)—a severely damaged heavy bomber forced to separate from his combat box which was counted as an aerial victory. This and the ? (question mark) indicates information discrepancies listed by Prien, Stemmer, Rodeike, Bock, Mathews and Foreman.
Claim	Date	Time	Type	Location	Claim	Date	Time	Type	Location
– 6. Staffel of Jagdgeschwader 2 "Richthofen" – Battle of France — 10 May – 25 June 1940
1	13 June 1940	18:00	M.S.406						
– 3. Staffel of Jagdgeschwader 2 "Richthofen" – At the Channel and over England — 26 June 1940 – 21 June 1941
2? (Note: According to Mathews and Foreman, this claim was with III. Gruppe.)	7 October 1940	17:00	Hurricane	northwest of Portland					
– 8. Staffel of Jagdgeschwader 2 "Richthofen" – At the Channel and over England — 26 June 1940 – 21 June 1941
3? (Note: According to Mathews and Foreman, this claim was with 7. Staffel.)	15 November 1940	17:10	Hurricane	Chichester					
– 7. Staffel of Jagdgeschwader 2 "Richthofen" – At the Channel and over England — 26 June 1940 – 21 June 1941
4	17 June 1941	17:50	Spitfire	north of Cherbourg					
– 7. Staffel of Jagdgeschwader 2 "Richthofen" – On the Western Front — 22 June 1941 – 31 December 1941
—	23 June 1941	—	Spitfire		16	21 July 1941	08:52	Spitfire	
—	23 June 1941	—	Spitfire		17	23 July 1941	13:14	Spitfire	Forest of Éperlecques
5	24 June 1941	20:42	Spitfire	Gravelines/Ramsgate	18	23 July 1941	13:20	Spitfire	Forest of Éperlecques
6	25 June 1941	16:33	Spitfire	Saint-Omer/Boulogne	19	21 August 1941	10:20	Spitfire	
7	2 July 1941	12:38	Blenheim		20	21 August 1941	14:50? (Note: According to Mathews and Foreman claimed at 14:30.)	Spitfire	
8	2 July 1941	13:55? (Note: According to Mathews and Foreman claimed at 18:36.)	Spitfire		21	27 August 1941	09:30	Hurricane	northwest of Le Touquet
9	3 July 1941	11:46	Spitfire		22	16 September 1941	19:32	Spitfire	vicinity of Boulogne
10	3 July 1941	15:36	Spitfire		23	16 September 1941	19:40	Spitfire	
11	5 July 1941	12:36? (Note: According to Mathews and Foreman claimed at 13:38.)	Spitfire		24	20 September 1941	16:32	Spitfire	
12	9 July 1941	14:05	Spitfire		25	2 October 1941	15:14	Spitfire	Pas-de-Calais
13	10 July 1941	12:08	Spitfire		26	13 October 1941	15:34	Spitfire	over sea, vicinity of Boulogne
14	12 July 1941	19:26	Spitfire		27	21 October 1941	13:00	Spitfire	
15	12 July 1941	19:28	Spitfire		28	21 October 1941	16:10	Spitfire	
– 7. Staffel of Jagdgeschwader 2 "Richthofen" – On the Western Front — 1 January – 31 December 1942
29	12 February 1942	14:38	Whirlwind	north of Ostend	40	4 May 1942	10:39	Spitfire	
30	15 April 1942	16:20? (Note: According to Mathews and Foreman claimed at 16:29.)	Spitfire		41	4 May 1942	15:48	Spitfire	
—	15 April 1942	—	Spitfire		42	6 May 1942	12:29	Spitfire	
31	16 April 1942	15:30	Spitfire		43	3 June 1942	15:35	Spitfire	vicinity of Cherbourg
32	16 April 1942	15:33	Spitfire		44	3 June 1942	15:40	Spitfire	vicinity of Cherbourg
33	17 April 1942	09:35	Spitfire		45	6 June 1942	17:22	Spitfire	Cherbourg/Cap Lévi
—	17 April 1942	—	Spitfire		46	6 June 1942	17:22	Spitfire	Cherbourg/Cap Lévi
—	17 April 1942	—	Spitfire		47	23 June 1942	19:30	Spitfire	off Start Point
34	17 April 1942	16:05	Boston	vicinity of Cherbourg	48	23 June 1942	19:32	Spitfire	off Start Point
35	25 April 1942	09:45	Spitfire		49	31 July 1942	18:09	Spitfire	south of Selsey Bill
36	25 April 1942	16:17	Spitfire		50	18 August 1942	11:28	Spitfire	20 km (12 mi) northeast of Cherbourg
37	25 April 1942	16:25	Spitfire		51	19 August 1942	16:03	Hurricane	3 km (1.9 mi) north of Dieppe
38	25 April 1942	16:29	Spitfire		52	19 August 1942	16:05	Spitfire	5 km (3.1 mi) north of Dieppe
39	30 April 1942	11:43	Spitfire						
– Stab III. Gruppe of Jagdgeschwader 2 "Richthofen" – On the Western Front — 1 January – 31 December 1942
53	23 November 1942	13:25	B-17	PQ 14 West 3853	55	23 November 1942	14:00	B-24	PQ 14 West 4855
54	23 November 1942	13:34	B-17	west of Loire estuary	56	30 December 1942	11:42	B-17	Île de Groix
– Stab III. Gruppe of Jagdgeschwader 2 "Richthofen" – On the Western Front — 1 January – 31 December 1943
57	3 January 1943	11:32	B-17*	4 km (2.5 mi) southwest of Saint-Nazaire	62	14 February 1943	12:12	Typhoon	15 km (9.3 mi) northwest of Calais; PQ 05 Ost 1288
58	3 January 1943	11:35	B-17	10 km (6.2 mi) south of Saint-Nazaire; 5 km (3.1 mi) west of Loire estuary	63	16 April 1943	14:05	B-17	PQ 14 West 48346; PQ 14 West 4829
59	11 February 1943	12:10	Spitfire	18 km (11 mi) northwest of Boulogne	64? (Note: This claim is not listed by Prien, Stemmer, Rodeike and Bock.)	16 April 1943	14:22	B-17	PQ 14 West 4834
60	14 February 1943	11:36	Typhoon	30 km (19 mi) northwest of Calais; PQ 05 Ost 1287	65	29 May 1943	16:35	B-17	PQ 14 West 2938; PQ 14 West 2928
61	14 February 1943	11:40	Typhoon	20 km (12 mi) east of Dover; PQ 05 Ost 1284	66	29 May 1943	17:35	B-17	PQ 14 West 3072; PQ 14 West 3871
– Stab of Jagdgeschwader 2 "Richthofen" – On the Western Front — 1 January – 31 December 1943
67	4 July 1943	12:36	B-17	PQ 04 Ost 1965	80	6 September 1943	12:29	B-17	Lens
68	4 July 1943	12:58	B-17	PQ 15 West 1065	81	22 September 1943	17:17	Spitfire	east of Lisieux east of Évreux
69	14 July 1943	07:43	B-17	10 km (6.2 mi) north of Évreux	82	22 September 1943	17:20	Spitfire	east of Lisieux north of Évreux
70	14 July 1943	08:24	B-17	Les Essarts-le-Roi, southwest of Paris	— (Note: This claim is not listed by Mathews and Foreman.)	25 October 1943	—	B-25	northwest of Brest
71	30 July 1943	10:30	B-17	PQ 05 Ost 0422	—	25 October 1943	—	B-25	northwest of Brest
72	16 August 1943	10:37	P-47	Senneville-sur-Fécamp	83	5 November 1943	13:39	P-47	Rheydt
73	22 August 1943	19:56	Spitfire	PQ 05 Ost 0028, Cany-Barville	84	5 November 1943	13:51	P-47	PQ 05 Ost NL-5; Alken south of Hasselt
74	22 August 1943	20:10	Spitfire	Pont-Authou, southeast of Pont-Audemer	85♠	1 December 1943	12:50	P-47	PQ 05 Ost NL/ML; Gembloux-Huy
75	27 August 1943	09:45	Spitfire	Tancarville	86♠	1 December 1943	12:51? (Note: According to Mathews and Foreman claimed at 12:50.)	P-47	PQ 05 Ost NL/ML vicinity of Liège
76	3 September 1943	10:40	B-17	La Gaillarde; Bailleul	87♠	1 December 1943	12:53	P-47	PQ 05 Ost NL/MK vicinity of Gembloux
77	3 September 1943	11:25	B-17	PQ 14 West 2935; Bailleul	88♠ (Note: This claim is not listed by Prien, Stemmer, Rodeike and Bock.)	1 December 1943	12:53	P-47	vicinity of Leuven
78	6 September 1943	12:10	B-17	3 km (1.9 mi) west of Mailly-le-Camp	89♠	1 December 1943	13:10	B-17	PQ 05 Ost KH; Scheldt, Zierikzee
79	6 September 1943	12:17	B-17	7 km (4.3 mi) west of Troyes	90	31 December 1943	12:18	B-24	PQ 14 West AE-9 south of Albi
– Stab of Jagdgeschwader 2 "Richthofen" – On the Western Front — 1 January – 2 March 1944
91	4 January 1944	16:02	B-26	PQ 05 Ost S/QB-2, off Dieppe	97	7 January 1944	13:15	B-24	Bouville
92	4 January 1944	16:05	Spitfire	PQ 05 Ost S/QB-5, off Dieppe	98	7 January 1944	13:18	B-17	Les Plessys; Les Buissons, Dreux
93	5 January 1944	10:55	P-47	northwest of Laval	99	14 January 1944	15:32	P-38	La Haye-le-Comte
94	5 January 1944	10:55	P-47	PQ 14 West DS-3; Marennes	100	5 February 1944	12:49	P-47	PQ 05 Ost SD-7; Argueil, south of Forges-les-Eaux
95	7 January 1944	13:05	B-24	PQ 04 Ost N/DE-7 northeast of Orléans	101	6 February 1944	11:12	P-47	PQ 04 Ost N/CG-9
96	7 January 1944	13:06	B-24	northeast of Orléans	102	6 February 1944	11:14	P-47	PQ 04 Ost N/CG-9

=== Awards ===
- Wound Badge in Silver
- Front Flying Clasp of the Luftwaffe for Fighter Pilots in Gold with Pennant "300"
- Combined Pilots-Observation Badge
- Iron Cross (1939)
  - 2nd Class (25 October 1939)
  - 1st Class (May 1940)
- German Cross in Gold on 16 July 1942 as Oberleutnant in the 7./Jagdgeschwader 2 "Richthofen"
- Knight's Cross of the Iron Cross with Oak Leaves and Swords
  - Knight's Cross on 1 August 1941 as Leutnant of the Reserves and pilot in Jagdgeschwader 2 "Richthofen" (Note: According to Scherzer as Leutnant and pilot in the III./Jagdgeschwader 2 "Richthofen".)
  - 232nd Oak Leaves on 16 April 1943 as Hauptmann and Gruppenkommandeur of the III./Jagdgeschwader 2 "Richthofen"
  - 51st Swords on 2 March 1944 as Oberstleutnant and Geschwaderkommodore of Jagdgeschwader 2 "Richthofen"

== Notes ==
Military offices
Preceded by Major Walter Oesau	Commander of Jagdgeschwader 2 Richthofen; 1 July 1943 – 2 March 1944	Succeeded by Major Kurt Ubben
