= Horst Hannig =

German World War II flying ace

- Hannig, on account of the Knight's Cross presentation
- Born: 13 November 1921; Frankenstein, Lower Silesia, Poland
- Died: 15 May 1943 (aged 21) near Rocquancourt, Normandy, German-occupied France
- Cause of death: Killed in action
- Burial place: Saint-Désir-de-Lisieux German war cemetery, Lisieux, Normandy
- Military career
- Allegiance: Nazi Germany
- Branch: Luftwaffe
- Service years: 1939–1943
- Rank: Oberleutnant (posthumously)
- Units: JG 54, JG 2 "Richthofen"
- Commands: 5./JG 54, 2./JG 2
- Conflicts: World War II
- Awards: Knight's Cross of the Iron Cross with Oak Leaves

Horst Hannig (13 November 1921 – 15 May 1943) was a German Luftwaffe fighter ace and posthumous recipient of the Knight's Cross of the Iron Cross with Oak Leaves during World War II. The Knight's Cross of the Iron Cross, and its variants were the highest awards in the military and paramilitary forces of Nazi Germany during World War II. A flying ace or fighter ace is a military aviator credited with shooting down five or more enemy aircraft during aerial combat. Hannig is credited with 98 aerial victories claimed in over 350 combat missions. He was killed in action following combat with Royal Air Force (RAF) Supermarine Spitfire fighters on 15 May 1943.

== Early life and career ==
Hannig was born on 13 November 1921 in Frankenstein, present-day Ząbkowice Śląskie, at the time in Lower Silesia. He was the son of a secretary of justice (Justizsekretär). After he graduated with his Abitur (diploma), Hannig joined the military service in the Luftwaffe as a Fahnenjunker (officer cadet) in October 1939. Hannig had a brother Walter who received the German Cross in Gold (Deutsches Kreuz in Gold) on 28 April 1943 as an observer with Aufklärungsgruppe (reconnaissance group) 4.(F)/14 of the Luftwaffe.

Following flight training, (Note: Flight training in the Luftwaffe progressed through the levels A1, A2 and B1, B2, referred to as A/B flight training. A training included theoretical and practical training in aerobatics, navigation, long-distance flights and dead-stick landings. The B courses included high-altitude flights, instrument flights, night landings and training to handle the aircraft in difficult situations.) he was posted to the 6. Staffel (6th squadron) of Jagdgeschwader 54 "Grünherz" (JG 54—54th fighter wing) in early 1941. At the time, 6. Staffel was commanded by Oberleutnant Franz Eckerle while II. Gruppe (2nd group), to which the Staffel was subordinated, was headed by Hauptmann Dietrich Hrabak.

== World War II ==
The German invasion of Poland had begun on 1 September 1939, and marked the beginning of World War II in Europe. In April 1941, II. Gruppe of JG 54 had fought in the invasion of Yugoslavia. Following the surrender of the Royal Yugoslav Army on 17 April 1941, while stationed at an airfield at Zemun near Belgrade, the Geschwader received orders on 3 May 1941 to turn over all Bf 109-Es so they could receive the new Bf 109-F variant. Transition training was completed at Airfield Stolp-Reitz in Pomerania. Following intensive training, the Geschwader was moved to airfields in Eastern Prussia.

=== Operation Barbarossa ===
II. Gruppe under command of Hrabak was moved to Trakehnen on 20 June 1941. The Wehrmacht launched Operation Barbarossa, the invasion of the Soviet Union, on 22 June with II. Gruppe supporting Army Group North in its strategic goal towards Leningrad. On the first day of the invasion, II. Gruppe flew multiple missions in support of German bombers attacking Soviet airfields near Kowno, present-day Kaunas. That day, Hannig claimed his first aerial victory, a Tupolev SB-2 bomber. On 25 June, the Gruppe followed the German advance and relocated to an airfield at Kowno. Two days later they moved to Dünaburg, present-day Daugavpils, where Hannig claimed an Ilyushin DB-3 bomber shot down. On 28 June, the 8th Panzer Division had established a bridgehead across the Daugava. Operating from Dünaburg over the bridgehead, Hannig claimed a SB-2 bomber shot down on 30 June, three SB-3 bombers on 2 July, and another SB-2 bomber on 6 July. The following day, III. Gruppe moved to Ostrov. On 17 July, for seven aerial victories to date, he was awarded the Iron Cross 2nd Class (Eisernes Kreuz zweiter Klasse). That day, the Gruppe moved to an airfield named Sarudinje located near Pleskov, present-day Pskov, southeast of Lake Peipus. Here, Hannig claimed an I-18 fighter, an early German designation for a Mikoyan-Gurevich MiG-1 fighter, on 19 July and a DB-3 bomber on 25 July.

On 25 July, II. Gruppe moved to a makeshift airfield named Mal. Owsischtschi located near Lake Ozero Samro (58°58′18″N 28°46′16″E) east of Lake Peipus where they remained until 7 September. Here, the Gruppe supported German forces in the attack on Leningrad. In August, II. Gruppe flew missions to Leningrad and over the coastal area west of Leningrad. Here, Hannig claimed an Polikarpov I-16 fighter and I-18 fighter on 12 August, another I-16 fighter the following day, an SB-2 bomber on 14 August, two I-18 fighters on 18 August, another I-16 fighter the next day, and a Polikarpov I-15 fighter on 5 September. On 7 September, the Gruppe relocated to Torrossowa, an airfield closer to Leningrad. In September, Hannig was awarded the Iron Cross 1st Class (Eisernes Kreuz erster Klasse) and the Honor Goblet of the Luftwaffe (Ehrenpokal der Luftwaffe) on 15 September. Flying from Torrossowa, he was credited with nine I-18 fighters shot down, two on 11 September, one on 12, 14, 16 and 19 September each, two further on 23 September. On 26 September he claimed an I-16 fighter before the Gruppe moved to Staraya Russa south of Lake Ilmen on 27 September. Here, Hannig claimed two I-18 fighters, one on 2 and 5 October each, and a SB-3 bomber on 14 October, taking his total to 30 aerial victories. In early November, the Gruppe was withdrawn from the Eastern Front for a period of rest and replenishment where they were based at airfields in Döberitz, and later at Uetersen. On 24 November, Hannig was awarded the German Cross in Gold (Deutsches Kreuz in Gold).

=== Eastern Front ===
On 20 January 1942, the Gruppe began relocating to the Eastern Front where they would be based at Siverskaya near Leningrad. Flying missions over the Volkhov, Hannig claimed his first aerial victory in 1942 over an I-18 fighter on 5 February. Operating from Siverskaya during the Battle of Lyuban, Hannig claimed five further aerial victories. On 14 February, he shot down a Polikarpov R-5 reconnaissance bomber followed by another R-5 aircraft three days later. He then claimed a Petlyakov Pe-2 bomber on 23 February. Hannig then claimed a Lend-Lease Curtiss P-40 Warhawk fighter on 5 March followed by an I-18 fighter on 15 March.

On 20 March, II. Gruppe moved to Rjelbitzi Airfield, located 26 kilometers (16 miles) north of Dno and 15 kilometers (9.3 miles) west-southwest of Soltsy on the northern bank of the Shelon. Here, the Gruppe supported German forces fighting in the Demyansk Pocket and Kholm Pocket. In late March and April 1942, Hannig claimed further twelve aerial victories, increasing his total to 48 aerial victories claimed. Here on 7 May, Hannig claimed a Yakovlev Yak-1 fighter shot down. On 9 May 1942, Leutnant (second Lieutenant) Hannig was awarded the Knight's Cross of the Iron Cross (Ritterkreuz des Eisernen Kreuzes) having flown over 200 operations and claiming 48 victories. He and Leutnant Hans Beißwenger received the Knight's Cross from General der Flieger Helmuth Förster at Siverskaya. Following the Knight's Cross presentation, Hannig claimed his next aerial victory on 11 May when he shot down a Mikoyan-Gurevich MiG-3 fighter in the Demyansk combat area. He then shot down two Lavochkin-Gorbunov-Gudkov LaGG-3 fighters, one on 15 and 18 May each.

In July 1942, II. Gruppe was re-equipped with the Bf 109 G-2. Hannig then claimed a Yak-1 fighter shot down near Zaluchye located approximately 40 kilometers (25 miles) west of Demyansk on 7 July. On 24 July, he claimed his 54th victory, an Ilyushin Il-2 ground-attack aircraft near Lychkovo located southeast of Lake Ilmen. (Note: According to Bergström, Dikov, Antipov and Sundin, Hannig claimed his 54th aerial victory on 21 July over a Petlyakov Pe-2 reconnaissance aircraft, near Lake Ilmen. Which according to the authors was JG 54s 2,500th aerial victory to date. According to Prien, Stemmer, Rodeike and Bock, neither Hannig nor any other pilot of II. Gruppe of JG 54 claimed any aerial victories on 21 July 1942.) On 12 August, 5. Staffel was detached from II. Gruppe and sent to Oryol where they were based at an airfield named Oryol-West. On 31 August, II. Gruppe was again united at Rjelbitzi where the Gruppe came under control of Luftflotte 1 (Air Fleet 1). On the morning of 2 September, Hannig and Unteroffizier Walter Heck claimed two Yak-1 fighters shot down, one each. The a Yak-1 fighters belonged to the 21 IAP Fighter Regiment. (Note: IAP—Istrebitelny Aviatsionny Polk (Fighter Aviation Regiment—Истребительный Авиационный Полк)) The pilots, Starshiy Leytenant Rubtsov survived the encounter with injuries while Serzhant Levinskiy was killed in action.

On 7 October, Hauptmann Joachim Wandel, the commander of 5. Staffel was killed in action. In consequence, Hannig succeeded Wandel as Staffelkapitän (squadron leader) of 5. Staffel the following day. In early November, the Gruppe fought in the combat area north of Demyansk. Here, Hannig claimed his last aerial victories on the Eastern Front on 5 November. Taking his total to 90 aerial victories claimed, he was credited with destroying four LaGG-3 fighters that day. Three of which on one mission. On 28 September in aerial combat, Hannig flew his Bf 109 G-2 (Werknummer 10366—factory number) into the ground near Andronovo. Hannig was then transferred to the Western Front and command of 5. Staffel was passed on to Hauptmann Paul Steindl.

=== Western Front and death ===
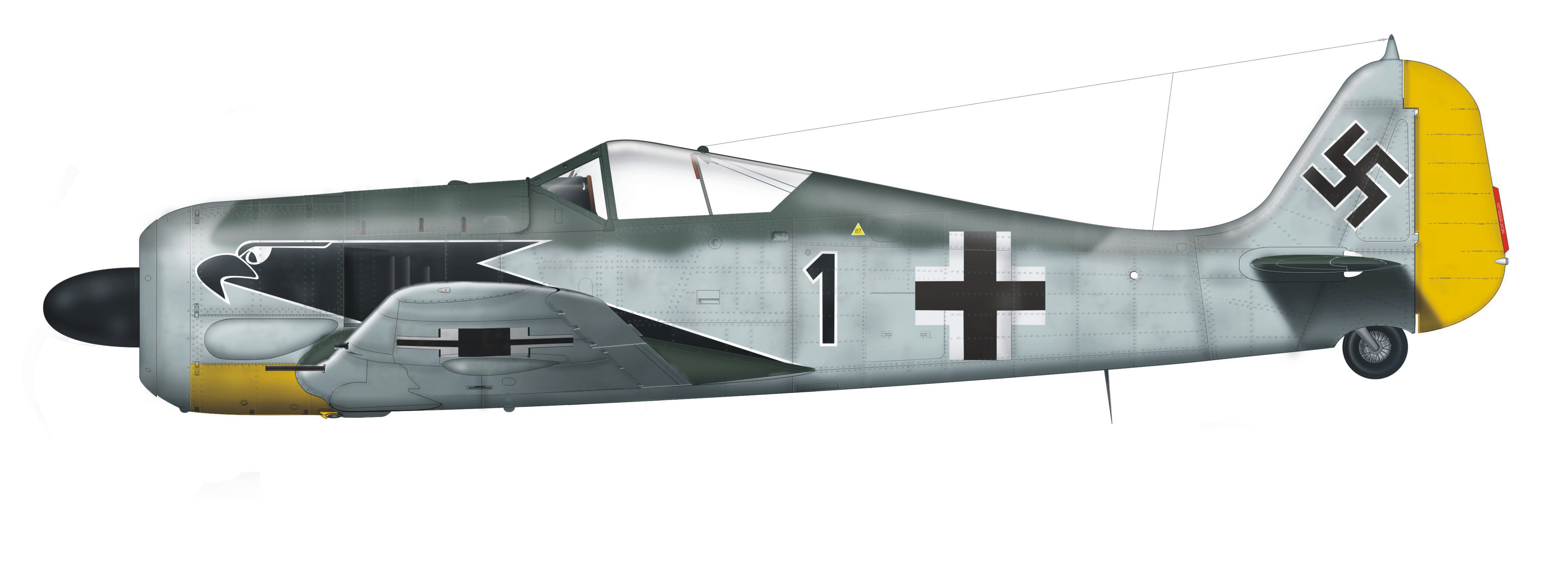
Focke Wulf Fw 190 A-4 of I./JG 2, flown by Leutnant Hannig, early 1943

On 27 January 1943, Hannig was appointed Staffelkapitän of 2. Staffel of Jagdgeschwader 2 "Richthofen" (JG 2—2nd fighter fing) based in France. He replaced Oberleutnant Christian Eickhoff who had been killed in action the day before. The Staffel was subordinated to I. Gruppe of JG 2 headed by Major Helmut-Felix Bolz. While serving with 2. Staffel of JG 2, he claimed further eight aerial victories, including one four-engine United States Army Air Forces (USAAF) heavy bomber. On 16 February, the USAAF VIII Bomber Command attacked Saint-Nazaire. I. Gruppe claimed the destruction of five Boeing B-17 Flying Fortress bombers, including one shot down by Hannig northeast of Lannion. On 28 March, bombers of VIII Bomber Command escorted by Supermarine Spitfire fighters headed for Rouen. I. Gruppe claimed six aerial victories, including a Spitfire claimed by Hannig northwest of Fécamp. VIII Bomber Command targeted Antwerp on 4 April. Fighting this attack force, Hannig was credited with the destruction of a Spitfire shot down northeast of Cherbourg. On 13 April, he claimed two further Spitfires shot down southwest of Caen. Two days later he claimed a Hawker Typhoon fighter north-northwest of Goderville and another Spitfire on 16 April north-northwest of Saint-Valery-en-Caux.

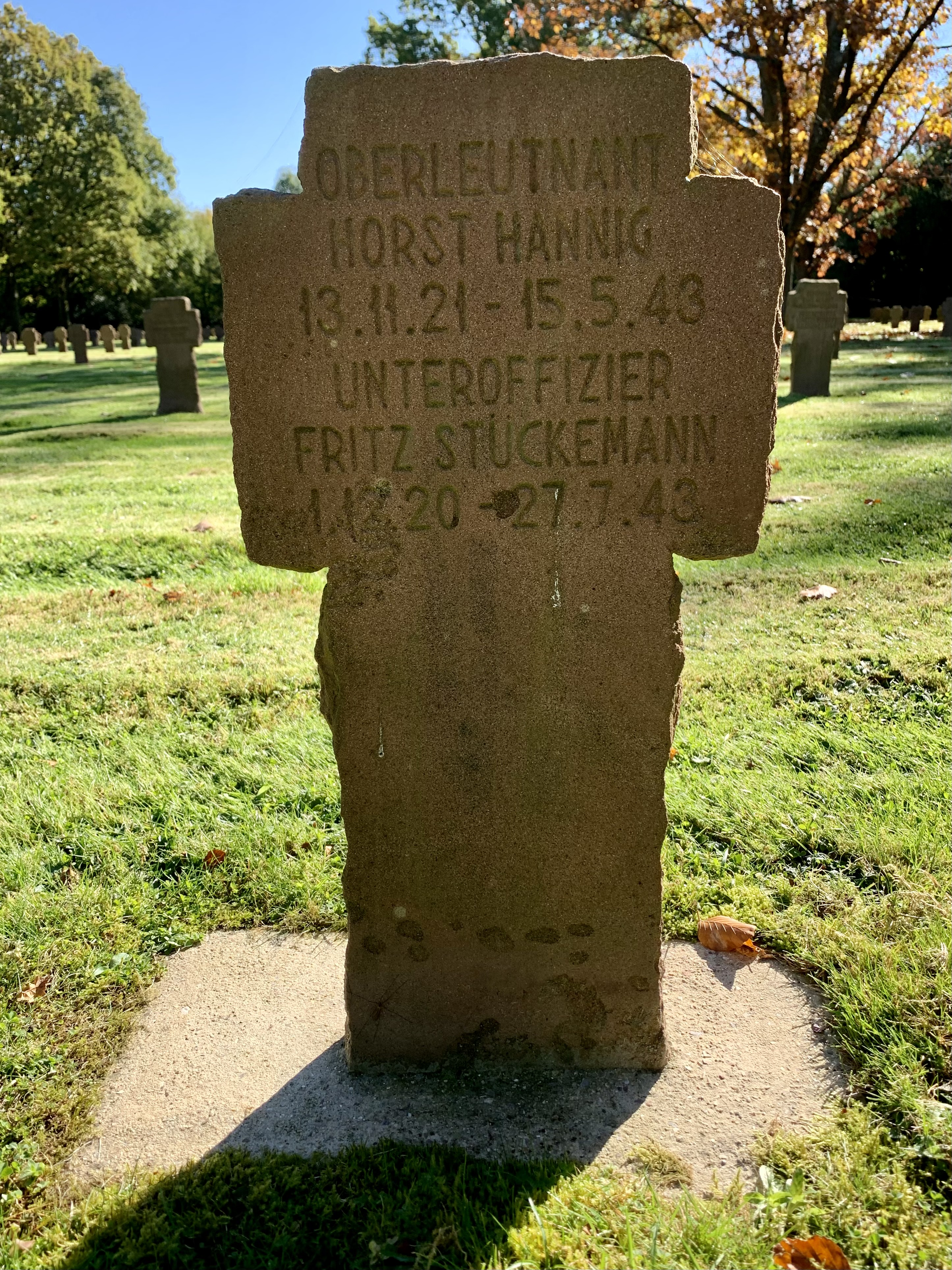
His grave at the Saint-Désir-de-Lisieux German war cemetery.

The Royal Air Force (RAF) targeted the Caen-Carpiquet Airdrome on 15 May 1943. Defending against this attack, elements of I. Gruppe intercepted the RAF fighters and claimed four aerial victories, two of which were not confirmed. Hannig was credited with the destruction of a Spitfire shot down east of Troarn, his 98th aerial victory. In this engagement JG 3 lost four aircraft with three pilots killed in action, including Hannig. He was shot down in his Focke-Wulf Fw 190 A-4 (Werknummer 0734) near the airfield at Rocquancourt. His victor was Squadron Leader J. Charles leading Yellow Section of No. 611 Squadron. He had managed to bail out but his parachute failed to open. Hannig was posthumously awarded the 364th Knight's Cross of the Iron Cross with Oak Leaves (Ritterkreuz des Eisernen Kreuzes mit Eichenlaub) on 3 January 1944 and posthumously promoted to Oberleutnant (first Lieutenant). He was interred at the Saint-Désir-de-Lisieux German war cemetery. He was succeeded by Oberleutnant Karl Haberland as commander of 2. Staffel.

== Summary of career ==
=== Aerial victory claims ===
According to US historian David T. Zabecki, Hannig was credited with 98 aerial victories. Obermaier and Spick also list him with 98 aerial victories, 90 on the Eastern Front and 8 on the Western Front, claimed in over 350 combat missions. Mathews and Foreman, authors of Luftwaffe Aces — Biographies and Victory Claims, researched the German Federal Archives and found documentation for 97 aerial victory claims. This number includes 90 on the Eastern Front and 7 on the Western Front, including one four-engined bomber.

Victory claims were logged to a map-reference (PQ = Planquadrat), for example "PQ 54251". The Luftwaffe grid map (Jägermeldenetz) covered all of Europe, western Russia and North Africa and was composed of rectangles measuring 15 minutes of latitude by 30 minutes of longitude, an area of about 360 square miles (930 km^{2}). These sectors were then subdivided into 36 smaller units to give a location area 3 km × 4 km (1.9 mi × 2.5 mi) in size.

Chronicle of aerial victories
This and the ? (question mark) indicates information discrepancies listed by Prien, Stemmer, Rodeike, Bock, Mathews and Foreman.
Claim	Date	Time	Type	Location	Claim	Date	Time	Type	Location
– 6. Staffel of Jagdgeschwader 54 – Operation Barbarossa — 22 June – 5 December 1941
1	22 June 1941	17:27	SB-2		16	19 August 1941	07:10	I-16	
2	27 June 1941	13:50	DB-3		17	5 September 1941	15:20	I-15	
3	30 June 1941	13:12	SB-2		18	11 September 1941	13:00	I-18 (MiG-1)	
4	2 July 1941	20:30	SB-3		19	11 September 1941	13:15	I-18 (MiG-1)	
5	2 July 1941	20:40	SB-3		20	12 September 1941	15:00	I-18 (MiG-1)	
6	2 July 1941	20:42	SB-3		21	14 September 1941	17:09	I-18 (MiG-1)	
7	6 July 1941	09:10	SB-2		22	16 September 1941	16:00	I-18 (MiG-1)	
8	19 July 1941	06:20	I-18 (MiG-1)		23	17 September 1941	09:25	I-18 (MiG-1)	
9	25 July 1941	07:57	DB-3		24	19 September 1941	07:20	I-18 (MiG-1)	
10	12 August 1941	12:55	I-16		25	23 September 1941	07:35	I-18 (MiG-1)	
11	12 August 1941	17:15	I-18 (MiG-1)		26	23 September 1941	10:03	I-18 (MiG-1)	
12	13 August 1941	08:17	I-16		27	26 September 1941	10:50	I-16	
13	14 August 1941	09:25	SB-2		28	2 October 1941	09:30	I-18 (MiG-1)	
14	18 August 1941	12:15	I-18 (MiG-1)		29	5 October 1941	16:20	I-18 (MiG-1)	
15	18 August 1941	12:35	I-18 (MiG-1)		30	14 October 1941	15:31	SB-3	
– 5. Staffel of Jagdgeschwader 54 – Eastern Front — 20 January – 30 April 1942
31	5 February 1942	15:30	I-18 (MiG-1)	northwest of Orelje	40	5 April 1942	16:05	I-18 (MiG-1)	
32	14 February 1942	14:50	R-5		41	15 April 1942	07:45	LaGG-3	
33	17 February 1942	11:31	R-5		42	16 April 1942	07:45	Yak-1	
34	23 February 1942	16:10	Pe-2		43	18 April 1942	06:35	MiG-3	
35	5 March 1942	16:05	P-40		44	19 April 1942	07:40	LaGG-3	
36	15 March 1942	08:50	I-18 (MiG-1)		45	20 April 1942	13:00	MiG-3	
37	26 March 1942	08:30	I-18 (MiG-1)		46	20 April 1942	05:10	R-5	
38	28 March 1942	14:05	I-26 (Yak-1)		47	24 April 1942	19:40	Yak-1	
39	30 March 1942	09:35	R-5		48	24 April 1942	07:40	Yak-1	
– 5. Staffel of Jagdgeschwader 54 – Eastern Front — 1 May 1942 – 3 February 1943
49	7 May 1942	12:25	Yak-1		70	22 August 1942	18:05	LaGG-3	PQ 54251; 25 km (16 mi) west-northwest of Belyov
50	11 May 1942	04:40	MiG-3		71	23 August 1942	10:05	Yak-1	PQ 64262; 25 km (16 mi) northwest of Plavsk
51	15 May 1942	04:35	LaGG-3		72	24 August 1942	12:45	Yak-1	south of Zubtsov; 15 km (9.3 mi) west-northwest of Belyov
52	18 May 1942	08:25	LaGG-3		73	25 August 1942	18:20	MiG-3	PQ 54263 south of Lubzoff
53	7 July 1942	10:00	Yak-1	Zaluchye	74	1 September 1942	10:08	MiG-3	PQ 10243; 25 km (16 mi) east-southeast of Shlisselburg
54	24 July 1942	11:00	Il-2	Lychkovo	75	2 September 1942	09:29	Yak-1	PQ 00582; 15 km (9.3 mi) west-southwest of Shlisselburg
55	27 July 1942	19:07	Yak-1	east of Pola train station	76	2 September 1942	18:20	Yak-1	eastern area of Leningrad
56	2 August 1942	12:35	Pe-2	southwest of Kresttsy	77	17 September 1942	16:33	Yak-1	PQ 2912
57	3 August 1942	10:00	Yak-1	northeast of Pola train station	78	28 September 1942	10:20? (Note: According to Mathews and Foreman claimed at 10:05.)	Yak-1	PQ 10441; 30 km (19 mi) south-southeast of Staraya Russa
58	9 August 1942	10:10	Yak-1	PQ 56164; 30 km (19 mi) southwest of Volokolamsk	79	6 October 1942	12:55	MiG-3	PQ 38714; 10 km (6.2 mi) north of Ostashkov
59	9 August 1942	15:28	Yak-1	PQ 56152; 45 km (28 mi) north-northeast of Gagarin	80	12 October 1942	15:50	LaGG-3	PQ 38783; 15 km (9.3 mi) southeast of Ostashkov
60	10 August 1942	15:55	Yak-1	PQ 47421; 20 km (12 mi) north-northwest of Staritsa	81	14 October 1942	16:26	Il-2	PQ 19333; 20 km (12 mi) north-northeast of Novgorod
61	10 August 1942	18:32	Yak-1	PQ 47562; 15 km (9.3 mi) north of Rzhev	82	28 October 1942	10:00	LaGG-3	PQ 18264; 30 km (19 mi) east-southeast of Staraya Russa
62	12 August 1942	18:50	Il-2	PQ 54473; 25 km (16 mi) west-northwest of Bolkhov	83	28 October 1942	10:03	LaGG-3	PQ 18264; 30 km (19 mi) east-southeast of Staraya Russa
63	14 August 1942	18:47	Yak-1	PQ 55882; 25 km (16 mi) east-southeast of Sukhinichi	84	29 October 1942	10:45	LaGG-3	PQ 28112; 40 km (25 mi) northwest of Demyansk
64	15 August 1942	10:45	Yak-1	PQ 54182; 30 km (19 mi) east-northeast of Zhizdra	85	30 October 1942	08:35	LaGG-3	PQ 18282; 30 km (19 mi) east-southeast of Staraya Russa
65	15 August 1942	11:00	Yak-1	PQ 54242; 25 km (16 mi) south-southeast of Sukhinichi	86	31 October 1942	16:40	Il-2	PQ 09871
66	21 August 1942	06:30	I-180 (Yak-7)	PQ 55872; 15 km (9.3 mi) southeast of Sukhinichi	87	5 November 1942	08:00	LaGG-3	13 km (8.1 mi) north of Pola train station
67	22 August 1942	06:03	Il-2	PQ 54462; 20 km (12 mi) north-northwest of Bolkhov	88	5 November 1942	08:10	LaGG-3	PQ 28112; 40 km (25 mi) northwest of Demyansk
68	22 August 1942	06:10	Il-2	PQ 54424; 25 km (16 mi) southwest of Belyov	89	5 November 1942	08:15	LaGG-3	PQ 28111; 40 km (25 mi) northwest of Demyansk
69	22 August 1942	14:55	Il-2	PQ 64173 vicinity of Belyov	90	5 November 1942	14:25	LaGG-3	PQ 28664; 25 km (16 mi) north-northwest of Ostashkov
– 2. Staffel of Jagdgeschwader 2 "Richthofen" – Western Front — 1 January – 15 May 1943
91	16 February 1943	11:55	B-17	50 km (31 mi) northeast of Lannion	95	13 April 1943	16:48	Spitfire	10 km (6.2 mi) southwest of Caen
92	28 March 1943	13:26	Spitfire	40 km (25 mi) northwest of Fécamp	96	15 April 1943	17:00	Typhoon	2 km (1.2 mi) north-northwest of Goderville
93	4 April 1943	10:05	Spitfire	40 km (25 mi) northeast of Cherbourg	97	16 April 1943	08:50	Spitfire	45 km (28 mi) north-northwest of Saint-Valery-en-Caux
94	13 April 1943	16:46	Spitfire	12 km (7.5 mi) southwest of Caen	98? (Note: This claim is not listed by Mathews and Foreman.)	15 May 1943	17:06	Spitfire	3 km (1.9 mi) east of Troarn

=== Awards ===
- Iron Cross (1939)
  - 2nd Class (17 July 1941)
  - 1st Class (September 1941)
- Honor Goblet of the Luftwaffe on 15 September 1941 as Leutnant in a Jagdgeschwader
- German Cross in Gold on 24 November 1941 as Leutnant in the II./Jagdgeschwader 54
- Knight's Cross of the Iron Cross with Oak Leaves
  - Knight's Cross on 9 May 1942 as Leutnant and pilot in the 6./Jagdgeschwader 54 (Note: According to Scherzer as pilot in the 5./Jagdgeschwader 54.)
  - 364th Oak Leaves on 3 January 1944 (posthumously) as Leutnant and Staffelführer of the 2./Jagdgeschwader 2 "Richthofen"
