= St Désir-de-Lisieux War Cemetery =

WWI CWGC cemetery in Calvados, France

Coordinates: 49°08′20″N 0°09′47″E

The St Désir-de-Lisieux War Cemetery is found approximately 4 km (2.5 mi) to the west of Lisieux, Normandy. It is unusual in that it is linked by pathway to a German cemetery, the Saint-Désir-de-Lisieux German war cemetery. Half way that path, there is a small memorial with flagpoles flying British, French, German and EU colours. There were 520 Commonwealth graves until 78 graves were reinterred from Chartres after the war. A large number of soldiers from the 51st (Highland) Division are buried at St. Désir and four victims of the First World War.
