= Hegau-Gymnasium =

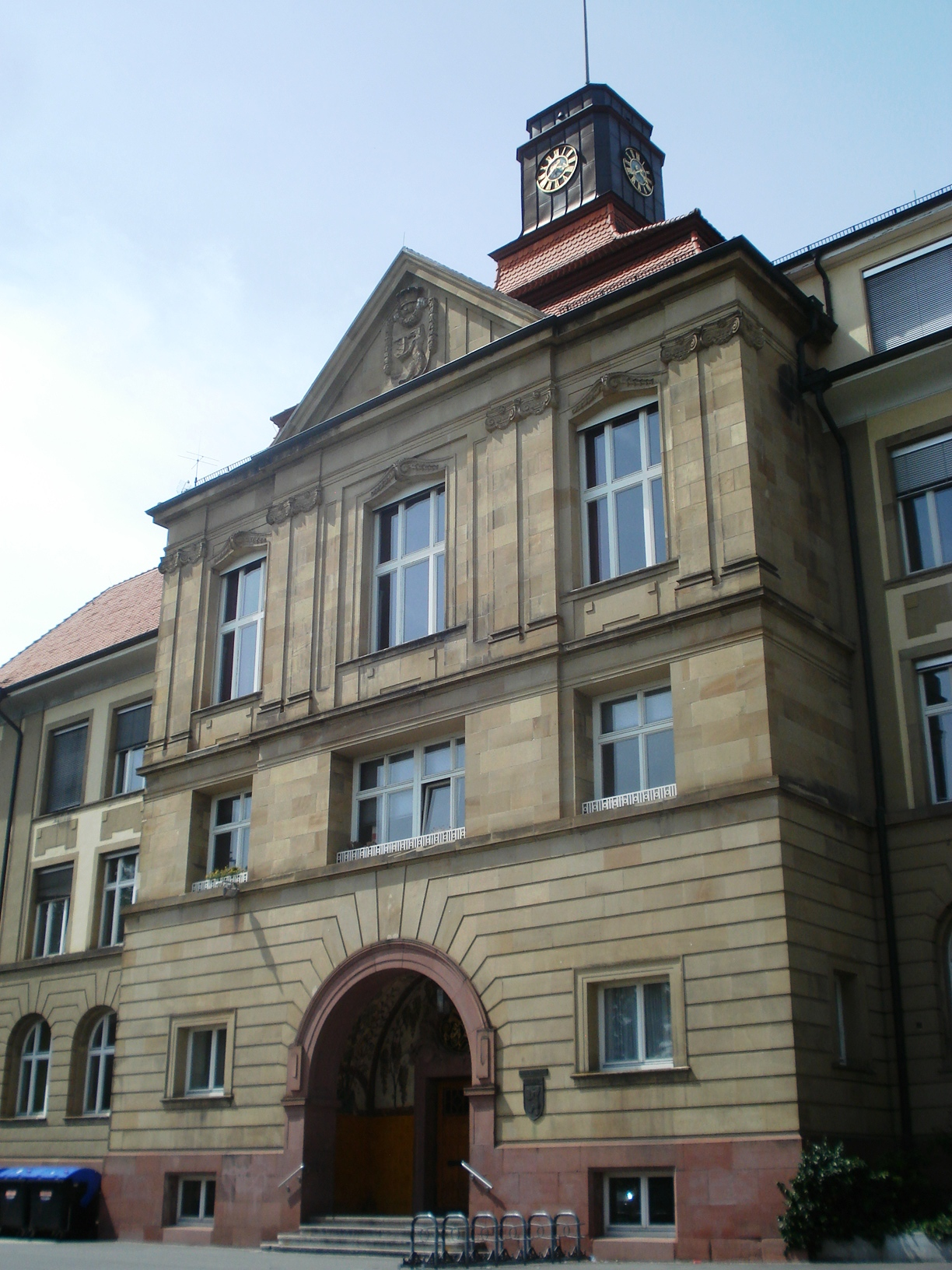
- Hegau-Gymnasium, as seen from the Alemannenstraße

Location
- Alemannenstraße 21; Singen; Germany
- Coordinates: 47°45′52.4″N 8°50′17.2″E

Information
- School type: Gymnasium
- Established: 1899
- Grades: 5–12
- Website: https://hegau-gymnasium.edupage.org/

Hegau-Gymnasium (German: Hegau-Gymnasium) is a gymnasium in Singen in the very south of Baden-Württemberg in southern Germany. The school is named after the extinct Hegau volcanic landscape.

== History ==
The school was founded in 1899. In 1934, the school was renamed Langemarck-Realgymnasium, named after the location of the World War I Battle of Langemarck. It was one of the earliest schools renamed in the era of National Socialism in Germany. From the end of the war until Feb.25th, 1946, the school building was requisitioned by the French occupying forces. Today Hegau-Gymnasium has a so-called Abi-Bac section and boasts the title of "Partner School for Europe".

== Students ==
- Volker Kauder (*1949), member of the German Bundestag
- Egon Mayer (1917–1944), German World War II fighter pilot
