= Werner Machold =

German World War II flying ace (1913–1968)

- Machold as an Oberleutnant
- Born: 29 July 1911; Unterneubrunn, Duchy of Saxe-Meiningen, German Empire
- Died: 2 April 1968 (aged 56); Landsberg am Lech, West Germany
- Military career
- Allegiance: Nazi Germany
- Branch: Reichsmarine (to 1935); Luftwaffe
- Service years: 1931–1945
- Rank: Oberleutnant (first lieutenant)
- Unit: JG 2
- Commands: 7./JG 2
- Conflicts: World War II: Battle of France; Battle of Britain
- Awards: Knight's Cross of the Iron Cross

Werner Machold (29 July 1911 – 2 April 1968) was a Luftwaffe ace and recipient of the Knight's Cross of the Iron Cross during World War II. The Knight's Cross of the Iron Cross, and its variants were the highest awards in the military and paramilitary forces of Nazi Germany during World War II. On 9 June 1941, Machold received fire from a destroyer that he was attacking near Portland, his plane was forced to land and he was taken prisoner by British troops. He remained in captivity until the end of the war. He was credited with 32 aerial victories during the war, all of them against Western forces. Machold died on 2 April 1968 in Landsberg am Lech, West Germany.

== Early life and career ==
Machold was born on 29 July 1913 in Unterneubrunn in the district of Hildburghausen in Thuringia of the German Empire. (Note: According to Obermaier, Machold was born on 29 July 1913.) In 1931, Machold joined the Reichsmarine, the German navy of the Weimar Republic, and in 1935 transferred to the newly emerging Luftwaffe. Following flight and fighter pilot training, (Note: Flight training in the Luftwaffe progressed through the levels A1, A2 and B1, B2, referred to as A/B flight training. A training included theoretical and practical training in aerobatics, navigation, long-distance flights and dead-stick landings. The B courses included high-altitude flights, instrument flights, night landings and training to handle the aircraft in difficult situations.) he was posted to 1. Staffel (1st squadron) of Jagdgeschwader 2 "Richthofen" (JG 2—2nd Fighter Wing) in 1939.

== World War II ==
World War II in Europe had begun on Friday 1 September 1939 when German forces invaded Poland. During the invasion, Machold flew fighter protection missions over Berlin. At the time, 1. Staffel was commanded by Hauptmann Ernst-Günther Burggaller. The Staffel was subordinated to I. Gruppe (1st group) of JG 2 headed by Oberstleutnant Carl Vieck. During the invasion of Poland, I. Gruppe was initially based at Döberitz, located approximately 10 kilometers (6.2 miles) west of Staaken. On 10 September, the Gruppe moved to Lyck in East Prussia, now Ełk in Poland, before returning to Döberitz on 13 October.

In preparation for the Battle of France, I. Gruppe had moved to Frankfurt-Rebstock Airfield. On 10 May, the first day of the campaign, the Gruppe moved to a makeshift airfield at Kirchberg, flying in support of Army Group A. The Gruppe then relocated to Bastogne on 14 May to fly over the combat area of the Meuse. That day, Machold was credited with his first aerial victories. He claimed two French Morane-Saulnier M.S.406 fighters shot down near Sedan. On early evening of 20 May, Machold claimed a Bristol Blenheim bomber and a Hawker Hurricane fighter shot down near Péronne. This included JG 2's 100th claim to date. By the end of the French campaign, Machold had been awarded both classes of the Iron Cross (Eisernes Kreuz).

=== Battle of Britain ===
In preparation for the Battle of Britain against the Royal Air Force, I. Gruppe moved to an airfield at Beaumont-le-Roger on 27 June. Initially, the Gruppe was tasked with flying fighter protection along the French coast and over the English Channel. On 11 August, I. Gruppe escorted two Gruppen of Junkers Ju 88 bombers from Kampfgeschwader 54 (KG 54—54th Bomber Wing) on their mission to the harbors at Portland and Weymouth. On this mission, Machold claimed an aerial victory which he filed as a Tomahawk, probably a Curtiss Hawk Model 75. On a morning mission flown on 13 August, also known as Adlertag, Machold claimed an aerial victory near Brighton.

On 5 September, Machold was awarded the Knight's Cross of the Iron Cross (Ritterkreuz des Eisernen Kreuzes) for 21 aerial victories claimed. He was the third pilot of JG 2 to receive this distinction. Two days later, Machold was transferred to 9. Staffel of JG 2. The Staffel was then commanded by Oberleutnant Carl-Hans Röders and subordinated to III. Gruppe of JG 2 headed by Major Erich Mix and based at Évreux.

=== Squadron leader and prisoner of war ===
In early 1941, Machold, who had been promoted to Oberleutnant (first lieutenant), was appointed Staffelkapitän (squadron leader) of 7. Staffel of JG 2. He succeeded Hauptmann Armin Ettling who had already been transferred in 1940. The Staffel was based at Bernay and had started converting to a fighter bomber squadron in late 1940. The pilots received fighter bomber training with Erprobungsgruppe 210, a special-purpose unit tasked with the testing of new aircraft and weaponry under operational conditions, which was then based at Denain. On 16 April, Machold claimed a Spitfire fighter shot down over the Strait of Dover.

According to Weal, Machold claimed two Supermarine Spitfire fighters, probably belonging to the No. 234 Squadron, shot down on 19 May, his last aerial victories filed. (Note: The authors Prien, Stemmer, Rodeike and Bock list two Supermarine Spitfire fighters claimed shot down by an unknown pilot west of Weymouth on 19 May 1942.) On 9 June, Machold led a fighter bomber attack on Allied shipping off the coast at Dorset. He was possibly shot down by anti-aircraft artillery fired from HMS Blencathra. The engine of his Messerschmitt Bf 109 E-7/Z (Werknummer 5983–factory number) overheated and made a forced landing near Swanage where he was taken prisoner of war (POW). In consequence, command of 7. Staffel was transferred to Oberleutnant Egon Mayer. Machold was sent to a POW camp in Canada where he remained for the rest of the war.

== Later life ==
Machold was released and returned to Germany in 1946. He died on 2 April 1968 at the age of 56 in Landsberg am Lech, West Germany.

== Summary of career ==
=== Aerial victory claims ===
According to Obermaier, Machold was credited with 32 aerial victories claimed in over 250 combat missions. Holmes lists him with 13 Spitfire fighters shot down. Mathews and Foreman, authors of Luftwaffe Aces — Biographies and Victory Claims, researched the German Federal Archives and found records for 23 aerial victory claims, plus four further unconfirmed claims, all of which claimed on the Western Front.

Chronicle of aerial victories
This and the ? (question mark) indicates information discrepancies listed by Prien, Stemmer, Rodeike, Bock, Forsyth, Mathews and Foreman.
Claim	Date	Time	Type	Location	Claim	Date	Time	Type	Location
– 1. Staffel of Jagdgeschwader 2 "Richthofen" – Battle of France — 10 May – 25 June 1940
1	14 May 1940	20:00	M.S.406	Sedan south of Bouillon	6	21 May 1940	19:10	M.S.406	Compiègne
2? (Note: According to Mathews and Foreman, this claim is unconfirmed.)	14 May 1940	20:05	M.S.406	Sedan vicinity of Clavy	7	21 May 1940	19:10	M.S.406	Compiègne
3	19 May 1940	12:50	Hurricane	Cambrai	8	26 May 1940	17:00	Spitfire	Calais
4	20 May 1940	18:35	Blenheim	Péronne	9	3 June 1940	14:45	MB.150	south of Reims
5	20 May 1940	18:35	Blenheim	Péronne	10?	3 June 1940	14:50	MB.150	south of Reims
– 1. Staffel of Jagdgeschwader 2 "Richthofen" – Battle of Britain — 26 June – 7 September 1940
11	11 August 1940	11:55	Curtiss	Portland	17	31 August 1940	14:15	Hurricane	Lydd
12	13 August 1940	07:50	Spitfire	Brighton	18	2 September 1940	14:25	Spitfire	New Romney
13	26 August 1940	17:30	Spitfire	Portsmouth	19	2 September 1940	14:25	Spitfire	New Romney
14	30 August 1940	12:40	Hurricane	London	20	2 September 1940	18:20	Spitfire	Sittingbourne
15	30 August 1940	18:00	Hurricane	Goudhurst	21	4 September 1940	10:10	Hurricane	Folkestone
16	30 August 1940	18:05	Hurricane	Goudhurst					
– 9. Staffel of Jagdgeschwader 2 "Richthofen" – Battle of Britain — 7 September 1940 – early 1941
22?	27 September 1940	13:05	Spitfire	east of Portland	25	30 September 1940	17:45	Hurricane	Yeovil
23	28 September 1940	15:55	Hurricane	Selsey Bill	26	30 September 1940	17:50	Hurricane	Sherborne
24	30 September 1940	17:35	Hurricane	north of Portland					
– 7. Staffel of Jagdgeschwader 2 "Richthofen" – Battle of Britain — early 1941 – 9 June 1941
27? (Note: This claim is not listed by Prien, Stemmer, Rodeike and Bock.)	16 April 1941	12:00	Spitfire	Strait of Dover					

=== Awards ===
- Iron Cross (1939) 2nd and 1st Class
- Knight's Cross of the Iron Cross on 5 September 1940 as Oberfeldwebel and pilot in the 7./Jagdgeschwader 2 "Richthofen" (Note: According to Scherzer as pilot in the I./Jagdgeschwader 2 "Richthofen".)
