= Saint-Désir-de-Lisieux German war cemetery =

WWII cemetery in Calvados, France

- German War Graves Commission (Volksbund Deutsche Kriegsgräberfürsorge)
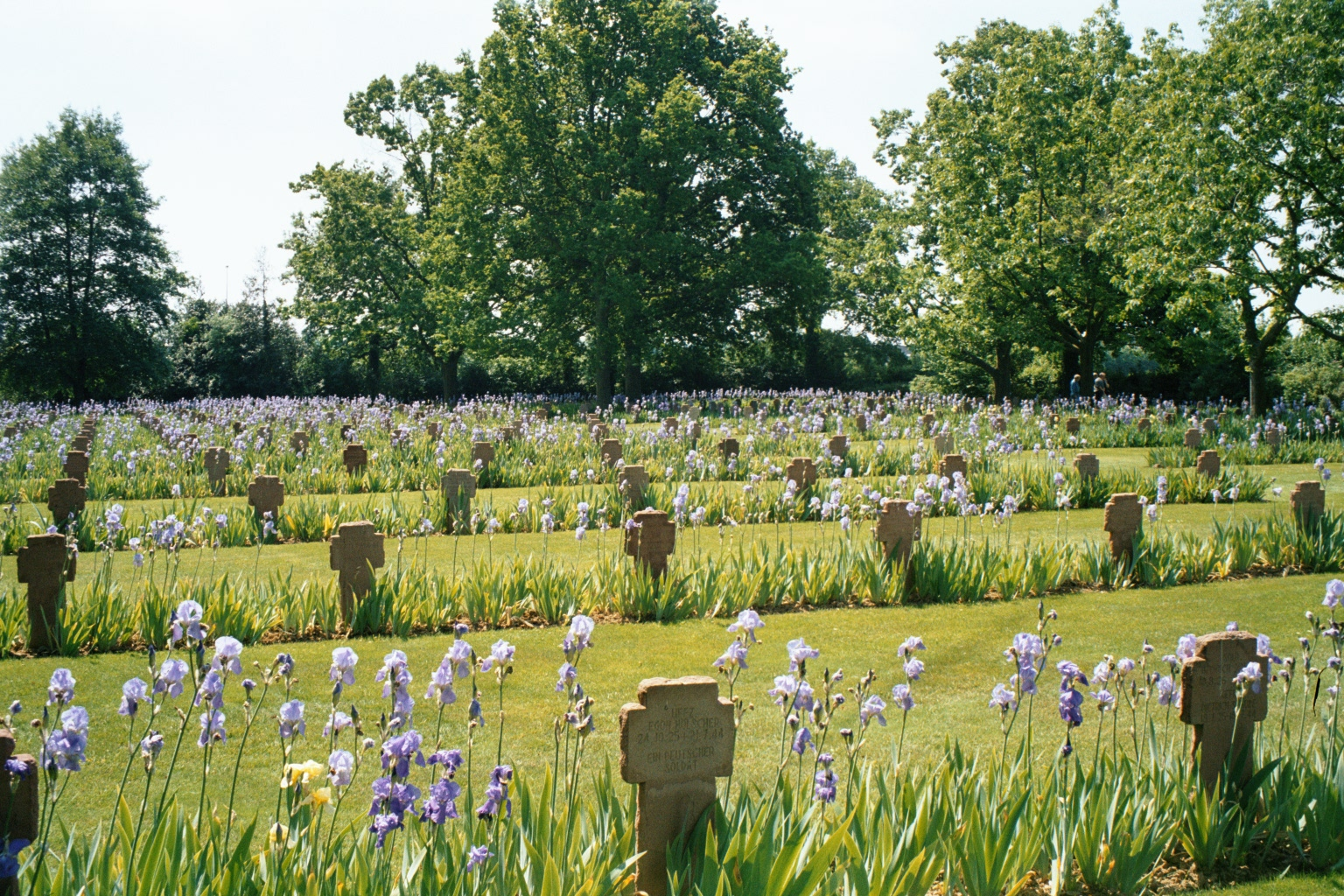
- Red sandstone grave markers in the German war cemetery at Saint-Désir-de-Lisieux
- Used for those deceased 1944
- Established: 1944 (Finished 1961)
- Location: 49°08′21″N 0°09′54″E near Lisieux, Calvados, France
- Total burials: 3,735

Burials by nation
- Germany

Burials by war
- World War II

Saint-Désir-de-Lisieux is a Second World War German military war grave cemetery, located close to the village of Saint-Désir and 4 km (2.5 mi) west of Lisieux in the Calvados department, Normandy, France. It is located adjacent to the British Saint-Désir War Cemetery and is unique as the two burial grounds are linked by a pathway. It is the smallest German war cemetery in Normandy and contains the remains of 3,735 German military personnel. The cemetery was created by the British Graves Registration Commission in August 1944 with British and German casualties buried in adjacent fields.

Saint-Désir-de-Lisieux is usually chosen as the cemetery for newly discovered German war dead from across Normandy. The cemetery is maintained and managed by the voluntary German War Graves Commission (Volksbund Deutsche Kriegsgräberfürsorge).

== History ==
The majority of the German war dead buried at Saint-Désir-de-Lisieux were killed during the last days of the Battle of Normandy and inside the Falaise Pocket in August 1944. A high number come from the 7th, 15th, 7th Panzer Armies as the Allies pushed the Germans out of Normandy, across the Seine and towards Paris. The British Graves Service created the cemetery for both fallen Commonwealth and German service personnel. German soldiers that had been buried in field graves and small local cemeteries were disinterred and brought to Saint-Désir-de-Lisieux.

== Formation ==
In the late 1950s the German War Graves Commission (Volksbund Deutsche Kriegsgräberfürsorge) remodelled and expanded the cemetery. Headstones were replaced with red sandstone plaques giving the names, ranks, dates of birth and death of two fallen German soldiers.

Saint-Désir-de-Lisieux was officially inaugurated as a German War Cemetery on 21 September 1961.

== Personal fates ==
Buried at the cemetery:

- Oberleutnant Horst Hannig, a fighter pilot ace with 98 aerial victories, killed in action May 1943.
- Major Kurt Ubben, a fighter pilot ace with 110 aerial victories, killed in action April 1944.
- Oberstleutnant Egon Mayer, a fighter pilot ace with 102 aerial victories, killed in action March 1944.
- Oberleutnant Eugen-Ludwig Zweigart, a fighter pilot ace with 69 aerial victories, killed in action June 1944.

== Volunteer maintenance ==
Unlike the American and Commonwealth War Graves Commissions, the German Commission is entirely voluntary and relies on gifts and collections to further its work. During the summer months one may see international school teenagers tending the graves. They volunteer to work with the Volksbund during their school holidays and visit American and German war cemeteries, memorials, sites of the invasion and take part in the memorial ceremony with veterans and the mayor of La Cambe.

== See also ==
- List of military cemeteries in Normandy
