= Les Champeaux =

- Commune
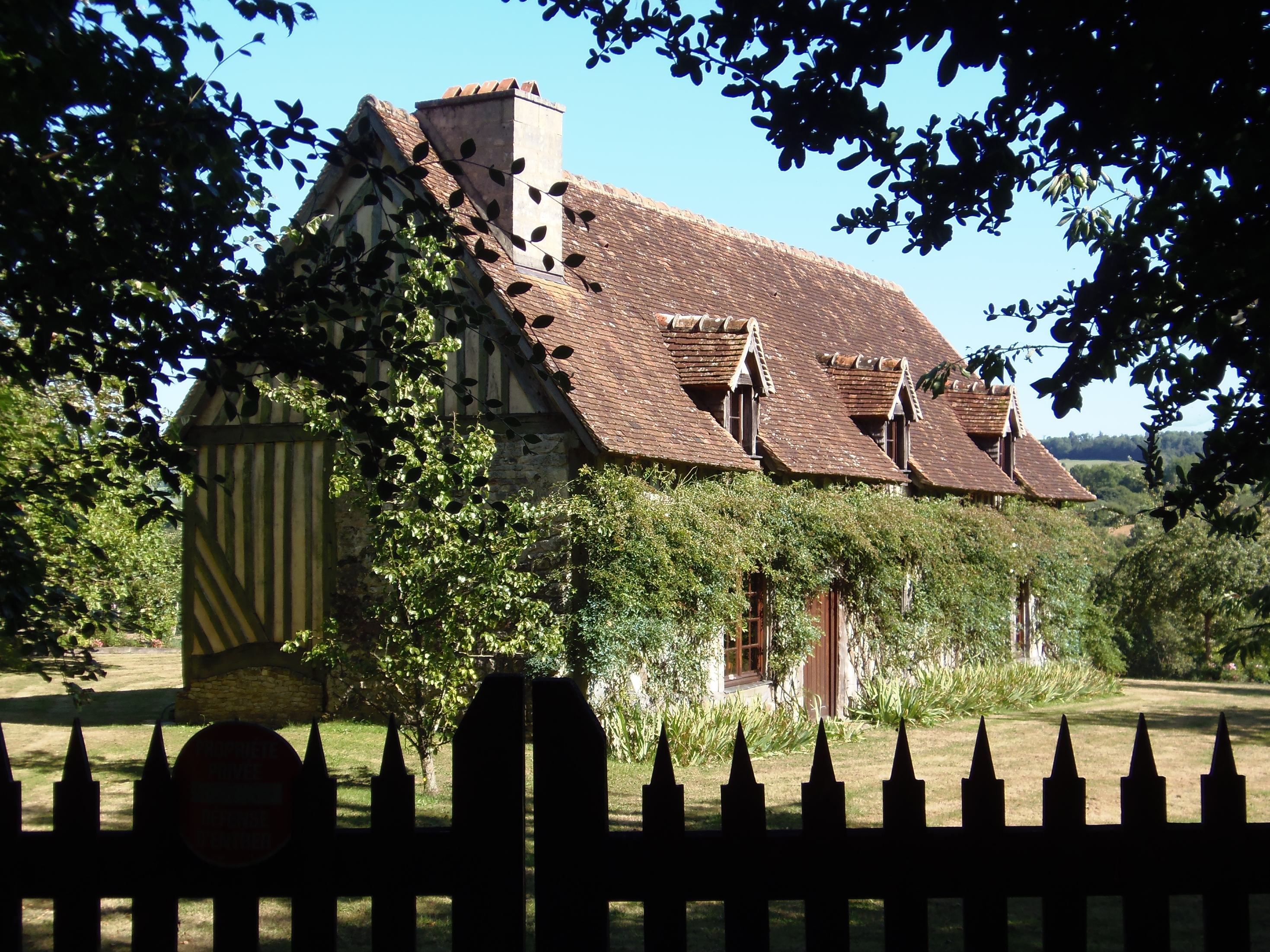
- The birthplace of Charlotte Corday
- Location of Les Champeaux
- Location within France Location within Normandy
- Coordinates: 48°53′38″N 0°08′01″E
- Country: France
- Region: Normandy
- Department: Orne
- Arrondissement: Mortagne-au-Perche
- Canton: Vimoutiers
- Intercommunality: Vallées d'Auge et du Merlerault

Government
  - Mayor (2020–2026): François Bisson
- Area^{1}: 9.65 km^{2} (3.73 sq mi)
- Elevation: 266 m (873 ft)
- Highest elevation: 267 m (876 ft)
- Lowest elevation: 142 m (466 ft)
- Population (2023): 96
  - Density: 9.9/km^{2} (26/sq mi)
- Time zone: UTC+01:00 (CET)
  - Summer (DST): UTC+02:00 (CEST)
- INSEE/Postal code: 61086 /61120
- ^{1} French Land Register data, which excludes lakes, ponds, glaciers > 1 km^{2} (0.386 sq mi or 247 acres) and river estuaries.

Les Champeaux (French pronunciation: [le ʃɑ̃po]) is a commune in the Orne department in north-western France. As of 2019, its population is 107.

== Geography ==
The commune is made up of the following collection of villages and hamlets, Les Cardellières and Les Champeaux.

The commune has one river, the Viette and four streams, the Moulin Neuf, the Besion, the Crouttes & the Chateau running through its borders.

== Notable buildings and places ==
=== National heritage sites ===
Ferme du Ronceray or Ferme des Lignerits a 16th-century Farm house, that was the birthplace of Charlotte Corday, it was classified as a Monument historique in 1989.

== Notable people ==
- Charlotte Corday (1768-1793) French Revolution who assassinated revolutionary and Jacobin leader Jean-Paul Marat was born here.

== See also ==
- Communes of the Orne department
