= Bombing of France during World War II =

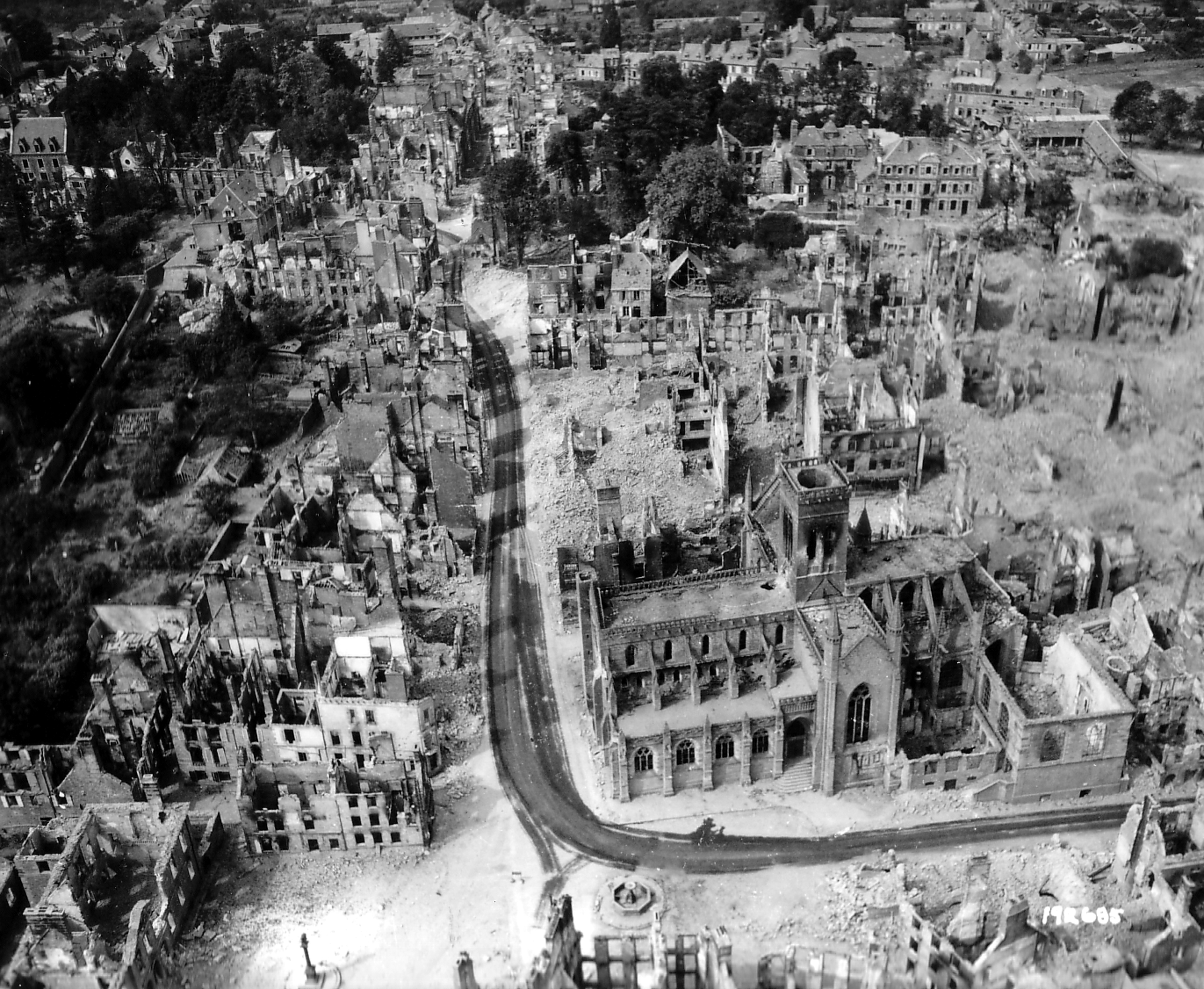
Aerial view after the bombardment in Vire, Normandy, 1944

Between the time of the German victory in the Battle of France and the liberation of the country, the Allied Forces bombed many locations in France. In all 1,570 French cities and towns were bombed by the Allies between June 1940 and May 1945. The total number of civilians killed was, at least, of 68,778 men, women and children (including the 2,700 civilians killed in Royan).

The total number of injured was more than 100,000. The total number of houses completely destroyed by the bombings was 432,000, and the number of partly destroyed houses was 890,000. The cities that saw the most destruction were the following:

- Saint-Nazaire (Loire Atlantique): 100%
- Tilly-la-Campagne (Calvados): 96%
- Calais (Pas-de-Calais) : 95%
- Vire (Calvados): 95%
- Royan (Charente-Maritime): 95%
- Le Portel (Pas-de-Calais) : 94%
- Dunkerque (Nord) : 90%
- Villers-Bocage (Calvados): 88%
- Boulogne-sur-Mer (Pas-de-Calais) : 85%
- Le Havre (Seine-Maritime): 82%
- Beauvais (Oise) : 80%
- Lorient (Morbihan) : 80 %
- Brest (Finistère) : 80 %
- Saint-Lô (Manche): 77%
- Falaise (Calvados): 76%
- Lisieux (Calvados): 75%

The bombings in Normandy before and after D-Day were especially devastating. The French historian Henri Amouroux in La Grande histoire des Français sous l’Occupation, says that 20,000 civilians were killed in Calvados department, 10,000 in Seine-Maritime, 14,800 in the Manche, 4,200 in the Orne, around 3,000 in the Eure. All together, that makes more than 50,000 killed. During the year 1943 alone, 7,458 French civilians died under Allied bombs.

The deadliest Allied bombings during the German occupation were:

- Boulogne-Billancourt near Paris 2–3 March 1942, more than 600 people killed,
- Saint-Nazaire 9, 14, 17 and 18 November 1942, 228 dead,
- Rennes 8 March 1943, 299 dead,
- Boulogne-Billancourt again 4 April 1943, 403 dead,
- Le Portel 8 September 1943, 510 dead,
- Paris western suburbs 9 and 15 September 1943, 395 dead,
- Nantes 16 and 23 September 1943, 1,247 dead,
- Toulon 24 November 1943, 450 dead)
- Lille 9–10 April 1944, 450 dead,
- Rouen 18–19 April 1944, 900 dead,
- Noisy-le-Sec 18–19 April 1944, 464 dead,
- Juvisy-sur-Orge 18–19 April 1944, 392 dead,
- Paris-La Chapelle 20–21 April 1944, 670 dead,
- Sartrouville 27–28 May 1944, 400 dead,
- Orléans 19 and 23 May 1944, 300 dead,
- Saint-Etienne 26 May 1944, more than 1,000 dead,
- Lyon 26 May 1944, 717 dead,
- Marseille 27 May 1944, 1,752 dead,
- Avignon 27 May 1944, 525 dead,
- Lisieux 6–7 June 1944, 700 dead,
- Vire 6–7 June 1944, 400 dead,
- Caen 6–7 June 1944, more than 1,000 dead,
- Le Havre 5–11 September 1944, more than 5,000 dead,
- Royan 5 January 1945, 1,700 dead, etc.

On May 27, 1943, Allied bombings killed 3,012 French civilians in bomb runs over Marseille, Avignon, Nîmes, Amiens, Sartrouville, Maisons-Laffitte and Eauplet.

== See also ==
- Battle for Caen
- Bombing of Normandy
- Operation Charnwood
