= Big Week =

1944 series of aerial bombings of German industry by the U.S. during WWII

Operation Argument
- Part of the Combined Bomber Offensive of the Western Front of World War II
Date	20–25 February 1944
Location	Nazi Germany, Nazi-occupied Netherlands
Result	see Aftermath

Belligerents
United States; United Kingdom	Germany

Commanders and leaders
(United States) Jimmy Doolittle (United States) Carl Spaatz (United Kingdom) Arthur Harris	(Nazi Germany) Hermann Göring (Nazi Germany) Adolf Galland

Strength
(United States) US Eighth Air Force (United States) US Fifteenth Air Force (United Kingdom) RAF Bomber Command (United Kingdom) RAF Fighter Command	(Nazi Germany) Luftwaffe

Casualties and losses
RAF: 131 bombers USAAF: 226 heavy bombers 28 fighters Over 2,000 aircrew killed or captured	262 fighters 250 aircrew killed or injured, including nearly 100 pilots KIA
- c. 880 civilian deaths during the Bombing of Nijmegen, 57 civilian deaths in Arnhem, 40 civilian deaths in Enschede, 1 civilian death in Deventer.

Operation Argument, after the war dubbed Big Week, was a sequence of raids by the United States Army Air Forces and RAF Bomber Command from 20 to 25 February 1944, as part of the Combined Bomber Offensive against Nazi Germany. The objective of Operation Argument was to destroy aircraft factories in central and southern Germany in order to defeat the Luftwaffe before the Normandy landings during Operation Overlord were to take place later in 1944. (Note: '…the USSTAF attempted an all-out attack on the German aircraft industry to defeat the Luftwaffe. Secondly, American ground planners preparing the invasion had also assessed that the threat of the Luftwaffe had to be removed before Operation Overlord could take place. The result was Operation Argument, which outlined a series of coordinated bombardments against aircraft factories located in central and southern Germany.')

The joint daylight bombing campaign was also supported by RAF Bomber Command operating against the same targets at night. Arthur "Bomber" Harris resisted contributing RAF Bomber Command so as not to dilute the British "area bombing" offensive against Berlin. It took an order from Air Chief Marshal Sir Charles Portal, Chief of the Air Staff, to force Harris to comply.

RAF Fighter Command also provided escort for USAAF bomber formations, just at the time that the Eighth Air Force had started introducing the improved long range P-51 Mustang fighter which gave the USAAF bomber forces more cover deeper into Germany, to take over the role. The offensive overlapped the German Operation Steinbock, the Baby Blitz, which lasted from January to May 1944.

== Background ==
In the summer of 1943, the Luftwaffe had about 2,200 fighters available on average, and several bombing raids by the USAAF and RAF were repeatedly interrupted by 500 German fighters or more. Allied intelligence also indicated that the German aircraft industry was capable of producing about 2,000–3,000 planes per month, so the need to diminish the enemy's manufacturing potential soon was evident. Therefore, massive Allied air raids on German industrial areas had been conducted throughout 1943, but to little effect; the results were far lower than the expectations. German industrial complexes of multiple major factories (such as in Leipzig, Wiener Neustadt, and Regensburg) proved difficult to thoroughly destroy, easy to repair, and the logistics of transporting materials between factories were almost impossible to effectively disrupt.

Prior to Big Week, throughout 1943, the US 8th Air Force had been growing in size and experience and started pressing attacks deeper into Germany. It was originally believed that the defensive firepower of the ten or more .50 (12.7 mm) caliber machine guns on the Boeing B-17 Flying Fortress and Consolidated B-24 Liberator bombers would allow them to defend themselves as long as they remained arranged into tight formations, allowing for overlapping fire. Throughout 1942 the concept seemed solid enough, as the loss rate had been under 2%. However, the Luftwaffe reacted by sending more planes armed with heavier weaponry to oppose the raids, with increasing success, as evidenced by the example of the two Schweinfurt-Regensburg missions.

On 17 August 1943, 230 USAAF bombers launched a mission against the ball bearing factories in Schweinfurt and another 146 against the aircraft factories in Regensburg. Of this force, 60 aircraft were lost before returning to base and another 87 had to be scrapped due to irreparable damage. The Germans claimed 27 fighters lost, serious enough, but small in comparison to the losses on the part of the US forces. The Second Raid on Schweinfurt on 14 October 1943, remembered as "Black Thursday" while October 1943 as a whole as a "black month"), proved even more bloody; of the 291 aircraft on the mission, 60 were lost, with a further 17 damaged beyond repair. The self-defense concept appeared flawed enough, and losses among the bombers deemed unsustainable: daylight missions into Germany were canceled in order to rebuild the forces and find new tactics to fend off German fighters.

The raids were extensively studied by both sides. The Germans concluded that their tactic of deploying twin-engine heavy fighter designs, with heavy armament to make them usable as bomber destroyers and serving primarily with the Zerstörergeschwader combat wings, was working well. Over the winter of 1943–44 they continued this program, adding to their heavy fighter ranks and developing heavier armaments for all of their aircraft. Both sides observed that US fighters did a good job at protecting bombers and destroying German fighters; the Germans responded by pulling almost all of their fighter forces back into Germany itself, to attack US bombers where US fighters could not support the bombers due to lack of range. The Americans concluded they needed long range escort fighters and examined all aircraft they had that could fit the role. As early as July 1943 the North American P-51 Mustang appeared the most promising, thanks to its range, high altitude performance, and reliability. Over the winter they re-equipped many of their fighter squadrons as more Mustangs arrived and modifications allowed existing fighters to have a longer range. The Eighth Air Force was increasing in size as more complete bombardment and fighter groups arrived from the US. The Luftwaffe was increasing in size but the quality of training of their pilots was less than that of the new American units.

By early 1944, both forces had laid their plans and were waiting to put them into action. The US, confident in a fighter advantage, planned missions that would demand a German response. They decided to make massive raids on the German fighter factories. If the Germans chose not to respond, they would be at risk of losing the air war without firing a shot; if they did respond, they would meet the new long-range fighters in the process. The Germans needed no provocation: they were ready to meet a raid with their new forces. However, the increased weight of armaments in their fighters reduced performance, making them easy targets for the new and unexpected Mustangs.

== Planning ==
The goal of Operation Argument was to destroy aircraft factories in central and southern Germany in order to destroy the German aircraft industry as a whole. This would then allow Allied air superiority over the Luftwaffe to be achieved, which was considered absolutely critical in advance of the upcoming invasion of Northern France.

=== Strategy ===
Brinkhuis (1984) contended that the operation's target was attacking Germany's aircraft industry, 'going back to a plan that had already been made in October 1943. This plan, operation Argument, was the biggest Allied air action so far. The ambitious enterprise had the total destruction of the German aircraft industry as its goal.' 'The manufacture of these fighters, [such as Messerschmitt 109, 110, and the Focke-Wulf 190], saw such a steep rise that the USAAF and RAF had good reason to fear that the defense of Hitler's Festung Europa with all these aircraft would lead to a horrible massacre amongst Allied flight crews. Therefore, the primary goal of the Allied Airforce became the destruction of the factories producing these aircraft.' Planners estimated that the Allies would lose between 7% and 18% of their aircraft every day. In order to achieve the objective, U.S. commander Frederick L. Anderson was prepared to sacrifice three quarters of all planes and crew (meaning 736 bombers, from a total of 981 bombers). The Allies proceeded to gather intelligence on all parts of German industry involved in producing parts, engines, wings and airframes, as well as assembling factories. However, operational success was foreseen to heavily depend on several consecutive days of good weather, meaning ideal cloud covers between about 600 and 4,000 meters above England, but no clouds above the target areas in Germany. As such a situation was extremely rare, leadership decided to launch the campaign anyway as soon as the forecast showed the smallest signs of acceptable flying weather.

Similarly, Van Esch (2012) analyzed the Allied strategy from the perspective of the Casablanca directive of 21 January 1943, according to which the Allied bombers' "Primary object will be the progressive destruction and dislocation of the German military, industrial, and economic system, and the undermining of the morale of the German people to a point where their capacity for armed resistance is fatally weakened" with "The German aircraft industry" being the second of the six primary of objectives, after "German submarine construction yards." The idea was that disrupting the German aircraft production capacity was the best way to reduce German aerial combat potential.

On the other hand, according to McFarland & Newton (1991), Big Week was not primarily a bombing campaign, but a campaign designed to kill Luftwaffe fighters. Two tactical factors made this difficult. First, Luftwaffe fighters avoided Allied fighters and would simply ignore the fighter sweeps. Thus, the Allies could not entice the Luftwaffe fighters to engage. Second, during escort missions, Allied fighters remained in close escort formation with bombers. This tactic limited bomber casualties but it also reduced Allied pursuit and destruction of Luftwaffe fighters. Recognizing these problems, Major General Jimmy Doolittle, commander of Eighth Air Force from the end of 1943, ordered bombing missions of key aircraft factories that the Luftwaffe could not ignore. In addition, the mission of the Allied fighters was altered in emphasis – rather than protection of the bombers, it was attack the Luftwaffe fighters. In effect, the primary purpose of the bombing missions was to bring up the Luftwaffe and the real role of the Allied bombers was to be used and sacrificed as bait. Van Esch (2012) stated: 'However, also to the surprise of Allied analysts, German aircraft industries were still able to increase production of fighter aircraft, even after three years of strategic bombing. In this war of attrition, the number of trained and experienced pilots proved the most decisive factor, though, rather than the availability of fighter aircraft.'

=== Allied order of battle ===
As of 22 February 1944 under the United States Strategic Air Forces in Europe commanded by Lieutenant General Carl Spaatz, the U.S. Eighth Air Force – Major General James H. Doolittle, and Major General Frederick Lewis Anderson

- 2nd Bombardment Division
  - 20th Combat Bombardment Wing
    - 93d Bombardment Group
    - 446th Bombardment Group
    - 448th Bombardment Group
  - 14th Combat Bombardment Wing (second wave)
    - 44th Bombardment Group
    - 392nd Bombardment Group
  - 2nd Combat Bombardment Wing (third wave)
    - 389th Bombardment Group
    - 445th Bombardment Group
    - 453rd Bombardment Group
- 3rd Bombardment Division – Major General Curtis LeMay
  - 333 Boeing B-17 Flying Fortress bombers

There were 981 bomber aircraft available for Operation Argument in total. The B-24 Liberator usually had a crew of ten men, sometimes with an extra navigator. Each bombardment group usually consisted of three squadrons with a total of 36 bombers.

== Operations ==
The Americans flew continuously escorted missions against airframe manufacturing and assembly plants and other targets in numerous German cities including: Leipzig, Brunswick, Gotha, Regensburg, Schweinfurt, Augsburg, Stuttgart and Steyr. In six days, the Eighth Air Force bombers based in England flew more than 3,000 sorties and the Fifteenth Air Force based in Italy more than 500. Together they dropped roughly 10,000 tons of bombs.

Big Week opened with the RAF night attack on Leipzig. Apart from the destruction caused, the German anti-aircraft defenses would still be suffering from fatigue the following day when the USAAF hit.

=== USAAF bomber sorties ===
USAAF bomber sorties during Big Week
Date	USAAF	Theatre	Notes
Sunday; 20 February 1944	8AF	ETO: Strategic operations	Mission 226: The Eighth Air Force begins "Big Week" attacks on German aircraft plants and airfields. Twenty-one bombers and 4 fighters are lost hitting three areas in Germany: 1. 417 B-17 Flying Fortress are dispatched to Leipzig-Mockau Airfield, and aviation industry targets at Heiterblick and Abtnaundorf; 239 hit the primary targets, 37 hit Bernburg (Junkers), 44 hit Oschersleben (AGO, prime Fw 190A subcontractor) and 20 hit other targets of opportunity; they claim 14-5-6 Luftwaffe aircraft; seven B-17s are lost, two damaged beyond repair and 161 damaged; casualties are 7 KIA, 17 WIA and 72 MIA.; 2. 314 B-17s are dispatched to the Tutow Airfield; 105 hit the primary and immediate area, 76 hit Rostock (Heinkel) and 115 hit other targets of opportunity; they claim 15-15-10 Luftwaffe aircraft; 6 B-17s are lost, 1 damaged beyond repair and 37 damaged; casualties are 3 KIA and 60 MIA.; 3. 272 B-24s are dispatched to aviation industry targets at Brunswick, Wilhelmtor and Neupetritor; 76 hit the primary, 87 hit Gotha, 13 hit Oschersleben, 58 hit Helmstedt and 10 hit other targets of opportunity; they claim 36-13-13 Luftwaffe aircraft; 8 B-24s are lost, 3 damaged beyond repair and 37 damaged; casualties are 10 KIA, 10 WIA and 77 MIA.; Missions one and three above are escorted by 94 P-38 Lightnings, 668 Eighth and Ninth Air Force Republic P-47 Thunderbolts and 73 Eighth and Ninth Air Force P-51 Mustangs; they claim 61-7-37 Luftwaffe aircraft; one Lockheed P-38 Lightning, two P-47 Thunderbolts and one P-51 Mustangs are lost, two P-47 Thunderbolts are damaged beyond repair and 4 other aircraft are damaged; casualties are 4 MIA. German losses amount to 10 Messerschmitt Bf 110s destroyed and three damaged with 10 killed and seven wounded. Total losses included 74 Bf 110s, Focke-Wulf Fw 190s and Messerschmitt Bf 109s and a further 29 damaged.
Sunday; 20 February 1944	8AF	ETO	Mission 227: 4 of 5 B-17s drop 200 bundles of leaflets on Tours, Nantes, Brest and Lorient, France at 2123–2200 hours without loss.
Sunday; 20 February 1944	9	ETO: Tactical operations	35 Martin B-26 Marauder medium bombers attack Haamstede Airfield, The Netherlands, as a target of opportunity, after about 100 B-26s abort attacks on other airfields because of weather.
Monday; 21 February 1944	8	ETO: Strategic operations	Mission 228: 3 areas in Germany are targeted with the loss of 16 bombers and 5 fighters: 1. 336 B-17s are dispatched to the Gütersloh, Lippstadt and Werl Airfields; because of thick overcast, 285 hit Achmer, Hopsten, Rheine, Diepholz, Quakenbrück and Bramsche Airfields and the marshaling yards at Coevorden and Lingen; they claim 12-5-8 Luftwaffe aircraft; 8 B-17s are lost, 3 damaged beyond repair and 63 damaged; casualties are 4 KIA, 13 WIA and 75 MIA.; 2. 281 B-17s are dispatched to Diepholz Airfield and Brunswick; 175 hit the primaries and 88 hit Ahlhorn and Vörden Airfields and Hannover; they claim 2-5-2 Luftwaffe aircraft; five B-17s are lost, three damaged beyond repair and 36 damaged; casualties are 20 KIA, 4 WIA and 57 MIA.; 3. 244 B-24s are dispatched to Achmer and Handorf Airfields; 11 hit Achmer Airfield and 203 hit Diepholz, Verden and Hesepe Airfields and Lingen; they claim 5-6-4 Luftwaffe aircraft; 3 B-24s are lost, 1 damaged beyond repair and 6 damaged; casualties are three WIA and 31 MIA.; Escort for Mission 228 is provided by 69 P-38s, 542 Eighth and Ninth Air Force P-47s and 68 Eighth and Ninth Air Force P-51s; the P-38s claim 0-1-0 Luftwaffe aircraft, 1 P-38 is damaged beyond repair; the P-47s claim 19-3-14 Luftwaffe aircraft, two P-47s are lost, two are damaged beyond repair, three are damaged and two pilots are MIA; the P-51s claim 14-1-4 Luftwaffe aircraft, three P-51s are lost and the pilots are MIA. German losses were 30 Bf 109s and Fw 190s, 24 pilots killed and seven wounded. Mission 229: 5 of 5 B-17s drop 250 bundles of leaflets on Rouen, Caen, Paris and Amiens, France at 2215–2327 hours without loss.
Monday; 21 February 1944	9	ETO: Tactical operations	18 B-26s bomb Coxyde Airfield, Belgium; weather causes almost 190 aborts. The Ninth Air Force's Pathfinder Squadron (provisionally activated on 13 February) takes part in this operation, its first venture into combat. 185 aircraft scheduled to attack other airfields in the Netherlands and France in the afternoon are recalled because of bad weather.
Tuesday; 22 February 1944	8	ETO: Strategic operations	VIII Bomber Command is redesignated as the Eighth Air Force.
Tuesday; 22 February 1944	8	ETO: Strategic operations	Further information: Bombing of Nijmegen Mission 230: "Big Week" continues with 799 aircraft dispatched against German aviation and Luftwaffe airfields; 41 bombers and 11 fighters are lost.: 1. 289 B-17s are dispatched against aviation industry targets at Aschersleben (34 bomb), Bernburg (47 bomb) and Halberstadt (18 bomb) in conjunction with a Fifteenth Air Force raid on Regensburg, Germany; 32 hit Bünde, 19 hit Wernigerode, 15 hit Magdeburg, 9 hit Marburg and 7 hit other targets of opportunity; they claim 32-18-17 Luftwaffe aircraft; 38 B-17s are lost, 4 damaged beyond repair and 141 damaged; casualties are 35 KIA, 30 WIA and 367 MIA.; 2. 333 B-17s are dispatched to Schweinfurt but severe weather prevents aircraft from forming properly and they are forced to abandon the mission prior to crossing the enemy coast; 2 B-17s are damaged.; 3. 177 B-24s are dispatched but they are recalled when 100 miles (160 km) inland; since they were over Germany, they sought targets of opportunity but strong winds drove the bombers over The Netherlands and their bombs hit Enschede, Arnhem, Nijmegen and Deventer; they claim 2-0-0 Luftwaffe aircraft; 3 B-24s are lost and 3 damaged; casualties are 30 MIA. About 900 civilians were killed, mainly in the bombing of Nijmegen. In 1984, the book De Fatale Aanval ("The Fatal Attack"), was written about this by eyewitness Alphons Brinkhuis, who was a 10-year-old boy at Enschede when it happened.; These missions are escorted by 67 P-38s, 535 Eighth and Ninth Air Force P-47s, and 57 Eighth and Ninth Air Force P-51s; the P-38s claim 1 Luftwaffe aircraft destroyed, 1 P-38 is damaged beyond repair and 6 are damaged; the P-47s claim 39-6-15 Luftwaffe aircraft, 8 P-47s are lost and 12 damaged, 8 pilots are MIA; the P-51s claim 19-1-10 Luftwaffe aircraft, 3 P-51s are lost and 3 damaged, 3 pilots are MIA.
Tuesday; 22 February 1944	9	ETO	66 B-26s bomb Gilze-Rijen Airfield, The Netherlands; bad weather causes 100+ others to abort.
Tuesday; 22 February 1944	15AF	MTO:Strategic operations	B-17s attack Petershausen marshaling yard and Regensburg aircraft factory in Germany and the air depot at Zagreb, Yugoslavia; a large force of B-24s hits Regensburg aircraft plants about the same time as the B-17 attack; other B-24s pound the town of Sibenik and the harbor at Zara, Yugoslavia; they claim 40 Luftwaffe aircraft destroyed; 13 bombers are lost.
Wednesday; 23 February 1944	8	ETO: Strategic operations	Mission 232: 5 of 5 B-17s drop 250 bundles of leaflets on Rennes, Le Mans, Chartres, Lille and Orleans, France at 21:36–22:32 hours without loss.
Wednesday; 23 February 1944	15	MTO:Strategic operations	B-24s bomb the industrial complex at Steyr, Austria. Other heavy bombers are forced to abort because of bad weather; the bombers and escorting fighters claim 30+ aircraft shot down.
Thursday; 24 February 1944	8	ETO	Missions 237, 238 and 239 are flown against targets in France; 7 B-17s are lost. Heavy clouds cause over half the bombers dispatched to return without bombing.
Thursday; 24 February 1944	8	ETO	Mission 237: 49 of 81 B-24s hit the Ecalles sur Buchy V-weapon sites; 1 B-24 is damaged. Escort is provided by 61 P-47s.
Thursday; 24 February 1944	8	ETO	Mission 238: 258 B-17s are dispatched against V-weapon sites in the Pas de Calais; 109 hit the primary target, 10 hit a road junction E of Yerville, 7 hit a rail siding SW of Abbeville and 6 hit targets of opportunity; 7 B-17s are lost and 75 damaged; casualties are 5 WIA and 63 MIA. Escort is provided by 81 P-38s, 94 P-47s and 22 P-51s; 1 P-38 is damaged beyond repair; the P-51s claim a single German aircraft on the ground.
Thursday; 24 February 1944	8	ETO	Mission 239: 5 of 5 B-17s drop 250 bundles of leaflets on Amiens, Rennes, Paris, Rouen and Le Mans, France at 2023–2055 hours without loss.
Thursday; 24 February 1944	9	ETO	180 B-26s attack 'NOBALL' (V-weapon) targets and Rosieres-en-Santerre, France. Bad weather makes bombing difficult and causes 34 other B-26s to abort.
Friday; 25 February 1944	8	ETO	Mission 235: In the final "Big Week" mission, 4 targets in Germany are hit; 31 bombers and 3 fighters are lost.: 1. 268 B-17s are dispatched to aviation industry targets at Augsburg and the industrial area at Stuttgart; 196 hit Augsburg and targets of opportunity and 50 hit Stuttgart; they claim 8-4-4 Luftwaffe aircraft; 13 B-17s are lost and 172 damaged; casualties are 12 WIA and 130 MIA.; 2. 267 of 290 B-17s hit aviation industry targets at Regensburg and targets of opportunity; they claim 13-1-7 Luftwaffe aircraft; 12 B-17s are lost, 1 damaged beyond repair and 82 damaged; casualties are 4 KIA, 12 WIA and 110 MIA.; 3. 172 of 196 B-24s hit aviation industry targets at Furth and targets of opportunity; they claim 2-2-2 Luftwaffe aircraft; 6 B-24s are lost, 2 damaged beyond repair and 44 damaged; casualties are 2 WIA and 61 MIA.; Escort is provided by 73 P-38s, 687 Eighth and Ninth Air Force P-47s and 139 Eighth and Ninth Air Force P-51s; the P-38s claim 1-2-0 Luftwaffe aircraft, 1 P-38 is damaged beyond repair; the P-47s claim 13-2-10 Luftwaffe aircraft, 1 P-47 is lost and 6 damaged, 1 pilot is MIA; the P-51s claim 12-0-3 Luftwaffe aircraft, 2 P-51s are lost and 1 damaged beyond repair, 2 pilots are MIA. Mission 236: 5 of 5 B-17s drop 250 bundles of leaflets on Grenoble, Toulouse, Chartres, Caen and Raismes, France at 2129–2335 hours without loss.
Friday; 25 February 1944	9	ETO: Tactical operations	191 B-26s bomb Venlo, Saint-Trond, and Cambrai/Epinoy Airfields, France in a morning raid as a diversion in support of the VIII Bomber Command heavy bombers over Germany; 36 abort, mainly because of a navigational error. 164 B-26s dispatched against military targets in France during the afternoon are recalled because of bad weather.
Friday; 25 February 1944	9	MTO: Strategic operations	Continuing coordinated attacks with the Eighth Air Force on European targets, B-17s with fighter escorts pound Regensburg aircraft factory; enemy fighter opposition is heavy. Other B-17s hit the air depot at Klagenfurt, Austria and the dock area at Pola, Italy. B-24s attack Fiume, Italy marshaling yard and port and hit Zell-am-See, Austria railroad and Graz airfield and the port area at Zara, Yugoslavia; 30+ US aircraft are lost; they claim 90+ fighters shot down.

=== RAF bomber sorties ===
RAF Bomber Command directly contributed to the attacks on the aircraft industry in Schweinfurt. Some 734 bombers were dispatched on the night of 24/25 February, and 695 reported they struck the target. However, analysis of the photographs taken during the raid showed that only 298 of the aircraft dropped their bombs within three miles of the aiming point. Of these, only 22 hit inside the target area; that is, they came down within the boundaries of the built-up districts of the city. Little damage was done due to creepback: marker aircraft dropped markers short, and bombers dropped their payload at the first markers seen rather than at the center of the markers.

On 25/26 February 1944, Bomber Command sent almost 600 aircraft to the aircraft assembly plant at Augsburg. This time, the markers were dropped accurately, the attack was accurate and destroyed about 60 percent of the industrial city.

RAF Bomber Command night-time sorties during Big Week
Date	Notes
19/20 February 1944	921 sorties, 79 aircraft (8.6%) lost. The major raid, by 823 aircraft (561 Avro Lancasters, 255 Handley Page Halifaxes and seven de Havilland Mosquitos), was to Leipzig; (B-17s of the US VIII bombed Leipzig-Mockau Airfield earlier the same day) but it suffered as most of the fighters had not been drawn off by a diversion raid laying mines off Kiel. In support of the main raid de Havilland Mosquitos bombed nightfighter airfields in the Netherlands and a further 15 made a diversionary raid on Berlin. The earlier variant of Halifaxes used on this raid suffered high losses and were removed from operations over Germany afterwards.
20/21 February	826 sorties, 10 aircraft (1.2%) lost. The major raid, by 598 aircraft, was to Stuttgart; (50 B-17s of the US VIII bombed Stuttgart industrial areas on Friday, 25 February).
21/22 February	17 Mosquitos to Duisburg, Stuttgart and two flying-bomb sites with other sorties. Including mine-laying operations, total effort for the night was 69 sorties, with 1 mine-laying aircraft (1.4%) lost.
22/23 February	10 Mosquitos to Stuttgart, 8 to Duisburg and 3 to Aachen with other sorties the total effort for the night was 134 sorties, no aircraft lost.
23/24 February	17 Mosquitos of 692 Squadron to Düsseldorf, with other sorties the total effort for the night 22 sorties, no aircraft lost.
24/25 February	1,070 sorties, 36 aircraft (3.4%) lost including two aircraft minelaying and one Serrate radar detector-equipped Mosquito. (Note: The Serrate system allowed British night-fighters on "intruder" missions to hunt German radar-equipped nightfighters) The major raid, by 734 aircraft split into two attacks, was on Schweinfurt, home of Germany's main ball-bearing factories. American B-17s had bombed the factories the previous day. At the same time there were diversionary raids and misdirections: 15 Mosquitos bombed airfields in the Netherlands, 8 Mosquitos bombed Kiel and 7 Aachen. The diversions and splitting the raid in two kept bomber losses down.

== Analysis ==
=== Allied losses ===
During Big Week, the Eighth Air Force lost 97 B-17s, 40 B-24s and another 20 scrapped due to damage. The operational strength of the Eighth Air Force bomber units had dropped from 75 percent at the start of the week to 54 percent, and its fighter units strength had dropped from 72 percent of establishment strength to 65 percent. The Fifteenth Air Force lost 14.6 percent (90 bombers) of establishment strength, and RAF Bomber Command lost 131 bombers (5.7 percent) during Big Week. Although these numbers are high in absolute terms, the numbers of bombers involved in the missions were much higher than previously, and the losses represented a much smaller percentage of the attacking force. The earlier Schweinfurt missions had cost the force nearly 30 percent of their aircraft per mission.

=== German losses ===
German losses were 262 fighters, 250 aircrew killed or injured, including nearly 100 pilots killed in action. US aircrews claimed more than 500 German fighters destroyed, though the numbers were exaggerated by 40% compared with actual numbers. The Luftwaffe losses were high amongst their twin-engined Zerstörer units, and the Bf 110 and Me 410 groups were severely depleted. More worrying for the Jagdwaffe (fighter force) than the loss of 355 aircraft was the loss of nearly 100 pilots (14 percent) who had been killed. In contrast to the raids of the previous year, the US losses were replaceable, while the Germans were already hard pressed due to the war in the East. Although not fatal, Big Week was an extremely worrying development for the Germans. The lack of skilled pilots due to an attrition in the three-front war was the factor eroding the capability of the Jagdwaffe. According to McFarland & Newton (1991), the purported Allied strategy of sacrificing bombers in order to lure and kill Luftwaffe fighters was very effective. Freed of close bomber escort duty, Allied fighters, particularly the P-51s, inflicted severe losses on the Luftwaffe. German aircraft and pilot losses could not be sufficiently replaced. As a result, the Allies achieved air superiority by the time of the D-Day invasion.

=== Bombing results ===
The damage to the German aircraft industry was fairly limited. During 1944, German fighter aircraft production continued to increase, and actually peaked, by dispersing production and reducing the production of other aircraft types.

- 20 February: The 3rd Bombardment Division failed to reach its target, the Tutow complex, due to long-hanging clouds. It attacked its secondary target Rostock instead. The 1st and 2nd Bombardment Divisions also failed to find their objectives, and bombed other places instead.
- 21 February: None of the 924 bombers who had departed hit their original targets, but diverted to other targets instead.
- 22 February: 252 B-24s were readied for combat, but due to various formation problems, only 177 took off, and only 74 saw combat action. During formation, several accidents occurred resulting in crashes and the deaths of dozens of crew members. Because of this, and the fact that low-hanging clouds were reported across central Germany, none of the 333 Boeing B-17 Flying Fortress bombers of the 3rd Bombardment Division reached their targets, as all of them were recalled early to prevent disaster. The remaining B-24s received the order to return to England much later, and efforts to turn the formation around caused chaos and fragmenting; on the way back to base, they looked for targets of opportunity, and eventually the Dutch cities of Nijmegen, Arnhem, Deventer and Enschede were selected and attacked. Approximately 880 civilians were killed in the disorderly Bombing of Nijmegen, while the actual target of opportunity, Nijmegen railway station (used for German arms transport), was barely damaged. In Enschede, 40 civilians were killed, 41 were injured, and hundreds of homes destroyed, causing 700 civilians to become homeless; the likely target of opportunity, in the middle of a residential area, was a small factory producing components for German missiles. In Arnhem, 57 civilians were killed and 86 homes destroyed, affecting 464 families in the residential areas of Rijnwijk and Malburgen; the target of opportunity was the Arnhem Rubber Factory (Arufa) on industrial terrain Het Broek, whose production capacity was largely in service of the German war effort.
- 23 February: All operations were suspended due to bad weather and for investigating operational failures during the previous day, especially the Bombing of Nijmegen.
- 24/25 February: RAF conducted an attack on the aircraft industry in Schweinfurt, doing little damage.
- 25/26 February 1944: RAF carried out an accurate attack on Augsburg, destroying some 60 percent of the industrial city.

== Aftermath ==
Although the Allied goal of achieving air superiority was furthered, the Allied bombing of the German aircraft industry was ineffective. Moreover, the Allied losses were more severe than the German losses. On top of that, the high Dutch civilian death toll was a humanitarian catastrophe.

=== Humanitarian impact ===
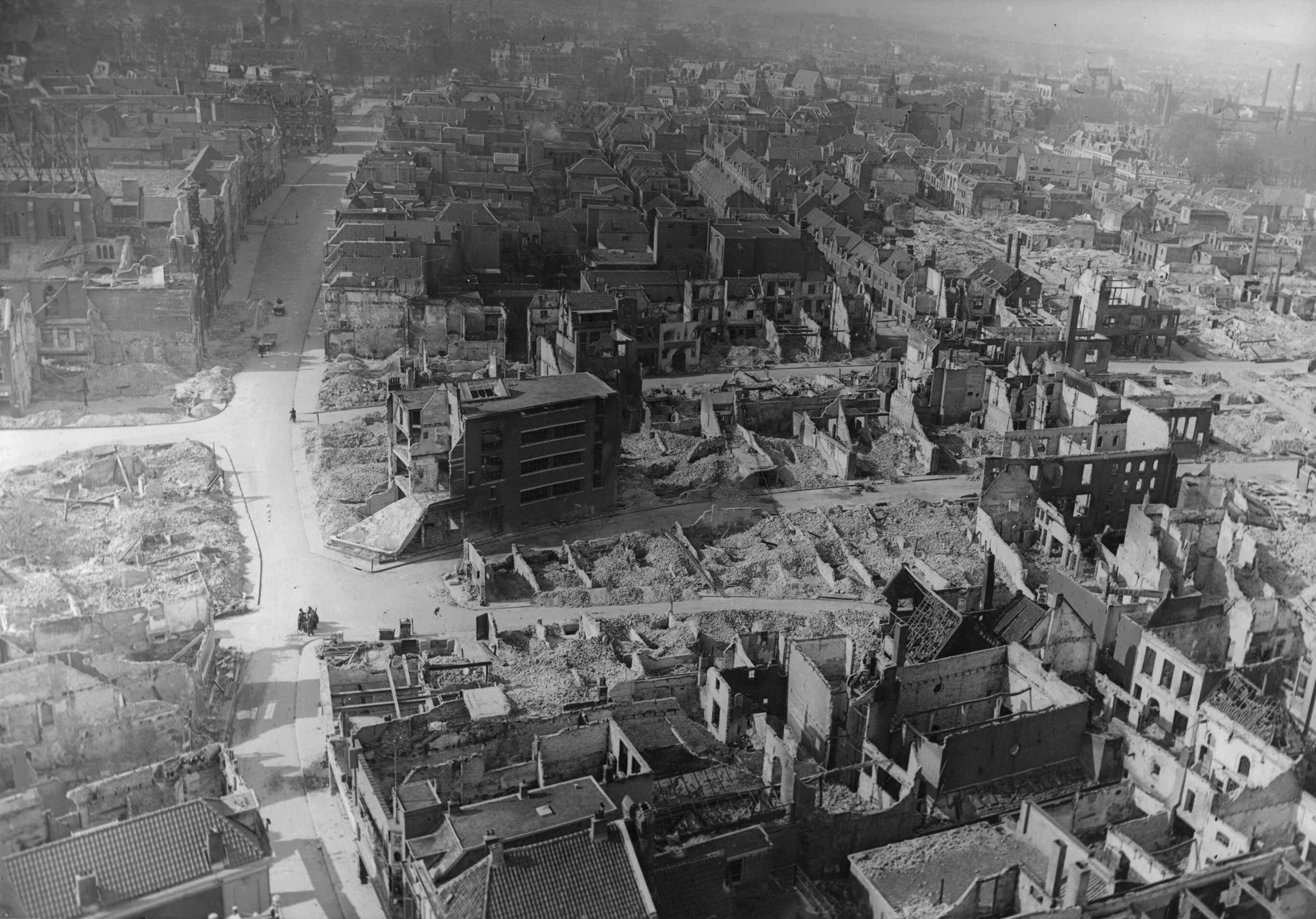
Damage to Nijmegen after the 22 February Bombing of Nijmegen

The bombing of Nijmegen on 22 February, which resulted from the aborted attack on the Gothaer Waggonfabrik, was a disaster in terms of barely damaging any targets of military importance while killing hundreds of civilians of the Netherlands (approximately 880 civilian deaths in Nijmegen), whose government-in-exile in London was part of the Allied coalition. On the day after the raid, 23 February, the Allied air force launched an investigation: all air raids planned for that day were canceled (also due to poor weather conditions), and all flyers and briefing officers involved were held on the base and questioned. In London, a diplomatic incident occurred between the American, British and Dutch military and civilian commanders and officials about what had happened, who should be granted access to which information, and in which order, and who should ultimately be held responsible, creating distrust within the Allied leadership for some time. The American military command was relatively late in drawing lessons from the disorderly air raid, which had struck an ally's civilian population hard. Not until mid-May 1944, orders were given to seek out targets of opportunity at least 30 kilometers away from the Netherlands' border. Nazi German propaganda attempted to exploit the tragedy in order to counter pro-Allied sympathies amongst the Dutch civilian population, but these efforts appear to have been ineffective, and perhaps even counterproductive.

Brinkhuis (1984) stated that several Allied actions during Operation Argument allowed the Allies to achieve air superiority, which would make subsequent bombing raids less risky and chaotic, and more effective. The tragic failures of the 22 February bombings of Dutch cities no one had ever heard of, which had resulted in almost a thousand civilian casualties and major infrastructural damage, were initially brushed off as an 'incident', and Operation Argument would be glorified as 'Big Week' in Allied historiography.

=== Military impact ===
Otherwise, Big Week bolstered the confidence of US strategic bombing crews. Until that time, Allied bombers avoided contact with the Luftwaffe; now, the Americans used any method that would force the Luftwaffe into combat. Implementing this policy, the United States looked toward Berlin. Raiding the German capital, Allied leaders reasoned, would force the Luftwaffe to battle. On March 4, the USSTAF launched the first of several attacks against Berlin. A force of 730 bombers set off from England with an escort of 800 fighters. Fierce battles raged and resulted in heavy losses for both sides; 69 B-17s were lost but it cost the Luftwaffe 160 aircraft. The Allies, again, replaced their losses; the Luftwaffe, again, could not.

The new German tactics of using Sturmböcke (heavily armed Fw 190s) as bomber destroyers and Bf 109Gs to escort them in Gefechtsverband formations were proving somewhat effective. The US fighters, kept in close contact with the bombers they were protecting, could not chase the attacking fighters before they were forced to turn around and return to the bombers. General Doolittle responded by initiating a breakthrough in fighter tactics by "freeing" the fighters, allowing them to fly far ahead of the heavy bomber formations in an air supremacy "fighter sweep" mode on the outward legs; then following the USAAF heavies' bomb runs, the fighters roamed far from the bomber streams and hunted down German fighters – especially the Sturmböcke, that had limited maneuverability with their heavy underwing conformal gun pod-mount autocannons – before they could ever approach the USAAF bombers. Though the change was unpopular with the bomber crews, its effects were immediate and extremely effective.

The Combined Bomber Offensive attacks against fighter production officially ended on 1 April 1944, and control of the air forces passed to US General Dwight D. Eisenhower in preparation for the invasion of France. The combined heavy bomber forces were now used in the Transport Plan destroying railway supply lines to and within France to reduce German capacity to respond to invasion on the French coast. Allied airmen were well on the way to achieving air superiority over all of Europe. Russell (1999) stated: "While they continued strategic bombing, the USAAF turned its attention to the tactical air battle in support of the Normandy invasion". According to Kenneth P. Werell (1986), the battle for air superiority was very costly for both sides, but by 1 April 1944, the Allies had gained the upper hand.

== See also ==
- Operation Steinbock, the German "baby blitz" against the UK, that was ongoing simultaneously with the "Big Week" campaign and afterwards.

== Bibliography ==
Monographs

- Brinkhuis, Alfons (1984). De Fatale Aanval 22 februari 1944. Opzet of vergissing? De waarheid over de mysterieuze Amerikaanse bombardementen op Nijmegen, Arnhem, Enschede en Deventer [The Fatal Attack February 22, 1944. Intent or mistake? The truth about the mysterious American bombing of Nijmegen, Arnhem, Enschede and Deventer] (in Dutch). Weesp: Gooise Uitgeverij. p. 147. ISBN 978-907323201-3.
- Caldwell, Donald L.; Muller, Richard R. (2007). The Luftwaffe over Germany: Defense of the Reich. London, UK: Greenhill Books. ISBN 978-1-85367-712-0.
- Hall, Cargill R. (1998). Case Studies In Strategic Bombardment. Air Force History and Museums Program. Washington: Government Print. ISBN 0-16-049781-7.
- Hess, William. N. (1994). B-17 Flying Fortress - Combat and Development History. Motor books. ISBN 0-87938-881-1.

Journals

- Harvey, Arnold D (Spring 2012). "The Battle of Britain in 1940 and "Big Week," in 1944: A Comparative Perspective". Air Power History. 59 (1).
- van Esch, Joris A. C. (2012). "Restrained Policy and Careless Execution: Allied Strategic Bombing on the Netherlands in the Second World War". War & Society. 31 (3). Informa UK Ltd: 244–63. doi:10.1179/0729247312z.00000000012. ISSN 0729-2473.
