= Hubert-Folie =

- Part of Castine-en-Plaine
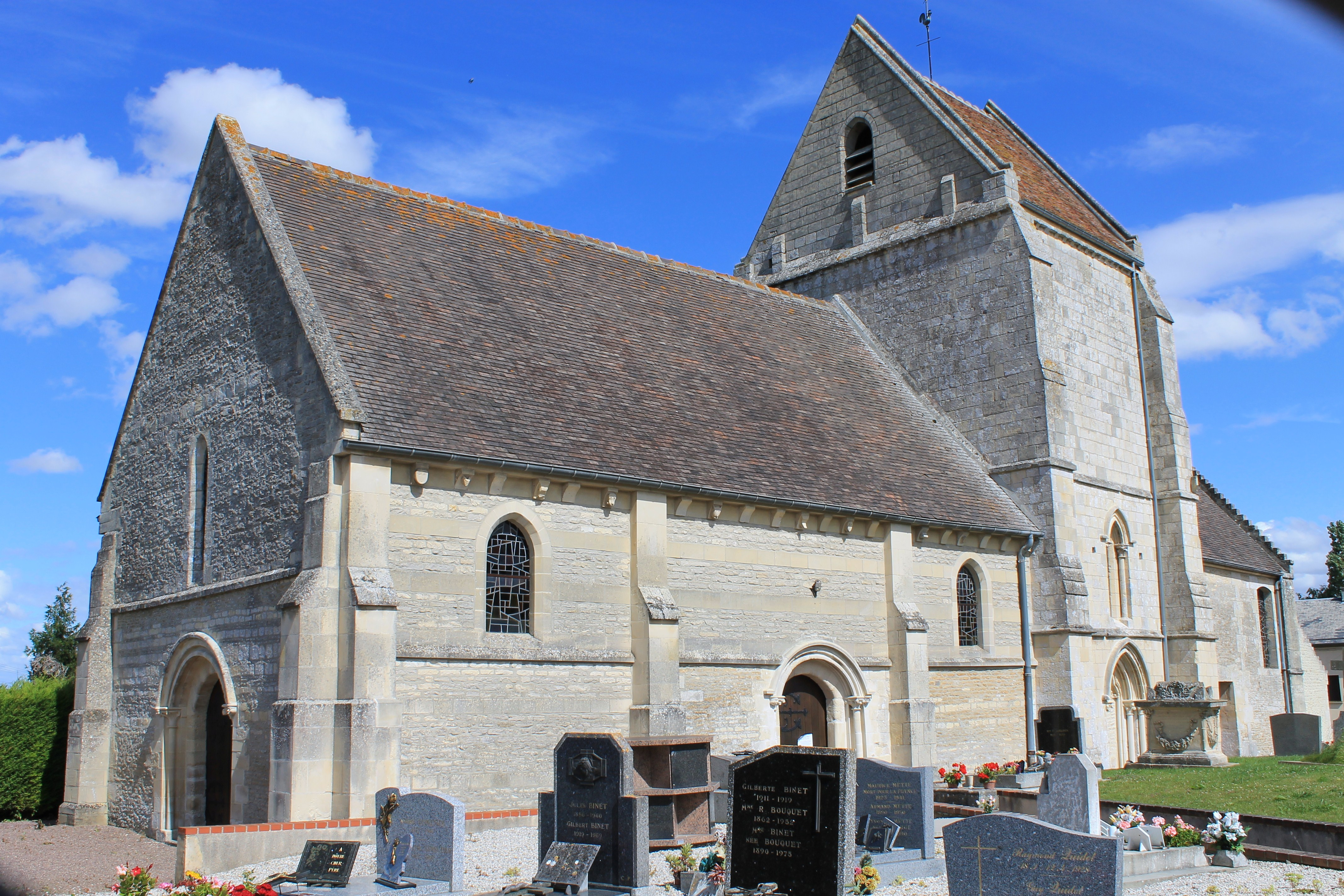
- The church in Hubert-Folie
- Location of Hubert-Folie
- Location within France Location within Normandy
- Coordinates: 49°07′47″N 0°18′49″W
- Country: France
- Region: Normandy
- Department: Calvados
- Arrondissement: Caen
- Canton: Évrecy
- Commune: Castine-en-Plaine
- Area^{1}: 1.93 km^{2} (0.75 sq mi)
- Elevation: 50 m (160 ft)
- Highest elevation: 65 m (213 ft)
- Lowest elevation: 29 m (95 ft)
- Population (2023): 421
  - Density: 218/km^{2} (565/sq mi)
- Time zone: UTC+01:00 (CET)
  - Summer (DST): UTC+02:00 (CEST)
- Postal code: 14540
- ^{1} French Land Register data, which excludes lakes, ponds, glaciers > 1 km^{2} (0.386 sq mi or 247 acres) and river estuaries.

Hubert-Folie (French pronunciation: [ybɛʁ fɔli]) is a former commune in the Calvados department in the Normandy region in northwestern France. On 1 January 2019, it was merged into the new commune Castine-en-Plaine.

== See also ==
- Communes of the Calvados department
