= Castine-en-Plaine =

- Commune
- Location of Castine-en-Plaine
- Location within France Location within Normandy
- Coordinates: 49°05′43″N 0°19′16″W
- Country: France
- Region: Normandy
- Department: Calvados
- Arrondissement: Caen
- Canton: Évrecy
- Intercommunality: CU Caen la Mer

Government
  - Mayor (2020–2026): Florence Bouchard
- Area^{1}: 8.23 km^{2} (3.18 sq mi)
- Highest elevation: 92 m (302 ft)
- Lowest elevation: 29 m (95 ft)
- Population (2023): 1,774
  - Density: 216/km^{2} (558/sq mi)
- Time zone: UTC+01:00 (CET)
  - Summer (DST): UTC+02:00 (CEST)
- INSEE/Postal code: 14538 /14540
- ^{1} French Land Register data, which excludes lakes, ponds, glaciers > 1 km^{2} (0.386 sq mi or 247 acres) and river estuaries.

Castine-en-Plaine (French pronunciation: [kastin ɑ̃ plɛn], literally Limestone in Plain) is a commune in the Calvados department in northwestern France. The municipality was established on 1 January 2019 by merger of the former communes of Hubert-Folie, Rocquancourt and Tilly-la-Campagne.

== Geography ==
The commune is made up of the following collection of villages and hamlets, Hubert-Folie, Rocquancourt and Castine-en-Plaine.

== Points of Interest ==
=== National Heritage sites ===
- Église Notre-Dame twelfth century church listed as a Monument historique in 1932.

== See also ==
- Communes of the Calvados department
