= Rocquancourt =

- Part of Castine-en-Plaine
- A general view of Rocquancourt
- Location of Rocquancourt
- Location within France Location within Normandy
- Coordinates: 49°05′43″N 0°19′16″W
- Country: France
- Region: Normandy
- Department: Calvados
- Arrondissement: Caen
- Canton: Évrecy
- Commune: Castine-en-Plaine
- Area^{1}: 2.75 km^{2} (1.06 sq mi)
- Highest elevation: 92 m (302 ft)
- Lowest elevation: 68 m (223 ft)
- Population (2022): 1,072
  - Density: 390/km^{2} (1,010/sq mi)
- Time zone: UTC+01:00 (CET)
  - Summer (DST): UTC+02:00 (CEST)
- Postal code: 14540
- ^{1} French Land Register data, which excludes lakes, ponds, glaciers > 1 km^{2} (0.386 sq mi or 247 acres) and river estuaries.

Rocquancourt (French pronunciation: [ʁɔkɑ̃kuʁ]) is a former commune in the Calvados department in the Normandy region in northwestern France. On 1 January 2019, it was merged into the new commune Castine-en-Plaine.

== Population ==
Historical population
Year	Pop.	±% p.a.
1962	440	—
1968	506	+2.36%
1975	503	−0.08%
1982	530	+0.75%
1990	519	−0.26%
1999	581	+1.26%
2006	684	+2.36%
2022	1,072	+2.85%
Source: EHESS and INSEE

== Gallery ==
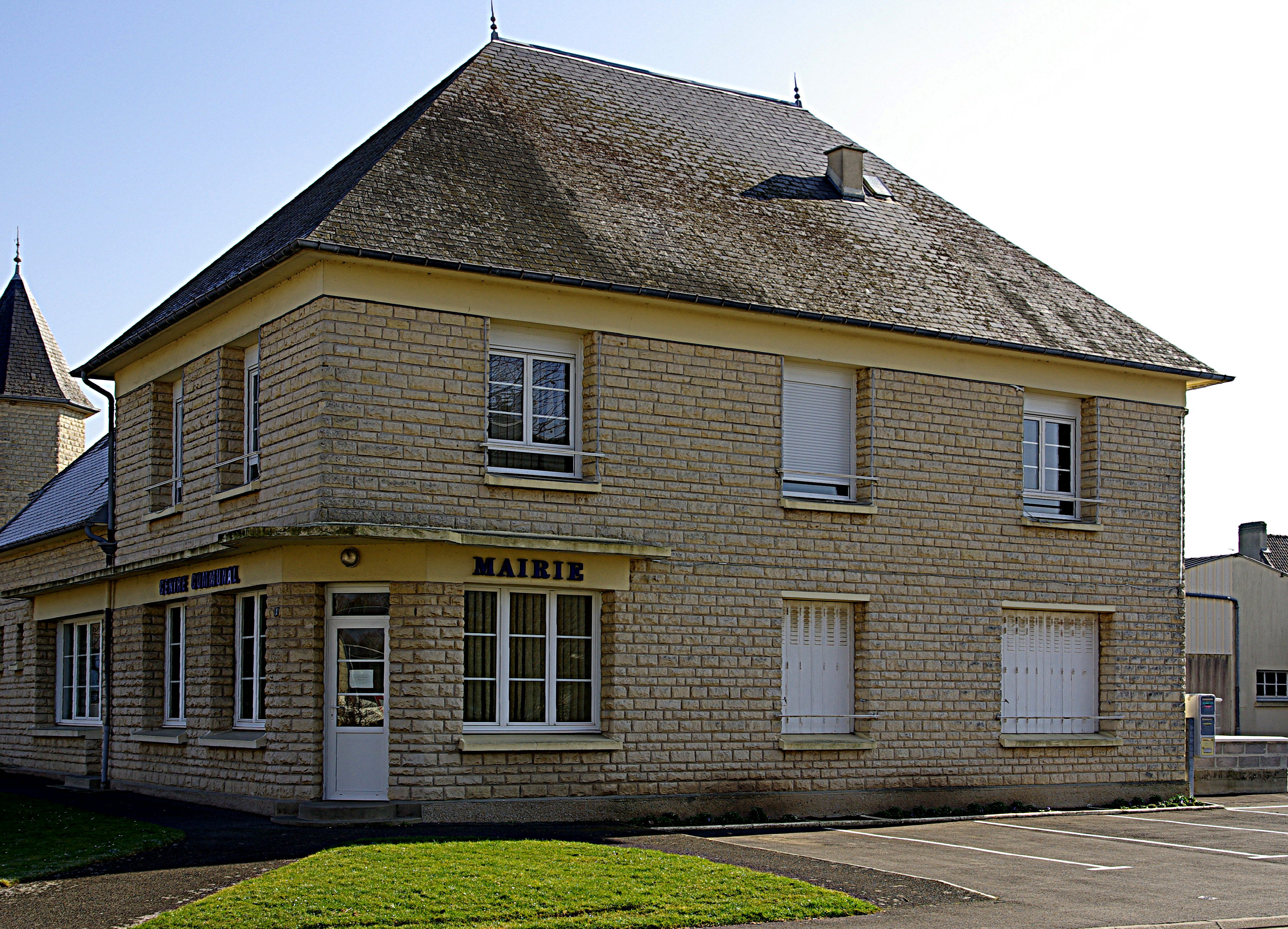
Town hall

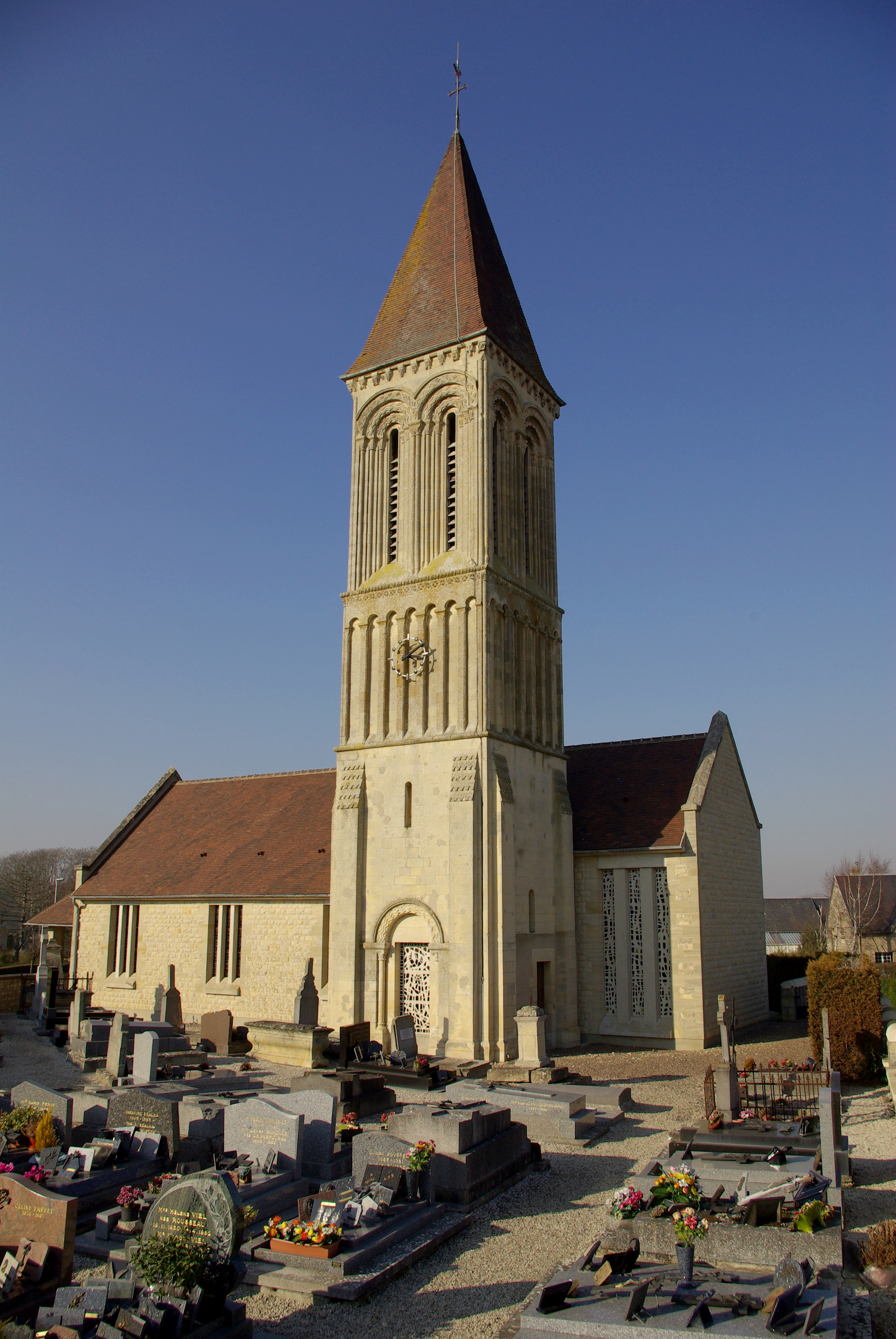
St. Martin

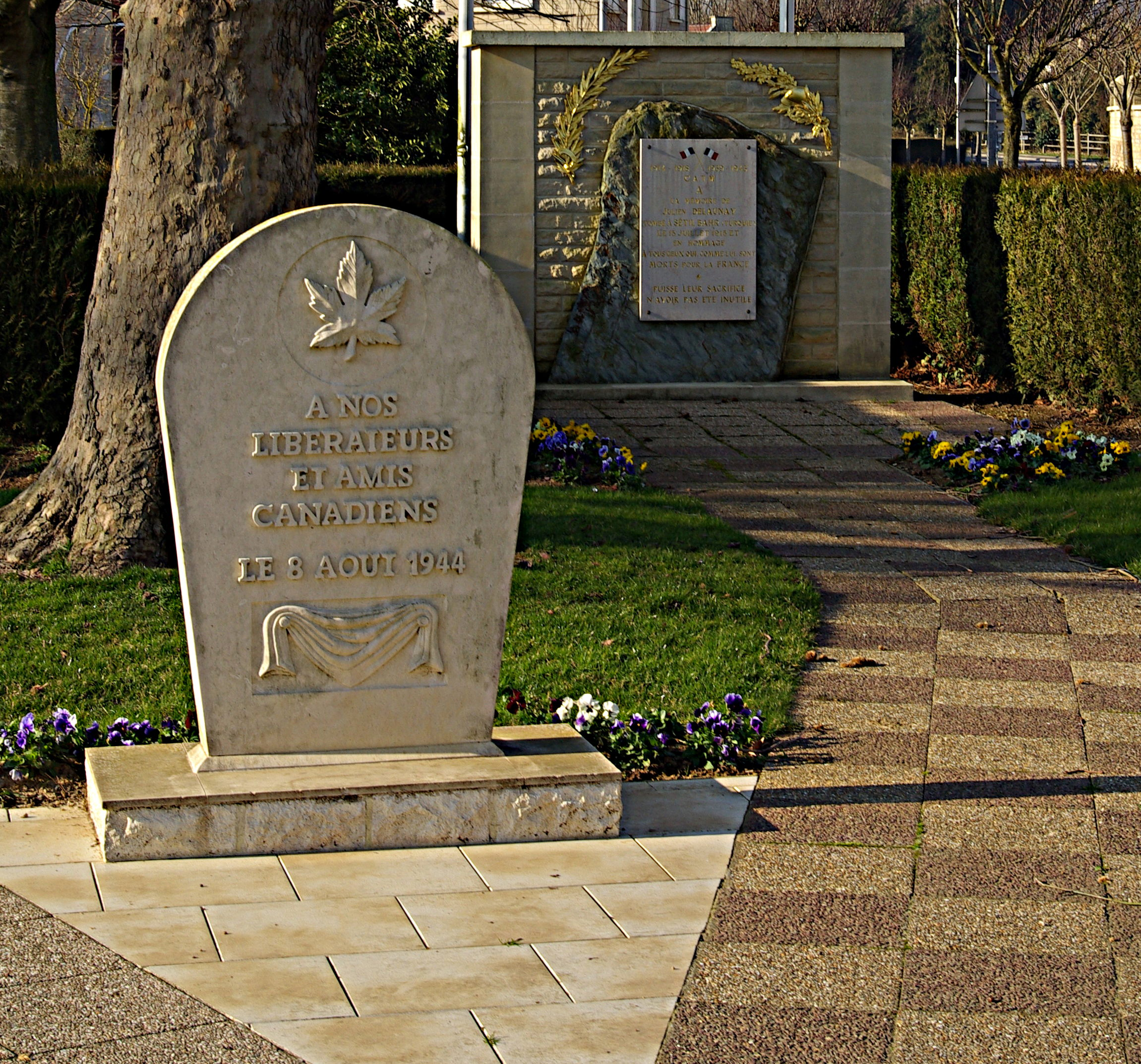
War memorial

== See also ==
- Communes of the Calvados department
