= Bombing of Normandy =

1944 Allied aerial bombing in France during World War II

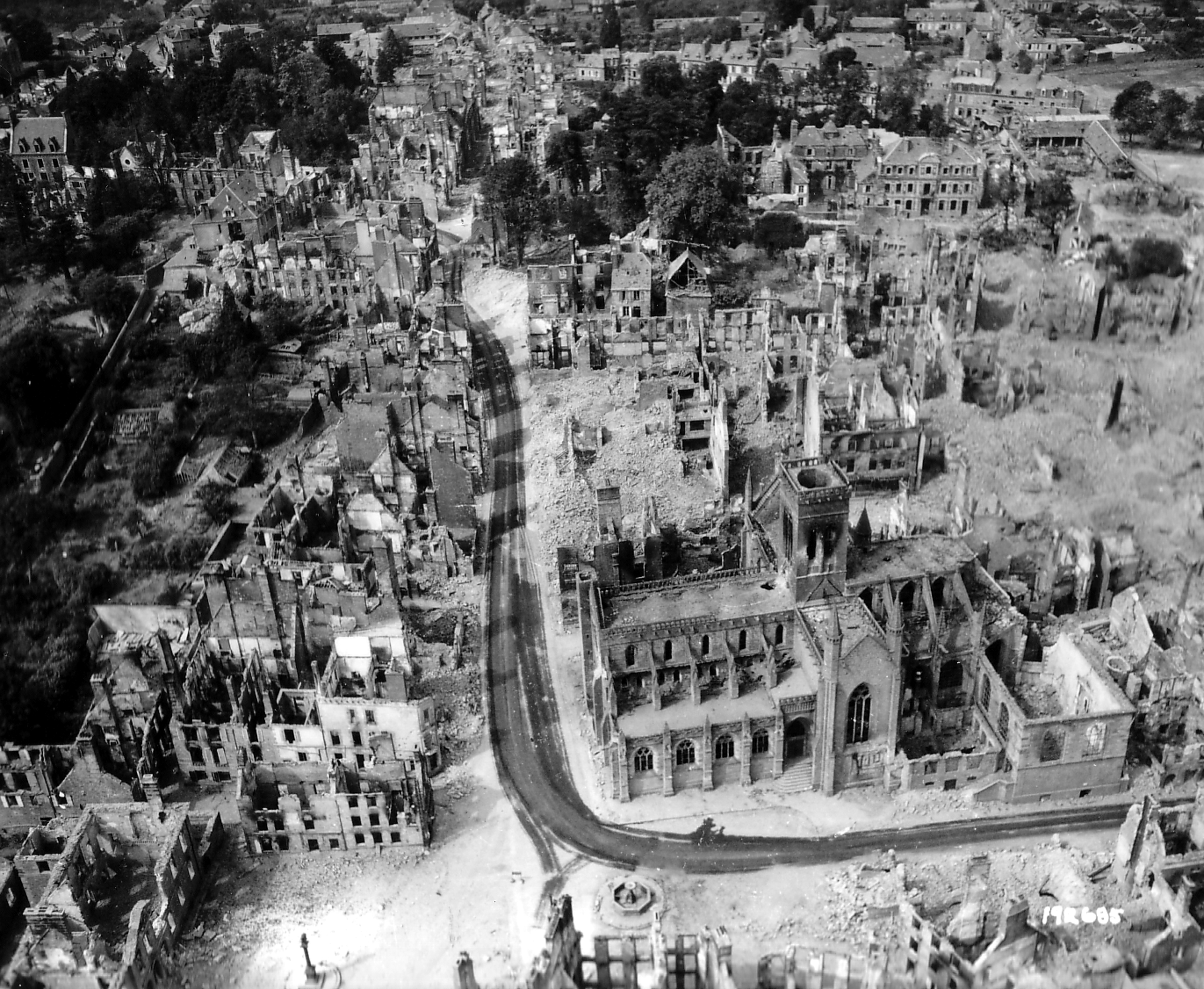
Aerial view after the bombardment in Vire, Normandy, 1944

The Bombing of Normandy during the Normandy invasion was meant to destroy the German communication lines in the Norman cities and towns. However, few German soldiers occupied these municipalities, who were mostly located elsewhere. On 9 July 1944, Field Marshal Bernard Montgomery ordered a massive air assault against Caen in the hopes of clearing the way for a ground attack the following morning. Four hundred and fifty heavy aircraft participated, dropping 2,500 tons of bombs. The pilots however negated most of the effect by releasing their bomb loads well back from the front line to avoid hitting their own troops. As a result, the city incurred heavy damage but German defenses went largely unscathed.

Allied heavy bomber missions caused serious problems for both Allied ground forces and French civilians, during the early stages of the campaign. Sometimes Allied troops were hit by friendly fire from bombing raids. In the early stages of the Normandy campaign, this often resulted from insufficient communication between air and land forces. US General Omar Bradley remarked after the war that We went into France almost totally untrained in air-ground cooperation."

The first two bombing raids on Caen resulted in many French civilian casualties. According to Antony Beevor in his book D-Day,

The British bombing of Caen beginning on D-Day in particular was stupid, counter-productive and above all very close to a war crime. There was an assumption, I think, that Caen must have been evacuated beforehand. That was wishful thinking on the part of the British. There were more than 2,000 casualties there on the first two days and in a way it was miraculous that more people weren't killed when you think of the bombing and the shelling which carried on for days afterwards. French civilians, caught in the middle of these battlefields or under Allied bombing, endured terrible suffering. Even the joys of liberation had their darker side. The war in northern France marked not just a generation, but the whole of the postwar world, profoundly influencing relations between America and Europe.

The bombings destroyed 96% of Tilly-la-Campagne (Calvados), 95% of Vire (Calvados), 88% of Villers-Bocage (Calvados), 82% of Le Havre (Seine-Maritime), 77% of Saint-Lô (Manche), 76% of Falaise (Calvados), 75% of Lisieux (Calvados), 75% of Caen (Calvados).

It is estimated that the bombings in Normandy before and after D-Day caused over 20,000 civilian deaths. The French historian Henri Amouroux in La Grande histoire des Français sous l’Occupation, says that 20,000 civilians were killed in Calvados department, 10,000 in Seine-Maritime, 14,800 in the Manche, 4,200 in the Orne, around 3,000 in the Eure. The deadliest Allied bombing raids in Normandy whilst it was under the German occupation were: Lisieux (6–7 June 1944, 700 dead), Vire (6–7 June 1944, 400 dead), Caen (6 June–19 July 1944, about 3,000 dead), Le Havre (5–11 September 1944, more than 5,000 dead)

Although liberation from German occupation was welcomed by French civilians in Normandy, for some who lived through the war, it was the arrival and passage of British and American forces that was the most traumatizing experience. According to Christophe Prime, "It was profoundly traumatic for the people of Normandy. Think of the hundreds of tons of bombs destroying entire cities and wiping out families. But the suffering of civilians was for many years masked by the over-riding image, that of the French welcoming the liberators with open arms."

== See also ==
- Battle for Caen
- Bombing of France during World War II
- Operation Charnwood
