= Target of opportunity =

Military term for an unplanned attack target

A target of opportunity is a target "visible to a surface or air sensor or observer, which is within range of available weapons and against which fire has not been scheduled or requested." A target of opportunity comes in two forms; "unplanned" and "unanticipated". Unplanned targets of opportunity are those that fall within mission parameters as appropriate targets but were not included within a mission brief. Unanticipated targets are those that fall outside of mission parameters because their availability was not expected, such as an otherwise high-value target being identified at a location where another unrelated mission is underway.

== Procedure ==
In preparation for most ordinary combat military operations, armed forces are given a series of objectives that may include one or more primary targets. During combat operations, additional targets may be present. Provided any action to deal with those targets would not compromise outlined operational objectives, the military personnel may elect to attack additional targets if the opportunity to do so arises. Operational objectives and primary target allocation will generally not be altered to account for a target of opportunity unless that target is reviewed by a commanding officer and receives a higher target value designation; e.g. if identifiers reveal the target to be a designated high-value target.

== Examples ==
=== World War II ===
During World War II, prior to October 1940, the Royal Air Force instructed bomber crews to bring unexpended bombs home. From 9 October 1940, they were instructed to attack any target of opportunity if they could not locate their assigned targets.

=== Iraq War ===
At the beginning of the Iraq War, the US Military destroyed a dwelling considered to be the temporary home of Iraqi President Saddam Hussein. It was described by military sources and in subsequent media reports as a situation where a target of opportunity had presented itself. The result was described as follows: "although the immediate target was destroyed, the opportunity was missed, since the major target escaped, to be captured only many months later".

=== Nuclear targets ===
The United States Department of Defense and NATO has defined a nuclear target of opportunity as "a nuclear target detected observed or detected after an operation begins that has previously not been considered, analyzed or planned for a nuclear strike. Generally fleeting in nature, it should be attacked as soon as possible within the time limitations imposed for coordination and warning of friendly troops and aircraft."
