= Tilly-la-Campagne =

- Part of Castine-en-Plaine
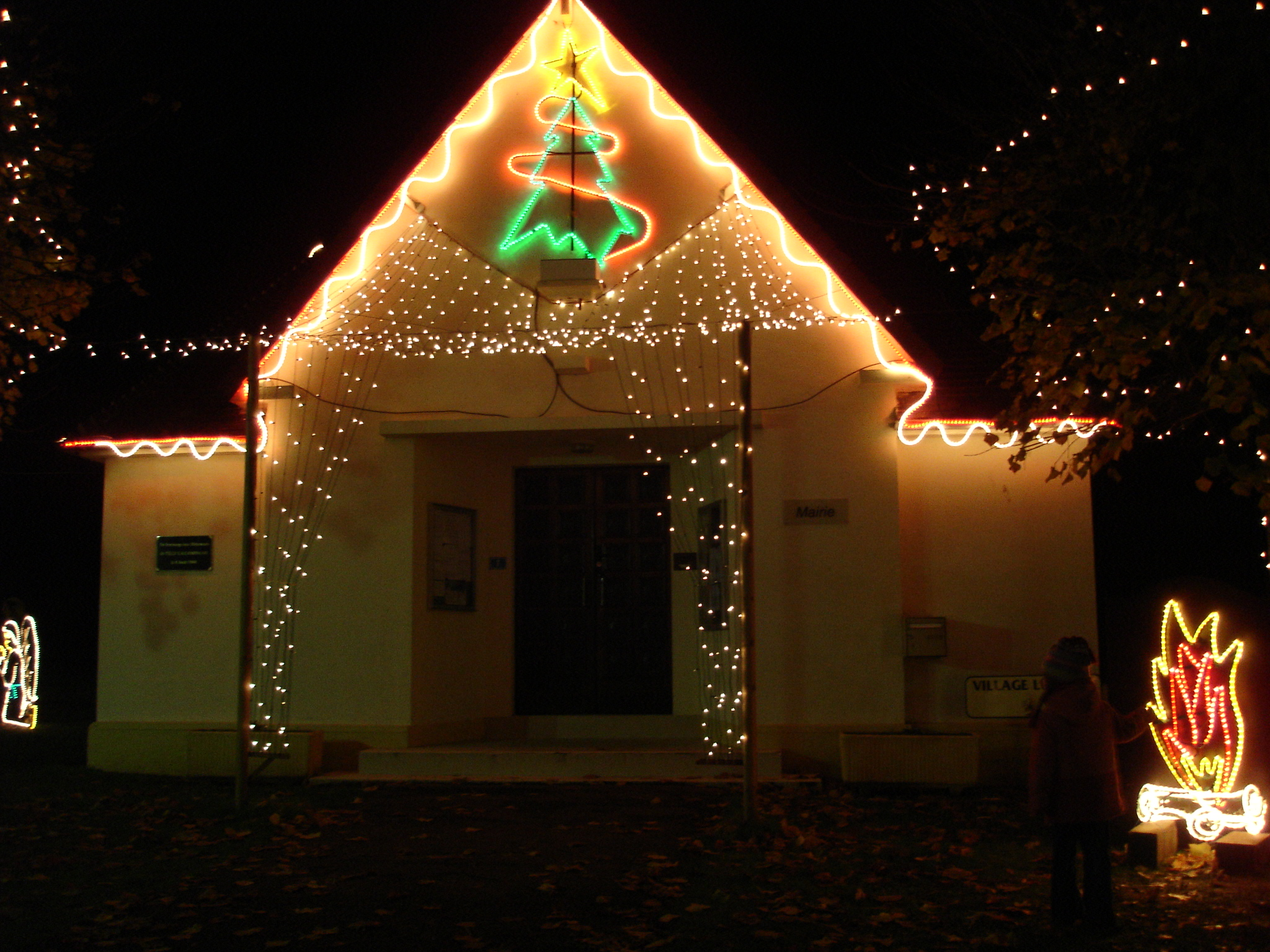
- Town hall at Christmas
- Location of Tilly-la-Campagne
- Location within France Location within Normandy
- Coordinates: 49°06′43″N 0°18′16″W
- Country: France
- Region: Normandy
- Department: Calvados
- Arrondissement: Caen
- Canton: Évrecy
- Commune: Castine-en-Plaine
- Area^{1}: 3.55 km^{2} (1.37 sq mi)
- Elevation: 90 m (300 ft)
- Highest elevation: 85 m (279 ft)
- Lowest elevation: 57 m (187 ft)
- Population (2023): 271
  - Density: 76.3/km^{2} (198/sq mi)
- Time zone: UTC+01:00 (CET)
  - Summer (DST): UTC+02:00 (CEST)
- Postal code: 14540
- ^{1} French Land Register data, which excludes lakes, ponds, glaciers > 1 km^{2} (0.386 sq mi or 247 acres) and river estuaries.

Tilly-la-Campagne (French pronunciation: [tiji la kɑ̃paɲ]) is a former commune in the Calvados department and Normandy region of north-western France. On 1 January 2019, it was merged into the new commune Castine-en-Plaine.

== See also ==
- Communes of the Calvados department
