= Hugh Dundas =

British Royal Air Force pilot (1920–1995)

Sir Hugh Dundas
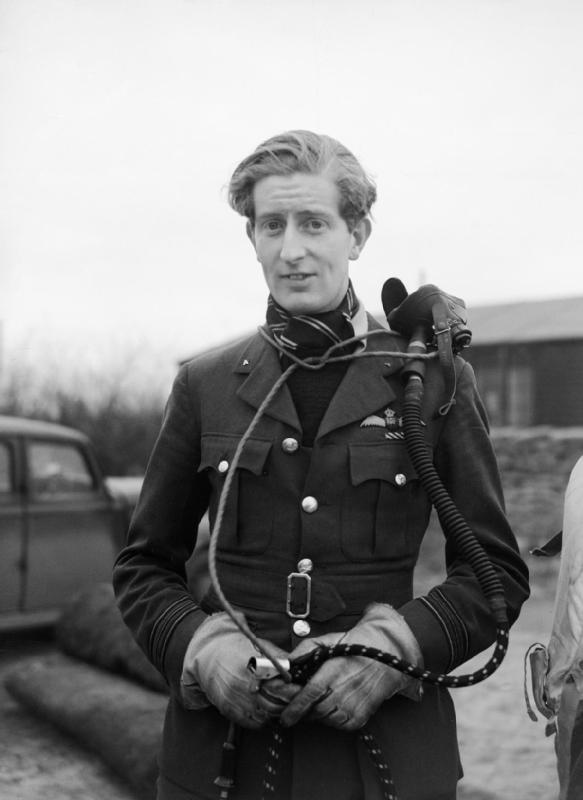
- Dundas at RAF Duxford, Cambridgeshire, 2 January 1942
- Born: 22 July 1920; Doncaster, England
- Died: 10 July 1995 (aged 74)
- Relatives: John Dundas (brother)
- Military career
- Allegiance: United Kingdom
- Branch: Royal Air Force
- Service years: 1938–1949
- Rank: Group Captain
- Nickname: Cocky
- Commands: No. 601 Squadron RAF (1948–49); No. 324 Wing RAF (1943–45); No. 56 Squadron RAF (1941–42)
- Conflicts: Second World War
- Awards: Knight Bachelor; Commander of the Order of the British Empire; Distinguished Service Order & Bar; Distinguished Flying Cross; Mentioned in Despatches
- Other work: Company director

Sir Hugh Spencer Lisle Dundas (22 July 1920 – 10 July 1995), nicknamed "Cocky", was a fighter pilot in the Royal Air Force (RAF) during the Second World War and later a senior broadcasting executive. He was promoted to squadron leader and awarded the Distinguished Flying Cross at the age of 21, advanced to wing commander at 22 and, at 23, was awarded the Distinguished Service Order and became one of the youngest group captains in the RAF. Dundas retired from the RAF in 1949, and was knighted in 1987 for his services to business and the media.

== Early life ==
Born in Doncaster, on 2 July 1920, Dundas was a scion of a noble family. He was the grandson of the Scottish Liberal politician John Dundas and a great-great-grandson of Lawrence Dundas, 1st Earl of Zetland. Dundas was also related to the Earl of Halifax. Like his elder brother John, he became fascinated by the idea of flying from childhood, and he joined the Auxiliary Air Force (AuxAF) straight after leaving Stowe School in 1938. On 23 July 1939, the day after his 19th birthday, he was commissioned an acting pilot officer in the AuxAF. He was confirmed in the rank of pilot officer on 2 October, with the service number 91001.

== Second World War ==
Dundas was called up early in the Second World War, serving with No. 616 Squadron flying Spitfires. He was shot down on 22 August 1940 and wounded during the Battle of Britain, but returned to his squadron in September. His brother John, a 12-kill ace with No. 609 Squadron, was killed in action in November 1940 after shooting down Helmut Wick, the top–scoring German ace at the time. Dundas was promoted to flying officer (war substantive) on 2 October.

In early 1941, No. 616 Squadron was a part of the RAF Tangmere Wing, under the command of Wing Commander Douglas Bader. Through the summer of 1941 Dundas frequently flew with Bader's section, gradually building his reputation as a competent fighter pilot and tactician. By now an acting flight lieutenant, he was awarded a Distinguished Flying Cross on 5 August 1941. The citation read:

Acting Flight Lieutenant Hugh Spencer Lisle Dundas (91001), Auxiliary Air Force, No. 616 Squadron. This officer has shown unflagging courage in the face of the enemy and the utmost tenacity in supporting his leader. He has destroyed at least three enemy aircraft and damaged others.

In September 1941, Dundas was posted as an instructor to No. 59 Operational Training Unit, but his scruffiness and unruly pet dog did not endear him to the commanding officer, Group Captain Stanley Vincent, and he was transferred promptly as a flight commander with No. 610 Squadron. Promoted to flight lieutenant (war substantive) on 2 October, he was subsequently promoted to acting squadron leader and posted as commanding officer of No. 56 Squadron RAF in December, the first to be equipped with the Hawker Typhoon. He was mentioned in despatches on 1 January 1943, and was promoted to squadron leader (war substantive) on 11 February.

Posted to the Mediterranean in 1943, he led No. 324 (Spitfire) Wing from Malta and through Italy. He was awarded his first Distinguished Service Order (DSO) on 3 March 1944. In June, Dundas was promoted to the acting rank of group captain at the age of only 23. He led No. 244 Wing from June 1944, and was promoted to wing commander (war substantive) on 11 May 1945. His war time score was 4 enemy aircraft destroyed, 6 shared destroyed, 2 shared probables, and 2 and 1 shared damaged.

== Post-war career and later life ==
On 1 September 1945, Dundas was granted a permanent commission in the RAF, in the rank of flight lieutenant. He was promoted to the temporary rank of squadron leader on 3 December 1946 (seniority from 1 July 1945). On 25 January 1947, however, he retired from the RAF, retaining the rank of group captain.

Dundas continued to serve in the reconstituted AuxAF following his retirement from active service. He was commissioned as a flying officer in the AuxAF on 8 August 1947 (seniority from 23 April). On the following 1 June, he received a double promotion to squadron leader in the AuxAF, and was given command of No. 601 (County of London) Squadron, but resigned his commission on 6 October 1949. He was also the air correspondent for the Daily Express newspaper.

Dundas joined Rediffusion Limited in 1961, becoming a director in 1966, and served as Chairman of Thames Television until 1987. He was appointed a Deputy Lieutenant on 7 October 1968. As managing director of British Electric Traction, he was appointed a Commander of the Order of the British Empire in the 1977 New Year Honours. As the firm's subsequent chairman, Dundas was knighted in the 1987 Birthday Honours. He served as High Sheriff of Surrey for 1989.
