= Eric Marrs =

British flying ace of WWII

- Born: 9 July 1921; Dover, United Kingdom
- Died: 24 July 1941 (aged 20); Brest, France
- Burial place: Kerfautras Cemetery, Brest
- Military career
- Allegiance: United Kingdom
- Branch: Royal Air Force
- Rank: Flight Lieutenant
- Nickname: 'Boy'
- Unit: No. 152 Squadron
- Conflicts: Second World War: Battle of Britain
- Awards: Distinguished Flying Cross

Eric Marrs DFC (9 July 1921 – 24 July 1941) was a British flying ace who served with the Royal Air Force (RAF) during the Second World War. He was credited with having shot down at least eleven aircraft.

From Dover, Marrs was a flight cadet at the RAF's College at Cranwell at the start of the Second World War. His training course was accelerated and in March 1940 he was posted to No. 152 Squadron as a pilot officer. Equipped with Supermarine Spitfire fighters, the squadron was heavily engaged in the Battle of Britain and Marrs destroyed several German aircraft during the campaign over the southwest of England. Awarded the Distinguished Flying Cross in early January 1941, he held the rank of flight lieutenant six months later. He was killed on 24 July on a sortie escorting RAF bombers attacking the German battleships Scharnhorst and Gneisenau.

== Early life ==
Eric Simcox Marrs was born in Dover, the United Kingdom, on 9 July 1921. He was educated at Dauntsey's School in West Lavington, Wiltshire, and then in April 1939 entered the RAF College at Cranwell as a flight cadet.

== Second World War ==
The outbreak of the Second World War shortened Marrs's course at Cranwell, and he graduated with a commission as a pilot officer on 7 March 1940. He was then posted to No. 152 Squadron. This was equipped with the Supermarine Spitfire fighter and based at Acklington, from where it was carrying out patrols along the coast and flew protective cover over shipping convoys.

=== Battle of Britain ===
In July No. 152 Squadron moved to Warmwell, part of No. 10 Group's sector, from where it was tasked with covering the south coast and the English Channel. Marrs, who was nicknamed 'Boy' on account of his relative youth having only just turned 19 when the Battle of Britain commenced, destroyed a Messerschmitt Bf 110 heavy fighter on 13 August. Three days later he probably destroyed a Heinkel He 111 medium bomber to the south of Southampton.

In the afternoon of 18 August, now known as The Hardest Day, the squadron was scrambled to the southeast of the Isle of Wight to intercept Junkers Ju 87 dive bombers that had just attacked the airfield at Gosport and were flying back to France; Marrs engaged and shot down a Ju 87, seeing it crash into the sea. Having expended all his ammunition, he returned to Warmwell although he had to evade pursuing a Messerschmitt Bf 109 fighter to do so. He shared in the destruction of a Dornier Do 17 medium bomber to the northwest of Portland on 22 August. Marrs destroyed a Bf 110 on 25 August, also near Portland.

Marrs's successes continued into September; he shared in the destruction of a Junkers Ju 88 medium bomber over Shepton Mallet on 17 September, and damaged two He 111s and a Bf 110 to the south of Bristol on 25 September. Two days later, also near Bristol, he destroyed a Ju 88. Marrs destroyed one Bf 110 and damaged a second about 5 miles (8.0 km) to the east of the squadron's airfield at Warmwell on 7 October. By this time the Luftwaffe's offensive campaign against England had slowed, although the squadron continued in a defensive role, intercepting the occasional Luftwaffe aircraft. Marrs shared in the shooting down of a Ju 88 near Shaftesbury on 14 November. Two weeks later, No. 152 Squdron carried out an interception involving several Luftwaffe fighters; Marrs destroyed a Bf 109 to the south of The Needles. It is possible that this was piloted by the German flying ace Helmut Wick although Flight Lieutenant John Dundas of No. 609 Squadron was also involved in the engagement and may have been responsible for Wick's death.

=== Later war service ===
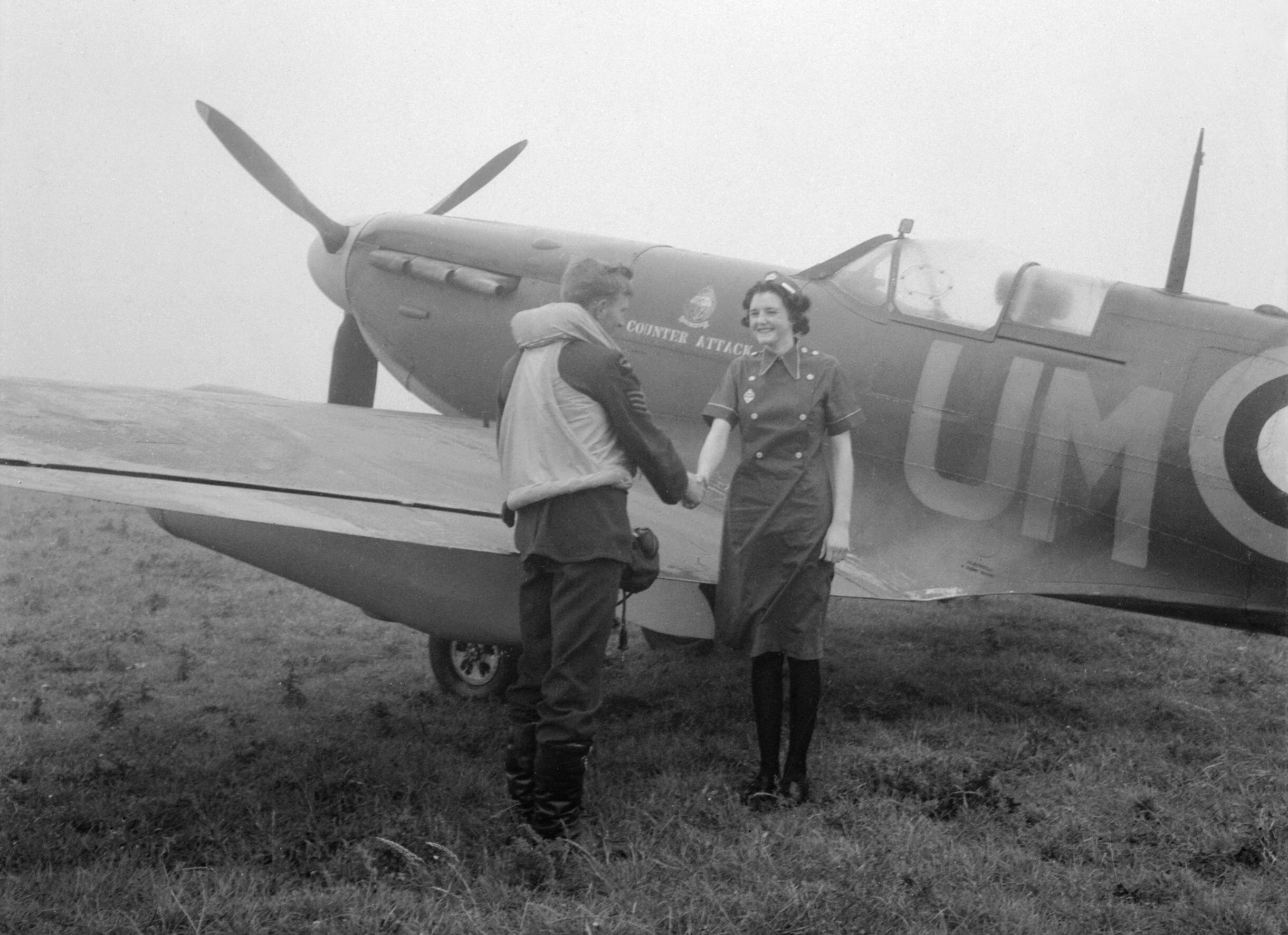
A Supermarine Spitfire fighter of No. 152 Squadron at Portreath, where it was stationed at the time of Marrs's death

On 4 January 1941, Marrs and another pilot combined to shoot down a Do 17 to the north of Warmwell. Three days later, the award of a Distinguished Flying Cross (DFC) to Marrs was announced. The citation for Marr's DFC, published in The London Gazette, read:

Pilot Officer Marrs has participated in numerous patrols against the enemy and, on occasions, he has led his flight, with great skill and coolness. He has destroyed at least six hostile aircraft.

— London Gazette, No. 35037, 7 January 1941

Marrs was promoted to flying officer in March, and the following month No. 152 Squadron shifted to Portreath. From here it was engaged in flying protective patrols over shipping convoys and within weeks began escort duties to bombers to German-occupied France and Coastal Command aircraft patrolling the Western Approaches. By this time Marrs was an acting flight lieutenant, commanding one of the squadron's flights, and on 18 July, he shared in the shooting down of a He 111 to the west of the Scilly Isles. On 24 July, the squadron was tasked with providing a fighter escort for Handley Page Hampden bombers targeting the German battleships Scharnhorst and Gneisenau at Brest in France. During this sortie, Marrs was killed when his Spitfire was hit by anti-aircraft fire over Brest and crashed.

The body of Marrs was recovered and he is buried at Kerfautras Cemetery in Brest. He is credited with the destruction of eleven German aircraft, five of these being shared with other pilots, and the damaging of four others. He is also credited with the probable destruction of one aircraft.
