= John Dundas (RAF officer) =

British aviator (1915–1940)

John Charles Dundas
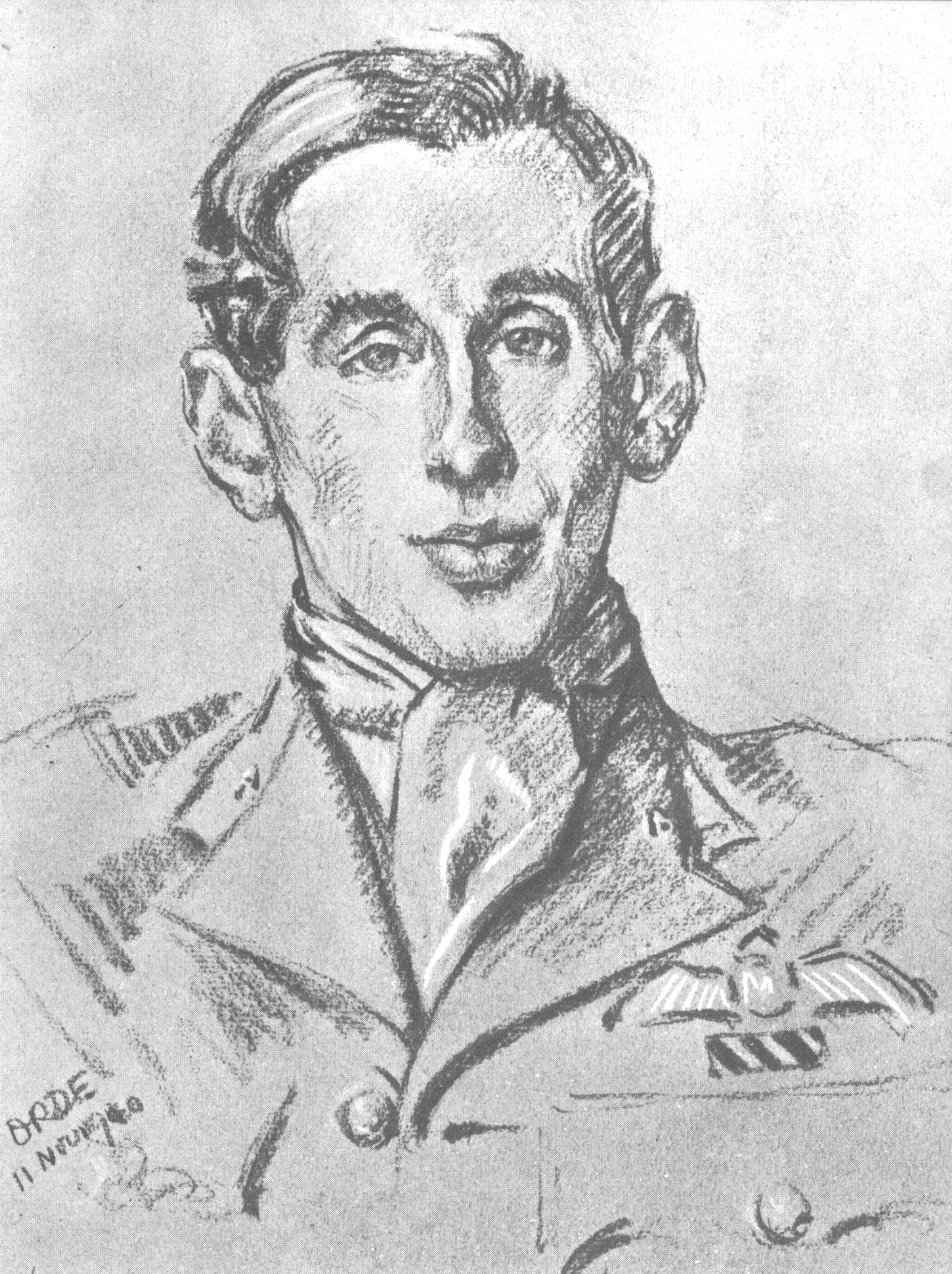
- Portrait of John Dundas, by Cuthbert Orde
- Born: 19 August 1915; West Yorkshire, England
- Died: 28 November 1940 (aged 25); English Channel, off the Isle of Wight, England
- Relatives: Sir Hugh Dundas (brother)
- Military career
- Allegiance: United Kingdom
- Branch: Royal Air Force
- Service years: 1938–1940
- Rank: Flight lieutenant
- Nickname: Dogs
- Unit: No. 609 Squadron RAF
- Conflicts: Second World War: Battle of France; Battle of Britain; Kanalkampf; Adlertag; Battle of Britain Day; Channel Front †
- Awards: Distinguished Flying Cross & Bar

John Charles Dundas (19 August 1915 – 28 November 1940) was a Royal Air Force fighter pilot and flying ace of the Second World War credited with 12 victories.

Born in West Yorkshire as the son of an aristocrat, Dundas was an able student and academic. After graduating from Christ Church, Oxford, he became a journalist and joined a newspaper in his home county. After two years, Dundas tired of life as a reporter and joined the Royal Auxiliary Air Force (RAuxAF) in July 1938, being commissioned as pilot officer in No. 609 (West Riding) Squadron and trained as a pilot at his own expense.

In May 1940 his squadron took part in the Battle of France, during which Dundas claimed his first two victories. Dundas remained with his squadron throughout the Battle of Britain, claiming nine German aircraft shot down. On 9 October he was awarded the Distinguished Flying Cross (DFC) for 10 victories. At the time of his last battle Dundas had been credited with 12 aircraft destroyed, two shared destroyed, four probably destroyed and five damaged. During a battle over the English Channel on 28 November 1940, Dundas is believed to have engaged and shot down Helmut Wick, the highest-scoring ace of the Luftwaffe at that time. Moments later Dundas was also shot down into the sea. Both pilots vanished and remain missing in action.

== Early life ==
John Charles Dundas was born in West Yorkshire in 1915. He was related to two aristocratic families in the region; he was the grandson of the Scottish Liberal politician John Dundas and the great-grandson of Lawrence Dundas, 1st Earl of Zetland. Dundas was also related to the House of Halifax.

Dundas won a scholarship to Stowe School at the age of 12. At the age of 17 he won a second scholarship to Christ Church, Oxford. Dundas graduated with a first class degree in Modern History before winning a further award that allowed him to study at both Sorbonne and the University of Heidelberg.

Dundas subsequently became a journalist for the Yorkshire Post and its editorial staff. Another who worked on the paper at the time, Richard Pape, (Note: Pape later served in RAF Bomber Command. He was taken prisoner by the Germans, but escaped by feigning illness and being repatriated during a prisoner exchange. His post-war account of his wartime career, Boldness Be My Friend (1953), was very successful.) recalled him as a man indifferent to his personal appearance, who wore frayed trousers, frequently had ink-stained hands and would spill beer over himself when drinking, yet who was also popular with the newspaper's younger, female staff members.

The newspaper sent him to Czechoslovakia during the Munich Crisis as a part of Prime Minister Neville Chamberlain's entourage in 1938 before travelling to Rome to report on a meeting between Benito Mussolini, Chamberlain and Lord Halifax, the Foreign Secretary, to whom Dundas was related.

In July 1938, at the age of 23, Dundas was commissioned as a pilot officer in No. 609 Squadron RAF, an Auxiliary Air Force squadron. Hugh and John's godfather had set up the unit. At that time, the squadron was manned by part-time civilians and was equipped with Hawker Hind bombers.

John Dundas was well respected by his peers and he frequently flew his commanding officer's Hind. However, on 18 June 1939, Dundas was flying this aircraft when it suffered an engine failure on take-off. Without the power to get airborne, it crashed through the airfield fence and finished up in the garden of a neighbouring house. It was subsequently written off.

The squadron was converted from a bomber to a fighter aircraft squadron and later, in August 1939, re-equipped with the Supermarine Spitfire. Dundas' younger brother Hugh was also a fighter pilot. Hugh was wounded in August 1940 but recovered and eventually rose to the rank of group captain. He survived the war and died in 1995.

== Second World War ==
=== Battle of France ===
Dundas was promoted to the rank of flying officer in January 1940. 609 Squadron was positioned on the south coast of England in May 1940, and was part of RAF Fighter Command operations to provide air cover for the Royal Navy and civilian vessels that were taking part in the Dunkirk evacuation.

On 30 May, he flew his first patrol. The following day his squadron was put on 30 minutes readiness at RAF North Weald from 12:30 pm. At 14:00 His squadron took off, headed for Dunkirk at 20,000 feet (6,100 m) and engaged the enemy for the first time. In the next patrol, flying L1096, Dundas engaged a German bomber formation and destroyed a Heinkel He 111 and a Dornier Do 17. Dundas did not score again during the Battle of France.

On 11 June, Dundas flew one of nine Spitfires that escorted a plane flying Winston Churchill to France, on a mission to try and convince the French to keep fighting.

=== Battle of Britain ===
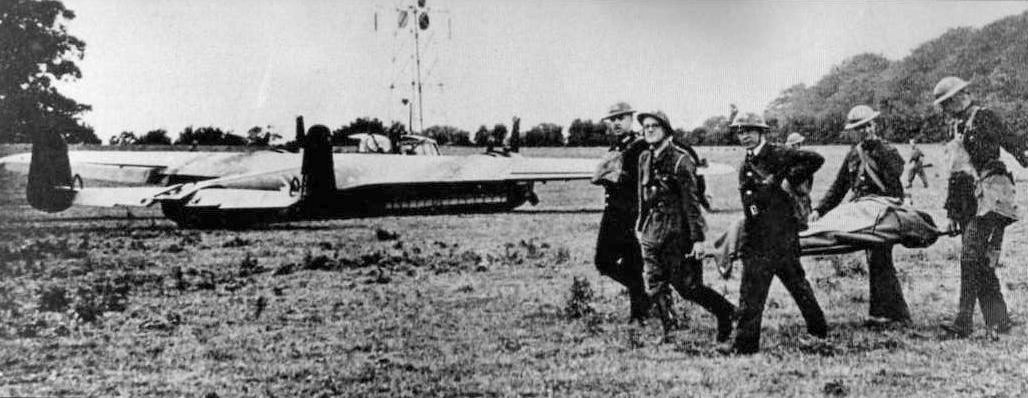
Rudolf Heitsch's Dornier, shot down by Dundas and his wingman on 15 September 1940. The machine carried a flame throwing device which is just visible on the aft fuselage (see victory list for details). Feldwebel Pfeiffer is being carried on a stretcher.

Over the next few weeks 609 Squadron had moved from RAF Northolt to RAF Middle Wallop. It was from here Dundas gained his first victory of the Battle of Britain, in a phase known as the Kanalkampf. On 13 July, as section leader, Dundas led a patrol over a convoy. Failing to find the convoy the Spitfires engaged German aircraft at 15,000 feet (4,600 m) near Portland, England. Flying in R6634 Dundas led a diving attack out of the sun against Messerschmitt Bf 110s. Dundas claimed a Bf 110 destroyed though the damaged aircraft and its wounded pilot, Leutnant Krebitz, made it back to France, where the Bf 110 was severely damaged in a crash-landing. In late July while night-flying Dundas narrowly escaped with his life; coming into land, his wing struck an artillery emplacement. He landed without injury.

Over the next few days, Dundas fought continuous battles with German formations. He noted the growing intensity of the air battles and assumed responsibility for the unit's war diary in August. In this diary he remarked;

So far as 609 was concerned, the Nazi blitz began on the 8th August...Four pilots engaged and accounted for five huns.

On 11 August 1940 Dundas flew R6769. Taking off at 09:45 am he led yellow section out to sea near the Isle of Wight at 24,000 feet (7,300 m). Dundas and two other Spitfires (including his wingman) lost contact with his squadron. He saw nine Hawker Hurricanes below and in mid-Channel but also noticed contrails above and climbed up to investigate. The aircraft were Bf 110s, with Messerschmitt Bf 109s providing top cover. Dundas led an attack, but lost the other Spitfires and attacked alone. He shot down a Bf 110 but received hits from German rear gunners. It is likely that the Bf 110 was from I./Zerstörergeschwader 2 ("destroyer wing 2").

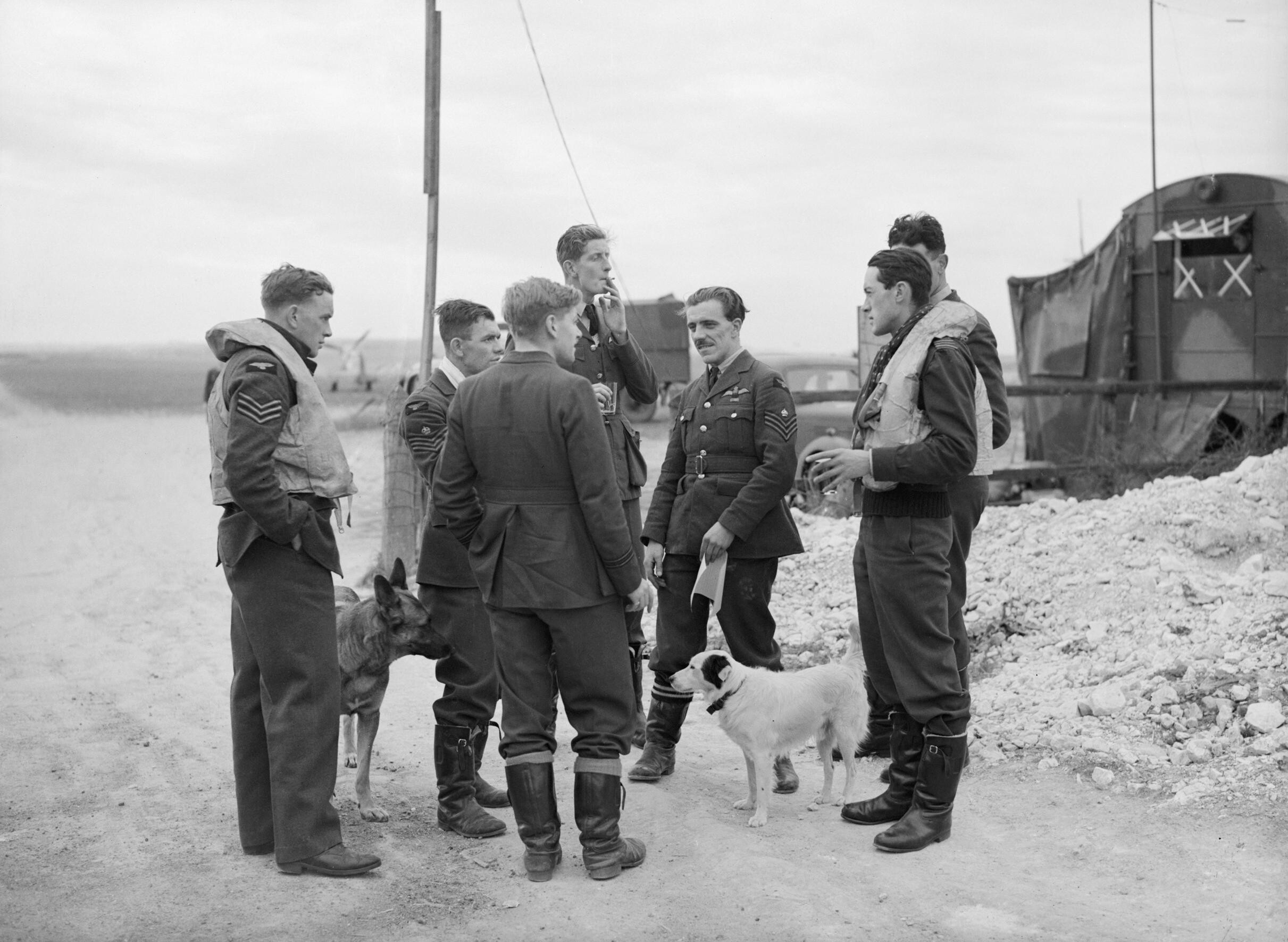
John Dundas (smoking) with No. 19 Squadron aircrew at Manor Farm near RAF Duxford, September 1940.

On 12 August the battle was repeated against Bf 109s and Bf 110s over the same area. Dundas shot down another Bf 110. Shaking off a Bf 109, he damaged another but was forced to disengage as more German fighters closed in and fuel and ammunition had run low. His fifth victory now made him a flying ace.

A major effort was made by the Luftwaffe on 13 August 1940. Christened Adlertag ("eagle day"), the Germans began a series of heavy air attacks. At 15:30 No. 609 Squadron was scrambled, with Dundas flying in R6690 as number four in red section. At 10,000 feet (3,000 m) he spotted German fighters. Red leader could not see the enemy and instructed Dundas to take the lead. Climbing into the sun at 18,000 feet (5,500 m), Dundas saw Junkers Ju 87 Stuka dive-bombers below him. Attacking he shot down one of the Ju 87s from Sturzkampfgeschwader 2 ("dive bombing wing 2"). Dundas damaged another before being hit. He made a "dead-stick" landing at RAF Warmwell. The German unit that 609 attacked was badly hit. One Staffel ("squadron") of II./StG 2 lost six out of nine Ju 87s.

The following day, 14 August 609 was patrolling Boscombe Down at 15,000 feet (4,600 m). Flying Spitfire R6961, Dundas damaged a Bf 110 before it escaped into cloud. Directed onto a formation of Do 17s soon after he damaged one bomber before taking hits from defensive fire. Returning to base, Dundas spotted a He 111 with its wheels down and made a brief attack that caused it to crash 5 miles (8 km) south-west of his airfield. (Note: Flight Lieutenant J.H.G McArthur witnessed the crash.) The machine belonged to the Stabsstaffel from Kampfgeschwader 55 ("bomber wing 55").

Dundas did not make another claim until 15 September, a date known as Battle of Britain Day. In the morning, piloting R6922, he damaged a Do 17, knocking out one of its engines. Flying another Spitfire, X4107, he shared a Do 17 with his wingmen, Pilot Officer Mike Appleby, and the American pilot Vernon Keough. On 24 September, he damaged a Do 17 while destroying a Bf 110 in X4472. In the same Spitfire Dundas claimed a Bf 109 shot down on 26 September and damaged another Do 17. The following day he claimed a Bf 110 destroyed near Bristol.

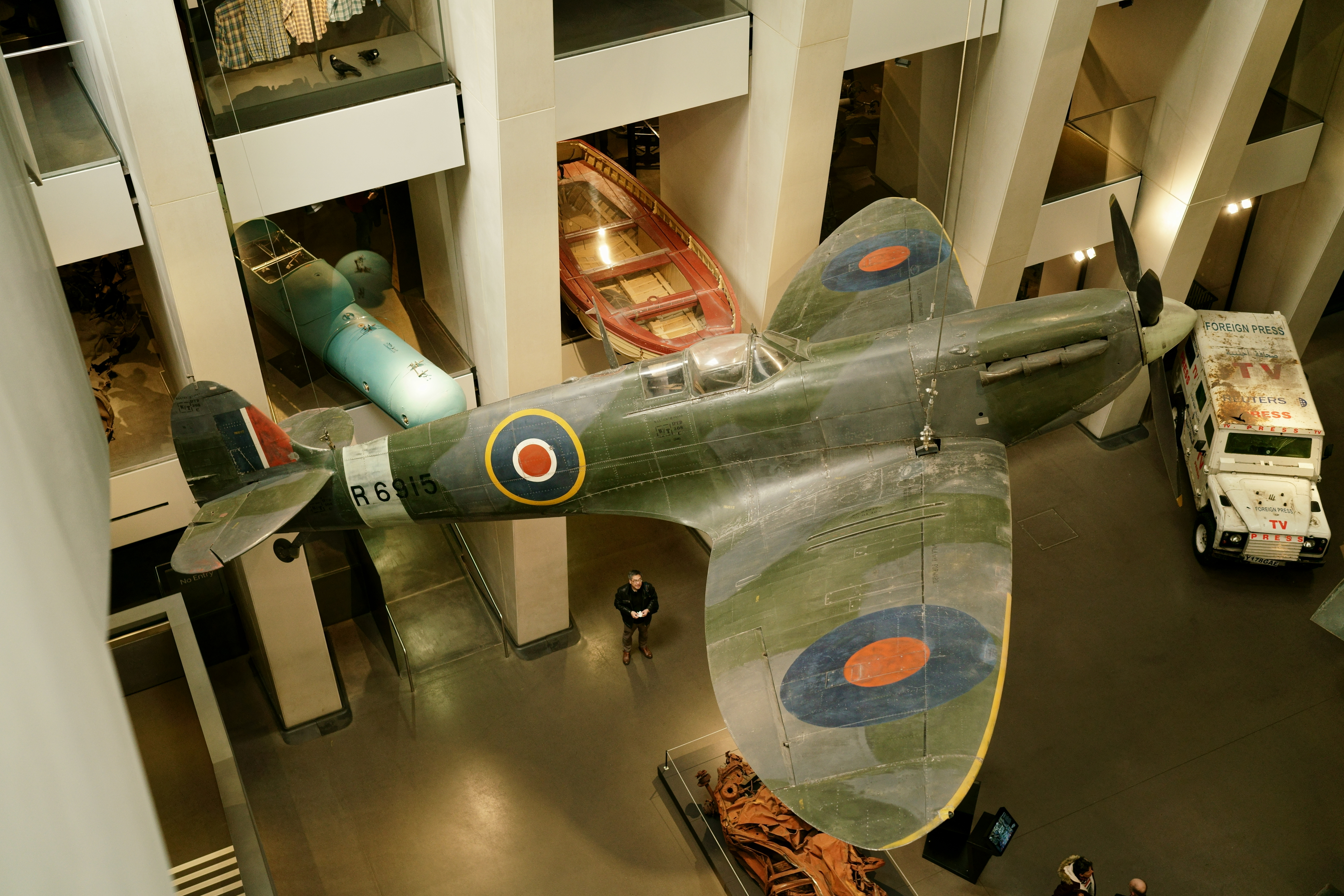
Spitfire R6915, Imperial War Museum (2019). Dundas made a probable claim against a Bf 110 on 9 October 1940 in this machine.

Eleven days later Dundas claimed a probable victory against a Bf 110, after a battle with German aircraft six miles north of RAF Warmwell at 16:30. Despite firing a 12–14 second burst at the enemy fighter, he did not see it crash. During the battle Dundas was hit in the leg when a cannon round exploded in his cockpit, but flew again the next day. The Spitfire Dundas flew that day, R6915, still exists, having been preserved by the Imperial War Museum. By 9 October 1940, his score stood at 10 and he was awarded the Distinguished Flying Cross.

A week later, on 15 October 1940, Dundas destroyed another Bf 110 in P9503 at 14,000 feet (4,300 m) over Christchurch, Dorset. Evading a Bf 109 attack, Dundas' radio failed and he was unable to re-group his section. Noticing Bf 110s above at 18,000–20,000 feet (5,500–6,100 m) he climbed to attack; his victim crashed at Bournemouth. He was then chased by a pair of Bf 109s but evaded them. His victory was 609's 99th aerial victory. (Note: Lieutenant Frankie Howell DFC, claimed a Junkers Ju 88 as the unit's 100th victory on 21 October. Howell's Spitfire, X4590, can be seen at the Royal Air Force Museum London. See: Franks 1980, p. 188.)

=== Channel Front and last battle ===
By now Dundas was recognised as the highest scoring pilot of the unit, he was highly regarded by his comrades and was well-liked. He passed on experience to younger pilots and was always willing to discuss tactics, particularly with Squadron Leader Michael Robinson. Dundas, even by this early stage in the war, was the only member of the original 'A' (Auxiliary) pilots still with 609. Dundas lamented the few who remained were the "sole champions of the Auxiliary attitude".

On 27 November, a Ju 88 was reported near Southampton. Dundas asked permission to intercept but was refused. Approaching his squadron leader, Dundas asked to take his section up for a practice flight; Robinson did not expect anything untoward and gave permission. At 22,000 feet (6,700 m) Dundas' section made contact, chasing the German over the Isle of Wight at full throttle – reaching 2,600 revs. The Ju 88 had a healthy head start but Dundas closed with it and got to within 400 yards (370 m), 15 miles (24 km) off Cherbourg, France. Dundas fired X4586's guns for five seconds while the German gunners put up a determined defence. The Ju 88's port engine caught fire and it dived down steeply, out of control. Now in sight of an airfield filled with Bf 109s, Dundas decided to retreat. He was credited with a probable victory upon his return.

The next day, 28 November, was busy for 609 Squadron. Several scrambles and alerts came through against Bf 109s. The last came at approximately 15:30 Greenwich Mean Time. Dundas was once again piloting X4586. Two squadrons, 152 Squadron and 609 made contact with Bf 109s from Jagdgeschwader 2 ("fighter wing 2"), led by the most successful German ace of the war thus far — Helmut Wick. Minutes after contact had been made and the battle joined, Flight Lieutenant Fieldsend heard the familiar voice of Dundas shout "I've finished a 109—Whoopee!". Squadron Leader Robinson congratulated Dundas but nothing was heard from Dundas, or his wingman Pilot Officer Paul A. Baillon, flying R6631.

It is believed Wick had shot down Baillon in a diving attack for his 56th aerial victory. Baillon managed to bail out, but was never recovered. Momentarily distracted, Wick flew across Dundas' path. Dundas fired a short burst, hitting Wick's Bf 109 at around 17:00 German time, over the sea near the Isle of Wight. It has also been suggested that Wick fell victim to Pilot Officer Eric Marrs, who also made a claim in the battle. Wick was seen to bail out of his aircraft, but he was not rescued and his body was never found. Moments later Dundas was probably shot down by Wick's wingman, Rudolf Pflanz who claimed a victory and saw the Spitfire crash into the sea with the pilot still inside. Like Wick, Dundas' body was never found. On 24 December 1940, Dundas was posthumously awarded a second DFC. It was announced on 7 January 1941 in the London Gazette with the citation:

Flight Lieutenant Dundas has continued to engage the enemy with outstanding success and has now destroyed at least twelve of their aircraft and damaged many more. On one occasion he pursued an enemy aircraft from Winchester to Cherbourg, finally destroying it. He has shown a magnificent fighting spirit which has inspired the other members of his flight.

=== Memorial and R6915 ===
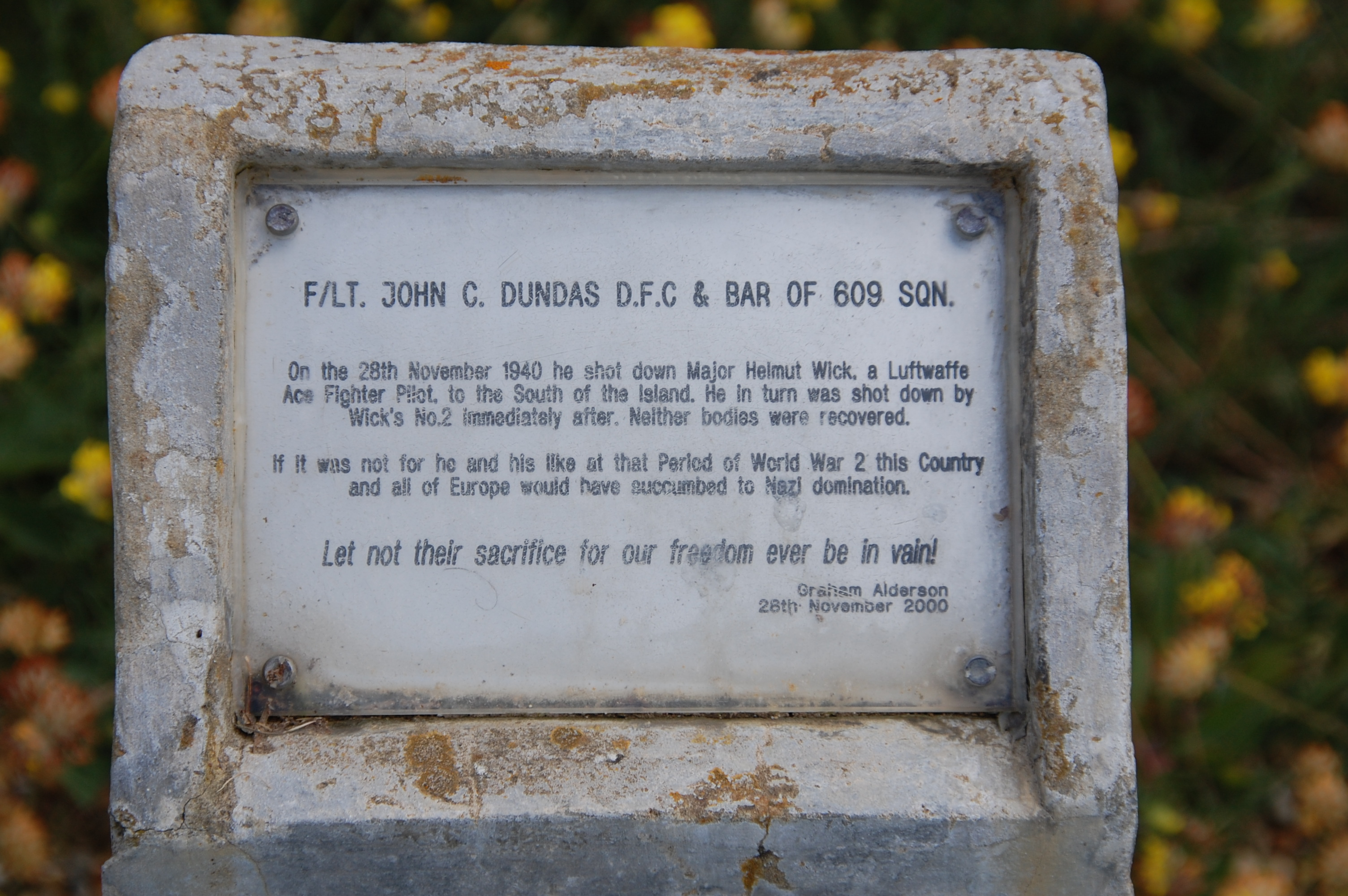
The monument to Dundas on the Isle of Wight (2010)

As an airman who has no known grave, he is commemorated on the Air Forces Memorial at Runnymede (Panel 4).

A small memorial to Dundas is on a cliff-top path east of Freshwater Bay on the Isle of Wight, close to the point where his final battle took place. It was installed in November 2000, on the 60th anniversary of his death.

One of the aircraft Dundas flew in combat, Supermarine Spitfire number R6915, still exists and is preserved in the Imperial War Museum in London. In this aircraft, he claimed a probable kill over a Bf 110 on 7 October 1940.

== List of victories ==
A list of Dundas' claims from 31 May – 28 November 1940.

Chronicle of aerial victories
Claim No.	Date	Kills	Notes
1–2.	31 May 1940	Heinkel He 111 destroyed Dornier Do 17 destroyed	
3.	13 July 1940	Messerschmitt Bf 110 destroyed	Claimed south of Portland at 15:20. Victim identified as Leutnant Krebitz from V./Lehrgeschwader 1 and unknown gunner. Krebitz was wounded and crash-landed in France. The Bf 110 was 60% destroyed.
4.	11 August 1940	Messerschmitt Bf 110 destroyed	Claimed at 10:15 15 miles south west of Swanage. Victim identified as pilot Oberleutnant Henschel, killed, and gunner Oblt Schafer wounded. Both were from Stab./ZG 2.
5.	12 August 1940	Messerschmitt Bf 110 destroyed Messerschmitt Bf 110 damaged	Claimed at 12:30 over Isle of Wight. Victim most likely from I./ZG 2 or III./ZG 76. ZG 2 lost five Bf 110s, ZG 76 lost four. Hauptmann Graf Hoyen was killed and his gunner posted missing after being shot down by one 609 Squadron Spitfire at 12:26 over the Isle of Wight. I./ZG 2 lost its Gruppenkommandeur Hans-Peter Kulbel and his gunner Unteroffizier Fritz Budig near Portsmouth. Kulbel washed upon shore near Boulogne, France, and Budig was buried at sea but washed ashore and was buried in Hampshire.
6.	13 August 1940	Junkers Ju 87 destroyed Junkers Ju 87 damaged	Claimed over Lyme Bay at 16:00. Ju 87 likely belonged to II./StG 2. One killed, one missing.
	14 August 1940	Dornier Do 17 probable shared Heinkel He 111.	The shared victory was achieved with Pilot Officer D.M. Cook over Heinkel He 111P-4, Werknummer (factory number) 2898, Code G1+AA Geschwaderkommodore (Wing Commander) Oberst (Colonel) Alois Stoeckl of Kampfgeschwader 55 (KG 55—Bomber Wing 55), Oberst Walter Frank, Feldwebel Heinz Grimmstein, Feldwebel Jonny Theil, Oberleutnant Bruno Broßle killed, two others wounded.
.	25 August 1940	Messerschmitt Bf 110 probable	
.	15 September 1940	Third share Dornier Do 17; Dornier Do 17 damaged	The Do 17 belonged to 8 Staffel (Squadron), Kampfgeschwader 76 (KG 76—Bomber Wing 76). The Do 17, Code F1+FS, flown by Hauptmann (Captain) Rudolf Heitsch, was found in a field near Shoreham, Kent. The Dornier was found to be fitted with a flamethrower, installed in the tail. Oil, nitrogen, and hydrogen cylinders were found in the fuselage, while the external pipe was fitted with a jet. Initially, it was concluded that it was a smoke producing device to feign damage. But it was discovered that it was a device that was triggered by one of the rear gunners to destroy a fighter pursuing the bomber from line astern. However, the lack of oxygen meant that the device failed to function, and only a continual spray of oil was emitted. Heitsch survived, along with a Feldwebel Pfeiffer and Sauter. Feldwebel Stephan Schmidt was killed.
7.	24 September 1940	Messerschmitt Bf 110 destroyed Dornier Do 17 damaged	Claimed at 16:30.
8.	25 September 1940	Dornier Do 17 destroyed	Claimed destroyed at 12:00 south of Bristol.
9.	26 September 1940	Messerschmitt Bf 109 destroyed Dornier Do 17 damaged	Claimed over Southampton, 16:30.
10.	27 September 1940	Messerschmitt Bf 110 destroyed	Claimed at 11:45 in the Weymouth–Swanage area in the county of Dorset. Bf 110s from I., II. and III./Zerstörergeschwader 26 (ZG 26—Destroyer Wing 26) involved in this combat. 11 Bf 110s were shot down, two damaged and one crash-landed at Dieppe, France, 70% damaged. Six were shot down by unidentified Squadrons—four belonging to Erprobungsgruppe 210 were downed over Yeovil. In the vicinity of Dundas' claim, Bf 110 C-4, Werknummer (factory number) 2168, 3U+BD, was destroyed and its pilot Oblt Hans Barschel was killed. Gunner Unteroffizier (Corporal) Klose posted missing. Bf 110 C-4 Werknummer (factory number) 3290, code 3U+DS was also shot down. Unteroffizier Schupp and Gefreiter Nechwatal, missing. Both machines were shot down over Dorset.
.	7 October 1940	Messerschmitt Bf 110 probable	
11.	15 October 1940	Messerschmitt Bf 110 destroyed	Claimed over Christchurch at 12:40.
.	27 November 1940	Junkers Ju 88 probable	
12.	28 November 1940	Messerschmitt Bf 109 destroyed	Geschwaderkommodore, JG 2 Helmut Wick (56 air victories) killed in action.

== See also ==
- List of people who disappeared mysteriously at sea
