= Helmut Wick =

German officer and fighter pilot in World War II

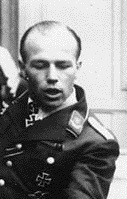
- Wick in October 1940
- Born: 5 August 1915; Mannheim, Duchy of Baden, German Empire
- Died: 28 November 1940 (aged 25); English Channel, off the Isle of Wight, England
- Military career
- Allegiance: Nazi Germany
- Branch: Luftwaffe
- Service years: 1936–1940
- Rank: Major
- Units: JG 133, JG 53
- Commands: JG 2
- Conflicts: See battles World War II: Phoney War; Battle of France; Battle of Britain †
- Awards: Knight's Cross of the Iron Cross with Oak Leaves

Helmut Paul Emil Wick (5 August 1915 – 28 November 1940) was a German flying ace of World War II. He was a wing commander in the Luftwaffe (air force) of Nazi Germany, and the fourth recipient of the Knight's Cross of the Iron Cross with Oak Leaves, the nation's highest military decoration at the time. (Note: In 1940, the Knight's Cross of the Iron Cross with Oak Leaves was second only to the Grand Cross of the Iron Cross (Großkreuz des Eisernen Kreuzes), which was awarded only to senior commanders for winning a major battle or campaign, in the military order of the Third Reich. The Knight's Cross of the Iron Cross with Oak Leaves as highest military order was surpassed on 28 September 1941 by the Knight's Cross of the Iron Cross with Oak Leaves and Swords (Ritterkreuz des Eisernen Kreuzes mit Eichenlaub und Schwertern).)

Born in Mannheim, Wick joined the Luftwaffe in 1936 and was trained as a fighter pilot. He was assigned to Jagdgeschwader 2 "Richthofen" (JG 2—2nd Fighter Wing), and saw combat in the Battles of France and Britain. In October 1940, he was given the position of wing commander of JG 2—the youngest in the Luftwaffe to hold this position. Wick was shot down in the vicinity of the Isle of Wight on 28 November 1940, most likely by the British ace John Dundas, who was himself shot down by Wick's wingman. Wick was posted as missing in action, presumed dead. By then he had been credited with the destruction of 56 enemy aircraft in aerial combat, making him the leading German ace at the time. Flying the Messerschmitt Bf 109, he claimed all of his victories against the Western Allies.

== Early life and pre-war service ==
Helmut Paul Emil Wick was born on 5 August 1915 in Mannheim, Germany, the youngest of three children of an agricultural engineer, Karl Wick and Berta Wick, née Schenck. Helmut's eldest brother Walter was born in Swakopmund, at the time in the German protectorate in South-West Africa. After the outbreak of World War I, the family returned to Germany. Owing to the demand for his father's skills and expertise building roads and bridges, Helmut spent most of his childhood traveling throughout the German Empire. The Wick family moved to Hanover in 1919; Helmut's mother died there in February 1922. His father then took the family to Oliva, near Danzig and Königsberg in East Prussia, finally settling in Berlin in 1935.

Upon graduating from Gymnasium (secondary school) in 1935, Wick applied to the officer candidate course of the new German Air Force. Scoring well on the suitability tests, he was accepted into the German military on 6 April 1936 at the Luftwaffe officer candidate school in Dresden, after completing compulsory Reich Labour Service. He swore the oath of allegiance to Adolf Hitler on 16 April. After passing officer training courses, Wick was assessed as "well suited to become an officer" on 13 July. He then started flight training and shortly later soloed in a Focke-Wulf Fw 44 "Stieglitz". Wick was considered an average pilot and had difficulties with his theoretical training, especially those topics that were of little or no interest to him. In early May 1937, he was briefly transferred to the 6. Staffel (6th squadron) of Kampfgeschwader 254 (254th Bomber Wing). A month later he returned to Dresden to complete his officer training.

Wick failed to pass the third course of his training but was given a second chance and on 1 April 1938 reported to the officer candidate school at the Luftkriegsschule 3 (LKS 3—3rd air war school), Wildpark-West near Werder. He successfully completed the course and in mid-1938 started special pilot training at the Fighter Training facility at Werneuchen. Upon graduation, he was assigned to II.Gruppe Jagdgeschwader 135 (135th Fighter Wing) which on 1 November 1938 became Jagdgeschwader 333 (333rd Fighter Wing) under Oberstleutnant (Lieutenant Colonel) Max Ibel at Herzogenaurach, flying obsolete Arado Ar 68 biplane fighters. On 8 November 1938, Oberfähnrich (senior ensign) Wick was promoted to Leutnant (second lieutenant) and on 1 January 1939 was transferred to 1. Staffel of Jagdgeschwader 133 (133rd Fighter Wing), which was later renamed Jagdgeschwader 53 (JG 53—53rd Fighter Wing). It was there that Wick began flying the Messerschmitt Bf 109 monoplane fighter under the tutelage of Werner Mölders, a Spanish Civil War flying ace credited with 14 aerial victories. Under Mölders' guidance, Wick became a Schwarmführer (flight leader).

== World War II ==
=== Phoney War and Battle of France ===
On 31 August 1939 Wick was given orders to transfer to "Jagdgeschwader Richthofen Nr. I". At the time there was no such unit; the intention was to send him to Jagdgeschwader 1 (JG 1−1st Fighter Wing), based in Döberitz, near Berlin. During World War I the "Richthofen Geschwader" name had been attached to the World War I era Jagdgeschwader 1. The "Richthofen" name had been incorrectly put on Wick's order. Wick noticed the mistake, realizing that he could now choose between JG 1 or the famous Jagdgeschwader 2 (JG 2—2nd Fighter Wing) which currently bore the "Richthofen" name. He chose the Richthofen Geschwader, commanded by Oberst (Colonel) Gerd von Massow, the unit was equipped with the Bf 109 E-3 and used the tactical code Yellow 3.

Wick joined its 3. Staffel, serving in the air defence of Berlin during the German invasion of Poland which began World War II. Following the German victory in Poland, JG 2 was transferred to Frankfurt-Rebstock and tasked with protection of Germany's Western border during the Phoney War—the phase between Britain and France's declaration of war on Germany in September 1939, and the Battle of France in May 1940. Flying his sixth combat mission, Leutnant Wick claimed his first, and the Geschwader's second victory on 22 November 1939. (Note: According to Ringlstetter the Geschwader's first victory was credited to Oberfeldwebel Erwin Kley, who received a gold watch and for this achievement. Weal states that the first victory went to Wick.) Wick was interviewed by German press for a newsreel on his own "factual" account of the 22 November action. Near Nancy, he shot down a French Curtiss Hawk 75 fighter piloted by either Sergent Saillard or Camille Plubeau of the Groupe de Chasse II/4 Armée de l’Air, who were killed. For this feat, Wick received the Iron Cross 2nd Class (Eisernes Kreuz 2. Klasse). Wick was allowed to take home leave from his Geschwader and spent Christmas with his wife Ursel, his baby son Walter, and his parents, before returning to his Gruppe at Frankfurt-Rebstock. From 10 to 17 February 1940, Wick and six other members from JG 2 spent a week in the Black Forest on the Feldberg, skiing and relaxing.

On 10 May 1940, German forces launched an offensive in Western Europe, but Wick remained on the ground while his aircraft, Bf 109 Yellow 2, underwent an engine change. Seven days later, he was back in the air, recording three victories over French LeO 45 bombers in one mission. By 6 June, Wick had 10 confirmed and two unconfirmed victories, including four French Bloch 151/152 fighters that he shot down on 5 June to record his fourth through seventh victories. The two unconfirmed victories were Royal Navy Fairey Swordfish biplane torpedo bombers claimed on 19 May and for which he had no witnesses. Wick claimed that he observed one of the enemy gunners in the Swordfish wave a cloth which he perceived as an act of surrender before following it down and watching the pilot land. As he did so, the gunner apparently believed Wick was preparing to attack and fired forcing the German pilot to shoot it down. Wick reported it hit the ground and turned over near Calais. The action of 5 June, according to Wick, occurred near Péronne from 17:17 to 17:30. The French Air Force made an effort to bomb the bridge heads on the Somme on the 5 June. 126 sorties were flown. The 18 and 19 GBA (Groupe de bombardement—Group of Bombardment) lost four Bréguet 693 near Péronne when they were attacked by German fighters while undertaking an attack on German tanks and lorries. A second operation was carried out without loss to French bomber forces, but the escorting French fighter group GC I/4 lost one Curtis Hawk fighter. The French fighter commands, ZOAN and ZOAE flew 438 combat missions submitting the loss of 15 fighters. At approximately 17:00, three Morane-Saulnier M.S.406s from GC I/2 and five from II/2 were ordered to attack German spearheads. Near Roye, Somme, they were intercepted by 10 Bf 109s. Each side lost two aircraft. At the same time Dewoitine D.520 from GC II/7 lost four in combat with Bf 109s over the Somme sector, although the fighters they were attacked by were probably from II./JG 53.

The next day Wick became the first pilot of the I. Gruppe to complete 100 combat missions, claiming his eighth and ninth victory the same day. For this achievement he was awarded the Iron Cross 1st Class (Eisernes Kreuz 1. Klasse) by Oberstleutnant Harry von Bülow-Bothkamp. By the end of the French Campaign, Wick's total stood at 14 confirmed victories, trailing only Hauptmann (Captain) Mölders of JG 53 with 25 victories and Hauptmann Wilhelm Balthasar of Jagdgeschwader 27 (JG 27—27th Fighter Wing) with 23 victories as the Luftwaffe's top scorer. On 8 June Wick claimed another pair of MB.151s near Reims. At the end of the French campaign, 3. Staffel headquarters moved into the villa Beaumont-le-Roger (of Louis Aston Knight) an artist who had fled a few days before the Germans arrived.

=== Battle of Britain ===
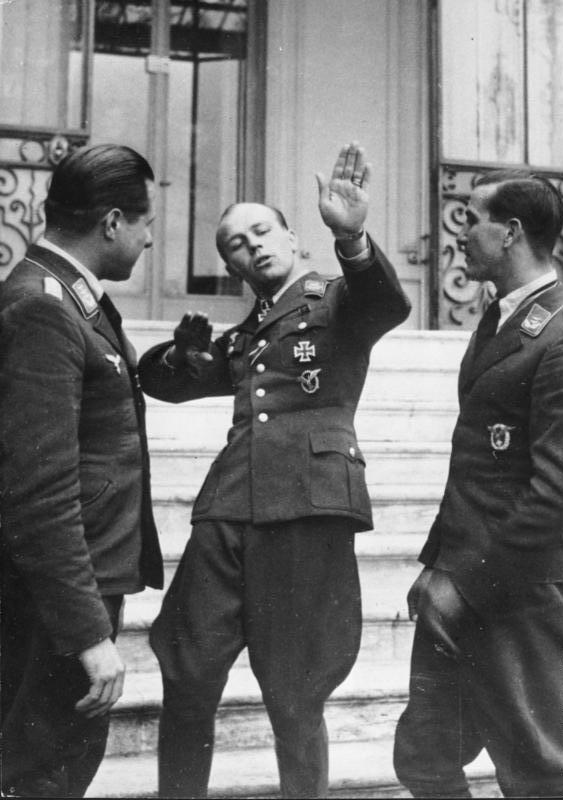
Joachim Seegert (left), Helmut Wick (centre), Erich Leie (right) on 6 October 1940

During the Battle of Britain against the Royal Air Force (RAF) in mid-1940, Wick rose quickly in rank and in profile, both in the battle zone and as a propaganda hero back in Germany where the authorities began an unsurpassed media campaign on his behalf. Wick became the most famous German pilot of the Battle of Britain because of it, surpassing Galland and Mölders. In the Kanalkampf phase of the battle, Wick claimed a Supermarine Spitfire on 17 July in the vicinity of the Isle of Wight. According to RAF Fighter Command records only two fighters were lost on this date. Flying Officer D. M. Taylor, No. 64 Squadron was shot down by Bf 109s and force-landed at Hailsham. The action was reported in the Beachy Head vicinity and no member of the squadron saw their assailants. Flying Officer C. D. Peel, No. 603 Squadron disappeared over the English Channel and was posted missing in action.

On 22 June 1940, before his promotion to Oberleutnant (first lieutenant), Wick became leader of 3. Staffel, succeeding Major Henning Stümpell. Wick claimed three RAF fighters on 11 August. JG 2 was involved in the large fighter escort operations against Portland. Fighter Command lost 30 fighters on 11 August defending the port and Channel convoys. JG 2 lost eight Bf 109s, four pilots killed, two missing and one wounded during the day's fighting. The fighter wing was known to have engaged No. 87 and No. 64 Squadron. No. 64 Squadron suffered a single Spitfire damaged, while No. 87 lost two Hurricanes destroyed and one damaged—one pilot, Flight Lieutenant R. V. Jeff was killed. No. 238 Squadron were involved in this particular battle; three of the Bf 109s lost in this engagement came from I./JG 2. Wick's claims inflated his tally to 17.

Wick recorded his 20th victory on 25 August and added two more fighters a day later. In so doing, JG 2 surpassed the 250-mark. Achieving 20 aerial victories made Wick eligible for the Knight's Cross of the Iron Cross (Ritterkreuz des Eisernen Kreuzes), a higher grade of the Iron Cross. Wick was awarded the Knight's Cross of the Iron Cross on 27 August 1940 at Karinhall by Hermann Göring. He was also interviewed by an Der Adler (Eagle—the Luftwaffe's weekly magazine) journalist prior to the presentation. Several articles about Wick appeared at the time. Wick appeared on the front page of Berliner Illustrirte Zeitung on 19 September. The combat on 25 August was fought against No. 609 Squadron. JG 2 lost two Bf 109s and a further one damaged. One Spitfire from 609 was damaged, and a further piloted by Flying Officer P. Ostaszewski was written-off when it crashed on returning to base. 13 RAF fighters were shot down or crash-landed during the evening air battles on 25 August. The following day Wick claimed two Hurricanes near Portsmouth at 17:30 and 17:35, CET. No. 43's Pilot Officer H. L. North parachuted from his Hurricane in the vicinity at 16:25. No. 234 Squadron suffered two Spitfires force-landed, one a wheels-up landing, after combat with Bf 109s near Portsmouth at approximately 16:30 to 16:40. 27 RAF fighters were destroyed this day with five more damaged.

Upon his return to France on 5 September, Wick was promoted to Hauptmann and briefly given command of 6. Staffel before on 9 September he was named Gruppenkommandeur (group commander) of I. Gruppe of JG 2. During September he continued adding to his score. On 8 September Wick claimed three fighters destroyed. Fighter Command reported only the loss of four in combat the entire day; all in dogfights with Bf 109s. The casualties were from 41, 605 and two from 46 Squadron. The losses were recorded from 12:05 through to 12:30 GMT. On the final day of the month Wick claimed two Spitfires near Portland at 12:30 and 12:35. No RAF fighters were recorded lost at the time and place of the claims, though 36 British fighters were destroyed or damaged [18 of each] during the fighting and several combats took place near Portland.

Wick began October with two Spitfires shot down on day one. JG 2 and Zerstörergeschwader 26 (ZG 26—26th Destroyer Wing) claimed six each. In reality four Hurricanes were lost; at least two were downed by ZG 26. On 5 October gained his 41st combat victory on his way to overtake his two closest rivals, Major Adolf Galland and Oberstleutnant Mölders. The 41st victory earned him his second reference in the Wehrmachtbericht on 6 October 1940. He also became the fourth member of the armed forces to receive the Knight's Cross of the Iron Cross with Oak Leaves (Ritterkreuz des Eisernen Kreuzes mit Eichenlaub). Wick's ace in a day haul on 5 October proved unique for a German aviator in the Battle of Britain. The first combat took place when Wick dived on a formation of nine 607 squadron fighters. Flight Lieutenants Blackadder and Brazin, Pilot Officer David Evans and Sergeant Richard Spyer were shot down. All nine Hurricanes suffered damage. German pilots claimed 11. Returning to base Wick claimed to have shot down three Spitfires over the Channel. No evidence has been found to confirm them on the British side. Wick received orders in the late afternoon of 6 October to report to Reichsmarschall Göring in Berlin by 3 p.m. the following day. Due to bad weather, he chose to drive from Normandy to Berlin by car. Together with his wingman and friend, Rudolf Pflanz, Wick travelled all night and arrived at the Reich Air Ministry right on time to meet with Göring, Field Marshal Erhard Milch, Generaloberst (Colonel General) Ernst Udet, General der Flieger (General of the Flyers) Kurt Student and General der Flieger Karl Bodenschatz. After the meeting in Berlin, Wick and Göring travelled to Berchtesgaden in Göring's personal train, where they arrived at 5 p.m. on 8 October for the official Oak Leaves presentation. Wick was then exposed by Otto Dietrich, the Third Reich's Press Chief, to the international public at a press conference and presented as a "hero". His performance left a predominantly negative impression, since Wick presented himself as a "busybody" (Life magazine), and made fun of his victims. Wick's remarks appeared in the 9 December issue of Life. Wick ridiculed British anti-aircraft artillery defences and implied British pilots were cowards.

=== Wing commander ===
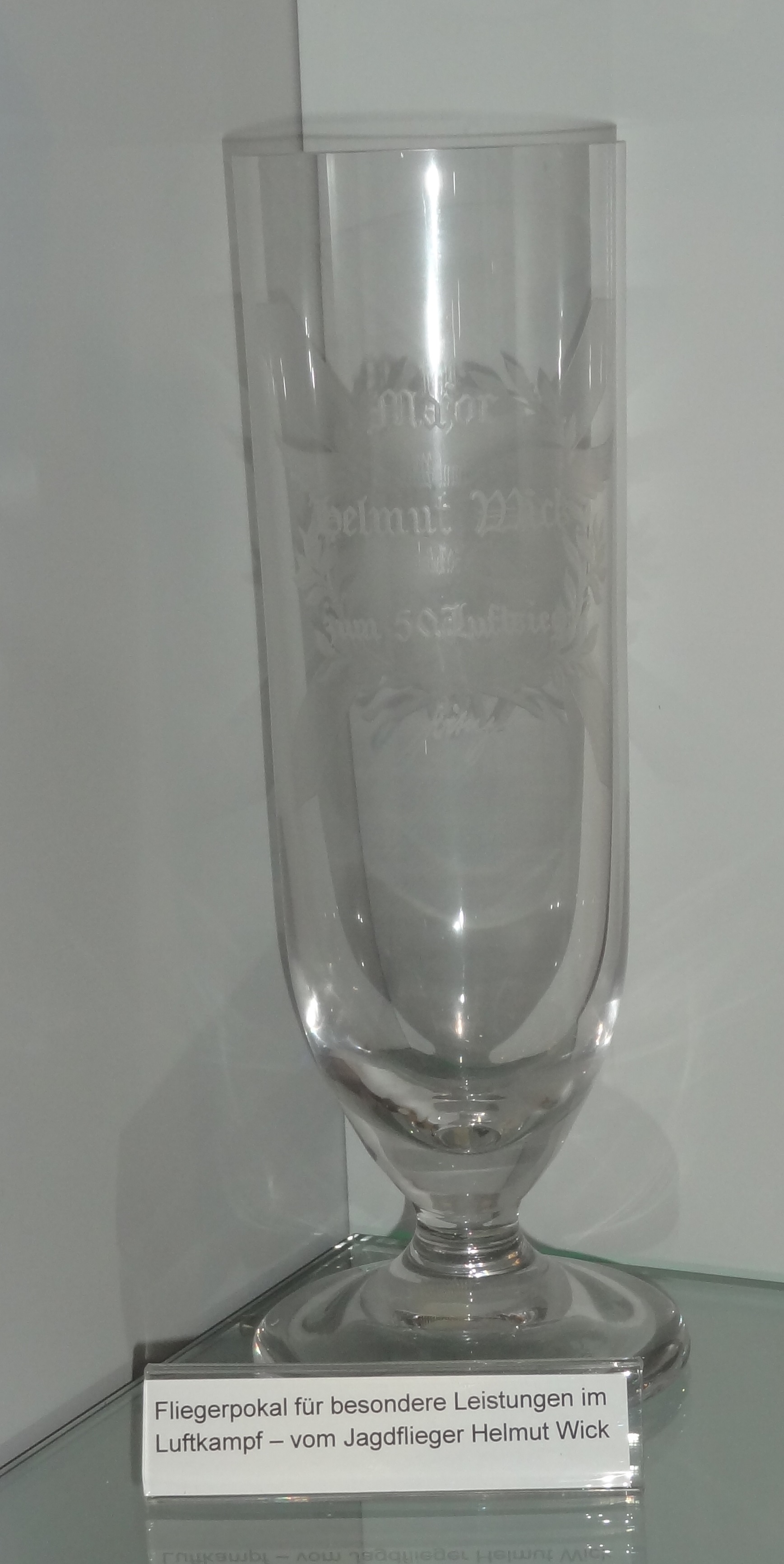
Wick's received this Fliegerpokal on account of his 50th victory. On display at the Aviation Museum Hannover-Laatzen.

On 19 October 1940, Wick was promoted to Major and appointed Geschwaderkommodore (wing commander) of JG 27. He had no ambition to leave his Gruppe in JG 2 "Richthofen" and, after giving the matter some thought, asked Göring to let him remain with his Gruppe instead. The next day Göring revoked his decision and gave Wick command of JG 2 "Richthofen". At 25 years of age, he thus became the youngest Major and Geschwaderkommodore in the Luftwaffe. Major Wolfgang Schellmann, who had commanded JG 2 since the beginning of September 1940, was placed in command of JG 27 instead of Wick. Command of I. Gruppe of JG 2 was then passed to Hauptmann Karl-Heinz Krahl. Wick's wing was chosen to stage southward, to provide an aerial escort to Hitler on his personal train as it journeyed to the French-Spanish border for the Meeting at Hendaye with Francisco Franco. Wick had claimed 49 at the end of October. Wick was vain and competitive, he wished to catch up and overtake Galland and Mölders, Wick's old instructor, and was prepared to fly more patrols and take more risks.

In November 1940 Wick continued to claim steadily. On 5 November he filed claims for another three RAF fighters northeast of Portland. Fighter Command suffered no losses in the region. The nearest loss was an Irish 238 Squadron pilot, Pilot Officer B. B. Considine, who baled out after combat near Bournemouth. On 6 November, JG 2 used Junkers Ju 87 Stukas as bait to lure the RAF into combat. The ploy succeeded and Wick claimed five aerial victories again. Wick's airmen claimed eight in total; five are confirmed by Fighter Command confirming the claims as reasonably accurate. One of Wick's opponents has been identified as Pilot Officer O. J. K. Haire, 145 Squadron, who was killed in action when his parachute opened too low. Sergeant J Webber baled out in the same action and survived. 213 Squadron Sergeant H. H. Adair was killed after being shot down by Wick. His remains were found when the fighter he was flying was excavated in 1979. The last Hurricane downed belonged to Pilot Officer J Tillett, 238 Squadron, who was killed in action with JG 2. JG 2 "Richthofen" claimed its 500th aerial victory on 16 November 1940.

=== Death ===
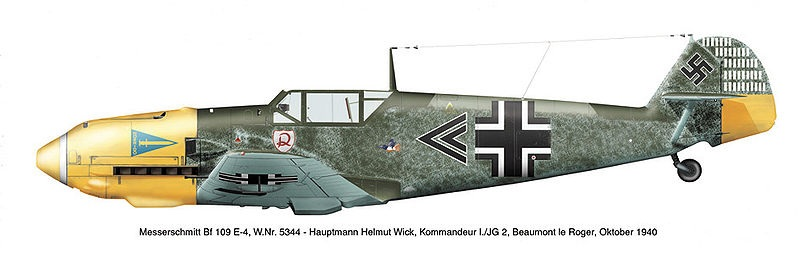
Bf 109 E-4 "Schwarzer Doppelwinkel", Werknummer 5344, flown by Major Wick, October 1940

Helmut Wick, accompanied by his Stabsschwarm—including Oberleutnant Rudolf Pflanz, Leutnant Franz Fiby and Oberleutnant Erich Leie — claimed his 55th aerial victory when he shot down a Spitfire on the afternoon of 28 November 1940. (Note: The book Helmut Wick—Das Leben eines Fliegerhelden (Helmut Wick—Life of a Flying Hero), published in 1943, was based in large part on Franz Fiby's diary. The prime author was Kriegsberichter (war correspondent) Josef Grabler. Grabler was killed in action on 21 May 1941 during the Invasion of Crete.) His opponent could have been No. 602 Squadron's Pilot Officer Archibald Lyall, who was reported killed in the engagement. This made Wick the highest-scoring fighter pilot in the Luftwaffe, surpassing Mölders, whose score at the time stood at 54 victories. It was a position which Wick would enjoy for only two hours. Returning from this mission to Cherbourg- Querqueville, Wick ordered the aircraft refueled and re-armed. Together with Leie as his wingman, Wick took off at 4:10 p.m. and returned to the vicinity of the Isle of Wight. Spotting a flight of Spitfires he climbed to intercept from a more favourable attack position. In a diving attack Wick shot down and killed Free French Pilot Officer Paul A. Baillon, of No. 609 Squadron, flying Spitfire R6631.

Wick was a real daredevil, He had excellent eyesight and therefore was usually the first to see enemy aircraft. Then he opened the throttle and simply went after them. I didn't do that, but that's probably why I'm still alive and he isn't.

— Franz Fiby—Wick's wingman in the Stabsschwarm

Shortly afterwards, around 5 p.m., Wick's Bf 109 E-4 (Werknummer 5344 — factory number) was shot down, probably by twelve–victory ace Flight Lieutenant John Dundas of No. 609 Squadron, though it is also possible that Wick fell victim to Pilot Officer Eric Marrs; Polish pilot Zygmunt Klein of No. 234 Squadron may have also scored hits on Wick's aircraft; he was also shot down and killed during the battle. Fiby and Leie saw the Spitfires diving to attack and managed to get out of the way, but lost track of Wick and Pflanz. Rudolf Pflanz saw a Spitfire shoot down a Bf 109, whose pilot bailed out. Pflanz then shot down the Spitfire, which he observed to crash in the sea with its pilot still inside. Pflanz later claimed Wick survived being shot down and watched him clamber into a dingy.

Only later did Pflanz find out that it was Wick he saw bailing out. Göring had ordered Kriegsmarine torpedo boats on a night-long search-and-rescue mission for Wick. The next day, other naval vessels and the Seenotdienst (air-sea rescue) service, escorted by fighters of JG 2, continued in vain to search for him. It has been claimed the Germans used international airwaves to contact the RAF Air Ministry for information on Wick's fate. He was never found, however, and the Luftwaffe declared him missing in action, presumed dead, on 4 December 1940, in the daily Wehrmachtbericht. Later German reports changed Wick's status to killed. Wick, on his 168th combat mission, was the first Oak Leaves recipient to lose his life in combat. The loss of the irreplaceable Wick had a detrimental effect on morale in JG 2. Combat fatigue has been attributed as the cause of Wick's death. The psychological and physical effects of combat fatigue earned the Channel area of operations the nickname Kanalkrankheit (lit. 'channel sickness').

== Family ==
On 5 August 1939, Wick married Ursel Rolfs (1916–1968) in Berlin. The marriage produced two children, Walter (born in October 1939) and a girl, Sabine, born after Wick's death, in February 1941. On 23 January 1941, Wick's father received a telephone call from Bodenschatz at the Führer Headquarters that Wick had been rescued and taken prisoner of war. Apparently an official Reuters report had indicated that a 25-year-old Luftwaffe Major, credited with 56 aerial victories, had been interned in a prisoner-of-war camp in Canada. Both Hitler and Göring initiated steps to get confirmation of the report. On 5 February 1941, a telegram from Ottawa informed Ursel that Wick was not interned in Canada. Ursel married the military doctor, Stabsarzt (equivalent to captain) Dr. Gerhard Tausch, later in the war.

== Summary of career ==
=== Aerial victory claims ===
According to US historian David T. Zabecki, Wick was credited with 56 aerial victories. Obermaier also lists him with 56 aerial victories claimed in 168 combat missions, all of which on the Western Front. Mathews and Foreman, authors of Luftwaffe Aces — Biographies and Victory Claims, researched the German Federal Archives and found records for 56 aerial victory claims, plus four further unconfirmed claims, all of which claimed on the Western Front.

Chronicle of aerial victories
This and the ♠ (Ace of spades) indicates those aerial victories which made Wick an "ace-in-a-day", a term which designates a fighter pilot who has shot down five or more airplanes in a single day. This and the – (dash) indicates unconfirmed aerial victory claims for which Wick did not receive credit.
Claim	Date	Time	Type	Location	Claim	Date	Time	Type	Location
– 3. Staffel of Jagdgeschwader 2 –
1	22 November 1939	12:20	Hawk-75	south of Bitche	10	8 June 1940	21:00	MB.151	southwest of Soissons
—	30 April 1940	—	Potez 63	vicinity of Trier	11	8 June 1940	21:10	MB.151	southwest of Soissons
—	17 May 1940	—	LeO 451	vicinity of Rethel	12	9 June 1940	21:35	Blenheim	northeast of Soissons
—	19 May 1940	—	Swordfish	vicinity of Calais	13	13 June 1940	21:10	Battle	Montdidier
—	19 May 1940	—	Swordfish	vicinity of Calais	14	17 July 1940	15:07	Spitfire	south of the Isle of Wight
2	20 May 1940	14:00	LeO 451	Cambrai/Saint-Quentin vicinity of Rethel	15	11 August 1940	11:30	Hawk-75	vicinity of the Isle of Portland
3	20 May 1940	14:05	LeO 451	Cambrai/Saint-Quentin vicinity of Rethel	16	11 August 1940	11:34	Spitfire	vicinity of the Isle of Portland
4	5 June 1940	17:17	MB.151	Ham/Péronne vicinity of Compiègne	17	11 August 1940	11:45	Hurricane	40 km (25 mi) near the Isle of Portland
5	5 June 1940	17:20	MB.151	Ham/Péronne vicinity of Compiègne	18	16 August 1940	14:35	Hurricane	east of Portsmouth
6	5 June 1940	17:25	MB.151	Ham/Péronne vicinity of Compiègne	19	25 August 1940	18:25	Hurricane	Isle of Portland
7	5 June 1940	17:30	MB.151	Ham/Péronne vicinity of Compiègne	20	25 August 1940	18:30	Spitfire	vicinity of the Isle of Portland
8	6 June 1940	12:17	MB.151	Ham/Péronne vicinity of Reims	21	26 August 1940	17:30	Hurricane	Portsmouth
9	6 June 1940	12:26	MB.151	Ham/Péronne vicinity of Reims	22	26 August 1940	17:35	Hurricane	Portsmouth
– 6. Staffel of Jagdgeschwader 2 –
23	5 September 1940	16:10	Spitfire	vicinity of Canterbury	26	8 September 1940	13:20	Hurricane	
24	6 September 1940	09:50	Spitfire	vicinity of Dover	27	8 September 1940	13:30	Hurricane	
25	7 September 1940	18:25	Spitfire		28	8 September 1940	13:40	Hurricane	
– Stab I. Gruppe of Jagdgeschwader 2 –
29	25 September 1940	14:30	Spitfire		36	1 October 1940	11:45	Spitfire	south of Swanage
30	26 September 1940	17:40	Spitfire		37♠	5 October 1940	14:58	Hurricane	south of Bournemouth vicinity of Southampton
31	27 September 1940	13:00	Spitfire	east of the Isle of Portland	38♠	5 October 1940	15:00	Hurricane	Bournemouth vicinity of Southampton
32	28 September 1940	15:40	Hurricane	Selsey Bill	39♠	5 October 1940	15:03	Hurricane	Bournemouth vicinity of Southampton
33	30 September 1940	12:30	Spitfire	vicinity of the Isle of Portland	40♠	5 October 1940	18:35	Spitfire	east of the Isle of Wight south of the Isle of Portland
34	30 September 1940	12:35	Spitfire	vicinity of the Isle of Portland	41♠	5 October 1940	18:40	Spitfire	east of the Isle of Wight south of the Isle of Portland
35	1 October 1940	11:40	Spitfire	south of Swanage	42	15 October 1940	13:45	Spitfire	Portsmouth
– Stab of Jagdgeschwader 2 –
43	29 October 1940	15:29	Hurricane	Portsmouth	50♠	6 November 1940	15:45	Spitfire	east of the Isle of Wight
44	29 October 1940	15:33	Spitfire	Portsmouth	51♠	6 November 1940	15:46	Spitfire	east of the Isle of Wight
45	5 November 1940	14:35	Hurricane	northeast of Portland	52♠	6 November 1940	15:48	Spitfire	east of the Isle of Wight
46	5 November 1940	14:37	Hurricane	northeast of Portland	53	7 November 1940	15:25	Hurricane	south of Portsmouth
47	5 November 1940	14:40	Spitfire	northeast of Portland	54	10 November 1940	15:43	Spitfire	east of Portsmouth
48♠	6 November 1940	15:35	Hurricane	Southampton	55	28 November 1940	15:10	Spitfire	northeast of the Isle of Wight
49♠	6 November 1940	15:37	Hurricane	Southampton	56	28 November 1940	17:13	Spitfire	Bournemouth vicinity of the Isle of Wight

=== Awards ===
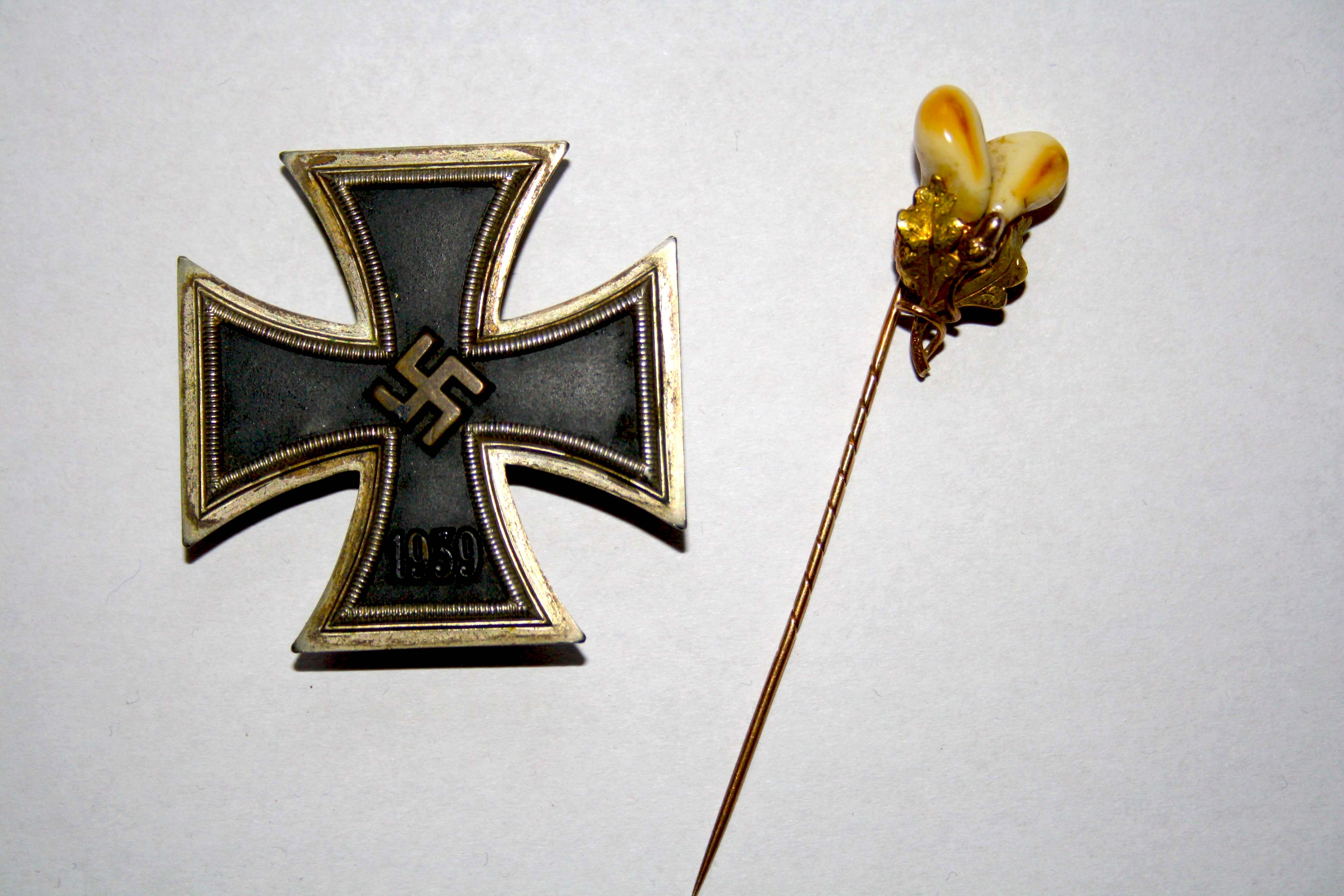
Wick's Iron Cross and Oak Leaves pin (family possession)

- Iron Cross (1939)
  - 2nd Class (21 December 1939)
  - 1st Class (6 June 1940)
- Pilot/Observer Badge in Gold with Diamonds
- Knight's Cross of the Iron Cross with Oak Leaves
  - Knight's Cross on 27 August 1940 as Oberleutnant and Staffelkapitän of the 3./Jagdgeschwader 2 "Richthofen"
  - 4th Oak Leaves on 6 October 1940 as Major and Gruppenkommandeur of the I./Jagdgeschwader 2 "Richthofen" (Note: According to Scherzer on 25 October 1940.)
- Five named references in the Wehrmachtbericht (26 August 1940, 6 October 1940, 8 November 1940, 16 November 1940 and 4 December 1940)

=== Dates of rank ===
8 November 1938:	Leutnant (Second Lieutenant)
21 July 1940:	Oberleutnant (First Lieutenant)
4 September 1940:	Hauptmann (Captain)
19 October 1940:	Major (Major)

== Notes ==
Military offices
Preceded by Major Wolfgang Schellmann	Commander of Jagdgeschwader 2 "Richthofen"; 20 September 1940 – 28 November 1940	Succeeded by Hauptmann Karl-Heinz Greisert
