= Rudolf Pflanz =

German World War II flying ace (1914–1942)

- Pflanz as an Oberleutnant
- Born: 1 July 1914; Ichenheim, German Empire
- Died: 31 July 1942 (aged 28); Berck-sur-Mer, German-occupied France
- Cause of death: Killed in action
- Burial place: Bourdon German war cemetery, France
- Military career
- Allegiance: Nazi Germany
- Branch: Luftwaffe
- Service years: 1935–1942
- Rank: Hauptmann (Posthumously)
- Unit: JG 2
- Conflicts: World War II: Battle of France; Battle of Britain; Defence of the Reich
- Awards: Knight's Cross of the Iron Cross

Rudolf Pflanz (1 July 1914 – 31 July 1942) was a German Luftwaffe fighter pilot and recipient of the Knight's Cross of the Iron Cross during World War II. Pflanz claimed 52 aerial victories, all of them over the Western Front.

== Early life and career ==
Pflanz was born in July 1914 in Ichenheim, present-day part of Neuried, at the time in Grand Duchy of Baden of the German Empire. He joined the Luftwaffe in 1935 and by 1938 was serving with Jagdgeschwader 131 (JG 131—131st Fighter Wing), which on 1 May 1939 was redesignated Jagdgeschwader 2 "Richthofen" (JG 2—2nd Fighter Wing).

== World War II ==
World War II in Europe had begun on Friday 1 September 1939 when German forces invaded Poland. Pflanz claimed his first aerial victory on 30 April 1940 during the early Phoney War period over a Potez 63 northwest of Merzig. At the time, Pflanz was serving with 3. Staffel (3rd squadron) of JG 2 which was commanded by Hauptmann Henning Strümpell. The Staffel was subordinated to I. Gruppe (1st group) of JG 2, based in Bassenheim and headed by Hauptmann Jürgen Roth.

During the Battle of Britain, Pflanz was wingman to Major Helmut Wick in the Stab (headquarters unit) of I. Gruppe of JG 2 and later with the Geschwaderstab of JG 2. On 28 November 1940, Pflanz probably shot down Royal Air Force (RAF) ace Flight Lieutenant John Dundas of No. 609 Squadron just after Dundas had shot down and killed Wick. By the end of 1940 Pflanz had eight victories.

On 23 July 1941 Pflanz claimed five Supermarine Spitfire fighters and a Hawker Hurricane shot down, and consequently claimed "ace-in-a-day" status. JG 2 claimed 29 RAF fighters that day with a further 10 credited to JG 26. Actual RAF losses amounted to 15 aircraft suggesting a high degree of over-claiming.

After recording his 20th victory he was awarded the Knight's Cross of the Iron Cross (Ritterkreuz des Eisernen Kreuzes) on 1 August 1941. He received the award from Feldmarschall (Field Marschal) Hugo Sperrle with fellow JG 2 "Richthofen" pilots Leutnant Egon Mayer and Oberleutnant Erich Leie on that day. The triple award presentation was recorded by the Deutsche Wochenschau (German Weekly Review), a newsreel series released in the cinemas.

On 5 October 1941, Oberleutnant Ulrich Adrian, the Staffelkapitän (squadron leader) of 1. Staffel of JG 2 was killed in action. In consequence, Pflanz was appointed Staffelkapitän of 1. Staffel in November.

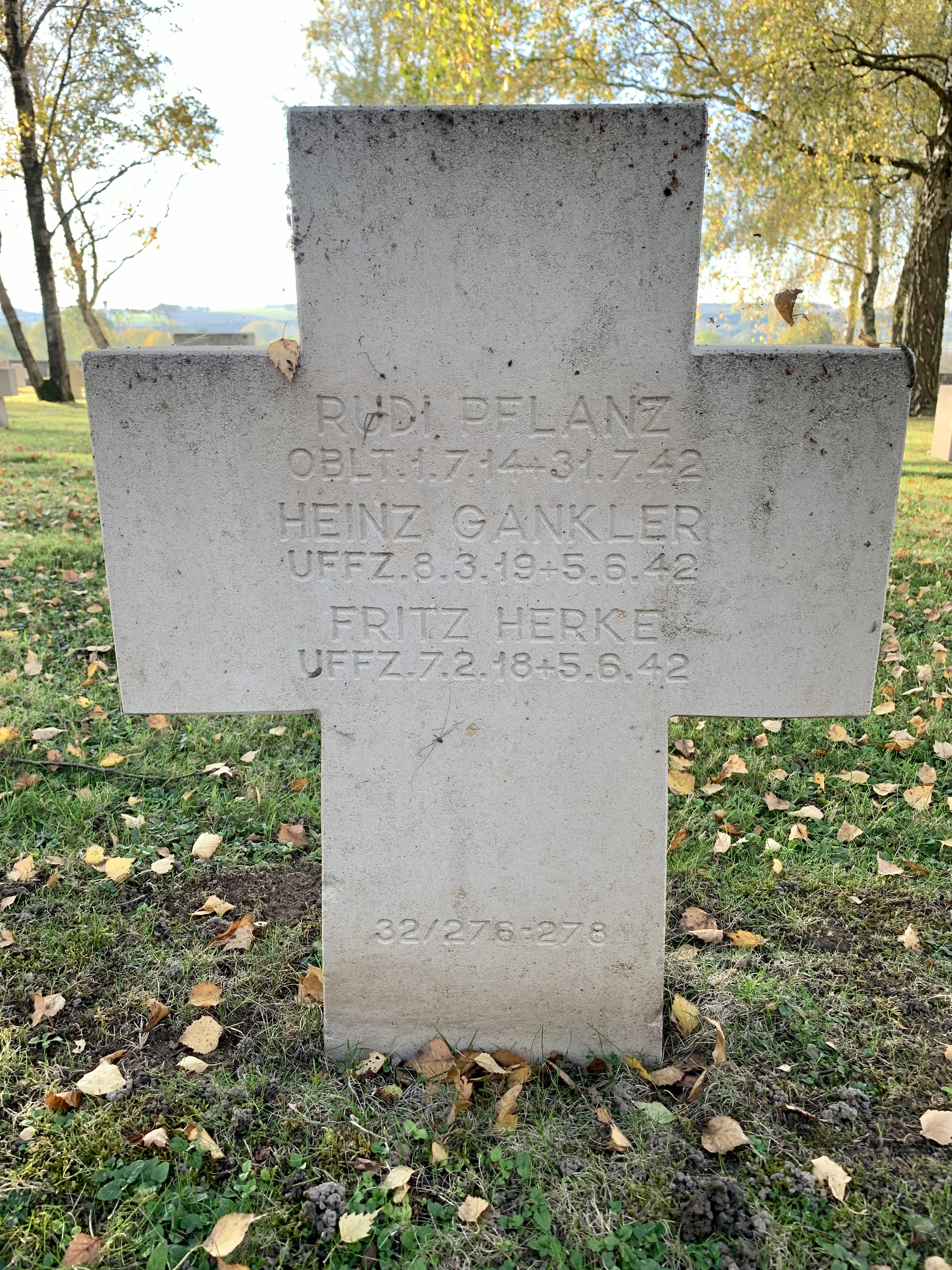
His grave at the Bourdon German war cemetery.

Oberleutnant Pflanz was appointed Staffelkapitän of 11. Staffel of JG 2 in May 1942, a special high-altitude unit equipped with the Bf 109G-1 fitted with pressurized cockpits. On 5 June he claimed three Spitfires downed over the Somme. On 31 July 1942, Pflanz was shot down and killed in action in his Messerschmitt Bf 109 G-1 (Werknummer 10318—factory number) south of Moncheaux. He was succeeded by Oberleutnant Julius Meimberg as commander of 11. Staffel. His victor may have been Sergeant William P. Kelly, an American pilot with the No. 121 (Eagle) Squadron. Pflanz is buried in the Bourdon German war cemetery, on the Somme.

== Summary of career ==
=== Aerial victory claims ===
According to US historian David T. Zabecki, Pflanz was credited with 52 aerial victories. Mathews and Foreman, authors of Luftwaffe Aces – Biographies and Victory Claims, researched the German Federal Archives and found records for 52 aerial victories, all of which claimed on the Western Front.

Chronicle of aerial victories
This and the ♠ (Ace of spades) indicates those aerial victories which made Pflanz an "ace-in-a-day", a term which designates a fighter pilot who has shot down five or more airplanes in a single day. This and the ? (question mark) indicates information discrepancies listed by Prien, Stemmer, Rodeike, Bock, Mathews and Foreman.
Claim	Date	Time	Type	Location	Claim	Date	Time	Type	Location
– 3. Staffel of Jagdgeschwader 2 "Richthofen" – "Phoney War" — 1 September 1939 – 9 May 1940
1	30 April 1940	19:20	Potez 63	northwest of Merzig					
– 3. Staffel of Jagdgeschwader 2 "Richthofen" – At the Channel and over England — 26 June – September 1940
2	11 August 1940	11:38	Hurricane	25 km (16 mi) off the Isle of Portland	3	5 September 1940	16:10	Spitfire	
– Stab I. Gruppe of Jagdgeschwader 2 "Richthofen" – At the Channel and over England — September 1940 – 21 June 1941
4	27 September 1940	13:08	Spitfire		5	30 September 1940	12:40	Spitfire	
– Stab of Jagdgeschwader 2 "Richthofen" – At the Channel and over England — October 1940 – 21 June 1941
6	29 October 1940	15:30	Hurricane	Portsmouth	8	28 November 1940	17:18	Spitfire	south of the Isle of Wight
7	29 October 1940	15:25	Hurricane	south of Portsmouth					
– Stab of Jagdgeschwader 2 "Richthofen" – Western Front — 22 June – November 1941
9	22 June 1941	16:09	Spitfire	Saint-Omer-Gravelines	18♠	23 July 1941	20:42	Spitfire	Hesdin-Berck
10	25 June 1941	12:55	Spitfire	vicinity of Boulogne-sur-Mer	19♠	23 July 1941	20:46	Spitfire? (Note: According to Mathews and Foreman claimed as a Hawker Hurricane.)	20 km (12 mi) southwest of Berck
11	3 July 1941	11:50	Spitfire		20	19 August 1941	12:20? (Note: According to Mathews and Foreman claimed at 12:24.)	Spitfire	over sea, north of Gravelines
12	10 July 1941	12:37	Spitfire		21	19 August 1941	12:24	Spitfire	north of Gravelines
13	22 July 1941	14:01	Spitfire	Hesdin	22	20 September 1941	16:40	Spitfire	
14♠	23 July 1941	13:20	Spitfire		23	21 September 1941	16:40	Spitfire	15 km (9.3 mi) east-southeast of Dover
15♠	23 July 1941	13:27	Spitfire	vicinity of Forest of Éperlecques	24	21 September 1941	16:45	Spitfire	15 km (9.3 mi) east of Dover
16♠	23 July 1941	13:29	Spitfire	vicinity of Forest of Éperlecques	25	13 October 1941	15:36	Spitfire	50 km (31 mi) west of Étaples
17♠	23 July 1941	20:38	Spitfire	west of Hesdin	26	26 October 1941	13:09	Spitfire	
– 1. Staffel of Jagdgeschwader 2 "Richthofen" – Western Front — 1 January – 30 June 1942
27	12 February 1942	15:37	Spitfire		38	19 May 1942	20:54	Spitfire	
28	12 February 1942	15:39	Spitfire		39	24 May 1942	19:16	Spitfire	
29	14 April 1942	12:52	Spitfire	vicinity of Caen	40	24 May 1942	19:24	P-40	
30	15 April 1942	14:32	Spitfire		41	31 May 1942	19:42	Spitfire	
31	15 April 1942	19:25	Spitfire		42	2 June 1942	11:01	Spitfire	Dieppe-Le Tréport
32	25 April 1942	11:17	Hurricane		43	2 June 1942	17:55	Spitfire	Dieppe-Le Tréport
33	28 April 1942	11:36	Spitfire	Gravelines	44	3 June 1942	16:49	Spitfire	vicinity of Le Havre
34	28 April 1942	11:36? (Note: According to Mathews and Foreman claimed at 11:38.)	Spitfire	Gravelines	45	5 June 1942	15:38	Spitfire	Baie de Somme-Abbeville
35	1 May 1942	19:33	Spitfire		46	5 June 1942	15:45	Spitfire	10 km (6.2 mi) north-northeast of Le Tréport
36	4 May 1942	19:38	Spitfire		47	5 June 1942	15:46	Spitfire	Baie de Somme-Abbeville
37	17 May 1942	14:03	Spitfire		48	11 June 1942	18:31? (Note: According to Mathews and Foreman claimed at 18:38.)	Spitfire	
– 11. Staffel of Jagdgeschwader 2 "Richthofen" – Western Front — 1–31 July 1942
49	26 July 1942	13:42	Spitfire		51	30 July 1942	19:32	Spitfire	
50	26 July 1942	13:43	Spitfire		52	31 July 1942	15:02	Spitfire	10 km (6.2 mi) south of Berck

=== Awards ===
- Iron Cross (1939)
  - 2nd Class (5 May 1940)
  - 1st Class (16 September 1940)
- Honor Goblet of the Luftwaffe (24 July 1941)
- Knight's Cross of the Iron Cross on 1 August 1941 as Oberleutnant and pilot 1./Jagdgeschwader 2 (Note: According to Scherzer as pilot in the Stab/Jagdgeschwader 2 "Richthofen".)
- German Cross in Gold on 16 July 1942 as Oberleutnant in the I./Jagdgeschwader 2
