= Julius Meimberg =

Fighter pilot and inventor (1917–2012)

- Born: 11 January 1917; Münster, Kingdom of Prussia
- Died: 17 January 2012 (aged 95); Münster, Germany
- Military career
- Allegiance: Nazi Germany
- Branch: Luftwaffe
- Service years: 1937–1945
- Rank: Major (major)
- Units: JG 2, JG 53
- Commands: 3./JG 2, 11./JG 2, II./JG 53
- Conflicts: See battles World War II: Western Front Battle of France Battle of Britain Defence of the Reich
- Awards: Knight's Cross of the Iron Cross
- Other work: textile industry travel agency owner

Julius Meimberg (11 January 1917 – 17 January 2012) was a German Luftwaffe military aviator during World War II, a fighter ace credited with 53 aerial victories—that is, 53 aerial combat encounters resulting in the destruction of the enemy aircraft—claimed in over 250 combat missions. In the 1960s, he invented an open-end spinning device and received patents in the US and Germany for it. In 1970, Meimberg founded the travel agency "Meimberg" and in 2001, he received the Rudolf-Diesel-Medaille for his achievements as an inventor.

== Early life and career ==
Meimberg was born on 11 January 1917 in Münster in the Province of Westphalia, a province of the Kingdom of Prussia. He was the sixth and youngest child of a textile merchant, owner of a company founded by his grandfather. Meimberg volunteered for military service in the Luftwaffe. Following acceptance, his military training began on 1 November 1937 at the Luftkriegsschule 2 (LKS 2—2nd air war school) in Berlin–Gatow.

== World War II ==
World War II in Europe had begun on Friday 1 September 1939 when German forces invaded Poland. On 6 December 1939, Meimberg was posted to Jagdgeschwader 2 "Richthofen" (JG 2—2nd Fighter Wing), named after World War I fighter ace Manfred von Richthofen, which at the time was based at Zerbst. At Zerbst, Hauptmann Wolfgang Schellmann was tasked with the creation of the new II. Gruppe (2nd group) of JG 2 on 15 December. The Gruppe was staffed by personnel from I. Gruppe of JG 2, I. Gruppe of Jagdgeschwader 3 (JG 3—3rd Fighter Wing), and newly trained fighter pilots from the fighter pilot schools. There, Meimberg was assigned to 4. Staffel (4th squadron), headed by Oberleutnant Hans Hahn.

Meimberg was appointed Staffelkapitän (squadron leader) of 3. Staffel of JG 2 on 15 April 1941. He replaced Oberleutnant Hermann Hollweg who was transferred. On 4 August 1942, Meimberg succeeded Oberleutnant Rudolf Pflanz as Staffelkapitän of 11. Staffel of JG 2. Pflanz had been killed in action on 31 July.

=== Mediterranean Theater ===
On 4 November 1942, Meimberg and his 11. Staffel received orders to immediately transfer to Sicily. That same day, 30 men and their equipment were flown in three Junkers Ju 52 transport aircraft from the airfield Poix-Nord at Poix-de-Picardie in France to Coleman Army Airfield, refueling at Reims. On 8 November, the Staffel arrived in Trapani, located in the northwest of Sicily, and then moved to Comiso which is in southeastern part of Sicily. On 15 November, Meimberg received orders to move his Staffel to Tunisia in North Africa where they were based at the Bizerte Airfield where they fought in the Tunisian campaign. That day, the Oberbefehlshaber Süd (Commander in Chief South), Generalfeldmarschall Albert Kesselring, ordered 11. Staffel disbanded, and its pilots and equipment assigned to II. Gruppe of Jagdgeschwader 53 (JG 53—53rd Fighter Wing). Due to Meimberg's intervention, Oberstleutnant Günther Freiherr von Maltzahn, the Geschwaderkommodore (wing commander) of JG 53, decided to retain 11. Staffel as its own entity and subordinated the Staffel to the Geschwaderstab (headquarters unit) of JG 53 while for the higher Luftwaffe authorities the Staffel was merged with 6. Staffel of JG 53.

On 17 December, Meimberg was given home-leave. During this vacation on 29 December, he married his fiancée Margret in Münster. The two had known each other since school. The marriage produced a son, Gerrit, born 15 February 1946, and another son, Helmut, born 11 August 1948, and their daughter Dorothee, born 19 October 1950. Following a brief honeymoon which the couple spent in Würzburg, Meimberg returned to his unit on 20 January 1943, which at the time was based at El Aouina, a municipality of Tunis, Tunisia.

Flying the Messerschmitt Bf 109 G-4 trop (Werknummer 16025—factory number) on 1 February 1943, Meimberg was wounded in aerial combat with Boeing B-17 Flying Fortress bombers near Pont du Fahs. The severe burns he sustained necessitated a lengthy stay in a hospital in Munich. During his convalescence, Meimberg was promoted to Hauptmann (captain) on 1 March, and awarded the Wound Badge in Silver (Verwundetenabzeichen in Silber) in May. He returned to JG 53 on 19 August and was assigned to the Geschwaderstab. By this date, 11. Staffel of JG 2 had officially been disbanded and its pilots distributed to various Staffeln of JG 53. The Geschwaderstab was based at the Hermitage of Camaldoli in Naples. Due to the Allied invasion of Italy, the location was abandoned on 9 September, moving to Littoria Airfield until September 16, and then to Centocelle Airfield near Rome. Shortly before Christmas, Meimberg left JG 53 again as his injuries sustained to his hands on 1 February required further treatment and skin grafting.

=== Defense of the Reich ===
On 24 April 1944, Meimberg was appointed Gruppenkommandeur of II. Gruppe of JG 53. He succeeded Hauptmann Gerhard Michalski who was transferred. On 24 October, Meimberg was awarded the Knight's Cross of the Iron Cross (Ritterkreuz des Eisernen Kreuzes) for 45 aerial victories. The presentation was made by Oberst Karl Hentschel, commander of the 7. Jagddivision (7th Fighter Division), at the Malmsheim Airfield.

Meimberg flew his last combat mission on 17 April 1945, strafing US vehicles travelling on the Autobahn near Nürnberg. During this attack, his Bf 109 G-14/AS was hit in the engine by anti-aircraft artillery. He was forced to bail out and landed safely in a field where he was picked up by a SS-unit and taken back to his unit at Rißtissen, located approximately 10 kilometers (6.2 miles) southwest of Ulm. On 22 April, Meimberg moved II. Gruppe to an makeshift airfield near Waal. Aerial operation had practically came to a stop as US forces had started crossing the Danube the following day. Meimberg dismissed his soldiers and disbanded II. Gruppe in the early morning on 27 April.

== Later life ==
Following World War II, Meimberg worked at the Nordhorn based textile company Rawe. There he gained knowledge of yarn production. In the summer of 1946, Meimberg and his wife bought two sheep. The sheep's wool was hand spun locally, inspiring Meimberg to think about automating the spinning process. Over the next months, he began experimenting and building a crude prototype for continuous yarn production, powered by a sewing machine motor, which he completed in 1948. Meimberg, presented his prototype to the German Patent and Trade Mark Office in Munich and the Deutsche Spinnereimaschinenbau AG Ingolstadt, the German spinning machine factory in Ingolstadt, owned by the Schubert & Salzer GmbH.

In 1970, Meimberg founded the travel agency "Meimberg" in Münster. For his achievements as an inventor, Meimberg was awarded the Rudolf-Diesel-Medaille in 2001. He died on 17 January 2012 in Münster.

== Summary of career ==
=== Aerial victory claims ===
According to US historian David T. Zabecki, Meimberg was credited with 53 aerial victories. Obermaier also lists him with 53 victories claimed in over 250 combat missions, all of which over the Western Front. Mathews and Foreman, authors of Luftwaffe Aces — Biographies and Victory Claims, researched the German Federal Archives and found records for 45 aerial victory claims, plus further 14 unconfirmed claims. All of these claims were achieved over the Western Allies, including four four-engined bombers.

Victory claims were logged to a map-reference (PQ = Planquadrat), for example "PQ 15 West TR-9". The Luftwaffe grid map (Jägermeldenetz) covered all of Europe, western Russia and North Africa and was composed of rectangles measuring 15 minutes of latitude by 30 minutes of longitude, an area of about 360 square miles (930 km^{2}). These sectors were then subdivided into 36 smaller units to give a location area 3 km × 4 km (1.9 mi × 2.5 mi) in size.

Chronicle of aerial victories
This and the ? (question mark) indicates information discrepancies listed by Meimberg, Prien, Stemmer, Rodeike, Bock, Mathews and Foreman.
Claim	Date	Time	Type	Location	Claim	Date	Time	Type	Location
– 4. Staffel of Jagdgeschwader 2 "Richthofen" – Battle of France — 11 May – 25 June 1940
1	19 May 1940	12:20	Hurricane	Tournai	2	3 June 1940	14:50	Curtiss	Épernay; Paris
– 4. Staffel of Jagdgeschwader 2 "Richthofen" – At the Channel and over England — 26 June 1940 – 21 June 1941
3	4 September 1940	14:05	Spitfire	Ashford	7	7 November 1940	15:30	Hurricane	south of the Isle of Wight
4	6 September 1940	10:00	Spitfire	Ashford vicinity of Ashford	8	28 November 1940	17:20	Spitfire	southwest of the Isle of Wight
5	6 September 1940	10:15	Spitfire	Ashford	9	29 November 1940	16:35	Blenheim	English Channel
6	10 October 1940	13:50	Hurricane	vicinity of Portland					
– 3. Staffel of Jagdgeschwader 2 "Richthofen" – On the Western Front — 22 June – 24 July 1941
10	3 July 1941	15:39	Spitfire		13	24 July 1941	14:45	Hampden	Brest
11	17 July 1941	16:17	Spitfire	north of Étaples	14	24 July 1941	15:00	Wellington	Brest
12	24 July 1941	14:24	Hampden	west-southwest of Plouguerneau					
– 3. Staffel of Jagdgeschwader 2 "Richthofen" – On the Western Front — 4 May – 1 August 1942
15	17 May 1942	10:27	Spitfire	30 km (19 mi) northwest of Dieppe	19	19 June 1942	21:01	Spitfire	Selsey Bill; Sidlesham
16	19 May 1942	15:22	Spitfire	Calais-Ramsgate	20	11 July 1942	18:25	Spitfire	Le Havre
17	31 May 1942	19:29	Spitfire	Saint-Valery	21	28 July 1942	21:15	Spitfire	southwest of Selsey Bill; 15 km (9.3 mi) southwest of Brighton
18? (Note: According to Mathews and Foreman this claim is unconfirmed.)	19 June 1942	20:58	Spitfire	Selsey Bill					
– 11. Staffel of Jagdgeschwader 2 "Richthofen" – On the Western Front — 1 July – 4 November 1942
— (Note: This unconfirmed claim is not listed by Prien, Stemmer, Rodeike and Bock.)	19 August 1942	—	Spitfire	Dieppe	22	20 August 1942	13:59	Spitfire	30 km (19 mi) north-northwest of Dieppe
—	19 August 1942	—	Spitfire	Dieppe	23? (Note: This claim is not listed by Mathews and Foreman.)	5 September 1942	—	Spitfire	
– 11. Staffel of Jagdgeschwader 2 "Richthofen" – Mediterranean Theater — 4 November – 31 December 1942
—	25 November 1942	—	Spitfire	southeast of Mateur	27	5 December 1942	09:08	Spitfire	1 km (0.62 mi) east of Mateur
—	3 December 1942	—	Spitfire		28	5 December 1942	09:12	Spitfire	2 km (1.2 mi) southeast of Mateur
24?	4 December 1942	15:50	Bisley (Blenheim)	southeast of Mateur	29	5 December 1942	11:03	Spitfire	10 km (6.2 mi) south of Mateur
25?	4 December 1942	15:53	Bisley (Blenheim)	east of Mateur	30	6 December 1942	10:15	Spitfire	20 km (12 mi) south of Tebourba
26?	4 December 1942	16:00	Bisley (Blenheim)	southwest of Mateur					
– 6. Staffel of Jagdgeschwader 53 – Mediterranean Theater — 1 January – 1 February 1943
31	31 January 1943	13:14	P-38	30 km (19 mi) east of Djedeida	32	1 February 1943	13:25	B-17	10 km (6.2 mi) northwest of Pont du Fahs
– Stab of Jagdgeschwader 53 – Mediterranean Theater — December 1943
33	9 December 1943	11:27	P-51	northwest of Valmontone					
– Stab II. Gruppe of Jagdgeschwader 53 – Defense of the Reich — 24 April – June 1944
34	8 May 1944	10:05	B-24	15 km (9.3 mi) north of Braunschweig	35	29 May 1944	12:15	B-17	Wittenberge
—	27 May 1944	12:15	P-51	vicinity of Nancy	36?	30 May 1944	11:15	B-17	
– Stab II. Gruppe of Jagdgeschwader 53 – Invasion Front in France — June – September 1944
37	17 June 1944	19:31	P-38	PQ 15 West TR-9; La Haye-du-Puits	—	23 August 1944	12:15	P-51	Mantes-la-Jolie
38	5 July 1944	10:42	P-47	PQ 04 Ost N/BD; Rambouillet	40	25 August 1944	19:25	Typhoon	PQ 05 Ost SC-8/7; Barentin-Rouen
39	5 July 1944	10:53	P-47	PQ 04 Ost N/AC; Nonancourt					
– Stab II. Gruppe of Jagdgeschwader 53 – Defense of the Reich — September – December 1944
41?	24 September 1944	12:40	C-47	PQ 05 Ost SR-7; Nackterhof	45? (Note: Prien in his 1991 book does not list this claim.)	17 November 1944	15:25? (Note: According to Mathews and Foreman claimed at 15:30.)	P-51	PQ 05 Ost UR-7; Linkenheim
42?	29 September 1944	—	P-47	vicinity of Edenkoben	46 (Note: This claim is not listed by Prien in his 1991 book. While according to Mathews and Foreman, this claim was confirmed.)	18 November 1944	12:35	P-51	Metz/Luneville; Karlsruhe
43	8 October 1944	10:42	P-47	PQ 04 Ost N/AO; Worms	47	16 December 1944	11:39	P-47	PQ 05 Ost S/UR-5, Herxheim near Karlsruhe
44?	13 October 1944	—	P-47		48	26 December 1944	—	P-47	south of Stuttgart
45	20 October 1944	10:45? (Note: According to Mathews and Foreman claimed at 10:42.)	P-47	PQ 04 Ost N/CP-6 southwest of Strasbourg	49	26 December 1944	—	P-47	south of Stuttgart
46	28 October 1944	11:05	P-47	Landau	50	26 December 1944	—	P-47	south of Stuttgart
—	29 October 1944	—	P-51						
– Stab II. Gruppe of Jagdgeschwader 53 – Defense of the Reich — January – May 1945
51	16 March 1945	—	P-51	Hunsrück area	53	13 April 1945	18:06	Spitfire	Biberach
52	10 April 1945	09:00	P-47	Crailsheim					

=== Awards ===
- Iron Cross (1939) 2nd and 1st Class
- Honor Goblet of the Luftwaffe (30 July 1941)
- Wound Badge in Silver (May 1943)
- German Cross in Gold on 29 October 1942 as Oberleutnant in the 11./Jagdgeschwafer 2
- Knight's Cross of the Iron Cross on 24 October 1944 as Hauptmann and Gruppenkommandeur of the II./Jagdgeschwader 53

== Publications ==
- Meimberg, Julius (2002). Braatz, Kurt [in German] (ed.). Feindberührung: Erinnerungen 1939–1945 [Enemy Contact: Memories 1939–1945] (in German). Moosburg, Germany: NeunundzwanzigSechs Verlag. ISBN 978-3-9807935-1-3.
