= Kanalkrankheit =

WWII German combat fatigue

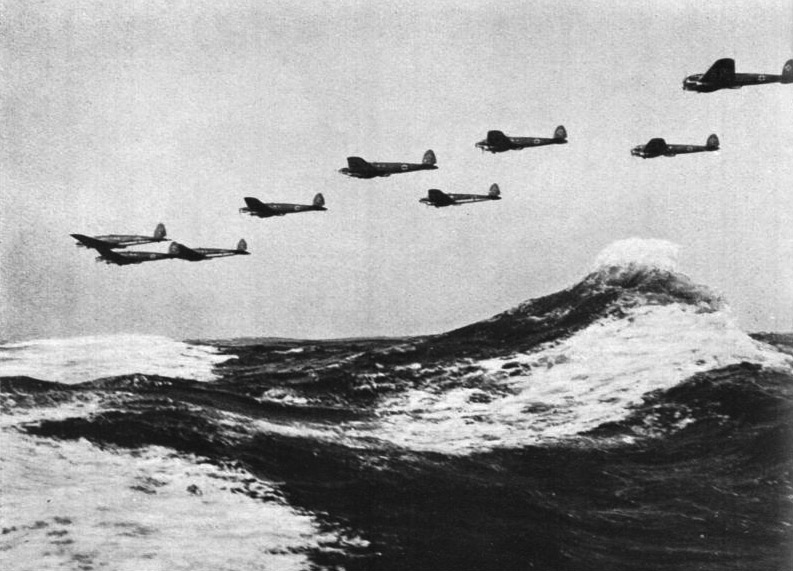
German Heinkel He 111 bombers over the English Channel 1940

Kanalkrankheit, or "channel sickness", was a form of combat fatigue which began to appear in the summer of 1940 among German pilots during the Battle of Britain. For crews of the Luftwaffe, operating at the edge of their combat range, bailing out over England meant certain capture, while parachuting out over the English Channel would often result in death by exposure or drowning.

== Symptoms ==
Many pilots suffered stomach cramps, or found themselves unable to eat. As combat wore on, the number of aircraft turning back to France owing to overheating engines, low oil pressure or instrument failure steadily increased. Pilots suffered mysterious bouts of appendicitis, or found other means to make their way to the sick bay.

== Causes ==
In reality, these medical ailments and equipment failures were symptoms of chronic stress, caused by extreme fatigue. There was no policy of R&R for German fighter pilots. They were expected to keep flying missions until they were captured, killed, or promoted.

Ulrich Steinhilper, a Luftwaffe ace, recalled at the end of August:

"Although most of us were still not outwardly showing major signs of nerves, arguments were becoming more frequent, tempers frayed quicker…The strain of unrelenting front-line flying was beginning to show."

Peter Stahl, a Junkers Ju 88 pilot, wrote in his diary on August 25:

"it is being said that the British are already on their last legs, but when you hear what the operation pilots - and particularly the bomber crews - have to report...the losses suffered by our bomber crews must be terrible."

Unteroffizier Werner Karl of the elite squadron Jagdgeschwader 53 wrote:

"There was no talk about fear or being taken prisoner. At least, nobody admitted if he was scared. All around us, we saw heroes both in the newspaper and on the radio. I think that everybody thought that he was the only one who was afraid. For example, our briefings were always held outside in the open air. Immediately after it finished and before we went to our planes, we all ran to the latrines and sat on the toilet. At first we thought it was sabotage but in fact it was fear."

Werner Karl was shot down and taken prisoner soon afterwards, on 2 September 1940.

Lone German aircraft struggling to return to France were easy prey for British fighters. The Germans call these attackers leichenfledderer - one who attacks corpses.

Morale steadily declined among the German crews as British resistance failed to evaporate. On September 11 the pilot of a bomber from Kampfgeschwader 26 squadron bailed out after being attacked by fighters. His observer, Leutnant F. Zimmerman was forced to seize the controls of the crippled aircraft, successfully making a forced landing at Dieppe.

These problems were exacerbated by internal conflict over strategy and tactics. The Messerschmitt Bf 109 fighter aircraft was faster than the British Supermarine Spitfire and Hawker Hurricane, especially in a dive, and had superior weapons. Yet pressure to defend the bombers in close escort caused this advantage to be thrown away. The fighter pilots were frustrated and morale began to drop. "By ordering us to fly as close escorts," recalled German fighter pilot Günther Rall, "our Gruppe was effectively offered up on a plate to the most efficient and determined aerial opponents the Luftwaffe has yet come against."

== See also ==
- Combat stress reaction
- Post traumatic stress disorder
