= Heinrich-Wilhelm Ahnert =

German World War II fighter pilot (1915–1942)

- Ahnert as an Oberfeldwebel; Note that the Knight's Cross at his neck is a photomontage
- Born: 29 April 1915; Altenburg
- Died: 23 August 1942 (aged 27); Koptevo, northeast of Oryol
- Cause of death: Killed in action
- Military career
- Allegiance: Nazi Germany
- Branch: Luftwaffe
- Rank: Oberfeldwebel (staff sergeant)
- Unit: JG 52
- Conflicts: World War II: Invasion of Poland; Battle of France; Eastern Front †
- Awards: Knight's Cross of the Iron Cross

Heinrich-Wilhelm Ahnert (29 April 1915 – 23 August 1942) was a German Luftwaffe military aviator during World War II. As a fighter ace, he was credited with 57 aerial victories, 4 over the Western Front and 53 over the Eastern Front, in an unknown number combat missions.

Born in Altenburg, Ahnert served as an aerial reconnaissance pilot during the Invasion of Poland and during the Battle of France. He was then trained as a fighter pilot and was posted to Jagdgeschwader 52 (JG 52—52nd Fighter Wing) in early 1941. He claimed his first aerial victory on 15 February 1941 on the Western Front. Following four further aerial victories in the west, his unit was transferred to the Eastern Front in late September 1941. He claimed his first aerial victories in this theater on 6 October during the Battle of Vyazma. Ahnert was killed in action on 23 August 1942 and posthumously awarded the Knight's Cross of the Iron Cross for 57 aerial victories.

== Career ==
Ahnert was born on 29 April 1915 in Ziegelheim near Altenburg in Thuringia of the German Empire. He originally served as an intelligence officer and aerial reconnaissance pilot and flew missions during the Invasion of Poland and during the Battle of France. (Note: Flight training in the Luftwaffe progressed through the levels A1, A2 and B1, B2, referred to as A/B flight training. A training included theoretical and practical training in aerobatics, navigation, long-distance flights and dead-stick landings. The B courses included high-altitude flights, instrument flights, night landings and training to handle the aircraft in difficult situations.) Ahnert was retrained as a fighter pilot and was posted to 3. Staffel (3rd squadron) of Jagdgeschwader 52 (JG 52–52nd Fighter Wing) in early 1941. At the time the Staffel was commanded by Oberleutnant Helmut Kühle who was replaced by Oberleutnant Helmut Bennemann on 27 April. I. Gruppe (1st group) of JG 52 to which 3. Staffel was subordinated was headed by Hauptmann Wolfgang Ewald at the time. Ahnert claimed his first aerial victory on 15 February 1941 when he shot down a Royal Air Force (RAF) Hawker Hurricane fighter near Ostend.

Until 21 February, the entire I. Gruppe was based at an airfield at Katwijk aan Zee in the Netherlands where it was tasked with patrolling the Dutch coast area and German Bight, the three Staffeln were then deployed at various airfields on the Dutch, German and Danish North Sea coast. On 25 May, I. Gruppe was placed under the command of Hauptmann Karl-Heinz Leesmann.

Ahnert claimed a Bristol Blenheim bomber shot down on 9 June 1941 and another on 26 August, and two Supermarine Spitfire fighters were claimed on 12 September 1941. The Blenheim bomber V6428 shot down 9 June belonged to force of six aircraft from No. 18 Squadron on mission to look for German shipping off the coast of Ameland, and Blenheim bomber R3767 shot down on 26 August north of Juist belonged to No. 82 Squadron. On 23 September, I. Gruppe was withdrawn from the Western Front and was sent to the Eastern Front. With stopovers at Dortmund, Magdeburg, and Warsaw, the Gruppe arrived in Orsha on 29 September.

=== War against the Soviet Union ===
On 22 June 1941, German forces had launched Operation Barbarossa, the invasion of the Soviet Union. Prior to its deployment on the Eastern Front, I. Gruppe was fully equipped with the Messerschmitt Bf 109 F-2. The Gruppe reached Orsha on 27 September before heading to Ponyatovka, located approximately 30 kilometers (19 miles) southwest of Roslavl, on 2 October. There, the Gruppe was initially subordinated to the Stab (headquarters unit) of Jagdgeschwader 27 (JG 27—27th Fighter Wing) and supported German forces fighting in the Battle of Vyazma as part of Operation Typhoon, the code name of the German offensive on Moscow.

I./JG 52 insignia

Ahnert claimed his first aerial victories on the Eastern Front on 5 October 1941 when he shot down two Polikarpov I-16 fighters northeast of Bely and later that day a Polikarpov I-153 fighter. Ahnert and his wingman Leutnant Otto Schlauch had shot down three I-16 fighters from 29 IAP (Fighter Aviation Regiment—Istrebitelny Aviatsionny Polk), one of which was piloted by Leytenant Vasily Migunov who was wounded in this combat. On 20 October, the Gruppe moved to an airfield named Kalinin-Southwest, present-day Tver, and located on the Volga, and to Staritsa on 31 October and then to Ruza located approximately 80 kilometers (50 miles) west of Moscow, on 3 November. Here Ahnert claimed two I-18 fighters, an early German designation for the Mikoyan-Gurevich MiG-1, on 14 November, an I-16 fighter on 27 November, a Kochyerigin DI-6 aircraft on 30 November. On 2 December, he claimed an aerial victory over a I-61 fighter, a reference to the Mikoyan-Gurevich MiG-3. The failed assault on Moscow forced I. Gruppe to retreat to an airfield at Dugino, present-day Novodugino, on 15 December where they stayed until 31 January 1942. He filed his last claim of 1941, his 15th in total, on 24 December over an I-16 fighter. Ahnert made his first claim in 1942 on 3 January over a Tupolev SB bomber. On 20 January, he claimed two Petlyakov Pe-2 bombers followed by an I-61 fighter on 26 January.

On 1 February 1942, I. Gruppe was withdrawn from combat operations and was moved to Smolensk and then further west to Orsha. From 8 to 12 February the Gruppe took a train to Jesau near Königsberg, present-day Kaliningrad in Russia, for a period of recuperation and replenishment where they received new Bf 109 F-4 aircraft. The Gruppe was ordered to Olmütz, present-day Olomouc in Czech Republic, on 11 April. On 17 May, I. Gruppe relocated to Artyomovsk, present-day Bakhmut. During this period, Ahnert was awarded the Honor Goblet of the Luftwaffe (Ehrenpokal der Luftwaffe) on 23 February. From Artyomovsk, JG 52 supported the German forces fighting in the Second Battle of Kharkov. Operating from Artyomovsk, Ahnert claimed his 20th aerial victory, an I-61 fighter shot down on 22 May. On 24 May, the Gruppe was ordered to relocate to Barvinkove located approximately 40 kilometers (25 miles) west of Sloviansk. In May, Ahnert claimed eight further aerial victories, taking his total to 28 claims.

On 1 June, the Gruppe then moved to an airfield at Grakowo, located approximately halfway between Kharkov and Kupiansk. On 14 June, Bennemann replaced Leesmann, who was transferred, as Gruppenkommandeur (group commander) of I. Gruppe of JG 52. In consequence, command of 3. Staffel was passed on to Leutnant Karl Rüttger. Fyling from Grakowo, Ahnert claimed nine aerial victories. On 26 June, the Gruppe moved to an airfield at Bilyi Kolodyaz, approximately 10 kilometers (6.2 miles) southeast of Vovchansk. Two days later, German forces had launched Case Blue, the strategic summer offensive in southern Russia. Ahnert claimed a Hurricane fighter shot down on 29 June.

On 1 July, I. Gruppe flew missions from Shchigry located 50 kilometers (31 miles) east-northeast from Kursk. That day, Ahnert claimed a Curtiss P-40 Warhawk fighter shot down. The next day, Rüttger became a prisoner of war and command of 3. Staffel transferred to Oberleutnant Rudolf Miethig. On 3 July, the Gruppe moved to a forward airfield near the village Novy Grinev located approximately 30 kilometers (19 miles) south-southwest from Novy Oskol and to Artyomovsk on 9 July. On 9 July, Ahnert claimed his 50th enemy aircraft destroyed when he shot down a MiG-1 fighter. For this, he was awarded the German Cross in Gold (Deutsches Kreuz in Gold) on 27 July. At the time, he was the leading fighter pilot of I. Gruppe.

On 2 August 1942, I. Gruppe was ordered to Kerch on the Kerch Peninsula. At the time, the Gruppe was moved around as a kind of fire brigade, deployed in areas where the Soviet Air Forces was particular active. The Gruppe then moved to Oryol on 15 August. On 23 August, Ahnert engaged Pe-2 twin-engine bombers in combat over Koptevo, approximately 50 kilometers (31 miles) northeast of Oryol. His Bf 109 G-2 (Werknummer 13508—factory number) "Yellow 9" was hit by return fire from the bomber gunners and he was killed in action. At the time of his death, Ahnert was behind Oberfeldwebel Berthold Graßmuck the second most successful fighter pilot of I. Gruppe. Ahnert was posthumously awarded the Knight's Cross of the Iron Cross (Ritterkreuz des Eisernen Kreuzes) that day.

== Summary of career ==
=== Aerial victory claims ===
According to US historian David T. Zabecki, Ahnert was credited with 57 aerial victories. Obermaier also lists Ahnert with 57 aerial victories claimed in an unknown number of combat missions. This figure includes 53 claims on the Eastern Front and four over the Western Allies. Mathews and Foreman, authors of Luftwaffe Aces — Biographies and Victory Claims, researched the German Federal Archives and found records for 57 aerial victory claims, 52 of which were on the Eastern Front and five on the Western Front.

Victory claims were logged to a map-reference (PQ = Planquadrat), for example "PQ 7051". The Luftwaffe grid map (Jägermeldenetz) covered all of Europe, western Russia and North Africa and was composed of rectangles measuring 15 minutes of latitude by 30 minutes of longitude, an area of about 360 square miles (930 km^{2}). These sectors were then subdivided into 36 smaller units to give a location area 3 km × 4 km (1.9 mi × 2.5 mi) in size.

Chronicle of aerial victories
This and the ? (question mark) indicates information discrepancies listed by Prien, Stemmer, Rodeike, Bock, Mathews and Foreman.
| Claim | Date | Time | Type | Location | Claim | Date | Time | Type | Location |
– 3. Staffel of Jagdgeschwader 52 – On the Western Front — 27 December 1940 – 23 September 1941
| 1 | 15 February 1941 | 13:45? (Note: According to Mathews and Foreman claimed at 13:05.) | Hurricane | Ostend north of Schiermonnikoog | 4 | 12 September 1941 | 14:14 | Spitfire | Den Helder |
| 2 | 9 June 1941 | 17:54? (Note: According to Mathews and Foreman claimed at 17:57.) | Blenheim | north of Ameland; 80 km (50 mi) northwest of Texel | 5 | 12 September 1941 | 14:16 | Spitfire | Den Helder |
| 3 | 26 August 1941 | 14:15 | Blenheim | north of Juist | | | | | |
– 3. Staffel of Jagdgeschwader 52 – Operation Barbarossa — 2 October – 5 December 1941
| 6 | 5 October 1941 | 12:10 | I-16 | northeast of Bely | 11 | 14 November 1941 | 15:12 | I-18 (MiG-1) | |
| 7 | 5 October 1941 | 12:11 | I-16 | northeast of Bely | 12 | 27 November 1941 | 10:45 | I-16 | |
| 8 | 5 October 1941 | 16:20 | I-153 | | 13 | 30 November 1941 | 13:03 | DI-6 | |
| 9 | 13 October 1941 | 14:47 | DB-3 | | 14 | 2 December 1941 | 12:07 | I-61 (MiG-3) | |
| 10 | 14 November 1941 | 15:05 | I-18 (MiG-1) | | | | | | |
– 3. Staffel of Jagdgeschwader 52 – On the Eastern Front — 6 December 1941 – 5 February 1942
| 15 | 24 December 1941 | 09:27 | I-16 | | 18 | 20 January 1942 | 08:49 | Pe-2 | |
| 16 | 3 January 1942 | 11:33 | SB-2 | | 19 | 26 January 1942 | 11:26 | I-61 (MiG-3) | |
| 17 | 20 January 1942 | 08:48 | Pe-2 | | | | | | |
– 3. Staffel of Jagdgeschwader 52 – On the Eastern Front — 19 May – 23 August 1942
| 20 | 22 May 1942 | 09:56 | I-61 (MiG-3) | | 39 | 1 July 1942 | 11:10 | P-40 | |
| 21 | 24 May 1942 | 17:52? (Note: According to Mathews and Foreman claimed at 15:52.) | I-61 (MiG-3) | PQ 7051 | 40 | 3 July 1942 | 18:30 | Hurricane | |
| 22 | 25 May 1942 | 09:23 | SB-2 | PQ 6082 | 41 | 3 July 1942 | 18:31 | Hurricane | |
| 23 | 27 May 1942 | 14:58 | I-26 (Yak-1) | | 42 | 3 July 1942 | 18:35 | Hurricane | |
| 24 | 27 May 1942 | 15:43 | Pe-2 | PQ 7057 | 43 | 4 July 1942 | 15:25 | R-5 | |
| 25 | 27 May 1942 | 15:45 | Pe-2 | 1 km (0.62 mi) west of Izium | 44 | 4 July 1942 | 18:27 | Hurricane | |
| 26 | 28 May 1942 | 09:55 | I-26 (Yak-1) | | 45 | 4 July 1942 | 18:35 | Hurricane | |
| 27 | 28 May 1942 | 09:57 | I-61 (MiG-3) | | 46 | 5 July 1942 | 10:18 | Hurricane | |
| 28 | 12 June 1942 | 10:58 | R-10 (Seversky) | | 47 | 6 July 1942 | 10:47 | Pe-2 | |
| 29 | 12 June 1942 | 17:21 | LaGG-3 | | 48 | 7 July 1942 | 10:51 | R-5 | |
| 30 | 13 June 1942 | 11:45 | LaGG-3 | | 49 | 9 July 1942 | 09:27 | I-16 | |
| 31 | 22 June 1942 | 12:58 | LaGG-3 | | 50 | 9 July 1942 | 16:33 | MiG-1 | |
| 32 | 22 June 1942 | 12:59 | LaGG-3 | | 51 | 2 August 1942 | 05:13 | LaGG-3 | PQ 66664 east of Saporoshskaja |
| 33 | 23 June 1942 | 15:12 | LaGG-3 | | 52 | 4 August 1942 | 05:20 | LaGG-3 | PQ 66651 vicinity of Malikut |
| 34 | 23 June 1942 | 15:46 | U-2 | | 53 | 8 August 1942 | 12:52 | LaGG-3 | PQ 76763 vicinity of Utasch |
| 35 | 24 June 1942 | 06:40 | LaGG-3 | | 54 | 8 August 1942 | 13:05 | LaGG-3 | PQ 76743 vicinity of Utasch |
| 36 | 24 June 1942 | 07:25 | R-5 | | 55 | 10 August 1942 | 16:37 | LaGG-3 | PQ 54192 |
| 37 | 26 June 1942 | 09:18 | R-5 | | 56 | 19 August 1942 | 08:16 | LaGG-3 | PQ 54192 |
| 38 | 29 June 1942 | 18:35 | Hurricane | PQ 71481 | 57 | 23 August 1942 | 06:45 | Pe-2 | PQ 64553 vicinity of Zubkowo |

=== Awards ===
- Iron Cross (1939) 2nd and 1st Class
- Honor Goblet of the Luftwaffe on 2 March 1942 as Oberfeldwebel and pilot (Note: According to Obermaier on 23 February 1942.)
- German Cross in Gold on 27 July 1942 as Oberfeldwebel in I./Jagdgeschwader 52
- Knight's Cross of the Iron Cross on 23 August 1942 (posthumous) as Oberfeldwebel and pilot in the I./Jagdgeschwader 52 (Note: According to Scherzer in the 3./Jagdgeschwader 52.)
