= Rudolf Miethig =

German World War II flying ace (1921–1943)

- Miethig as a Leutnant
- Born: 17 October 1921; Zwickau
- Died: 10 June 1943 (aged 21) near Krymskaja
- Cause of death: Killed in action
- Military career
- Allegiance: Nazi Germany
- Branch: Luftwaffe
- Service years: 1939–1943
- Rank: Hauptmann (captain)
- Unit: JG 52
- Commands: 3./JG 52
- Conflicts: See battles World War II: Eastern Front; Operation Barbarossa; Kuban bridgehead †
- Awards: Knight's Cross of the Iron Cross

Rudolf Miethig (17 October 1921 – 10 June 1943) was a German Luftwaffe military aviator during World War II, a fighter ace credited with 101 aerial victories—that is, 101 aerial combat encounters resulting in the destruction of the enemy aircraft. All of his victories were claimed over the Soviet Air Forces in an unknown number of combat missions.

Born in Zwickau, Miethig was trained as a fighter pilot and posted to Jagdgeschwader 52 (JG 52–52nd Fighter Wing) in early 1941. Fighting on the Eastern Front, he claimed his first aerial victory on 14 November 1941 during Operation Barbarossa, the German invasion of the Soviet Union. In July 1942, Miethig was appointed Staffelkapitän (squadron leader) of 3. Staffel (3rd squadron) of JG 52. Three months later, he was awarded the Knight's Cross of the Iron Cross on 29 October 1942. On 8 June 1943, Miethig was credited with his 100th aerial victory. Two days later, he was killed in action following a mid-air collision with an enemy aircraft over the Kuban bridgehead.

== Career ==
Miethig, who was born on 17 October 1921 in Zwickau, volunteered for service in the Luftwaffe in 1939. Following flight training, (Note: Flight training in the Luftwaffe progressed through the levels A1, A2 and B1, B2, referred to as A/B flight training. A training included theoretical and practical training in aerobatics, navigation, long-distance flights and dead-stick landings. The B courses included high-altitude flights, instrument flights, night landings and training to handle the aircraft in difficult situations.) he was transferred to the 3. Staffel (3rd squadron) of Jagdgeschwader 52 (JG 52—52nd Fighter Wing) in the spring of 1941. At the time the Staffel was commanded by Oberleutnant Helmut Kühle who was replaced by Oberleutnant Helmut Bennemann on 27 April. I. Gruppe (1st group) of JG 52 to which 3. Staffel was subordinated was headed by Hauptmann Wolfgang Ewald at the time. Until 21 February, the entire I. Gruppe was based at an airfield at Katwijk aan Zee in the Netherlands where it was tasked with patrolling the Dutch coast area and German Bight, the three Staffeln were then deployed at various airfields on the Dutch, German and Danish North Sea coast.

On 25 May, I. Gruppe was placed under the command of Hauptmann Karl-Heinz Leesmann. On 23 September, I. Gruppe was withdrawn from the Western Front and was sent to the Eastern Front where it would be based at an airfield at Ponyatovka, located approximately 30 kilometers (19 miles) southwest of Roslavl.

=== War against the Soviet Union ===
I./JG 52 insignia

On 22 June, German forces had launched Operation Barbarossa, the invasion of the Soviet Union. Prior to its deployment on the Eastern Front, I. Gruppe was fully equipped with the Messerschmitt Bf 109 F-2. The Gruppe reached Orsha on 27 September before heading to Ponyatovka on 2 October. There, the Gruppe was initially subordinated to the Stab (headquarters unit) of Jagdgeschwader 27 (JG 27—27th Fighter Wing) and supported German forces fighting in the Battle of Vyazma as part of Operation Typhoon, the code name of the German offensive on Moscow. On 20 October, the Gruppe moved to an airfield named Kalinin-Southwest, present-day Tver, and located on the Volga, and to Staritsa on 31 October and then to Ruza located approximately 80 kilometers (50 miles) west of Moscow, on 3 November. Here, Miethig claimed his first aerial victory, a Mikoyan-Gurevich MiG-1, on 14 November 1941 and his second victory, an I-61 fighter, an early German designation for the Mikoyan-Gurevich MiG-3, on 27 November. The failed assault on Moscow forced I. Gruppe to retreat to an airfield at Dugino, present-day Novodugino, on 15 December where they stayed until 31 January 1942. Here, Miethig claimed a Polikarpov R-5 reconnaissance bomber on 28 January.

On 1 February. I Gruppe was withdrawn from combat operations and was moved to Smolensk and then further west to Orsha. From 8 to 12 February the Gruppe took a train to Jesau near Königsberg, present-day Kaliningrad in Russia, for a period of recuperation and replenishment where they received new Bf 109 F-4 aircraft. The Gruppe was ordered to Olmütz, present-day Olomouc in Czech Republic on 11 April. On 17 May, I. Gruppe relocated to Artyomovsk, present-day Bakhmut. From Artyomovsk, JG 52 supported the German forces fighting in the Second Battle of Kharkov. On 24 May, the Gruppe was ordered to relocate to Barvinkove located approximately 40 kilometers (25 miles) west of Sloviansk. Here, Miethig claimed four further aerial victories by the end of May, including a Petlyakov Pe-2 bomber on 26 May, a MiG-1 fighter and an Ilyushin Il-2 ground-attack aircraft on 29 May, and another Il-2 ground-attack aircraft on 31 May.

On 1 June, the Gruppe then moved to an airfield at Grakowo, located approximately halfway between Kharkov and Kupiansk. On 13 June, Miethig claimed two Yakovlev Yak-1 fighters shot down. The next day, Bennemann replaced Leesmann, who was transferred, as Gruppenkommandeur (group commander) of I. Gruppe of JG 52. In consequence, command of 3. Staffel was passed on to Leutnant Karl Rüttger. Miethig claimed a Soviet flown Hawker Hurricane fighter on 23 June followed by a Lavochkin-Gorbunov-Gudkov LaGG-3 fighter the next day. Two days later, the Gruppe moved to an airfield at Bilyi Kolodyaz, approximately 10 kilometers (6.2 miles) southeast of Vovchansk. On 28 June, German forces had launched Case Blue, the strategic summer offensive in southern Russia. The next day, he claimed another Hurricane fighter followed by a LaGG-3 fighter on 30 June. On 1 July, I. Gruppe flew missions from Shchigry located 50 kilometers (31 miles) east-northeast from Kursk.

=== Squadron leader ===
On 2 July, Miethig was appointed Staffelkapitän (squadron leader) of the 3. Staffel of JG 52. He replaced Rüttger who had become a prisoner of war after he made a forced landing behind enemy lines near Kruty the day before. On 3 July, the Gruppe moved to a forward airfield near the village Novy Grinev located approximately 30 kilometers (19 miles) south-southwest from Novy Oskol and to Artyomovsk on 9 July. During this period, Miethig had claimed a Hurricane fighter on 4 July and a R-5 reconnaissance bomber on 8 July. On 10 July, Miethig claimed a MiG-1 fighter. According to Obermaier, Miethig had been awarded the Honor Goblet of the Luftwaffe (Ehrenpokal der Luftwaffe) on 6 July. Patzwall however dates the presentation of Honor Goblet on 19 October. On 2 August, I. Gruppe was ordered to Kerch on the Kerch Peninsula. At the time, the Gruppe was moved around as a kind of fire brigade, deployed in areas where the Soviet Air Forces was particular active. The Gruppe then moved to Oryol on 15 August. There, Miethig claimed an I-180 fighter, a designation for the Yakovlev Yak-7, on 18 August and two Pe-2 bombers on 23 August.

The following day, I. Gruppe moved to Dedjurewo near Rzhev in the central sector of the Eastern Front where the Gruppe was subordinated to Jagdgeschwader 51 (JG 51—51st Fighter Wing), fighting in the Battle of Rzhev. On 29 October 1942, Miethig and Leutnant Walter Krupinski from 6. Staffel were awarded the Knight's Cross of the Iron Cross (Ritterkreuz des Eisernes Kreuzes). On 10 February 1943, I. Gruppe moved to Poltava where they stayed until 10 March. Here he increased his number of aerial victories to 57 by end-February, making him the second most successful fighter pilot of I. Gruppe. On 24 May, the Gruppe moved to an airfield at Gostagaevskaya located approximately 20 kilometers (12 miles) northeast Anapa. Here on 8 June, Miethig was credited with his 100th aerial victory. He was the 41st Luftwaffe pilot to achieve the century mark.

Miethig was killed in a crash following combat with Yak-1 fighters on 10 June 1943 roughly 10 kilometres (6.2 mi) north-east of Krymskaya, over the Kuban bridgehead. Miethig, flying Bf 109 G-2 (Werknummer 14 602—factory number), had shot down one of the Yak-1 fighters and collided with his crashing opponent. Miethig was posthumously awarded the German Cross in Gold (Deutsches Kreuz in Gold) as well as posthumously promoted to Hauptmann (captain). Leutnant Johann-Hermann Meier temporarily was given command of 3. Staffel until Hauptmann Erich Schreiber was officially appointed Staffelkapitän on 15 July. (Note: According to Schreier, command of 3. Staffel was given to Oberleutnant Franz Woidich.)

== Summary of career ==
=== Aerial victory claims ===
According to US historian David T. Zabecki, Miethig was credited with 101 aerial victories. Schreier and Spick also list Miethig with 101 aerial victories claimed in an unknown number of combat missions. Mathews and Foreman, authors of Luftwaffe Aces — Biographies and Victory Claims, researched the German Federal Archives and state that Miethig was credited with 100 aerial victories, all of which claimed on the Eastern Front.

Victory claims were logged to a map-reference (PQ = Planquadrat), for example "PQ 47852". The Luftwaffe grid map (Jägermeldenetz) covered all of Europe, western Russia and North Africa and was composed of rectangles measuring 15 minutes of latitude by 30 minutes of longitude, an area of about 360 square miles (930 km^{2}). These sectors were then subdivided into 36 smaller units to give a location area 3 km × 4 km (1.9 mi × 2.5 mi) in size.

Chronicle of aerial victories
This and the ? (question mark) indicates information discrepancies listed by Prien, Stemmer, Rodeike, Bock, Mathews and Foreman.
Claim	Date	Time	Type	Location	Claim	Date	Time	Type	Location
– 3. Staffel of Jagdgeschwader 52 – Operation Barbarossa — 2 October – 5 December 1941
1	14 November 1941	15:08	I-18 (MiG-1)		2	27 November 1941	12:58	I-61 (MiG-3)	
– 3. Staffel of Jagdgeschwader 52 – Eastern Front — 6 December 1941 – 30 April 1942
3	28 January 1942	09:38	R-5						
– 3. Staffel of Jagdgeschwader 52 – 19 May 1942 – 3 February 1943
4	26 May 1942	16:16	Pe-2		30	11 September 1942	16:16	P-39	PQ 47852
5	29 May 1942	10:48	MiG-1		31	14 September 1942	17:10	LaGG-3	PQ 47732
6	29 May 1942	11:03	Il-2		32	14 September 1942	17:21	Il-2	PQ 47594
7	31 May 1942	14:40	Il-2	12 km (7.5 mi) east of Wodjany Airfield	33	16 September 1942	09:52	R-5	PQ 47361
8	13 June 1942	11:38	Yak-1		34	26 September 1942	06:10	P-39? (Note: Mathews and Foreman claimed over a Hawker Hurricane.)	PQ 30124
9	13 June 1942	11:40	Yak-1		35	27 September 1942	11:00? (Note: According to Mathews and Foreman claimed at 11:03.)	Yak-1	PQ 40391
10	23 June 1942	17:32	Hurricane		36	30 September 1942	14:12	Il-2	PQ 49433 vicinity of Srednyaya Akhtuba
11	24 June 1942	06:42	LaGG-3		37	2 October 1942	13:40	I-153	PQ 49293; 40 km (25 mi) east of Stalingrad
12	29 June 1942	18:36	Hurricane	PQ 71481	38	2 October 1942	13:43	I-153	PQ 49293; 40 km (25 mi) east of Stalingrad
13	30 June 1942	08:53? (Note: According to Mathews and Foreman claimed at 15:10 over an Ilyushin Il-2.)	LaGG-3	PQ 71622	39	2 October 1942	13:46	I-16	PQ 49421 vicinity of Srednyaya Akhtuba
14	4 July 1942	18:27	Hurricane		40	2 October 1942	13:47	I-16	PQ 49431 vicinity of Srednyaya Akhtuba
15	8 July 1942	11:56	R-5		41	3 October 1942	13:46	Yak-1? (Note: Mathews and Foreman claimed over a Lavochkin-Gorbunov-Gudkov LaGG-3.)	PQ 50743
16	10 July 1942	09:50	MiG-1		42	4 October 1942	14:58	Il-2	PQ 59321
17	18 August 1942	17:01	I-180 (Yak-7)	PQ 54161 vicinity of Duminichi	43	4 October 1942	14:59	Il-2	PQ 59321
18	23 August 1942	06:44? (Note: According to Mathews and Foreman claimed at 06:34.)	Pe-2	PQ 54294 northwest of Bolkhov	44	9 October 1942	14:24	SB-2	PQ 49264; 35–40 km (22–25 mi) east of Stalingrad
19	23 August 1942	06:46	Pe-2	PQ 54461 vicinity of Uljanowo	45	12 October 1942	13:07	Yak-1	PQ 58544
20	31 August 1942	11:06	LaGG-3	PQ 47813	46	16 October 1942	13:03	Yak-1	PQ 49291; 40 km (25 mi) east of Stalingrad
21	31 August 1942	11:09	LaGG-3	PQ 47811	47	16 October 1942	13:04	Yak-1	PQ 49291; 40 km (25 mi) east of Stalingrad
22	2 September 1942	16:36	LaGG-3	PQ 56414, Garetewo	48	16 October 1942	13:12	Yak-1	PQ 49263; 35–40 km (22–25 mi) east of Stalingrad
23	3 September 1942	14:34	LaGG-3	PQ 4424	49	16 October 1942	13:18	Yak-1	PQ 49283; 20–30 km (12–19 mi) east of Stalingrad
24	5 September 1942	15:42	Il-2	PQ 46812	50	24 October 1942	13:44	Yak-1	PQ 49231; 20–30 km (12–19 mi) east of Stalingrad
25	5 September 1942	15:43	Il-2	PQ 46812	51	25 October 1942	14:43	Yak-1	PQ 49273; 15 km (9.3 mi) east of Stalingrad
26	6 September 1942	15:15	LaGG-3	PQ 4327	52	31 October 1942	13:10	LaGG-3	PQ 49424; 25 km (16 mi) east of Stalingrad
27? (Note: Mathews and Foreman do not list this claim over a tethered balloon.)	9 September 1942	12:12	tethered balloon	PQ 4782	53	1 November 1942	12:59	LaGG-3	PQ 49293; 40 km (25 mi) east of Stalingrad
28	10 September 1942	10:21	Yak-1	PQ 47674	54	1 November 1942	13:04	LaGG-3	PQ 59141
29	11 September 1942	16:13	I-153? (Note: Mathews and Foreman claimed over a Yakovlev Yak-7.)	PQ 47882					
– 3. Staffel of Jagdgeschwader 52 – 4 February 1943 – 10 June 1943
55	12 February 1943	15:43	U-2	PQ 35 Ost 61554; 20 km (12 mi) northeast of Zolochiv	79	7 May 1943	18:32	LaGG-3	PQ 35 Ost 70112, 15 km (9.3 mi) east of Martowaja
56	28 February 1943	09:17	Il-2	PQ 35 Ost 40454	80	14 May 1943	17:47	P-39	PQ 35 Ost 61251; 15 km (9.3 mi) southeast of Prokhorovka
57	28 February 1943	09:18	Il-2 m.H. (Note: The "m.H." refers to an Ilyushin Il-2 with rear gunner (mit Heckschütze).)	PQ 35 Ost 40454	81	16 May 1943	15:13	P-39	PQ 34 Ost 86586 east of Slavyansk-na-Kubani
58	5 March 1943	14:18	La-5	PQ 35 Ost 50251; 20 km (12 mi) south-southwest of Olshany	82	25 May 1943	05:50	Yak-1	PQ 34 Ost 85514; Black Sea, south of Gelendzhik
59	5 March 1943	14:19	La-5	PQ 35 Ost 50242; 25 km (16 mi) southwest of Olshany	83	26 May 1943	10:55? (Note: According to Mathews and Foreman claimed at 10:56.)	Yak-1	PQ 34 Ost 75234 vicinity of Krymsk
60	20 March 1943	10:45? (Note: According to Mathews and Foreman claimed at 06:45.)	Il-2 m.H.	PQ 35 Ost 71852; 25 km (16 mi) west-southwest of Valuyki	84	27 May 1943	08:12	La-5	PQ 34 Ost 76892 vicinity of Kijewskoje
61	26 March 1943	09:12? (Note: According to Mathews and Foreman claimed at 09:13.)	MiG-3	PQ 35 Ost 71794; 25 km (16 mi) southeast of Kolodez	85	27 May 1943	08:50? (Note: According to Mathews and Foreman claimed at 08:05.)	Spitfire	PQ 34 Ost 76863 north of Kecskemét
62	29 March 1943	17:04	La-5	PQ 35 Ost 61453; 15 km (9.3 mi) northeast of Belgorod	86	27 May 1943	17:47	Yak-1	PQ 34 Ost 76864 north of Kecskemét
63	9 April 1943	07:30	LaGG-3	PQ 34 Ost 85114, east of Krymskaya; Black Sea, south of Gelendzhik	87	28 May 1943	10:45	Yak-1	PQ 34 Ost 76863 north of Kecskemét
64	11 April 1943	11:55	P-39	PQ 34 Ost 85711, 6 km (3.7 mi) northeast of Krymskaya	88	28 May 1943	10:53	Yak-1	PQ 34 Ost 76892 vicinity of Kijewskoje
65	16 April 1943	11:22	P-39	PQ 34 Ost 86713 southwest of Tamanj	89	28 May 1943	17:12	P-39	PQ 34 Ost 76861 north of Kecskemét
66	17 April 1943	09:13	LaGG-3	PQ 34 Ost 75452; 8 km (5.0 mi) south of Novorossiysk	90	29 May 1943	12:50	Spitfire	PQ 34 Ost 76221 southeast of Varenikovskaya
67	18 April 1943	16:25? (Note: According to Mathews and Foreman claimed at 16:28.)	LaGG-3	PQ 34 Ost 75461; Black Sea, 5 km (3.1 mi) west of Kabardinka	91	29 May 1943	17:22	La-5	PQ 34 Ost 76231 vicinity of Krymsk
68	20 April 1943	08:22	Yak-1	PQ 34 Ost 85312, east of Novorossiysk vicinity of Schapssugskaja	92	30 May 1943	16:12	La-5	PQ 34 Ost 75232 north of Krymsk
69	20 April 1943	08:30	Yak-1	PQ 34 Ost 75431; 8 km (5.0 mi) southeast of Novorossiysk	93	30 May 1943	16:29	Spitfire	PQ 34 Ost 76833 vicinity of Anastasiewskaja
70	24 April 1943	16:42	P-39	PQ 34 Ost 75452, Novorossiysk; 8 km (5.0 mi) south of Novorossiysk	94	31 May 1943	17:47	Yak-1	PQ 34 Ost 76832 vicinity of Anastasiewskaja
71	24 April 1943	16:45	P-39	PQ 34 Ost 85341, 9 km (5.6 mi) northwest of Gelendzhik vicinity of Tscheshskij	95	3 June 1943	16:46	Yak-1	PQ 34 Ost 76865, 7 km (4.3 mi) southeast of Anastasiewskaja north of Kecskemét
72	27 April 1943	17:18	Yak-1	PQ 34 Ost 86783 east of Bondarenka	96	5 June 1943	17:55	P-39	PQ 34 Ost 86771 vicinity of Bondarenka
73	28 April 1943	09:25	Yak-1	PQ 34 Ost 85161 vicinity of Nowenjkij	97	5 June 1943	17:55	P-39	PQ 34 Ost 86771 vicinity of Bondarenka
74	6 May 1943	04:04	Yak-1	PQ 35 Ost 71622; 25 km (16 mi) northeast of Volchansk	98	5 June 1943	17:58? (Note: According to Mathews and Foreman claimed at 17:53.)	Yak-1	PQ 34 Ost 75234, 1 km (0.62 mi) west of Moldawanskoje vicinity of Krymsk
75	6 May 1943	04:05	Yak-1	PQ 35 Ost 71541; 15 km (9.3 mi) northeast of Volchansk	99	7 June 1943	07:56	Boston	PQ 44 Ost 05651
76	6 May 1943	04:10	Yak-1	PQ 35 Ost 71522; 25 km (16 mi) northeast of Volchansk	100	8 June 1943	17:25	Spitfire	PQ 34 Ost 76821 vicinity of Kalabatka
77	7 May 1943	18:23	La-5	PQ 35 Ost 70183 vicinity of Shipovatoje	101	10 June 1943	18:30	Yak-1	PQ 34 Ost 85112, Krymskaja north of Mertschanskaja
78	7 May 1943	18:25	LaGG-3? (Note: Mathews and Foreman claimed over a Lavochkin La-5.)	PQ 35 Ost 70184, vicinity of Chuhuiv vicinity of Shipovatoje					

=== Awards ===
- Iron Cross (1939) 2nd and 1st Class
- Honor Goblet of the Luftwaffe on 19 October 1942 as Leutnant and pilot (Note: According to Obermaier on 6 July 1942.)
- Knight's Cross of the Iron Cross on 29 October 1942 as Staffelführer and Leutnant of the 3./Jagdgeschwader 52
- German Cross in Gold on 19 January 1944 (posthumously) as Hauptmann in the 3./Jagdgeschwader 52
