= Wolfgang Ewald =

German Luftwaffe ace (1911–1995)

- Born: 26 March 1911; Hamburg
- Died: 24 February 1995 (aged 83); Leonberg
- Military career
- Allegiance: Nazi Germany (to 1945); West Germany
- Branch: Army (?–1935); Luftwaffe (1935–45); German Air Force
- Service years: 1935–45; 1956–?
- Rank: Major (Wehrmacht); Oberstleutnant (Bundeswehr)
- Units: Condor Legion; JG 3, JG 52
- Commands: I./JG 52; III./JG 3
- Conflicts: Spanish Civil War; World War II: Invasion of Poland; Battle of the Netherlands; Battle of Belgium; Battle of France; Battle of Britain; Battle of the Caucasus; Battle of Kursk
- Awards: Spanish Cross with Swords; Knight's Cross of the Iron Cross

Wolfgang Ewald (26 March 1911 – 24 February 1995) was a Luftwaffe ace and recipient of the Knight's Cross of the Iron Cross during World War II. The Knight's Cross of the Iron Cross, and its variants were the highest awards in the military and paramilitary forces of Nazi Germany during World War II.

== Early life and career ==
Ewald was born on 26 March 1911 in Hamburg, at the time a sovereign state of the German Empire. In 1938, Ewald volunteered for service with the Condor Legion during the Spanish Civil War. Flying with 2. Staffel (2nd squadron) of Jagdgruppe 88 (J/88—88th Fighter Group), Ewald claimed a Polikarpov I-16 fighter shot down on 13 June. He was later awarded the Spanish Cross with Swords (Spanienkreuz mit Schwertern) on 14 April 1939 for his service in the Spanish Civil War.

On 1 November 1938, I. Gruppe (1st group) of Jagdgeschwader 433 (JG 433—433rd Fighter Wing) was formed at the Ingolstadt-Manching Airfield, 60 kilometers (37 miles) north of Munich. Initially the Gruppe was placed under the command of Hauptmann Dietrich Graf von Pfeil und Klein-Ellguth and equipped with the Messerschmitt Bf 109 D-1 fighter aircraft. That day, Ewald was appointed Staffelkapitän (squadron leader) of the Gruppe's 2. Staffel. On 1 May 1939, the Gruppe was renamed and became I. Gruppe of Jagdgeschwader 52 (JG 52—52nd Fighter Wing).

== World War II ==
I./JG 52 insignia

On 18 August 1940, known as The Hardest Day, twelve Bf 109s from 2. Staffel of JG 52, led by Ewald, attacked RAF fighters out in the open at RAF Manston. After two passes, the Germans claimed ten fighters and three Bristol Blenheim bombers destroyed. In fact, just two No. 266 Squadron Supermarine Spitfire fighters were destroyed with another six Hawker Hurricane fighters damaged but repairable. A single Hurricane was also destroyed. On 26 August, Ewald was appointed Gruppenkommandeur (group commander) of I. Gruppe of JG 52. He succeeded Hauptmann Siegfried von Eschwege who was transferred. On 24 May 1941, Ewald was posted to the staff of Jagdfliegerführer 2. Command of I. Gruppe of JG 52 was passed on to Oberleutnant Karl-Heinz Leesmann.

In late June 1942, Ewald was transferred to the Gruppenstab (headquarters unit) of III. Gruppe of Jagdgeschwader 3 "Udet" (JG 3—3rd Fighter Wing). At the time, III. Gruppe was based at Shchigry, located approximately 50 kilometers (31 miles) east-northeast of Kursk. On 28 June, German forces had launched Case Blue, the strategic summer offensive in southern Russia. That day, Ewald claimed two aerial victories with the Gruppenstab, a Lavochkin-Gorbunov-Gudkov LaGG-3 fighter and a Petlyakov Pe-2 bomber.

On 23 July 1942, Ewald was given command as Gruppenkommandeur of III. Gruppe of JG 3. He replaced Major Karl-Heinz Greisert who was killed in action the day before. Ewald was awarded the Knight's Cross of the Iron Cross (Ritterkreuz des Eisernen Kreuzes) on 9 December 1942.

On 14 July 1943 during the Battle of Kursk, Ewald was shot down in his Bf 109 G-6 (Werknummer 20220—factory number) by Soviet flak 20 kilometers (12 miles) northeast of Belgorod. He was temporarily replaced by Hauptmann Leo Eggers and Hauptmann Karl-Heinz Langer before command of III. Gruppe was officially given to Hauptmann Walther Dahl on 20 July. Ewald was taken prisoner of war and was held until 1949.

== Later life and death ==
Following World War II, Ewald joined the post-war German Air Force, at the time referred to as the Bundesluftwaffe, attaining the rank of Oberstleutnant (lieutenant colonel). He died on 24 February 1995 at the age of 83 in Sindelfingen, Germany.

== Summary of career ==
=== Aerial victory claims ===
According to US historian David T. Zabecki, Ewald was credited with 78 aerial victories. Spick also lists him with 78 aerial victories claimed in an unknown number combat missions. This figure includes one aerial victory during the Spanish Civil War, two during the Battle of France and Britain and further 75 aerial victories on the Eastern Front. Mathews and Foreman, authors of Luftwaffe Aces — Biographies and Victory Claims, researched the German Federal Archives and found documentation for 65 aerial victory claims, plus two further unconfirmed claims. This number includes one claim during the Spanish Civil War, one over the Western Allies, and 63 on the Eastern Front.

Victory claims were logged to a map-reference (PQ = Planquadrat), for example "PQ 4932". The Luftwaffe grid map (Jägermeldenetz) covered all of Europe, western Russia and North Africa and was composed of rectangles measuring 15 minutes of latitude by 30 minutes of longitude, an area of about 360 square miles (930 km^{2}). These sectors were then subdivided into 36 smaller units to give a location area 3 km × 4 km (1.9 mi × 2.5 mi) in size.

Chronicle of aerial victories
This and the – (dash) indicates unconfirmed aerial victory claims for which Ewald did not receive credit. This and the ? (question mark) indicates information discrepancies listed by Prien, Stemmer, Rodeike, Bock, Mathews and Foreman.
Claim	Date	Time	Type	Location	Claim	Date	Time	Type	Location
Spanish Civil War
– 2. Staffel of Jagdgruppe 88 – Spanish Civil War — June 1938
1	13 June 1938	—	I-16						
World War II
– Stab I. Gruppe of Jagdgeschwader 52 – Action at the Channel and over England — 26 August – 30 October 1940
—	2 September 1940	18:25	Spitfire		1	27 September 1940	13:30	Hurricane	
– Stab of Jagdgeschwader 3 "Udet" – Eastern Front — 19 May – June 1942
2	20 May 1942	03:49	R-Z? (Note: According to Mathews and Foreman claimed as a Polikarpov R-5.)		7	12 June 1942	10:42	Pe-2	east of Artemivka; 25 km (16 mi) south-southeast of Bely Kolodez
3	20 May 1942	03:51	R-Z?		8? (Note: This claim is not listed by Mathews and Foreman.)	13 June 1942	—	LaGG-3	
4?	28 May 1942	—	MiG-1		9	22 June 1942	04:00	LaGG-3	
5?	12 June 1942	10:30	Pe-2	northeast of Dwuretschnaja	10	22 June 1942	10:15	Pe-2	
6	12 June 1942	10:35	MiG-1	15 km (9.3 mi) northeast of Dwuretschnaja; 25 km (16 mi) north-northeast of Kupiansk	11	24 June 1942	15:20	Pe-2	
– Stab III. Gruppe of Jagdgeschwader 3 "Udet" – Eastern Front — June 1942 – 3 February 1943
12	28 June 1942	12:05	LaGG-3		35	14 September 1942	09:45	Yak-1	Stalingrad
13	28 June 1942	19:09	Pe-2		36	18 September 1942	17:00	Il-2	east of Stalingrad
14	1 July 1942	17:26	LaGG-3	15 km (9.3 mi) east of Stary Oskol	37	18 September 1942	17:07	Yak-1	northeast of Kotluban train station
15	9 July 1942	19:27	Il-2	Voronezh	38	1 October 1942	06:25	Il-2	northeast of Kotluban train station
16	17 July 1942	19:03	MiG-3		39	1 October 1942	06:30	Il-2	south of Iwanowka train station
17	24 July 1942	11:25	MiG-1		40	17 October 1942	09:12	Yak-1	northeast of Stalingrad
18	31 July 1942	11:40	Yak-1	north of Peselasowski	41	25 October 1942	10:12	Il-2	Stalingrad
19	6 August 1942	10:55	Pe-2	north of Aksay	42	25 October 1942	14:32	Il-2	Stalingrad
20	6 August 1942	10:58	Pe-2	north of Aksay	43	25 October 1942	14:36	Il-2	Beketovka
21	13 August 1942	17:43	MiG-3	east of Kalach	44	26 October 1942	11:15	Il-2	southeast of Stalingrad
22	19 August 1942	10:50	LaGG-3	PQ 40821	45	26 October 1942	14:00	Il-2	west of Sarepta
23	23 August 1942	05:40	LaGG-3	north of Popiwskaja	46	26 October 1942	14:04	Il-2	west of Sarepta
24	23 August 1942	05:55	LaGG-3	southwest of Leninsk	47	26 October 1942	14:07	Il-2	southwest of Sarepta
25	24 August 1942	17:30	Hurricane	north of Leninsk	48	2 November 1942	10:14	Yak-1	Akhtuba
26	25 August 1942	11:05	LaGG-3	Stalingrad	49	2 November 1942	12:54	MiG-1	Akhtuba
27	30 August 1942	09:25? (Note: According to Mathews and Foreman claimed at 08:42.)	Hurricane	north-northwest of Stalingrad	50	10 November 1942	13:50? (Note: According to Mathews and Foreman claimed at 08:42.)	MiG-3	south of Dubovka
28	31 August 1942	17:15	Pe-2	north of Sarepta	51	1 December 1942	09:02	MiG-3	15 km (9.3 mi) north of Tshir railroad station
29	31 August 1942	17:23	LaGG-3	northeast of Leninsk	52	2 December 1942	10:02	Il-2	PQ 4932 south of Borodajewka
30	1 September 1942	10:48	Il-2	west of Stalingrad	53	2 December 1942	10:15	Il-2	PQ 4912
31	4 September 1942	15:40	Yak-1	southwest of Stalingrad	54	8 December 1942	09:55	P-40	PQ 3961
32	7 September 1942	15:52	Il-2	north of Kotluban train station	55	8 December 1942	10:00	P-40	PQ 3942
33	9 September 1942	10:38	Il-2	Prudki	56	8 December 1942	10:12	P-40	PQ 2943
34	10 September 1942	11:20	Pe-2	south of Kalach	57	8 December 1942	13:07	Boston	PQ 3915
– Stab III. Gruppe of Jagdgeschwader 3 "Udet" – Eastern Front — 4 February – 14 July 1943
58	16 March 1943	14:15	LaGG-3	PQ 35 Ost 7041, west of Kamenka					
According to Prien, Stemmer, Rodeike and Bock, Ewald claimed aerial victories 59 to 63 while commanding a German/Romanian fighter group in April 1943. These five claims are not listed by Mathews and Foreman.
64	2 May 1943	15:10	MiG-3		69	8 July 1943	10:12	Il-2	PQ 35 Ost 62763, west of Dmitriyevskoye; 20 km (12 mi) southeast of Oboyan
65	5 July 1943	03:50	LaGG-3	PQ 35 Ost 61119, west of Werchopenje	70	8 July 1943	18:42	MiG-3	PQ 35 Ost 6279, northeast of Tomarovka
66	5 July 1943	07:28	Il-2	PQ 35 Ost 61681, west of Volchansk	71	9 July 1943	09:27	LaGG-3	PQ 35 Ost 62824, Rshawa train station 30 km (19 mi) east of Oboyan
— (Note: This unconfirmed claim is not listed by Mathews and Foreman.)	5 July 1943	—	Il-2		72	11 July 1943	13:32	La-5	PQ 35 Ost 6287, Bogorodizoje
67	7 July 1943	03:50	Il-2	PQ 35 Ost 6167, southeast of Belgorod	—	14 July 1943	—	Il-2	
68	7 July 1943	10:42	MiG-3	PQ 35 Ost 6278, Bogorodizoje					

=== Awards ===
- Spanish Cross in Gold with Swords (14 April 1939)
- Iron Cross (1939) 2nd and 1st Class
- Honour Goblet of the Luftwaffe on 21 September 1942 as Hauptmann and Gruppenkommandeur
- German Cross in Gold on 3 October 1942 as Hauptmann in the III./Jagdgeschwader 3
- Knight's Cross of the Iron Cross on 9 December 1942 as Major and Gruppenkommandeur of the III./Jagdgeschwader 3 "Udet"

== Notes ==
Military offices
Preceded by Hauptmann Siegfried von Eschwege	Commander of I. Gruppe of Jagdgeschwader 52; 27 August 1940 – 24 May 1941	Succeeded by Hauptmann Karl-Heinz Leesmann
Preceded by Major Karl-Heinz Greisert	Commander of III. Gruppe of Jagdgeschwader 3; 23 July 1942 – 20 July 1943	Succeeded by Major Walther Dahl
