= Robert Olejnik (pilot) =

German World War II flying ace (1911–1988)

- Olejenik as an Oberleutnant
- Born: 9 March 1911; Essen-Borbeck
- Died: 29 October 1988 (aged 77); Munich
- Military career
- Allegiance: Nazi Germany
- Branch: Luftwaffe
- Service years: 1935–1945
- Rank: Major (major)
- Units: JG 3, JG 1, Ekdo 16, JGr Süd, JG 400, EJG 2
- Commands: 1./JG 3, 4./JG 1, II./JG 1, III./JG 1,
- Conflicts: World War II
- Awards: Knight's Cross of the Iron Cross

Robert Olejnik (9 March 1911 – 29 October 1988) was a Luftwaffe flying ace of World War II. He was credited with 41 aerial victories claimed in some 680 combat missions. He was also a recipient of the Knight's Cross of the Iron Cross. The Knight's Cross of the Iron Cross, and its variants were the highest awards in the military and paramilitary forces of Nazi Germany during World War II.

== Early life and career ==
Olejnik was born on 9 March 1911 in Borbeck, present-day a borough of Essen, then in the Rhine Province of the German Empire. In October 1933, he began his pilot training at the Deutsche Verkehrsfliegerschule (DVS—German Air Transport School) at Schleißheim. In March 1935, Olejnik transferred to the newly formed Luftwaffe.

== World War II ==
World War II in Europe began on Friday 1 September 1939 when German forces invaded Poland. On 15 June 1940 during the Battle of France, Olejnik was posted to the 2. Staffel (2nd squadron) of Jagdgeschwader 3 (JG 3—3rd Fighter Wing). The Staffel was subordinated to I. Gruppe (1st group) of JG 3 commanded by Hauptmann Günther Lützow.

On 26 August 1940 during the Battle of Britain, Olejnik was credited with his first aerial victory, a Royal Air Force (RAF) Hawker Hurricane fighter claimed shot down near Faversham. That day, JG 3 flew a fighter escort mission for bombers from Kampfgeschwader 3 (KG 3—3rd Bomber Wing) attacking Canterbury. In late August, command of I. Gruppe changed when Lützow was appointed Geschwaderkommodore (wing commander) of JG 3. At first, command of the Gruppe temporarily was given to Oberleutnant Lothar Keller until command officially transferred to Hauptmann Hans von Hahn on 27 August. which On 5 September, I. Gruppe escorted 22 Dornier Do 17 bombers attacking southern London. After the bombers dropped their bombs, the formation came under attack by approximately 15 to 20 Supermarine Spitfire fighters. In this encounter, Olejnik claimed two Spitfires shot down over the Thames Estuary. For these aerial victories, Olejnik was awarded both classes of the Iron Cross (Eisernes Kreuz).

The Gruppe escorted Messerschmitt Bf 110 fighter bombers to London on 5 October. On this mission, Oljenik claimed a Spitfire fighter shot down near Canterbury. On 5 February 1941, the RAF flew "Circus" No. 3 targeting the airfield at Saint-Omer. That day, Olejnik claimed his fifth aerial victory over a Spitfire fighter shot down northwest of Saint-Omer. On 14 February, I. Gruppe began relocating back to Germany for a period of rest and replenishment, completing the transfer to Mannheim-Sandhofen Airfield by 18 February. The pilots were then sent on a skiing vacation to Seefeld in Tirol and returned to active duty by 31 March. The Gruppe was then equipped with the Messerschmitt Bf 109 F variant. On 18 April, I. Gruppe began relocating back to English Channel, then based at Saint-Pol-sur-Ternoise, completing the transfer by 6 May.

On 16 May 1941, Olejnik was transferred and appointed Staffelkapitän (squadron leader) of 1. Staffel of JG 3. He succeeded Oberleutnant Gerhard Sprenger who had been killed in action. The Gruppe flew its last mission on the English Channel on 5 June. On 9 June, I. Gruppe was ordered east, flying to Breslau via stopovers in Saint-Dizier, Böblingen and Straubing.

=== War against the Soviet Union ===
In preparation for Operation Barbarossa, the German invasion of the Soviet Union, I. Gruppe was assigned to an airfield at Dub on 11 June 1941. At the start of the campaign, JG 3 was subordinated to the V. Fliegerkorps (5th Air Corps), under command of General der Flieger Robert Ritter von Greim, which was part of Luftflotte 4 (4th Air Fleet), under command of Generaloberst Alexander Löhr. These air elements supported Generalfeldmarschall Gerd von Rundstedt's Heeresgruppe Süd (Army Group South), with the objective of capturing Ukraine and its capital Kiev. In early morning hours of 22 June, the first day of the invasion, Olejnik claimed Polikarpov I-16 fighter shot down on an escort mission for Junkers Ju 88 bombers from Kampfgeschwader 51 (KG 51—51st Bomber Wing) attacking the airfield at Kurovitsa. According to Bergström and Mikhailov, this claim by Olejnik may have been the first German claim on the Eastern Front.

On 8 July, Olejnik was credited with his 25th aerial victory when he claimed three Ilyushin DB-3 bombers shot down. Olejnik was awarded the Knight's Cross of the Iron Cross (Ritterkreuz des Eisernen Kreuzes) on 27 July for 32 aerial victories. On 14 August during the Battle of Kiev, Olejnik's Bf 109 F was hit in the radiator in aerial combat with I-16 fighters, resulting in a forced landing at Vasilkov. His victor may have been Leytenant Vasiliy Demyenok from 88 IAP (Istrebitelny Aviatsionny Polk—Истребительный Авиационный Полк or Fighter Aviation Regiment). In mid-September, with the exception of twelve pilots and some ground personnel, the Gruppe was withdrawn from the Eastern Front, arriving in Magdeburg by train on 3 October. At the time, Olejnik was the highest claiming fighter pilot of I. Gruppe.

=== Western Front ===
In September 1941, with the exception of 3. Staffel which followed in November, I. Gruppe of JG 3 was transferred from the Eastern Front to Germany for rest and re-supply. In November 1941, it was transferred to the northern Netherlands and on 15 January 1942 re-designated II. Gruppe of Jagdgeschwader 1 (JG 1—1st Fighter Wing) in Katwijk. In consequence, 1. Staffel of JG 3 became the 4. Staffel of JG 1, 2. Staffel of JG 3 became the 5. Staffel of JG 1, and 3. Staffel of JG 3 became the 6. Staffel of JG 1. In consequence, Olejnik then commanded 4. Staffel of JG 1. On 9 May 1943, Olejnik was scrambled at 19:46 to intercept a De Havilland Mosquito bomber which he shot down north of Amsterdam.

When on 16 May, Hauptmann Dietrich Wickop, the commanding officer of II. Gruppe, was killed in action, Olejnik was briefly tasked with the leadership of the Gruppe. In consequence, Olejnik was replaced by Leutnant Heinz Tröger as head of 4. Staffel. Tröger was killed on 17 June and was succeeded by Leutnant Richard Haug who was killed in a flight accident one week later. Olejnik then resumed command of the Staffel, handing command of the Gruppe to Hauptmann Walter Hoeckner. On 26 July, Olejnik was appointed Gruppenkommandeur (group commander) of III. Gruppe of JG 1. He succeed Major Karl-Heinz Leesmann who had been killed in action the day before. Command of 4. Staffel was passed on to Oberleutnant Eugen Kotiza. On 17 August during the Schweinfurt-Regensburg mission, Olejnik claimed a United States Army Air Forces Boeing B-17 Flying Fortress bomber shot down.

=== Flying the Messerschmitt Me 163 ===
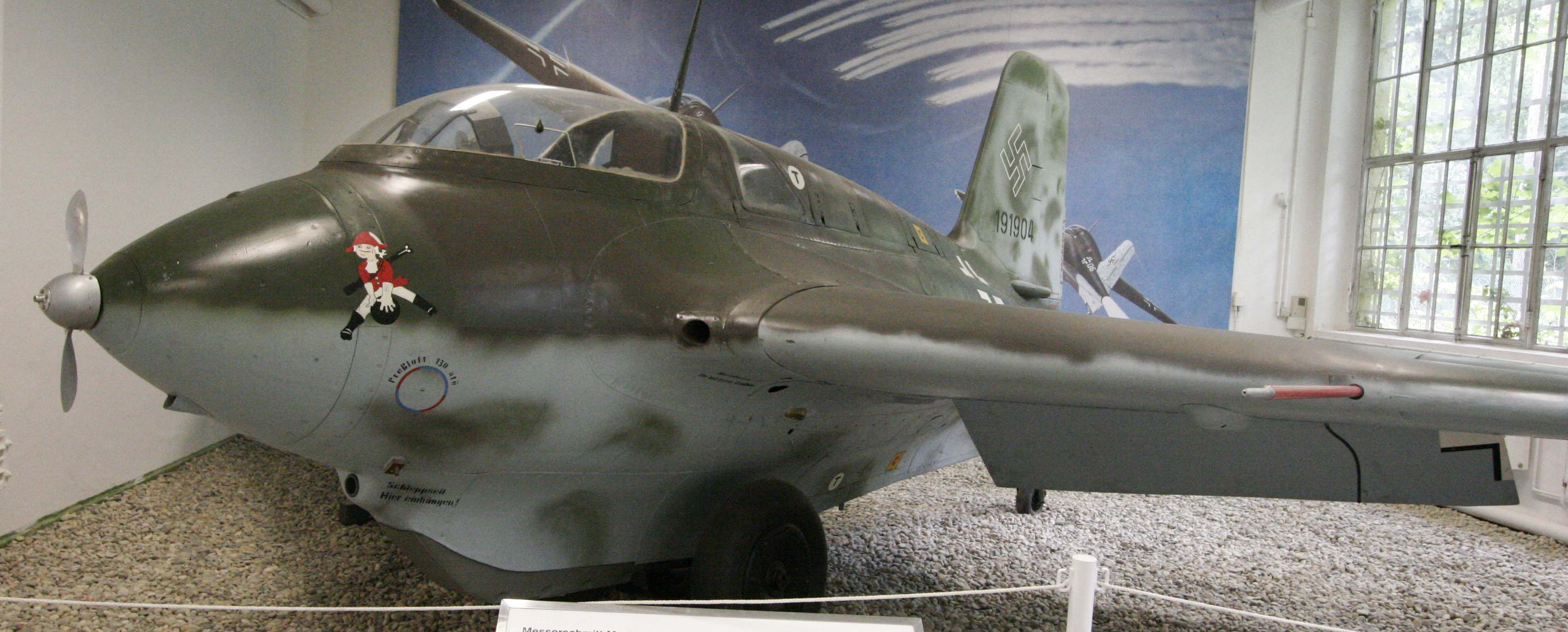
Messerschmitt Me 163 at the Luftwaffenmuseum in Berlin-Gatow

In October 1943, Olejnik was transferred to Erprobungskommando 16, a test unit for the new Messerschmitt Me 163 rocket fighter, then based at the Luftwaffe airfield in Bad Zwischenahn. In early 1944, the Luftwaffe ordered the formation of 20. Staffel of JG 1, which was to be equipped with the Me 163. On 27 March, this Staffel was redesignated and became the 1. Staffel of Jagdgeschwader 400 (JG 400—400th Fighter Wing) based at Wittmundhafen Airfield with Olejnik appointed its first commander. On 21 April, Olejnik was wounded in an emergency landing when his Me 163 B-0/V16 (Werknummer 110025—factory number) exploded at Wittmundhafen Airfield. In consequence, command of 1. Staffel was given to Hauptmann Otto Böhner. Following his convalescence in September, Olejnik was given command of I. Gruppe of JG 400 then based at Brandis. He served in this capacity until 2 November when he was transferred to command IV. Gruppe of Ergänzungs-Jagdgeschwader 2, a supplementary training unit. Consequently, command of I. Gruppe of JG 400 was briefly given to Oberleutnant Rudolf Opitz before Hauptmann Wilhelm Fulda took command on 25 November.

== Later life ==
Olejnik died on 29 October 1988 at the age of 77 in Munich, West Germany.

== Summary of career ==
=== Aerial victory claims ===
According to Obermaier, Olejnik was credited with 42 aerial victories victories claimed in 680 combat missions. This figure includes 32 claims on the Eastern Front and 10 over the Western Allies, including three four-engine heavy bombers and a Mosquito. Mathews and Foreman, authors of Luftwaffe Aces — Biographies and Victory Claims, researched the German Federal Archives and state that he was credited with over 40 aerial victory claims. This figure of confirmed claims includes 32 aerial victories on the Eastern Front and eight, potentially more claims, on the Western Front, including two four-engine bombers.

Chronicle of aerial victories
This and the ♠ (Ace of spades) indicates those aerial victories which made Olejnik an "ace-in-a-day", a term which designates a fighter pilot who has shot down five or more airplanes in a single day. This and the – (dash) indicates unconfirmed aerial victory claims for which Olejnik did not receive credit.
Claim	Date	Time	Type	Location	Claim	Date	Time	Type	Location
– 2. Staffel of Jagdgeschwader 3 – Battle of Britain and on the English Channel — 26 June 1940 – 9 June 1941
1	26 August 1940	—	Hurricane	Faversham	4	5 October 1940	—	Spitfire	Canterbury
2	5 September 1940	—	Spitfire	Thames Estuary	5	5 February 1941	—	Spitfire	northwest of Saint-Omer
3	5 September 1940	—	Spitfire	Thames Estuary					
– 3. Staffel of Jagdgeschwader 3 – Operation Barbarossa — 22 June – 16 September 1941
6	22 June 1941	03:40	I-16		22	7 July 1941	—	SB-2	
7	23 June 1941	—	SB-2		23	8 July 1941	—	DB-3	
8	23 June 1941	—	SB-2		24	8 July 1941	—	DB-3	
9	23 June 1941	—	SB-2		25	8 July 1941	—	DB-3	
10	23 June 1941	—	SB-2		26	9 July 1941	—	DB-3	
11♠	26 June 1941	—	DB-3		27	10 July 1941	—	SB-2	
12♠	26 June 1941	—	DB-3		28	11 July 1941	—	I-16	
13♠	26 June 1941	—	DB-3		29	11 July 1941	—	I-16	
14♠	26 June 1941	—	DB-3		30	13 July 1941	—	I-16	
15♠	26 June 1941	—	DB-3		31	16 July 1941	—	SB-3	
16	27 June 1941	—	DB-3		32	16 July 1941	—	SB-3	
17	27 June 1941	—	DB-3		33	1 August 1941	11:25	DB-3	40 km (25 mi) southeast of Malyn
18	2 July 1941	—	V-11		34	9 August 1941	08:45	DB-3	
19	2 July 1941	—	U-2		35	11 August 1941	—	SB-3	
20	3 July 1941	—	I-16		36	25 August 1941	07:55	R-10	north of Ostijew
21	6 July 1941	15:38	DB-3	Shepetivka					
– 4. Staffel of Jagdgeschwader 1 – Defense of the Reich — 1 January – May 1943
37	9 May 1943	20:37	Mosquito	15 km (9.3 mi) southeast of Den Helder					
– Stab II. Gruppe of Jagdgeschwader 1 – Defense of the Reich — May – 28 June 1943
38	31 May 1943	—	Spitfire	60 km (37 mi) east of Margate					
– Stab III. Gruppe of Jagdgeschwader 1 – Defense of the Reich — 26 July – 8 October 1943
—	26 July 1943	—	B-17	north of Heligoland	40	8 October 1943	15:23	B-17	PQ 05 Ost S/QR
39	17 August 1943	15:45	B-17	PQ 05 Ost S/DT					

=== Awards ===
- Iron Cross (1939)
  - 2nd Class (17 September 1940) (Note: According to Ransom and Cammann on 9 September 1940.)
  - 1st Class (21 September 1940) (Note: According to Ransom and Cammann on 30 September 1940.)
- Honor Goblet of the Luftwaffe (18 July 1941)
- Front Flying Clasp of the Luftwaffe for fighter pilots in Gold (5 May 1941)
- Knight's Cross of the Iron Cross on 27 July 1941 as Oberleutnant and Staffelkapitän of the 4./Jagdgeschwader 1 (Note: According to Scherzer on 30 July 1941 as pilot in the I./Jagdgeschwader 3.)
