= Karl-Heinz Leesmann =

German fighter ace and Knight's Cross recipient (1915–1943)

- Born: 3 May 1915; Osnabrück
- Died: 25 July 1943 (aged 28); North Sea, off Heligoland
- Military career
- Allegiance: Nazi Germany
- Branch: Luftwaffe
- Service years: 1936–1943
- Rank: Major (major)
- Units: JG 52, JG 1
- Commands: I./JG 52; III./JG 1
- Conflicts: World War II: Battle of France; Battle of Britain; Operation Barbarossa; Defense of the Reich
- Awards: Knight's Cross of the Iron Cross

Karl-Heinz Leesmann (3 May 1915 – 25 July 1943) was a Luftwaffe ace and recipient of the Knight's Cross of the Iron Cross during World War II. He was the first member of Jagdgeschwader 52 to receive this distinction. Leesmann was shot down on 25 July 1943, by a Boeing B-17 Flying Fortress bomber that he was attacking. During his career he was credited with 37 aerial victories, 27 on the Western Front and 10 on the Eastern Front.

== Early life and career ==
Leesmann was born on 3 May 1915 in Osnabrück in the Province of Hanover within the German Empire. He joined the military service of the Luftwaffe and following completion of his flight and fighter pilot training, (Note: Flight training in the Luftwaffe progressed through the levels A1, A2 and B1, B2, referred to as A/B flight training. A training included theoretical and practical training in aerobatics, navigation, long-distance flights and dead-stick landings. The B courses included high-altitude flights, instrument flights, night landings and training to handle the aircraft in difficult situations.) Leesmann was posted to Luftwaffe staff position holding the rank of Leutnant (second lieutenant).

On 18 February 1939, Oberleutnant Alfons Klein, the commander of 3. Staffel (3rd squadron) of Jagdgeschwader 433 (JG 433—433rd Fighter Wing), was killed in a flight accident. The Junkers Ju 52 on which he was travelling as a passenger crashed in heavy snowfall. In consequence, Leesmann was briefly appointed Staffelkapitän (Squadron Leader) of 3. Staffel. He led the Staffel until 1 March when Oberleutnant Helmut Kühle was officially appointed its new commander. On 20 March, I. Gruppe (1st group) of JG 433 was redesignated and became I. Gruppe of Jagdgeschwader 52 (JG 52—52nd Fighter Wing). That day, I. Gruppe moved to Böblingen.

== World War II ==
World War II in Europe began on Friday, 1 September 1939 when German forces invaded Poland. That day, I. Gruppe moved to Bonn-Hangelar Airfield, protecting the German border during the "Phoney War". In preparation for Operation Sea Lion (Unternehmen Seelöwe), the proposed amphibious invasion of Great Britain, I. Gruppe of JG 52 moved to an airfield at Coquelles near the English Channel on 3 August 1940. Here on 24 August, Leesmann claimed his first aerial victory, a Royal Air Force (RAF) Supermarine Spitfire shot down east of Margate.

I./JG 52 insignia

On 27 August, Leesmann was appointed Staffelkapitän of 3. Staffel of JG 52. He replaced Hauptmann Wolfgang Ewald who was appointed commander of I. Gruppe of JG 52. On 15 September, also known as Battle of Britain Day, Leesmann claimed two Hawker Hurricane fighters over the Thames Estuary on fighter escort mission for Junkers Ju 88 bombers heading for London, taking his total to ten aerial victories. Leesmann was awarded the Honor Goblet of the Luftwaffe (Ehrenpokal der Luftwaffe) on 5 October.

On 24 May 1941, Leesmann was appointed Gruppenkommandeur (group commander) of I. Gruppe of JG 52. He succeeded Ewald who was transferred. Five days later, the Geschwaderstab (headquarters unit) of I. Gruppe relocated to Leeuwarden Airfield. Here on 30 June, Leesmann claimed two Bristol Blenheim bombers shot down northwest of Texel, taking his total to 22. Following his 22nd aerial victory claimed, Leesmann was awarded the Knight's Cross of the Iron Cross (Ritterkreuz des Eisernen Kreuzes) on 23 July 1941. He was the first member of JG 52 to receive this distinction.

=== War against the Soviet Union ===
On 22 June, German forces had launched Operation Barbarossa, the invasion of the Soviet Union. On 21 September 1941, I. Gruppe of JG 52 was ordered to relocate to the Eastern Front. With stopovers at Dortmund, Magdeburg, and Warsaw, the Gruppe arrived in Orsha on 29 September. In support for Operation Typhoon, also known as the Battle of Moscow, the Gruppe moved to an airfield named Ponyatovka, located approximately 30 kilometers (19 miles) southwest of Roslavl, on 2 October. There, the Gruppe was initially subordinated to the Stab of Jagdgeschwader 27 (JG 27—27th Fighter Wing) and supported German forces fighting in the Battle of Vyazma as part of Operation Typhoon, the code name of the German offensive on Moscow.

On 20 October, the Gruppe moved to an airfield named Kalinin-Southwest, present-day Tver, and located on the Volga, and to Staritsa on 31 October and then to Ruza located approximately 80 kilometers (50 miles) west of Moscow, on 3 November. Here on 22 October, Leesmann claimed his 25th aerial victory when he shot down an Ilyushin DB-3 bomber. On 6 November, Leesmann was severely wounded in combat and was grounded for many months. His Messerschmitt Bf 109 F-2 (Werknummer 9181—factory number) was hit by enemy fire resulting in an emergency landing at Ruza. In consequence, command of I. Gruppe was passed to Oberleutnant Carl Lommel. Leesmann returned to active service following a lengthy period of convalescence on 6 May 1942. At the time, I. Gruppe was based at Olmütz, present-day Olomouc in the Czech Republic, where they received new Bf 109 F-4 aircraft. The Gruppe then redeployed to the Eastern Front. On 13 June, Leesmann had to again transfer command of I. Gruppe, this time to Hauptmann Helmut Bennemann. The injuries he had sustained on 6 November 1941 had prevented him from further operational flying. On 27 July, Leesmann was awarded the German Cross in Gold (Deutsches Kreuz in Gold).

=== In defense of the Reich and death ===
In consequence of the newly created Jagdgeschwader 11 (JG 11—11th Fighter Wing) on 31 March 1943, a new III. Gruppe of Jagdgeschwader 1 (JG 1—1st Fighter Wing) was formed and placed under command of Leesmann.

On 25 July during Blitz Week, a period of United States Army Air Forces (USAAF) aerial bombardment during the 1943 Combined Bomber Offensive, the USAAF VIII Bomber Command targeted Hamburg and Warnemünde. III. Gruppe was scrambled at 16:15 and vectored to a point of intercept over the Elbe estuary where they encountered a formation of approximately 100 Boeing B-17 Flying Fortress bombers. Leading his formation, Leesmann approached the bombers in a head-on attack. Following the attack, he radioed that his Bf 109 G-6 (Werknummer 20073) had taken hits. Leesmann was killed in action when his Bf 109 crashed into the North Sea in an area southeast of Heligoland. Command of III. Gruppe was then passed to Hauptmann Robert Olejnik.

== Summary of career ==
=== Aerial victory claims ===
Mathews and Foreman, authors of Luftwaffe Aces — Biographies and Victory Claims, researched the German Federal Archives and found records for 34 aerial victory claims, plus two further unconfirmed claims. This figure includes 10 aerial victories on the Eastern Front and 24 over the Western Allies, including one four-engined heavy bomber.

Victory claims were logged to a map-reference (PQ = Planquadrat), for example "PQ 05 Ost 148". The Luftwaffe grid map (Jägermeldenetz) covered all of Europe, western Russia and North Africa and was composed of rectangles measuring 15 minutes of latitude by 30 minutes of longitude, an area of about 360 square miles (930 km^{2}). These sectors were then subdivided into 36 smaller units to give a location area 3 km × 4 km (1.9 mi × 2.5 mi) in size.

Chronicle of aerial victories
This and the – (dash) indicates unconfirmed aerial victory claims for which Leesmann did not receive credit. This and the ? (question mark) indicates information discrepancies listed by Prien, Stemmer, Rodeike, Bock, Mathews and Foreman.
Claim	Date	Time	Type	Location	Claim	Date	Time	Type	Location
– 1. Staffel of Jagdgeschwader 52 – Battle of Britain and on the English Channel — 3–26 August 1940
1	24 August 1940	17:12	Spitfire	10 km (6.2 mi) east of Margate	2	26 August 1940	12:50	Spitfire	Dover; Thames Estuary
– 2. Staffel of Jagdgeschwader 52 – Battle of Britain and on the English Channel — 27 August – 30 October 1940
3	31 August 1940	13:50? (Note: According to Mathews and Foreman claimed at 14:50.)	Hurricane	southern edge of London	10	15 September 1940	15:40	Hurricane	Thames Estuary
4	31 August 1940	14:00	Spitfire	Benchley	11	18 September 1940	13:50? (Note: According to Mathews and Foreman claimed at 13:49.)	Hurricane	Tilbury
5	31 August 1940	19:30	Hurricane		12	24 September 1940	14:35	Spitfire	10 km (6.2 mi) off Dover
6	1 September 1940	11:50? (Note: According to Mathews and Foreman claimed at 11:47.)	Spitfire	Sittingbourne	13	24 September 1940	14:40	Spitfire	10 km (6.2 mi) off Dover
7	5 September 1940	11:05	Spitfire		— ? (Note: This unconfirmed claim is not listed by Prien, Stemmer, Rodeike and Bock.)	27 September 1940	14:55	Spitfire	
8	7 September 1940	18:10	Spitfire	Maidstone	14	11 October 1940	12:10	Hurricane	
9	15 September 1940	15:25	Hurricane	Thames Estuary					
– 2. Staffel of Jagdgeschwader 52 – On the Western Front — 27 December 1940 – 23 May 1941
15	15 February 1941	13:20	Hurricane	Ostend					
– Stab I. Gruppe of Jagdgeschwader 52 – On the Western Front — 24 May – 23 September 1941
16	25 May 1941	16:35	Blenheim	north of Nordeney	20	13 June 1941	06:17	Hudson	120 km (75 mi) west of Texel
17	28 May 1941	20:55? (Note: According to Mathews and Foreman claimed at 21:03.)	Blenheim	200 km (120 mi) north-northwest of Texel; 200 km (120 mi) north-northwest of Terschelling	21? (Note: According to Mathews and Foreman this claim is unconfirmed.)	30 June 1941	14:47	Blenheim	150 km (93 mi) northwest of Texel
18	28 May 1941	21:00	Blenheim	200 km (120 mi) north-northwest of Texel; 200 km (120 mi) north-northwest of Terschelling	22	30 June 1941	14:51	Blenheim	160 km (99 mi) northwest of Texel
19	12 June 1941	21:05? (Note: According to Mathews and Foreman claimed at 21:15 over a Lockheed Hudson.)	Blenheim?	PQ 05 Ost 148; North Sea					
– Stab I. Gruppe of Jagdgeschwader 52 – Operation Barbarossa — 2 October – 6 November 1941
23	17 October 1941	15:35	I-18 (MiG-1)		27	28 October 1941	15:05	Pe-2	
24	18 October 1941	11:50	SB-2 (Seversky)		28	29 October 1941	08:06	I-18 (MiG-1)	
25	22 October 1941	10:59	DB-3		29	5 November 1941	08:52	I-26 (Yak-1)	
26	28 October 1941	13:50? (Note: According to Mathews and Foreman claimed at 13:49.)	I-18 (MiG-1)		30	6 November 1941	11:25	I-16	
– Stab I. Gruppe of Jagdgeschwader 52 – On the Eastern Front — 19 May – 13 June 1942
31	26 May 1942	15:41	Il-2		32	4 June 1942	18:45	Il-2	
– Stab III. Gruppe of Jagdgeschwader 11 – On the Eastern Front — Defense of the Reich — 1 April – 26 July 1943
33? (Note: This claim is not listed by Mathews and Foreman.)	25 June 1943	—	B-17		35	18 July 1943	20:44	Beaufighter	10 km (6.2 mi) west of Den Helder
34	18 July 1943	20:44	Beaufighter	8 km (5.0 mi) west of Den Helder	36	25 July 1943	17:45	B-17	

=== Awards ===
- Iron Cross (1939) 2nd and 1st Class
- Honor Goblet of the Luftwaffe (5 October 1940)
- Knight's Cross of the Iron Cross on 23 July 1941 as Oberleutnant and Staffelkapitän of the 2./Jagdgeschwader 52
- German Cross in Gold on 27 July 1942 as Hauptmann in the I./Jagdgeschwader 52

== Notes ==
Military offices
Preceded by Hauptmann Wolfgang Ewald	Commander of I. Gruppe of Jagdgeschwader 52; 25 May 1941 – 6 November 1941	Succeeded by Oberleutnant Carl Lommel
Preceded by Major Walter Spies	Commander of II. Gruppe of Jagdgeschwader 1; 1 April 1943 – 25 July 1943	Succeeded by Hauptmann Robert Olejnik
