= Helmut Bennemann =

German fighter ace and Knight's Cross recipient (1915–2007)

- Helmut Bennemann
- Born: 16 March 1915; Wanne-Eickel
- Died: 17 November 2007 (aged 92); Bad Sassendorf
- Military career
- Allegiance: Nazi Germany
- Branch: Luftwaffe
- Rank: Oberstleutnant (lieutenant colonel)
- Units: JG 52, JG 53
- Commands: I./JG 52, JG 53
- Conflicts: World War II
- Awards: Knight's Cross of the Iron Cross
- Other work: dentist

Helmut Bennemann (16 March 1915 – 17 November 2007) was an Oberstleutnant of Nazi Germany's Luftwaffe in World War II. Bennemann claimed 93 aerial victories in over 400 combat missions. The majority of his victories were claimed over the Eastern Front. His commands included Geschwaderkommodore (wing commander) of the Jagdgeschwader 53. Following World War II, Bennemann became a dentist He died on 17 November 2007 at the age of 92 in Bad Sassendorf.

== Career ==
Bennemann was born on 16 March 1915 in Wanne-Eickel in the Ruhrgebiet of Province of Westphalia within the German Empire. He joined the military service of the Luftwaffe in 1936 and was trained as an aerial reconnaissance pilot. (Note: Flight training in the Luftwaffe progressed through the levels A1, A2 and B1, B2, referred to as A/B flight training. A training included theoretical and practical training in aerobatics, navigation, long-distance flights and dead-stick landings. The B courses included high-altitude flights, instrument flights, night landings and training to handle the aircraft in difficult situations.) When Germany invaded Poland on 1 September 1939 starting World War II, Bennemann flew reconnaissance missions.

In June 1940, Bennemann was posted to I. Gruppe (1st group) of Jagdgeschwader 52 (JG 52—52nd Fighter Wing) where he served as an adjutant. At the time, I. Gruppe was based at Zerbst and subordinated to Jagdgeschwader 77 (JG 77—77th Fighter Wing) and tasked with protecting Dessau and the Leuna works from aerial attacks. On 18 July, I. Gruppe was ordered to Neuruppin, augmenting the aerial defenses of Berlin during the session of the Reichstag following the Battle of France. The Gruppe then relocated to Bayreuth-Bindlach Airfield where it was tasked with protecting the Bayreuth Festival before returning to Zerbst on 24 July. Five days later, I. Gruppe moved to Bönninghardt located west of Wesel.

=== Battle of Britain ===
In preparation for Operation Sea Lion, the planned invasion of the United Kingdom, and the Battle of Britain, I. Gruppe was ordered to Coquelles located approximately 3 kilometers (1.9 miles) southwest of Calais. Here Bennemann claimed his first aerial victory on 26 August, when he shot down a Royal Air Force (RAF) Supermarine Spitfire fighter near Dover on a mission escorting bombers to RAF Lympne. On 31 August, Bennemann claimed his second aerial victory, a Hawker Hurricane fighter shot down near London on a mission escorting Messerschmitt Bf 110 heavy fighters from Erprobungsgruppe 210 (ErpGr. 210—210th Testing Group) attacking RAF Kenley. The following day, I. Gruppe escorted Heinkel He 111 bombers attacking the Port of Tilbury on the River Thames. On this mission, Bennemann claimed a Spitfire shot down near Sittingbourne.

On 2 September, I. Gruppe again escorted Bf 110 heavy fighters from ErpGr. 210, this time attacking RAF Eastchurch. That day, Bennemann claimed a Spitfire fighter shot down near Canterbury. Five days later, the Luftwaffe targeted the Beckton Gas Works in London. Escorting He 111 bombers to the target area, Bennemann claimed a Hurricane fighter shot down. On 15 September, Bennemann claimed three Hurricane fighters shot down over the Thames Estuary, recording aerial victories six to eight. That day, I. Gruppe had escorted Junkers Ju 88 bombers to London. On 24 September, I. Gruppe flew a combat air patrol over the English Channel, claiming seven aerial victories, two of which by Bennemann against two Spitfire fighters off of Dover. Bennemann was awarded the Honor Goblet of the Luftwaffe (Ehrenpokal der Luftwaffe) on 5 October 1940. The Gruppe was withdrawn from the English Channel on 31 October and relocated to Krefeld Airfield for a period of rest and replenishment. With eleven aerial victories to his credit, at the time Bennemann was the second most successful fighter pilot of the Gruppe.

On 27 December, the Gruppe moved to Katwijk aan Zee in the Netherlands. In early 1941, the Gruppe received new orders and began preparations for relocation to Sicily which were later revoked. Consequently, the entire I. Gruppe remained at Katwijk aan Zee where it was tasked with patrolling the Dutch coast area and German Bight, the three Staffeln were then deployed at various airfields on the Dutch, German and Danish North Sea coast. On 27 April, Bennemann was appointed Staffelkapitän (Squadron Leader) of 3. Staffel of JG 52. He replaced Oberleutnant Helmut Kühle who was transferred.

=== War against the Soviet Union ===
On 22 June, German forces had launched Operation Barbarossa, the invasion of the Soviet Union. On 21 September 1941, I. Gruppe of JG 52 was ordered to relocate to the Eastern Front. With stopovers at Dortmund, Magdeburg, and Warsaw, the Gruppe arrived in Orsha on 29 September. In support for Operation Typhoon, also known as the Battle of Moscow, the Gruppe moved to an airfield named Ponyatovka, located approximately 30 kilometers (19 miles) southwest of Roslavl, on 2 October. The following day, Bennemann claimed his first aerial victory on the Eastern Front when he shot down a Polikarpov I-16 fighter.

I./JG 52 insignia

On 1 February 1942, I. Gruppe was withdrawn from combat operations and was moved to Smolensk and then further west to Orsha. From 8 to 12 February the Gruppe took a train to Jesau near Königsberg, present-day Kaliningrad in Russia, for a period of recuperation and replenishment where they received new Bf 109 F-4 aircraft. The Gruppe was ordered to Olmütz, present-day Olomouc in Czech Republic, on 11 April. On 17 May, I. Gruppe relocated to Artyomovsk, present-day Bakhmut. On 14 June, Bennemann was appointed Gruppenkommandeur (group commander) of I. Gruppe of JG 52. He succeeded Hauptmann Karl-Heinz Leesmann who was transferred. On 26 June, the Gruppe moved to Bilyi Kolodyaz, approximately 10 kilometers (6.2 miles) southeast of Vovchansk, and was fighting in support of Case Blue, the strategic summer offensive in southern Russia with the objective to capture the oil fields of Baku, Grozny and Maykop.

To support German forces fighting in the Battle of the Caucasus, I. Gruppe relocated to an airfield at Kerch, in the east of Crimea, on 2 August. At the time, the Gruppe was moved around as a kind of fire brigade, deployed in areas where the Soviet Air Forces was particular active. The Gruppe then moved to Oryol on 15 August. A Petlyakov Pe-2 bomber shot down by Bennemann on 23 August was I. Gruppe's 600 aerial victory to date. Bennemann was awarded the Knight's Cross of the Iron Cross (Ritterkreuz des Eisernen Kreuzes) on 2 October 1942. His 62nd aerial victory claimed over a Mikoyan-Gurevich MiG-3 fighter on 2 November was the 800th aerial victory of I. Gruppe. By the End of 1942, Bennemann had claimed 72 aerial victories, making him the leading active fighter pilot of I. Gruppe at the time.

On 10 May 1943, Benemann was severely wounded by the explosion of an incendiary bomb at Charkow-Woitschenko Airfield. During his convalescence, he was replaced by Hauptmann Johannes Wiese and Hauptmann Gerhard Barkhorn as commander of I. Gruppe. Command of the Gruppe officially passed to Wiese on 5 October.

=== Wing commander ===
Bennemann was appointed Geschwaderkommodore (wing commander) of Jagdgeschwader 53 (JG 53—53rd Fighter Wing) on 9 November 1943. He took over command from Oberst Günther Freiherr von Maltzahn who had been transferred on 4 October. Intermittently, the Geschwader had been led by both Major Friedrich-Karl Müller and Major Kurt Ubben. On 25 April 1944, he shot down a USAAF B-24 over Bologna to claim his 90th victory. However, his Bf 109G-6 (Werknummer 163 314—factory number) "Black < 3" was hit by defensive fire and Bennemann was again wounded, baling out successfully.

On 22 June 1944, Soviet forces launched Operation Bagration which led to the annihilation of Army Group Centre during the following weeks. In support of the 3rd Panzer Army, the Geschwaderstab of JG 53 relocated to Vilna. Here, Bennemann was tasked with organizing the supply missions for Vilna. On 8 July, the encirclement of Vilna by Soviet forces was imminent, and the Geschwaderstab was ordered to relocate to Germany. On 18 July, Bennnemann was promoted to Oberstleutnant (lieutenant colonel). Following the brief interlude on the Eastern Front, the Geschwaderstab was based at Wunstorf near Hannover in Germany. On 20 August, Bennemann led the Stabsschwarm to Attichy in France That evening, Bennenmann flew to Reims where he met with Major Heinrich Bär, the Geschwaderkommodore of Jagdgeschwader 3 "Udet" (JG 3—3rd Fighter Wing), to discuss operational conditions in France. On 29 October, Bennemann claimed his 93rd and last aerial victory. That day, he led the Geschwaderstab, II., III. and IV. Gruppe on a Defense of the Reich mission against the United States Army Air Forces (USAAF). At 11:45, the Luftwaffe fighters encountered a formation of approximately 35 North American P-51 Mustang fighters of the 354th Fighter Group in the area between Bruchsal and Böckingen. Shortly after, the USAAF fighters were joined by Republic P-47 Thunderbolt fighters. In this encounter, Luftwaffe pilots claimed five P-51s shot down, including one by Bennemann. USAAF records show that four P-51s were lost in this engagement. The 354th Fighter Group claimed 24 aerial victories, and damaging ten further Bf 109s while JG 53 reported the loss of 15 aircraft shot down, including ten pilots killed in action.

In early 1945, Bennemann joined other high-ranking pilots in the "Fighter Pilots' Revolt incident" which escalated in a meeting with Hermann Göring on 22 January 1945. This was an attempt to reinstate Adolf Galland who had been dismissed for outspokenness regarding the Oberkommando der Luftwaffe (Luftwaffe high command), and had been replaced by Gordon Gollob as General der Jagdflieger. The meeting was held at the Haus der Flieger in Berlin and was attended by a number of high-ranking fighter pilot leaders which included Bennemann, Lützow, Hermann Graf, Gerhard Michalski, Hannes Trautloft, Kurt Bühligen, Erich Leie and Herbert Ihlefeld, and their antagonist Göring supported by his staff Bernd von Brauchitsch and Karl Koller. The fighter pilots, with Lützow taking the lead as spokesman, criticized Göring and made him personally responsible for the decisions taken which contributed to the lost air war over Europe.

== Later life ==
Following World War II, Bennemann attended university attaining a Doctor of Medical Dentistry, abbreviated as Dr. med. dent. (Doctor medicinae dentariae). He then worked as a dentist in his own practice. Bennemann died on 17 November 2007 at the age of 92 in Bad Sassendorf.

== Summary of career ==
=== Aerial victory claims ===
According to US historian David T. Zabecki, Bennemann was credited with 93 aerial victories. Obermaier also list Bennemann with 93 aerial victories claimed in over 400 combat missions. This figure includes 77 claims on the Eastern Front and 16 over the Western Allies, including one four-engine bomber. Spick lists him with 92 aerial victories with 70 on the Eastern Front and 22 on the Western Front. Mathews and Foreman, authors of Luftwaffe Aces — Biographies and Victory Claims, researched the German Federal Archives and found records for 89 aerial victory claims, plus four further unconfirmed claims. This figure of confirmed claims includes 76 aerial victories on the Eastern Front and 14 on the Western Front, including one four-engined bomber.

Victory claims were logged to a map-reference (PQ = Planquadrat), for example "PQ 6083". The Luftwaffe grid map (Jägermeldenetz) covered all of Europe, western Russia and North Africa and was composed of rectangles measuring 15 minutes of latitude by 30 minutes of longitude, an area of about 360 square miles (930 km^{2}). These sectors were then subdivided into 36 smaller units to give a location area 3 km × 4 km (1.9 mi × 2.5 mi) in size.

Chronicle of aerial victories
This and the ♠ (Ace of spades) indicates those aerial victories which made Bennemann an "ace-in-a-day", a term which designates a fighter pilot who has shot down five or more airplanes in a single day. This and the – (dash) indicates unconfirmed aerial victory claims for which Bennemann did not receive credit. This and the ? (question mark) indicates information discrepancies listed by Prien, Stemmer, Rodeike, Bock, Mathews and Foreman.
Claim	Date	Time	Type	Location	Claim	Date	Time	Type	Location
– 2. Staffel of Jagdgeschwader 52 – Battle of Britain and on the English Channel — 3 August – 30 October 1940
1	26 August 1940	12:50	Spitfire	Dover	8	15 September 1940	15:40	Hurricane	Thames Estuary
2	31 August 1940	13:50	Hurricane	southern edge of London	9	24 September 1940	14:35	Spitfire	10 km (6.2 mi) off Dover
3	1 September 1940	11:45	Spitfire	Sittingbourne	10	24 September 1940	14:40	Spitfire	off Dover
4	2 September 1940	14:00	Spitfire	Canterbury	— ? (Note: This unconfirmed claim is not listed by Prien, Stemmer, Rodeike and Bock.)	27 September 1940	—	Spitfire	
5	7 September 1940	17:55	Hurricane	London	11	12 October 1940	17:25	Spitfire	southeast of London
6	15 September 1940	15:30	Hurricane	Thames Estuary	— ?	28 October 1940	—	Hurricane	
7? (Note: According to Mathews and Foreman, this claim is unconfirmed.)	15 September 1940	15:30	Hurricane	Thames Estuary					
– 2. Staffel of Jagdgeschwader 52 – On the Western Front — 27 December 1940 – 23 September 1941
? (Note: This claim is not listed by Prien, Stemmer, Rodeike and Bock.)	14 April 1941	12:27	Blenheim	vicinity of Breskens					
– 3. Staffel of Jagdgeschwader 52 – Operation Barbarossa — 2 October – 5 December 1941
12	3 October 1941	15:10	I-16		16	27 November 1941	09:55	DB-3	
13	28 October 1941	14:15	I-153		17	16 November 1941	09:53	Pe-2	
14	28 October 1941	14:25	Il-2		18	2 December 1941	14:20	I-61 (MiG-3)	
15	29 October 1941	08:17	I-18 (MiG-1)						
– 3. Staffel of Jagdgeschwader 52 – On the Eastern Front — 19 May – 13 June 1942
19	24 May 1942	18:50	Yak-1		24	1 June 1942	06:52	Il-2	
20	26 May 1942	15:43	Pe-2		25	1 June 1942	18:44	Yak-1	
21	27 May 1942	16:05	Il-2	PQ 6083	26	2 June 1942	05:30	Pe-2	
22	27 May 1942	19:20	Il-2	PQ 7071	27	12 June 1942	17:20	LaGG-3	PQ 70221
23	31 May 1942	16:45	I-153	PQ 60864; 10 km (6.2 mi) south of Petrovskaja					
– Stab I. Gruppe of Jagdgeschwader 52 – On the Eastern Front — 14 June 1942 – 3 February 1943
28	22 June 1942	07:35	LaGG-3		46	23 August 1942	06:42	Pe-2	PQ 54452 west of Zubkovo
29	22 June 1942	07:55	LaGG-3		47	23 August 1942	06:43? (Note: According to Mathews and Foreman claimed at 06:42.)	Il-2	PQ 54452 west of Zubkovo
30	24 June 1942	08:25	LaGG-3		48	27 August 1942	14:24? (Note: According to Mathews and Foreman claimed at 14:27.)	Il-2	PQ 46362
31	24 June 1942	11:10	LaGG-3		49	3 September 1942	06:40	LaGG-3	PQ 57752; Sea of Azov
32	25 June 1942	14:20	Hurricane		50	3 September 1942	14:35	Il-2	PQ 46253
33	26 June 1942	10:19	LaGG-3		51	4 September 1942	05:52? (Note: According to Mathews and Foreman claimed at 05:58.)	Pe-2	PQ 46412
34	26 June 1942	10:35	Hurricane		52	23 September 1942	11:50	LaGG-3	PQ 40843; 30 km (19 mi) north-northeast of Grebenka
35	4 July 1942	08:55	LaGG-3		53	24 September 1942	16:35? (Note: According to Mathews and Foreman claimed at 16:30.)	LaGG-3	PQ 4915
36	31 July 1942	10:00? (Note: According to Mathews and Foreman claimed at 10:40.)	Yak-1	PQ 07181	54	16 October 1942	09:55	MiG-3	PQ 49432 vicinity of Srednyaya Akhtuba
37	1 August 1942	14:45	Yak-1	PQ 07853	55	17 October 1942	10:10	MiG-3	PQ 49273; 15 km (9.3 mi) east of Stalingrad
38	4 August 1942	05:13	Il-2	PQ 66453; Sea of Asov, 35 km (22 mi) north-northeast of Kerch	56	24 October 1942	11:45? (Note: According to Mathews and Foreman claimed at 11:05.)	Yak-1	PQ 49131; 10 km (6.2 mi) north of Grebenka
39	5 August 1942	10:12	I-153	PQ 6523	57	24 October 1942	14:20	La-5	PQ 49272; 10 km (6.2 mi) east of Stalingrad
40	5 August 1942	10:13	I-153	PQ 6523	58	24 October 1942	14:31? (Note: According to Mathews and Foreman claimed at 14:35.)	Pe-2	PQ 49471; 30 km (19 mi) south-southeast of Stalingrad
41	10 August 1942	15:50	MBR-2	PQ 8552; 10 km (6.2 mi) east of Novocherkassk	59	25 October 1942	16:05	Yak-1	PQ 49462; 45 km (28 mi) east-southeast of Stalingrad
42	13 August 1942	08:18	LaGG-3	PQ 06771 vicinity of Bondarenka	60	29 October 1942	15:30	MiG-3	PQ 49294; 30 km (19 mi) east of Stalingrad
43	21 August 1942	08:40	U-2	PQ 55763; Black Sea	61	1 November 1942	11:45	MiG-3	PQ 49452; 30 km (19 mi) southeast of Stalingrad
44	22 August 1942	08:15? (Note: According to Mathews and Foreman claimed at 08:35.)	LaGG-3	PQ 54433 northwest of Bolkhov	62	2 November 1942	09:50	MiG-3	PQ 59143
45	22 August 1942	13:15	LaGG-3	PQ 64173					
According to Prien, Stemmer, Rodeike and Bock, Bennemann claimed his 63rd aerial victory between 6 November and 31 December 1942. This claim is not listed by Mathews and Foreman.
64	26 December 1942	10:30	La-5	PQ 01762	69♠	28 December 1942	07:25? (Note: According to Mathews and Foreman claimed at 07:23.)	Il-2	PQ 01863
65	26 December 1942	10:50	MiG-1	PQ 01572	70♠	28 December 1942	07:33? (Note: According to Mathews and Foreman claimed at 07:30.)	Il-2	PQ 01763
66	27 December 1942	11:29	Pe-2	PQ 01731	71♠	28 December 1942	10:00	Pe-2	PQ 01783
67♠	28 December 1942	07:20? (Note: According to Mathews and Foreman claimed at 07:20.)	Il-2	PQ 01864	72♠	28 December 1942	10:03	Pe-2	PQ 01763
68♠	28 December 1942	07:23? (Note: According to Mathews and Foreman claimed at 07:22.)	Il-2	PQ 01843					
– Stab I. Gruppe of Jagdgeschwader 52 – On the Eastern Front — 4 February – 10 May 1943
73	17 March 1943	12:45	La-5	PQ 35 Ost 61664; 10 km (6.2 mi) north of Volchansk	81	17 April 1943	11:16	LaGG-3	PQ 34 Ost 75492, vicinity of Novorossiysk; Black Sea, 10 km (6.2 mi) west of Gelendzhik
74	18 March 1943	16:10	LaGG-3	PQ 35 Ost 61891; 20 km (12 mi) south-southwest of Bely Kolodez	82	17 April 1943	11:23	LaGG-3	PQ 34 Ost 75424, 5 km (3.1 mi) south of Novorossiysk; 4 km (2.5 mi) east of Novorossiysk
75	19 March 1943	10:13	La-5	PQ 35 Ost 60211; 25 km (16 mi) east of Kharkiv	83	17 April 1943	15:07	P-39	PQ 34 Ost 75431, vicinity of Novorossiysk; 3 km (1.9 mi) southeast of Novorossiysk
76	19 March 1943	10:18	La-5	PQ 35 Ost 60212	84	17 April 1943	15:09	P-39	PQ 34 Ost 75433, vicinity of Novorossiysk southeast of Novorossiysk
77	19 March 1943	13:47	Pe-2	PQ 35 Ost 61851; 25 km (16 mi) west-southwest of Bely Kolodez	85	21 April 1943	09:25	LaGG-3	PQ 34 Ost 75432 northeast of Novorossiysk
78	19 March 1943	13:48	Pe-2	PQ 35 Ost 61851; 25 km (16 mi) west-southwest of Bely Kolodez	86	27 April 1943	14:02? (Note: According to Mathews and Foreman claimed at 14:52.)	Il-2	PQ 34 Ost 85133 east of Chablj
79	26 March 1943	09:15	MiG-3	PQ 35 Ost 71794; 25 km (16 mi) southeast of Bely Kolodez	87	9 May 1943	10:03	I-16	PQ 34 Ost 9884
80	29 March 1943	12:23	Il-2 m.H. (Note: The "m.H." refers to an Ilyushin Il-2 with rear gunner (mit Heckschütze).)	PQ 35 Ost 61451; 15 km (9.3 mi) northeast of Belograd	88	9 May 1943	10:06	I-16	PQ 34 Ost 9874
– Stab of Jagdgeschwader 53 – On the Italian Front — 9 November 1943 – June 1944
89	15 December 1943	11:15	B-26	southwest of Ceccano	90	25 April 1944	11:33	B-24	15 km (9.3 mi) southwest of Forlì
– Stab of Jagdgeschwader 53 – In Defense of the Reich — September – December 1944
91? (Note: This claim is not listed by Mathews and Foreman.)	8 October 1944	—	P-47		93	29 October 1944	11:45	P-51	vicinity of Jöhlingen
92?	October 1944	—	P-47						

=== Awards ===
- Iron Cross (1939) 2nd and 1st Class
- Honor Goblet of the Luftwaffe (5 October 1940)
- German Cross in Gold on 27 July 1942 as Hauptmann in the I./Jagdgeschwader 52
- Knight's Cross of the Iron Cross on 2 October 1942 as Hauptmann and Gruppenkommandeur of the I./Jagdgeschwader 52

== Notes ==
Military offices
Preceded by Major Kurt Ubben	Commander of Jagdgeschwader 53 Pik As; 9 November 1943 – 27 April 1945	Succeeded by none
