= Jagdgeschwader 52 =

German World War II fighter wing

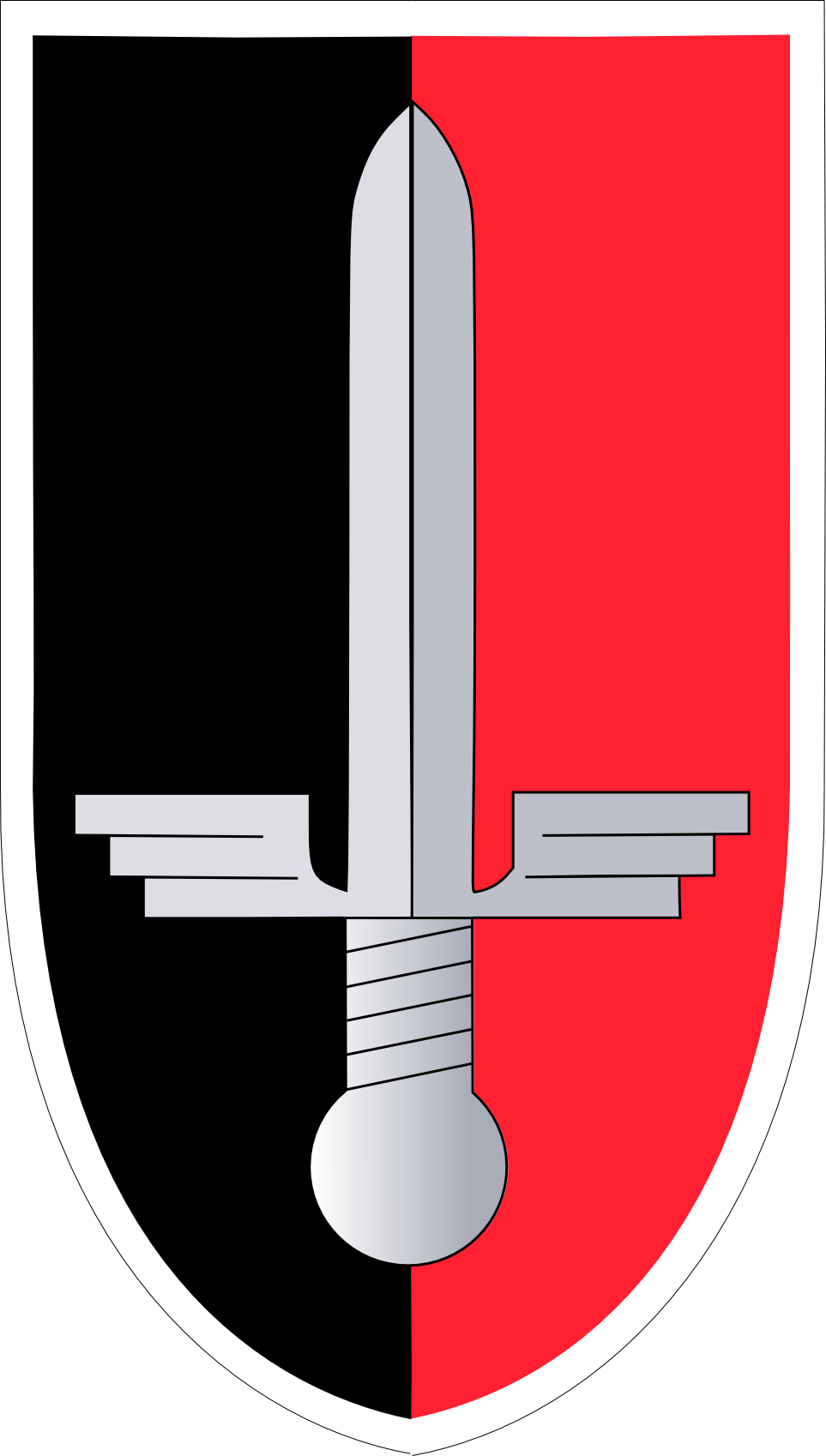
- Winged sword unit emblem of JG 52
- Active: 1939–45
- Country: Nazi Germany
- Branch: Luftwaffe
- Type: Fighter Aircraft
- Role: Air superiority
- Size: Air Force Wing
- Fighter Aircraft: Messerschmitt Bf 109
- Engagements: Western Front: Battle of France; Battle of Britain; Eastern Front (World War II): German-Soviet air war 22 June 1941; Operation Barbarossa; Battle of Stalingrad; Battle of the Caucasus; Battle of Kursk

Commanders
- Notable commanders: Hermann Graf

Aircraft flown
- Fighter: Bf 109

Jagdgeschwader 52 (JG 52) (Note: For an explanation of Luftwaffe unit designations, see Organization of the Luftwaffe during World War II.) was a German World War II fighter Geschwader (wing) that exclusively used the Messerschmitt Bf 109 throughout the war. The unit originally formed near Munich in November 1938, then moved to a base near Stuttgart. JG 52 became the most successful fighter-Geschwader of the war, with a claimed total of more than 10,000 victories over enemy aircraft during World War II. It was the unit of the top three scoring flying aces of all time, Erich Hartmann, Gerhard Barkhorn and Günther Rall.

== Operational history ==
=== Formation ===
In 1935, the Ministry of Aviation designed an air force (Luftwaffe) of 2,370 active planes by April 1938, which would require the production of about 18,000 planes to cover attrition. When 1938 came, the Luftwaffe split its fighter groups into light "Jagdgeschwader" flying the Messerschmitt Bf 109, for home defense, and heavy fighter wings called Zerstörergeschwader flying the Messerschmitt Bf 110, for offensive operations, based on doctrine devised over the 1930s. Although the Luftwaffe simply could not meet its mandated pre-Munich Agreement size, five times its then current size, aircraft poured into the various Geschwader around the country.

At the Ingolstadt-Manching base, 37 miles (60 km) north of Munich, I./JG 433 was activated as the first Gruppe of Luftflotte 3 under the command of Hauptmann Dietrich Graf von Pfeil und Klein-Ellguth, who had commanded a provisional air unit during the Sudeten crisis. After the Munich Agreement, aircraft flooded into JG 433 in spite of the unit not even having a dozen pilots. By December, it had an almost full complement of Bf 109Ds, but a severe freeze around Christmas 1938 rendered them all inoperable. Improving weather and incoming trainees in the first weeks of 1939 improved JG 433's situation. To train the new pilots was the task of Klein-Ellguth's Staffelkäpitane, Oberleutnants Wolfgang Ewald, Adolf Galland, and Alfons Klein. All three had been members of the Condor Legion during the Spanish Civil War. Klein was killed in a crash on 18 February 1939 and was replaced by Oberleutant Helmut Kühle, also a Condor Legion veteran, on 1 March 1939. Over the month of March, JG 433 received some new Bf 109Es and was transferred to a grass airfield at Böblingen, near Stuttgart. The Luftwaffe reorganized on 1 May 1939, introducing the "block" designations for air wings. Luftflotte 3 was assigned blocks 51–75 for its fighter units. I./JG 433 was redesignated I./JG 52.

=== Mobilization and Western Front ===
Jagdgeschwader 52 spent the summer of 1939 training and practicing bomber defense around Stuttgart and along the western German border. In June, the unit transferred again, to another grassy field at Wengerohr on the upper Moselle to train for wartime operations. Because of deficiencies in the Luftwaffe's support structure, this was accomplished by requisitioning civilian trucks.

JG 52's final pre-war deployment was to the island of Wangerooge, near Wilhelmshaven, to train in dogfighting. In mid-August 1939, it moved back to Böblingen in time for the mobilization of the Wehrmacht and prepared to defend Stuttgart and its factories from French bombers. On 26 August 1939, 72 hours before Germany invaded Poland, I./JG 52 was assigned to Luftflotte 2, subordinated to JG 26 and JG 77, and ordered to the Bonn-Hangelar base, where it moved three days later. As I./JG 52 left, its remaining Bf 190Ds were assigned to the newly-formed 11./(N)JG 72.

==== Sitzkrieg and Battle of France ====
54 hours into the invasion of Poland, France and the United Kingdom declared war on Germany on 3 September 1939, beginning the Second World War. The remainder of 1939 have been dubbed the "Phony War" or sitzkrieg, as German, French, and British ground forces idled and dug in. Air units, however, mounted local patrols and recon sorties as the weather permitted.

On 6 September 1939, 11./JG 72 scored JG 52's first kill, as well as the first German aerial victory on the Western front. A French ANF Les Mureaux 115, of the reconnaissance unit GAO 553, was spotted while the Staffel was patrolling south of Karlsruhe and intercepted. On 6 October, 2./JG 52 brought down a LeO 451 performing reconnaissance on Luftwaffe bases in the Ruhr. The shooting down of a Bristol Blenheim IV from No. 114 Squadron RAF, as it was performing reconnaissance of German defenses, a week later is attributed to 1./JG 52. In the first week of October, II./JG 52 was established from 1./JG 71 and 11./JG 72, as was Stab./JG 52, turning JG 52 into a Geschwader of three Gruppen commanded by Major Hubert Merhart von Bernegg. Stab./JG 52 and II./JG 52 transferred from Böblingen to Mannheim. On 8 November, II./JG 52 made its first two kills as a formation of JG 52: a French observation balloon near Karlsruhe and a Morane MS 406 near Bitche.

Over the rest of November 1939, the Luftwaffe reorganized its fighter units on the Westwall in preparation for the offensives of the next year. As part of this, I./JG 52 was transferred to Lachen-Speyerdorf on 21 November and was placed under the control of Luftflotte 3 along with the rest of JG 52. That same day, Hptm. Klein-Ellguth and his wingman Leutnant Christoph Geller were shot down by French fighters. Both survived, but Klein-Ellguth was too severely injured to return to service. JG 52 suffered its first fatality on 22 November when Unteroffizier Hans-Joachim Hellwig's plane suddenly went into a steep dive and crashed behind French lines while on a high-altitude patrol. Harsh winter weather brought aerial action to an end for the rest of 1939.

On 1 February 1940, II./JG 52 was moved to Speyer, then gave up men and material with I./JG 52 to form III./JG 52 late in the month. III./JG 52 trained at an airbase near Berlin for six weeks, then joined Stab./JG 52 at Sandhofen on 6 April 1940.

=== Eastern Front ===
During German-Soviet air war 22 June 1941 and Operation Barbarossa, the unit operated on the southern and central sectors of the front. During 1941–1942, with the Luftwaffe constantly on the offensive against vast numbers of the ill-equipped and poorly trained Soviet Air Force, the experienced and well-equipped JG 52 fighter pilots claimed numerous aircraft shot down.

By early 1942, JG 52 and JG 3 provided the fighter support along the southern sector of the Eastern Front. On 14 June 1942, based at an airfield at Grakowo, located approximately halfway between Kharkov and Kupiansk, Hauptmann Helmut Bennemann claimed JG 52s 2,000 aerial victory.

==== The Caucasus and Stalingrad offensives ====
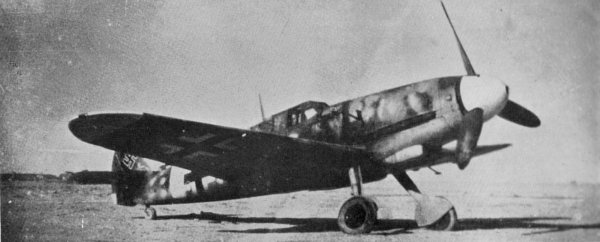
Messerschmitt Bf 109G4

In mid-July 1942, the Gruppen commenced re-equipment with the new Bf 109 G Gustav, and the wing continued covering the armoured spearhead offensive deep into the Caucasus. I. Gruppe by this time had become a highly mobile 'fire brigade' formation, sent at short notice to areas where fighter cover was quickly and urgently required. Shuttling between areas ranging from the Kerch Peninsula on the Black Sea to the Moscow Front, I./JG 52 was in constant action.

Although JG 52 was not directly involved in the final stages of the Battle of Stalingrad, III./JG 52 was used during the push towards the Caucasian oil fields in the south during August–September 1942, and II./JG 52 supported the attempted break-through by the 4th Panzer Army in late 1942. During this time, the 4,000th victory mark was reached, on 10 December 1942. The first half of 1943 saw action centered around the Strait of Kerch and the Crimea. By mid March, II. and III. Gruppen had the task of protecting 17th Army's main line of retreat. On 20 April 1943, Hauptmann Günther Rall scored the Geschwader's 5,000th victory.

==== Battle of Kursk ====
I. and III./JG 52 moved into Ukraine in July 1943 in preparation for the massive Kursk offensive. By this time, German pilots faced the new generation of advanced Soviet fighter aircraft (such as the Yak-9 or La-5 of the La-5FN version) and improved battlefield tactics on the part of Soviet pilots. An aerial victory claimed by Oberleutnant Paul-Heinrich Dähne on 7 July during Operation Citadel was counted as 800th aerial victory by I. Gruppe and the 6,000th of JG 52 overall.

=== Defence of the Reich ===
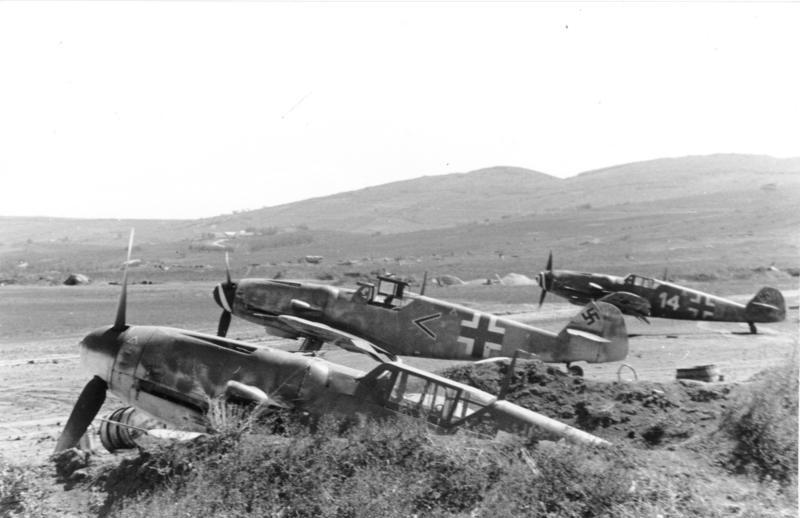
Bf 109G6’s of I./JG 52 at Anapa in Russia in 1943.

The withdrawal of JG 3 in August 1943 left JG 52 as the sole complete fighter wing on the Eastern Front. Constantly on the move, JG 52 now operated from makeshift and temporary airstrips close to the rapidly contracting frontline.

By November 1943, the loss of Kiev threatened the stability of the entire Southern sector front, the whole of JG 52 being brought together again to help bolster defences. By December 1943 JG 52 had reached 8,000 victories. Over the Uman region, III./JG 52 claimed 50 victories in 60 days. III./JG 52 became its most successful Gruppe, claiming its 3,500th victory on 21 March 1944. By the end of the month, III./JG 52 was based in Poland.

On 10 May 1944, the 9,000th claim was made, with the 10,000 mark passed on 2 September 1944 by Adolf Borchers. The last German troops left the Crimea in May 1944, II./JG 52 retiring from battle a week earlier. Artillery fire and constant air raids had caused steady aircraft losses. A retreat to Romania followed soon after. A new opponent appeared at this stage, with elements of the USAAF 15th Air Force bombing the Ploiești oil fields in Romania. During JG 52's six-week defense, some 15 US aircraft were shot down, but by this time, attrition had reduced II./JG 52 to just nine operational fighters.

With the Normandy invasion underway, JG 52 was weakened by the removal of three Staffeln for service in the West. New 2, 4 and 7 Staffeln would be activated later in the year, with each JG 52 Gruppen now expanded to four Staffeln.

III./JG 52 was now seconded to the Central front, attached to elements of JG 51. By the spring of 1945, I. and III./JG 52 were stationed within Czechoslovakia, with II./JG 52 based in Austria. Although the units surrendered to the American forces at the end of the war; most of the I. and III. Gruppe personnel were handed over to the Soviet Army.

== Organizational structure ==
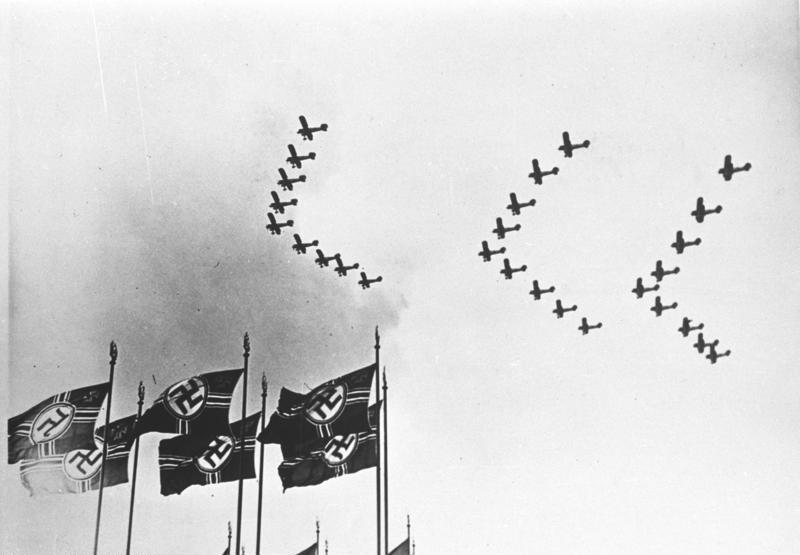
Luftwaffe aircraft flying in formation, 1937.

Jagdgeschwader 52 followed the standard Luftwaffe organization for a fighter wing (Jagdgeschwader). As a Geschwader, equivalent in function to a USAAF Wing or RAF Group, but with a permanent command structure, JG 52 was commanded by a Geschwaderkommodore, usually a Major, Oberstleutnant, or Oberst. The Geschwaderkommodore commanded three or four Gruppe, identified by Roman numeral and their unit number (e.g. I./JG 52, II./JG 52, and III./JG 52), and commanded by a Major or Hauptmann, designated the Gruppenkommandeur. The Gruppe then was divided into three or four Staffeln that were each commanded by a Staffelkapitän, usually a Hauptmann, Oberleutnant, or sometimes a Leutnant and ordered by Arabic numeral and abbreviated, for example as 5./JG 1 rather than 5 Staffel II. Gruppe, JG 1. In total, every Geschwader contained on average 124 planes. When the Luftwaffe reorganized in Summer 1939, there were Geschwader with only two Gruppen.

=== Stab./JG 52 ===
The establishment of Stab./JG 52, the command group (Geschwaderstab), at Böblingen had been planned for the third week of August 1939, but was delayed by the invasion of Poland. Late September finally saw the formation and posting of Stab./JG 52.

=== I./JG 52 ===
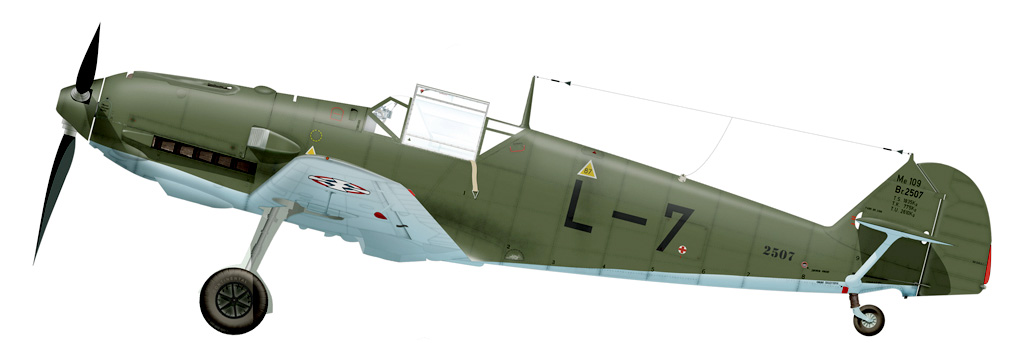
A Bf 109E, as would have been flown by JG 52. This particular Bf 109 is an E-3 type.

As JG 433, I. Gruppe flew D and E models of the Bf 109, and began transitioning to the F series while based in the Netherlands in mid and late 1941. I. Gruppe flew the Bf 109Fs for a year until moving to the G models while stationed at Bakhmut (then Artemivsk) and flew them for the rest of the war, though I./JG 52 also flew the Bf 109K in the last year of the war.

Initial formation of I./JG 52
JG 52 Unit	Date	Original unit	Location	Aircraft type
Stab I./JG 52	1 May 1939	Stab I./JG 433	Böblingen	Bf 109E
1./JG 52	1 May 1939	1./JG 433	Böblingen	Bf 109E
2./JG 52	1 May 1939	2./JG 433	Böblingen	Bf 109E
3./JG 52	1 May 1939	3./JG 433	Böblingen	Bf 109E
4./JG 52	15 August 1944	New	Millerovo	Bf 109G

=== II./JG 52 ===
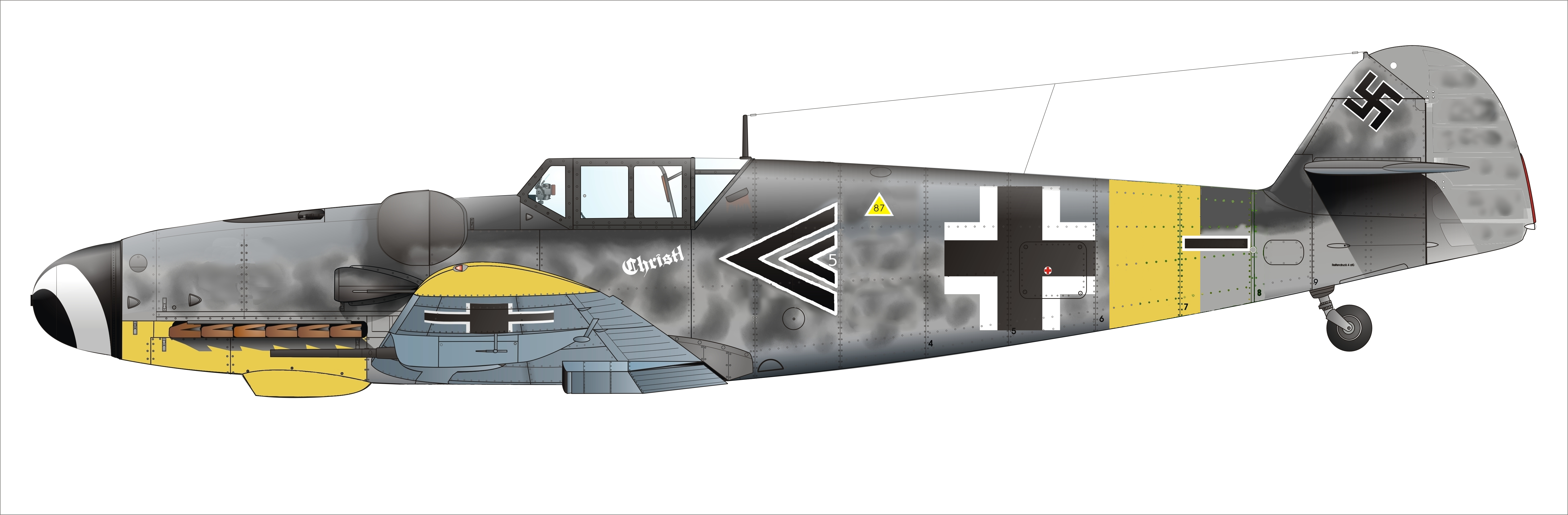
The Bf 109G6 of Gerhard Barkhorn as it would have appeared in September 1942.

Two Staffeln, JG 72 and 71, were raised in the last weeks of peacetime as stopgap formations with the intent of forming a second Gruppe for JG 52. The first was 11.(N)/Jagdgeschwader 72, activated on 15 July 1939 as a night fighter Staffel with Arado Ar 68Fs. It was commanded by Oberleutant August-Wilhelm Schumann and based at Böblingen with I./JG 52. When the latter formation moved bases on 26–29 August 1939, 11./JG 72 was equipped with its Bf 109Ds. On the same day, 1./Jagdgeschwader 71 was activated at Schleißheim with Avia B-534s, commanded by Oberleutant Heinz Schumann. Until officially merging into II./JG 52 in early October 1939, the two Staffeln appear to have continued using their designations while being referred to as "Jagdgruppe Schumann" or as 4. and 5./JG 52.

Initial formation of II./JG 52
JG 52 Unit	Date	Original unit	Location	Aircraft type
Stab II./JG 52	1 May 1939	New	Böblingen	Bf 109E
4./JG 52	1 May 1939	1./JG 71	Böblingen	Bf 109E
5./JG 52	1 May 1939	11./JG 72	Böblingen	Bf 109E
6./JG 52	1 May 1939	New	Böblingen	Bf 109E
7./JG 52	15 August 1944	New	Kraków	Bf 109G
8./JG 52	15 August 1944	New	Kraków	Bf 109G

=== III./JG 52 ===
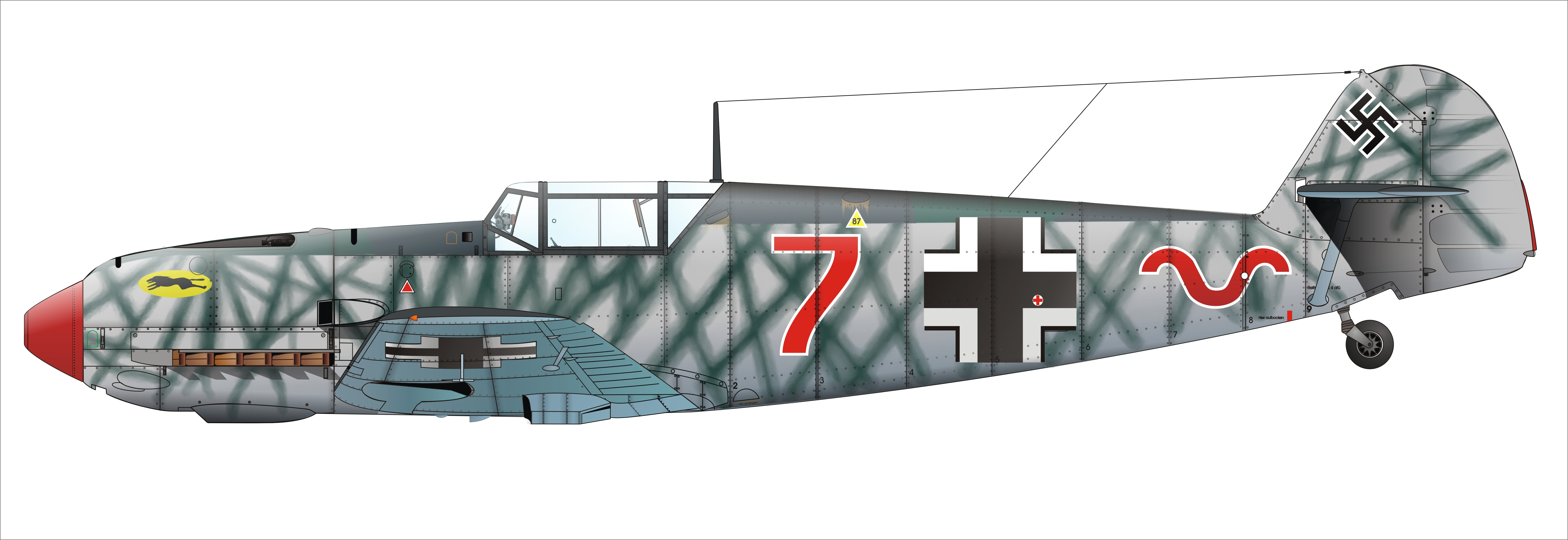
A Bf 109E-1, whose markings indicate it as belonging to 7./JG 52.

III./JG 52 was formed from men and equipment from I. and II./JG 52 on 1 March 1940 at Strausberg, 17 miles (27 km) east of Berlin.

The Gruppe was transferred out of JG 52 to I./JG 28, which was based at Pipera, Bucharest from October 1940 to 4 January 1941, at which point it resumed being III./JG 52.

As JG 28 and early III./JG 52, III. Gruppe flew the Bf 109E until being stationed in Bucharest, where they transitioned to the F model. III. Gruppe moved on to the G series, which the Gruppe used for the rest of the war, while stationed at Taganrog and Luhansk.

Initial formation of III./JG 52
JG 52 Unit	Date	Original unit	Location	Aircraft type
Stab III./JG 52	1 March 1940	New	Strasbourg	Bf 109E
7./JG 52	1 March 1940	New	Strasbourg	Bf 109E
8./JG 52	1 March 1940	New	Strasbourg	Bf 109E
9./JG 52	1 March 1940	New	Strasbourg	Bf 109E
10./JG 52	15 August 1944	9./JG 52	Vinnytsia	Bf 109G
11./JG 52	15 August 1944	New	Vinnytsia	Bf 109G
12./JG 52	15 August 1944	New	Vinnytsia	Bf 109G

=== 13./JG 52 ===
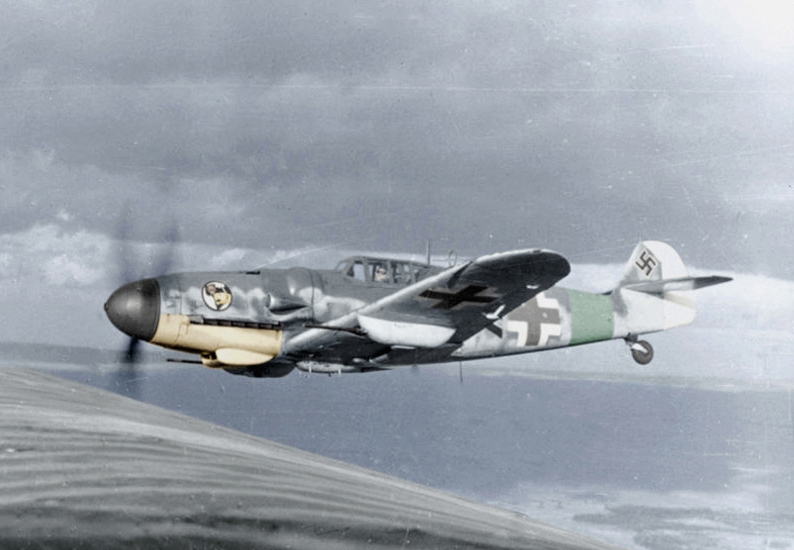
A Bf 109G6 of JG 27 in operation in 1943.

The 13th Staffel of JG 52, made up entirely of Slovak Luftwaffe personnel, was formed on 27 October 1941 in Piešťany, Slovakia and was disbanded in January 1944. As with the rest of JG 52, Staffel 13 only flew the Messerschmitt Bf 109. From its formation in October 1941, it flew the Bf 109E until transitioning to the F model at Krasnodar in January 1943. While being stationed at Kerch only a month later, they transitioned again to the G model series, which 13./JG 52 flew for the rest of the war.

Initial formation of 13. (Slow.)/JG 52
JG 52 Unit	Date	Original unit	Location	Aircraft type
13./JG 52	27 October 1941	New	Piešťany	Bf 109E

=== 15./JG 52 ===
15./JG 52 was one of two Croatian air squadrons raised for the Luftwaffe. The Staffel flew the Bf 109E from their formation until July 1942, when they transitioned into the Bf 109G, flying it until the end of the war for Croatia.

Initial formation of 15. (Kroat.)/JG 52
JG 52 Unit	Date	Original unit	Location	Aircraft type
15./JG 52	July 1941	New	Fürth	Bf 109E

== Noteworthy individuals ==
=== Commanders ===
• Major Hubert Merhart von Bernegg	19 August 1939	–	18 August 1940
• Major Hanns Trübenbach	19 August 1940	–	10 October 1941
• Major Wilhelm Lessmann	15 October 1941	–	2 June 1942 †
• Oberstleutnant Friedrich Beckh	3 June 1942	–	21 June 1942 †
• Major Herbert Ihlefeld	22 June 1942	–	28 October 1942
• Oberstleutnant Dietrich Hrabak	1 November 1942	–	30 September 1944
• Oberstleutnant Hermann Graf	1 October 1944	–	8 May 1945

=== Group commanders ===
==== I./JG 52 ====
Emblem of I./JG 52

• Hauptmann Dietrich Graf von Pfeil und Klein-Ellguth	1 November 1939	–	21 November 1939
• Hauptmann Siegfried von Eschwege	1 December 1939	–	26 August 1940
• Hauptmann Wolfgang Ewald	27 August 1940	–	24 May 1941
• Hauptmann Karl-Heinz Leesmann	25 May 1941	–	6 November 1941
• Hauptmann Helmut Bennemann	14 June 1942	–	12 November 1943
• Hauptmann Johannes Wiese	13 November 1943	–	20 May 1944
• Hauptmann Adolf Borchers	11 June 1944	–	31 January 1945
• Hauptmann Erich Hartmann	1 February 1945	–	8 May 1945

==== II./JG 52 ====
Emblem of II./JG 52

• Hauptmann Hans-Günther von Kornatzki	1 September 1939	–	26 August 1940
• Hauptmann Wilhelm Enßlen	27 August 1940	–	2 November 1940
• Hauptmann Erich Woitke	3 November 1940	–	28 February 1942
• Hauptmann Johannes Steinhoff	1 March 1942	–	24 March 1943
• Hauptmann Helmut Kühle	25 March 1943	–	31 August 1943
• Hauptmann Gerhard Barkhorn	1 September 1943	–	15 January 1945
• Hauptmann Wilhelm Batz	1 February 1945	–	8 May 1945

==== III./JG 52 ====
Emblem of III./JG 52

• Hauptmann Wolf-Heinrich von Houwald	1 March 1940	–	24 July 1940
• Major Alexander von Winterfeldt	1 August 1940	–	6 October 1940
• Major Gotthard Handrick	7 October 1940	–	22 June 1941
• Major Albert Blumensaat	23 June 1941	–	30 September 1941
• Major Hubertus von Bonin	1 October 1941	–	5 July 1943
• Hauptmann Günther Rall	6 July 1943	–	18 April 1944
• Major Wilhelm Batz	19 April 1944	–	31 January 1945
• Hauptmann Adolf Borchers	1 February 1945	–	8 May 1945
