= Prudki =

Prudki Прудки
- Khutor
- Location within Volgograd Oblast Location within Russia
- Coordinates: 50°04′N 43°00′E
- Country: Russia
- Region: Volgograd Oblast
- District: Mikhaylovka Urban Okrug
- Time zone: UTC+4:00

Prudki (Russian: Прудки) is a rural locality (a khutor) in Mikhaylovka Urban Okrug, Volgograd Oblast, Russia. The population was 62 as of 2010. There are 5 streets.

== Geography ==
Prudki is located 19 km west of Mikhaylovka. Katasonov is the nearest rural locality.
