= Bely Kolodez =

Bely Kolodez Белый Колодезь
- Selo
- Location within Belgorod Oblast Location within Russia
- Coordinates: 50°00′N 38°40′E
- Country: Russia
- Region: Belgorod Oblast
- District: Veydelevsky District
- Time zone: UTC+3:00

Bely Kolodez (Russian: Белый Колодезь) is a rural locality (a selo) and the administrative center of Belokolodezsky Rural Settlement, Veydelevsky District, Belgorod Oblast, Russia. In the 19th century the village was part of Belokolodezskaya volost, Valuysky Uyezd, Voronezh Governorate. The population was 1,465 as of 2010. There are 21 streets.

== Geography ==
Bely Kolodez is located 25 km southeast of Veydelevka (the district's administrative centre) by road.
