= Ehrenpokal der Luftwaffe =

WW2 German military decoration

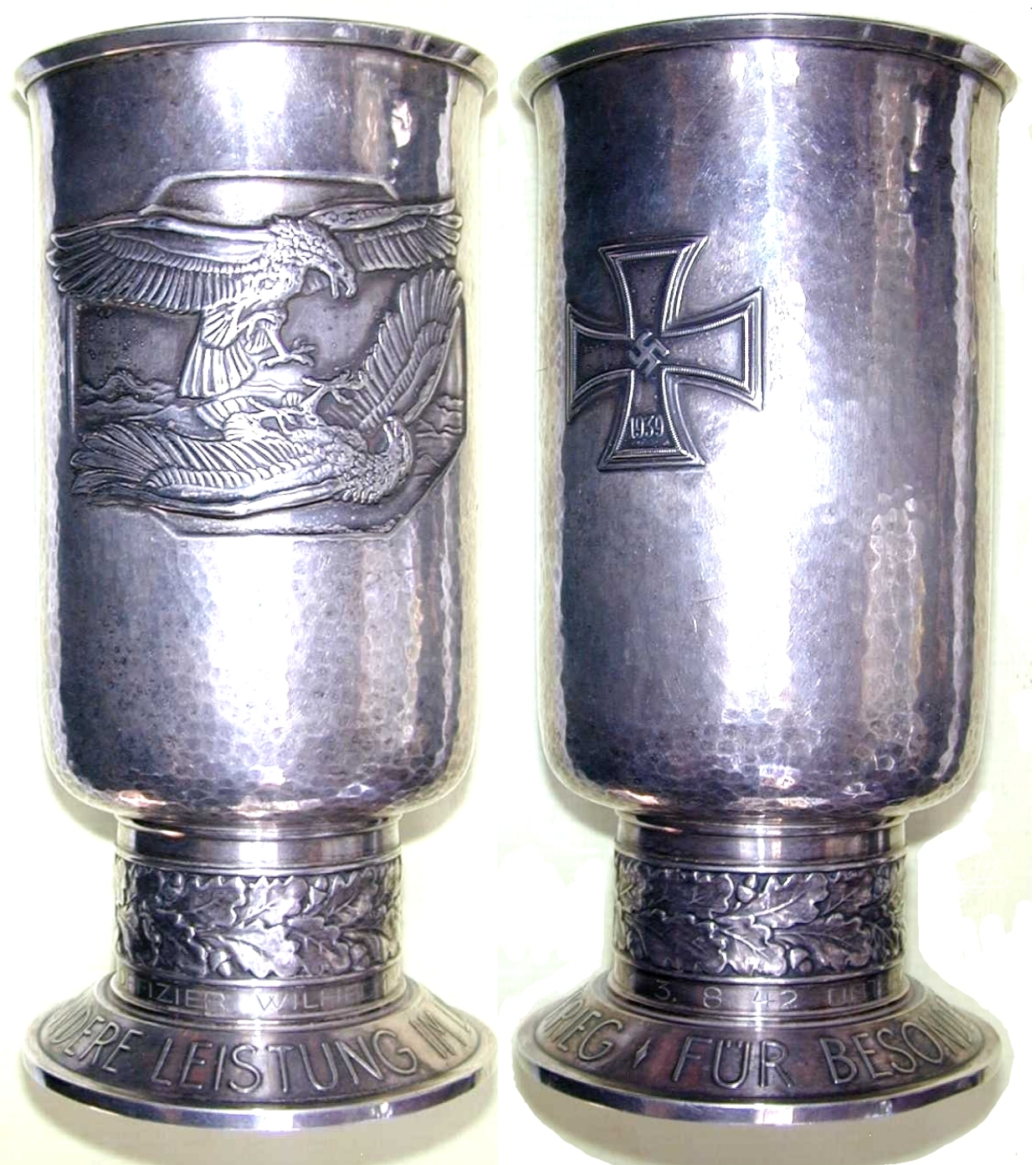
Honor Goblet of the Luftwaffe (Ehrenpokal der Luftwaffe)

The Ehrenpokal der Luftwaffe (Honor Goblet of the Luftwaffe) was a Luftwaffe award established on 27 February 1940 by Reichsmarschall Hermann Göring, the Reich Minister of Aviation and Commander-in-Chief of the Luftwaffe. It was officially known as the Ehrenpokal "für Besondere Leistung im Luftkrieg", or Honor Goblet "For Special Achievement in the Air War". The award was given only to flying personnel (pilots and aircrew). Recipients' named were published in the periodical Ehrenliste der Deutschen Luftwaffe (Honor List of the German Air Force). German archives indicate that approximately 58,000 were given "on paper", but only 13–15,000 goblets were actually awarded according to the records. The first airman to receive the goblet was Oberstleutnant Johann Schalk on 21 August 1940.

The award was made to aircrew who had already been awarded the Iron Cross First Class but whose performance was not considered to merit the German Cross or Knight's Cross of the Iron Cross. It was replaced by the Luftwaffe Honour Roll Clasp in January 1944.

The actual goblet was produced in two materials, fine silver (German: Feinsilber) or also in German Silver (German: Alpaka) or Nickel silver. The size is about 200 mm tall x 100 mm in diameter. The goblet was produced in two pieces which were fitted together into one unit. The obverse depicts two eagles in mortal combat, while the reverse bears an Iron Cross in high relief. Oak leaves and acorns adorn the stem. The legend "Für Besondere Leistung im Luftkrieg" are formed into the base.

== World War I predecessors ==
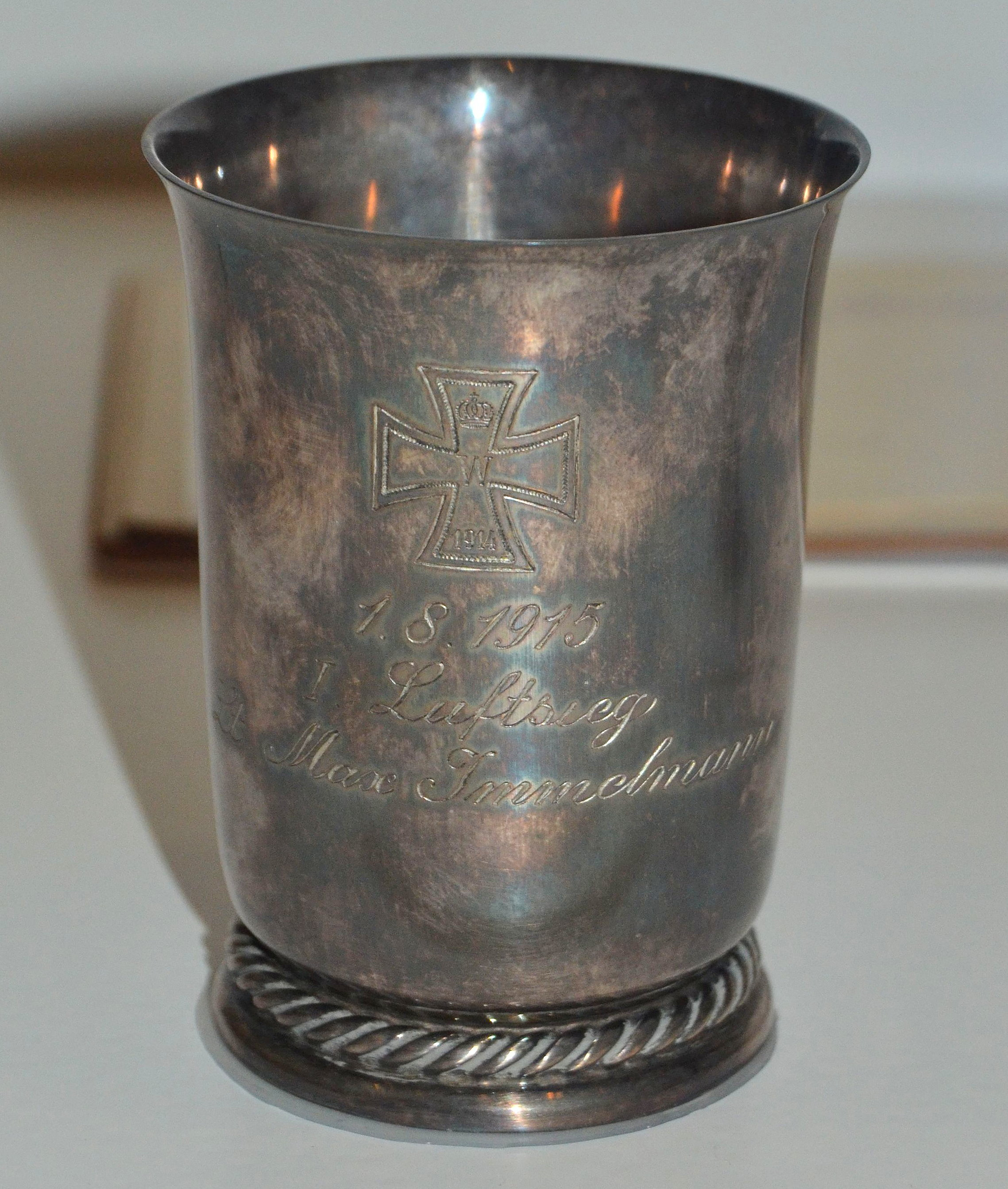
Silver beaker given to Max Immelmann, Bundeswehr Military History Museum

Although Göring considered the "Honor Goblet of the Luftwaffe" to be his "personal creation", it was not an original idea. It was based on a World War I aviation award, the Ehrenbecher für den Sieger im Luftkampf, or Honor Goblet for the Victor in Air Combat. This award was generally given upon one's first victory in aerial combat (although the actual award bestowal might come some time after the victory). It has been reported (although the late aviation historian Neal O'Connor, was unable to confirm it before his death), that the requirement for aerial victories may have increased later in the war, since air combat became more common. The total number of awards presented is unknown, but it was fewer than its World War II successor.

Among notable recipients of the Ehrenbecher für den Sieger im Luftkampf were:

- Oswald Boelcke – 24 December 1915; One of Germany's top aces of World War I; also received the Pour le Mérite.
- Otto Deßloch – award date unknown; later a Colonel General in the Luftwaffe; he also received the Knight's Cross of the Iron Cross with Oakleaves.
- Hermann Göring – 15 April 1916; later Reichsmarschall; received the Pour le Mérite, Baden's Military Karl-Friedrich Merit Order, Grand Cross of the Iron Cross and numerous other decorations.
- Georg Ritter von Hengl – 17 July 1918; knighted with the Bavarian Military Order of Max Joseph in October 1918; later became General of Mountain Troops and commanded the 2nd Mountain Division and XIX Mountain Corps.
- Max Immelmann – 24 December 1915; German World War I ace whose early exploits and fame led to the nickname for the Pour le Mérite as the "Blue Max"; also received the Knight's Cross and Commander's Cross of Saxony's Military Order of St. Henry.
- Bruno Loerzer – award date unknown; the 8th ranking German ace of World War I; also received the Pour le Mérite; later a Colonel General in the Luftwaffe.
- Theo Osterkamp – 18 April 1917; naval aviator and Pour le Mérite recipient; also flew in World War II and rose to Lieutenant General in the Luftwaffe.
- Manfred von Richthofen – award date unknown; top ace of World War I; also received the Pour le Mérite, Saxony's Military Order of St. Henry, Württemberg's Military Merit Order and numerous other decorations.
- Kurt Student – award date unknown; later a Colonel General in the Luftwaffe and commander of German airborne troops.
- Ernst Udet – 17 August 1916; second highest scoring German ace of World War I; also received the Pour le Mérite; later a Colonel General in the Luftwaffe.

The Imperial German Navy had its own aviation forces in World War I, and created its own non-portable award for victory in aerial combat. This was the Ehrenpreis für Vernichtung eines feindlichen Flugzeugs, or Honor Prize for the Destruction of an Enemy Aircraft. This was not a goblet, but a trophy of two eagles engaged in a mid-air fight.

There was also another, even more rare, Imperial German award, the Ehrenbecher für erfolgreiche Angriffe aus der Luft, or Honor Goblet for Successful Attacks from the Air. This was apparently only bestowed a very few times to members of bomber or Zeppelin crews for successful attacks.
