= John Robert Baldwin =

Royal Air Force fighter pilot

- Born: 16 July 1918; Bath, England
- Died: presumably 15 March 1952 (aged 33); Korea
- Military career
- Allegiance: United Kingdom
- Branch: Royal Air Force
- Service years: 1939–1952
- Rank: Wing Commander
- Service number: 122337
- Commands: No. 123 (Typhoon) Wing (1945); No. 146 (Typhoon) Wing (1944–45); No. 198 Squadron RAF (1943–44)
- Conflicts: Second World War; Korean War
- Awards: Distinguished Service Order & Bar; Distinguished Flying Cross & Bar; Air Force Cross; Croix de Guerre (Belgium); Grand Officer of the Order of Orange-Nassau (Netherlands); Distinguished Flying Cross (United States)

Wing Commander John Robert Baldwin, DSO & Bar, DFC & Bar, AFC (16 July 1918 – missing in action 15 March 1952) was a Royal Air Force fighter pilot and the top scoring fighter ace flying the Hawker Typhoon exclusively during the Second World War. He went missing during secondment service with the United States Air Force in the Korean War and was presumed killed.

== Career ==
The only son of Chambré Baldwin (1884–1969) and Grace Baldwin, John Baldwin was born in Bath. Beginning as ground crew with the RAFVR at the start of the Second World War, he served in France during 1940 and spent the 'Blitz' period on bomb disposal duties. Baldwin volunteered for aircrew in 1941 and trained as a pilot. Commissioned as a pilot officer in March 1942, he joined No. 609 Squadron RAF on 17 November 1942, flying the Hawker Typhoon.

His first success was damaging a Focke-Wulf Fw 190 in December 1942. On 20 January 1943 fighter-bombers from Jagdgeschwader 26 (JG 26) (fighter wing), supported by JG 2 attacked London in daylight with some 90 Messerschmitt Bf 109s and Fw 190s in three waves. No. 609 Squadron intercepted the second wave and claimed four Bf 109-Gs from 6 squadrons of JG 26. Three of these successes were by Baldwin. Postwar research indicates that these may have included Leutnant Wenzel, reported as missing, and Unteroffiziere Marquardt and Budde, who were both captured. Baldwin met the two captured pilots a few days later.

On 25 March he was shot down over the English Channel by a Fw 190. His victor may have been Feldwebel Wilhelm Freuwörth from JG 26. On 4 October 1943 he claimed one Me 109's of JG 2. On 16 October 1943, six Typhoons from 609 Squadron encountered several Ju 88s, three being claimed, with a half-share to Baldwin. From mid-October 1942 to June 1943 the squadron claimed some 27 of the 47 air victories claimed by Typhoons, making it the most successful Typhoon squadron.

Baldwin moved from No. 609 Squadron to command No. 198 Squadron RAF in November 1943. On 1 December he destroyed a Fw 190 and on 4 December a Dornier Do 217 bomber, his ninth victory. He was awarded a Bar to his DFC and destroyed three Fw 190s and a Caudron Goeland (utility passenger aircraft) during January 1944. His tour ended in April 1944, and he served with No 2 Group Operations staff. In June 1944 he was appointed to command No. 146 Wing RAF. On 29 June 1944, flying with 193 Squadron, he shot down two Bf 109's, and two weeks later on 3 July, flying with 197 Squadron, he destroyed another.

During operations following the invasion of north-west Europe, Baldwin was involved in a "friendly fire" incident. On 27 August 1944, his wing was requested by the Royal Navy to attack enemy vessels off Le Havre. Typhoons of No. 263 Squadron RAF and No. 266 Squadron RAF attacked the ships. Baldwin requested clarification, as the ships did not appear to be enemy, but he was told to press on. The ships turned out to be the Royal Navy's 1st Minesweeping Flotilla. In the course of the attack, HMS Britomart and HMS Hussar were sunk, while HMS Salamander had her stern blown off. The attacks cost 117 sailors killed and 153 wounded. The subsequent court of enquiry identified the fault as lying entirely with the Navy; the officer arranging the minesweeping had not informed others of the area of operations.

In February 1945 he assumed command of No. 123 Wing RAF. During the last days of the war in Europe, he was commanding the Wing in operations against enemy shipping in the Baltic Sea.

On 3 May 1945 squadrons of 83 Group were attacking enemy shipping, and No. 198, No. 184, No. 193, No. 263, and No. 197 squadrons attacked the passenger liners SS Cap Arcona and SS Deutschland and the freighter SS Thielbek, which were believed to be used by the Germans to escape. The ships had actually been used by the Germans to house prisoners, many from the concentration camp at Neuengamme. As a result of the attack over 7,000 died.

He was credited with 15 and 1 shared aerial victories destroyed, 4 damaged, and 5 damaged on the ground as well as many ground vehicles.

He was awarded a permanent commission in the RAF in October 1946. He then led a team of four pilots from the RAF Central Fighter Establishment on attachment to the USAF in Korea. He flew operationally with the 16th Fighter Interceptor Squadron of the 51st Fighter Interceptor Wing. He was posted missing, presumed killed, in March 1952 during the Korean War flying a North American F-86 Sabre.

He was profiled on the Nova programme Missing in MiG Alley.

== Honours and awards ==
- 23 February 1943 – Flying Officer John Robert Baldwin (122337) Royal Air Force Volunteer Reserve, No. 609 Squadron is awarded a Distinguished Flying Cross:

This officer has participated in numerous sorties, invariably displaying great courage and operational efficiency. This was amply demonstrated during a sortie one day in January, 1943, when he attacked a formation of three enemy aircraft. In his first attack, Flying Officer Baldwin shot down the leading aircraft of the hostile formation. Following this success he destroyed another of the formation before his own aircraft was hit in one of the wings. When the third enemy fighter attempted to attack from the rear, Flying Officer Baldwin out-manoeuvred the attacker and shot it down. On another occasion, during a sortie over Belgium, he damaged four locomotives.

— London Gazette

- 14 January 1944 – Bar to DFC;
  Squadron Leader Baldwin is a keen, skilful and determined fighter. He has participated in much operational flying during which he has destroyed at least nine enemy aircraft. In addition he has attacked some 14 locomotives, six barges, a tug and a tanker with damaging effect. He is a highly efficient squadron commander, whose example and determination has inspired all
  — London Gazette
- 10 March 1944 – Acting Squadron Leader John Robert Baldwin, DFC (12233), Royal Air Force Volunteer Reserve, No. 198 Squadron is awarded the Distinguished Service Order in recognition of gallantry displayed in flying operations against the enemy:

Since being awarded a Bar to the Distinguished Flying Cross, Squadron Leader Baldwin has led his squadron on very many sorties, during which 30 enemy aircraft have been shot down. Much of the great success achieved can be attributed to Squadron Leader Baldwin's superb leadership, fine tactical ability and iron determination. His sterling qualities were amply demonstrated in January, 1944, when he led an attack on a force of some 30 Focke-Wulf 190s, 9 of which were shot down, Squadron Leader Baldwin being responsible for 2 of the successes. His example was inspiring

— London Gazette

- 29 December 1944 – Acting Wing Commander John Robert Baldwin, DSO, DFC (122337) is awarded a bar to the Distinguished Service Order.
- 24 January 1947 – Wing Commander John Robert Baldwin, DSO, DFC (122337), Royal Air Force is allowed to wear the Croix de Guerre 1940 with Palm conferred by the Belgian Government in recognition of valuable services rendered in connection with the war.
- 31 October 1947 – Wing Commander John Robert Baldwin, DSO, DFC (122337), Royal Air Force is allowed to wear the decoration of a Grand Officer of the Order of Orange Nassau conferred by the Queen of the Netherlands in recognition of valuable services rendered in connection with the war.
- 1 January 1948 – Acting Wing Commander John Robert Baldwin, DSO, DFC (122337) is awarded the Air Force Cross
- 30 October 1953 – Squadron Leader John Robert Baldwin, DSO, DFC, AFC (122337) Royal Air Force (missing) is allowed to wear the Distinguished Flying Cross conferred by the President of the United States in recognition of valuable services rendered during operations in Korea.

== See also ==
- List of people who disappeared
