= John Villa =

British flying ace of WWII (1919–1983)

- Born: December 1919; South Kensington, London, United Kingdom
- Died: 9 March 1983 (aged 63); Ramsey, Isle of Man, United Kingdom
- Military career
- Allegiance: United Kingdom
- Branch: Royal Air Force
- Service years: 1937–1946
- Rank: Squadron Leader
- Nickname: 'Pancho'
- Commands: No. 65 Squadron; No. 501 Squadron; No. 198 Squadron
- Conflicts: Second World War: Battle of Britain
- Awards: Distinguished Flying Cross & Bar

John Villa, DFC & Bar (December 1919 – 9 March 1983) was a flying ace who served in the Royal Air Force (RAF) during the Second World War. During his service with the RAF, he was credited with having destroyed at least seventeen German aircraft.

Born in South Kensington, Villa joined the RAF in 1937. At the start of the Second World War, he was flying with No. 72 Squadron and claimed a number of aerial victories with this unit during the Battle of Britain. Awarded the Distinguished Flying Cross (DFC), he was posted to No. 92 Squadron for the final weeks of the battle, achieving more success and a Bar to his DFC. He spent a period of time during 1941 as an instructor before being given command of No. 65 Squadron which he led until the end of the year when he became ill. On recovery, he commanded a series of fighter squadrons until his health declined in May 1943, preventing any further operational flying for the remainder of the war. He left the RAF in 1946 and in the postwar period, worked for a number of civil airlines until the end of his flying career in 1982. He died on the Isle of Man, aged 63.

== Early life ==
John Wolferstan Villa was born at South Kensington in London, the United Kingdom, in December 1920. Once his education was completed, he joined the Royal Air Force (RAF) on a short service commission. Villa, who became well known in the RAF by his nickname 'Pancho', commenced his initial training in March 1937 before proceeding to No. 11 Flying Training School at Wittering as an acting pilot officer three months later. His first posting after completion of his flight training was to No. 2 Squadron, an army cooperation unit, in March 1938. By the time of the outbreak of the Second World War, he was serving with No. 72 Squadron.

== Second World War ==
Villa's new unit was a fighter squadron based at Leconfield, in Yorkshire, from where it operated Supermarine Spitfires on patrols covering shipping in the area. The squadron would subsequently move to Scotland later in the year. By this time Villa held the rank of flying officer, having been promoted on 26 October 1939. No. 72 Squadron moved to Acklington in March 1940, where it continued with shipping patrols. In early June it briefly operated from Gravesend, flying patrols over the beaches at Dunkirk from where the British Expeditionary Force was being evacuated. During this time, Villa shot down a Junkers Ju 87 dive bomber near Dunkirk on 2 June.

=== Battle of Britain ===
No. 72 Squadron was moved to Biggin Hill in late August, just as the Luftwaffe escalated its operations against southern England. Villa damaged a Messerschmitt Bf 109 fighter over Gatwick on 1 September and also claimed a second Bf 109 as probably destroyed. The next day he shot down a Messerschmitt Bf 110 heavy fighter near Herne Bay, damaged a second Bf 110, and probably destroyed a third Bf 110. On 4 September, flying near Tonbridge, he destroyed a Bf 110 and probably shot down a second. Villa shot down a Heinkel He 111 medium bomber near Rochester on 7 September, although this was deemed to be a probable. He shared in the destruction of a Dornier Do 17 medium bomber in the vicinity of East Grinstead on 10 September. A He 111 was destroyed by Villa and another pilot 20 miles (32 km) south of Eastbourne on 14 September.

On 15 September, what is now known as Battle of Britain Day, the Luftwaffe made a large scale attack on London. In the morning, Villa shot down a pair of Bf 109s near Dungeness. Later in the day he destroyed a Do 17 over Biggin Hill, and a He 111 near Dartford, the latter being shared with another pilot. Villa shot down a He 111 near Croydon on 27 September and the next day destroyed a Bf 109 to the north of Hastings. His successes over the previous several weeks was recognised with an award of a Distinguished Flying Cross (DFC) in early October. The published citation read:

Since 31st August, 1940, this officer has destroyed at least six enemy aircraft. One day in September, 1940, he was successful in destroying three enemy aircraft unaided and assisted in the destruction of a fourth. Flight Lieutenant Villa has consistently led his flight, and frequently the squadron, with great dash and eagerness, and has proved a keen fighter and a good leader.

— London Gazette, No. 34964, 8 October 1940

In the morning of 11 October, Villa was on a solo interception sortie when he destroyed a Do 17 over the Thames Estuary. This was his final claim with No. 72 Squadron; it was sent to Leconfield for a rest but Villa was posted to No. 92 Squadron to command one of its flights. This was another Spitfire unit that operated from Biggin Hill. On 20 October, Villa shared with several other pilots in the destruction of a Bf 110 to the east of Tonbridge. His Spitfire was damaged during the engagement and he had to make a forced landing in the stricken aircraft at Tonbridge. Five days later he shot down a Bf 109 to the south of Maidstone. The next day, 26 October, he was promoted to flight lieutenant. Villa destroyed a Bf 110 15 miles (24 km) to the south of Rye on 29 October. He shot down a Bf 109 over the Thames Estuary on 15 November. Later in the month, Villa was awarded a Bar to his DFC. The published citation read:

In October, 1940, this officer led his squadron in an attack against an enemy bombing formation attempting a raid on London, and immediately caused the enemy to jettison their bombs and form a defensive circle. He pressed home his attack with great determination and assisted in the destruction of two Messerschmitt 109s and possibly a further two. He has shown outstanding powers of leadership, skill and courage and has destroyed a total of 13 hostile aircraft.

— London Gazette, No. 35001, 26 November 1940

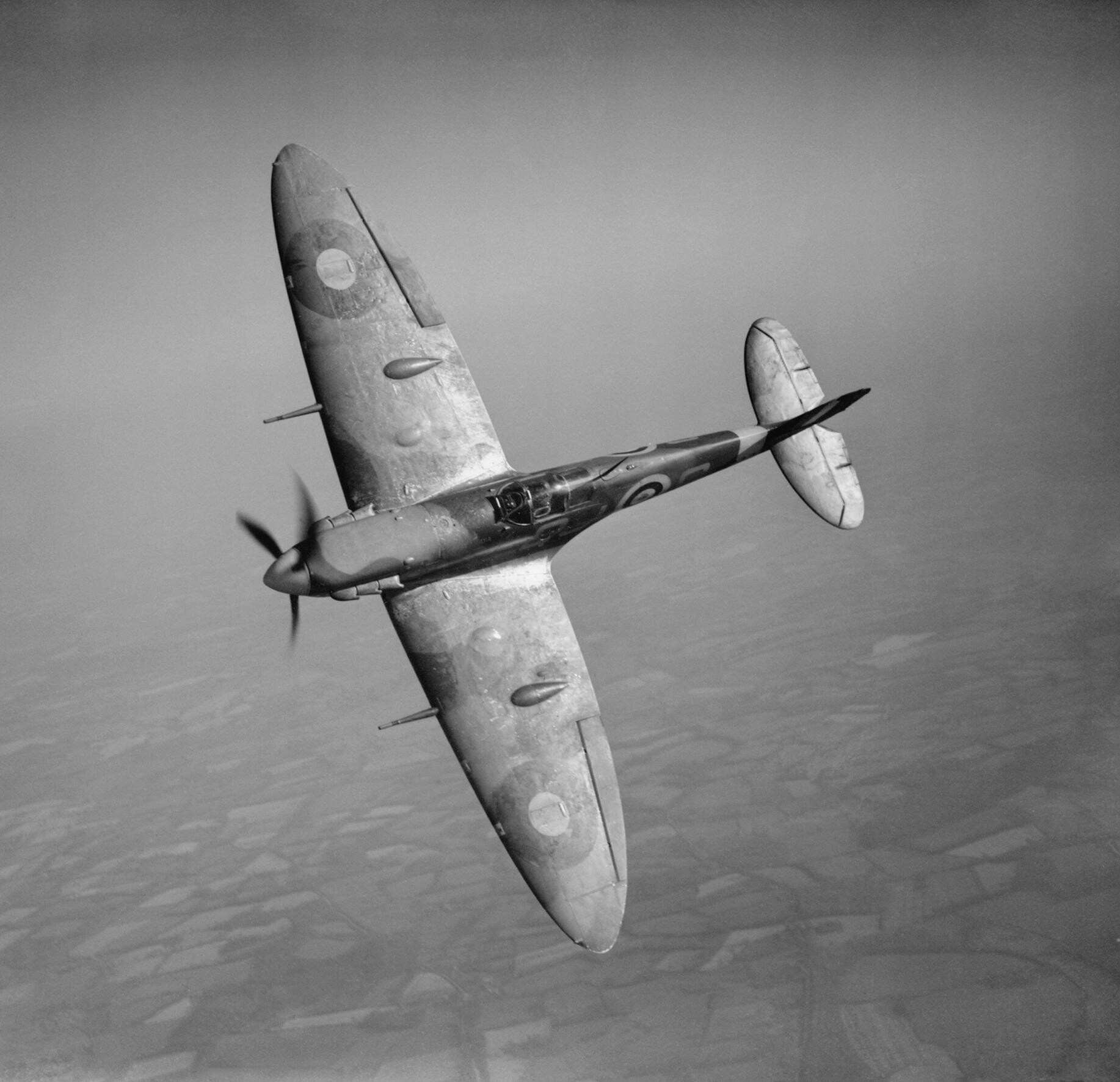
A Spitfire of No. 92 Squadron, 1941

While flying a Spitfire equipped with cannons on 1 December, Villa destroyed one Bf 109 and damaged a second. These were the first claims for a cannon-armed Spitfire operating from Biggin Hill. From February 1941, No. 92 Squadron switched to offensive operations, flying sorties to France.

=== Later war service ===
The following month, Villa was promoted to temporary squadron leader and was rested from operations. He carried out instructing duties at No. 58 Operational Training Unit (OTU) at Grangemouth, and later in the year was appointed Chief Flying Instructor at No. 61 OTU at Rednal. He returned to operations in early August 1941 as commander of No. 65 Squadron. This was equipped with Spitfires and, based at Kirton-in-Lindsey, was engaged in Fighter Command's Circus offensive against German-occupied Europe. On a sortie to the Netherlands on 12 August, Villa damaged a Bf 109 inland of Haamstede. At the end of the year, Villa became ill and relinquished command of the squadron.

In mid-1942, Villa, now recovered, was given command of No. 501 Squadron. Flying Spitfires from Ibsley, as part of No. 10 Group, its main role at the time was escorting bombers. Soon after Villa's arrival, it moved to Middle Wallop although its duties remained unchanged. Villa remained in command until September. In December, he was appointed commander of the newly formed No. 198 Squadron. This was tasked with a ground attack role, and its initial aircraft complement included Hawker Hurricane fighters as well as the new Hawker Typhoon fighter. By early 1943 it was operational, flying from Acklington and Manston, and in April carried out its first ground attack sortie. Villa was becoming increasingly affected with sinus problems and in May was taken off operations. He did not fly operationally for the remainder of the war and left the RAF in 1946, still in the rank of squadron leader.

== Later life ==
With his military career at an end Villa worked in the civil aviation sector, initially flying for Eagle Aviation. He piloted a Handley Page Halifax transport aircraft into Berlin as part of the airlift to provide supplies during the blockade of the city from mid-1948 to mid-1949. He subsequently flew for the Skyways airline, operating a variety of passenger aircraft. He later worked for Trans Mediterranean Airways in the Middle East flying Boeing 707 airliners. He ceased flying towards the end of 1982 and died on 9 March the following year at Ramsey on the Isle of Man.

Villa is credited with the destruction of at least seventeen German aircraft, four of which shared with other pilots, with another four probably destroyed. Additionally, he damaged four aircraft.
