= RAF Thorney Island =

Former Royal Air Force station in West Sussex, England

RAF Thorney Island
- Thorney Island, West Sussex in England
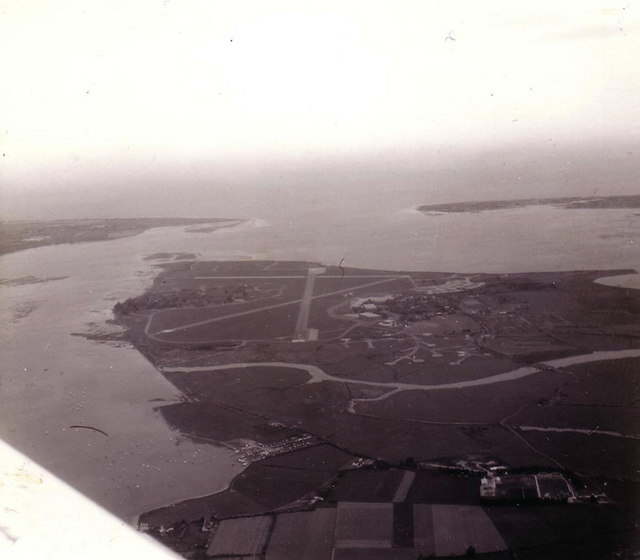

Site information
- Type: Royal Air Force station
- Code: TC
- Owner: Ministry of Defence
- Operator: Royal Air Force
- Controlled by: RAF Coastal Command; 1938-44 * No. 16 Group RAF; Second Tactical Air Force; 1944- * No. 2 Group RAF * No. 84 Group RAF

Location
- Shown within West Sussex
- Coordinates: 50°49′01″N 000°55′15″W

Site history
- Built: 1937/38
- In use: February 1938 - 1984
- Battles/wars: European theatre of World War II; Cold War

Airfield information
- Elevation: 0 feet (0 m) AMSL
Runways
Direction	Length and surface
01/19	Concrete
06/24	Concrete
12/30	Concrete

Royal Air Force Thorney Island, or more simply RAF Thorney Island, is a former Royal Air Force station located on Thorney Island, West Sussex, England, 6.6 miles (10.6 km) west of Chichester and 7.1 miles (11.4 km) east of Portsmouth, Hampshire. The site is now used by the Army as Baker Barracks.

== Station history ==
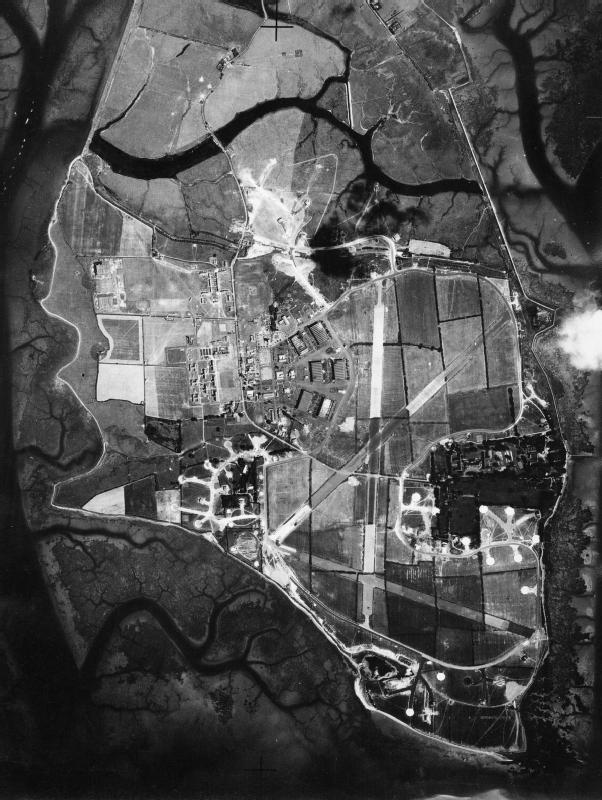
Aerial view in World War II

The airfield was built in 1938 for fighter aircraft. The airfield was involved in the Battle of Britain when it was attacked by the Luftwaffe on Sunday 18 August 1940 (The Hardest Day), the same date as other stations such as RAF Ford and RAF Poling Radio Direction Finding (RDF) Chain Home station.

RAF Thorney Island was transferred to RAF Coastal Command for the protection of shipping and other various roles, and had its concrete runways laid in 1942. The station closed as an RAF airfield on 31 March 1976; however, the Royal Artillery reopened the site in 1982.

== Operational history ==
=== Major units ===
As with many RAF Coastal Command airfields, a great variety of squadrons and aircraft were posted to RAF Thorney Island during World War II in particular:

No. 22 Squadron RAF moved to the airfield on 10 March 1938 firstly using Vickers Vildebeest and then the Bristol Beaufort. It was possibly during this time when Flying Officer Kenneth Campbell won his Victoria Cross for a daring attack on the German battleship Gneisenau which was located in Brest harbour during April 1941, which took his life. The squadron left on 8 April 1940 then came back to the airfield again on 25 June 1941 and stayed until 28 October 1941.

No. 48 Squadron RAF was present between 28 September 1938 and 10 October 1938 before returning on 25 August 1939 and leaving for the last time on 16 July 1940, both times using the Avro Anson.

No. 53 Squadron RAF was operating the Hawker Hector from the airfield firstly between 24 November 1940 and 20 March 1941 before re-turning on 29 April 1943 staying until 25 September 1943 using the Consolidated Liberator.

No. 59 Squadron RAF moved in to Thorney island on 3 July 1940, initially flying anti-submarine patrols and bombing raids against the German invasion ports with Bristol Blenheims but left on 23 June 1941. The squadron returned 22 July 1941 and later became a general reconnaissance squadron, carrying out anti-shipping strikes, first with the Blenheims and then with Lockheed Hudsons then left on 17 January 1942. In August 1942 the squadron returned and converted to the Consolidated Liberator then for two months operated the Flying Fortress before reverting to the Liberator until it left Thorney in February 1943.

No. 86 Squadron RAF used RAF Thorney Island for two separate occasions. Firstly when it arrived during January 1942 using the Bristol Beaufort Mk I as a detachment before moving to RAF North Coates during March then again during August 1942 until March 1943 flying the Consolidated Liberator Mk IIIa.

No. 164 (Argentine–British) Squadron RAF used RAF Thorney Island as an airfield sometime between 16 March 1944 and 12 April 1944 conducting operations against enemy shipping and coastal using the Hawker Typhoon IB. However they returned nine days later and then stayed until 8 June 1944.

No. 198 Squadron RAF moved to the airfield on 6 April 1944 using the Hawker Typhoon IB for the preparation for D-Day before moving on 22 April 1944. The squadron returned 8 days later on 30 April 1944 was heavily used around Caen during the Battle for Caen before moving to France on 18 June 1944.

No. 233 Squadron RAF used the airfield as a location for a detachment starting from 2 January 1942 while the rest of the squadron were based at RAF Gibraltar before finally joining them on 12 July 1942.

No. 236 Squadron RAF was operational during the Battle of Britain as on 4 July 1940 it moved to the airfield using Bristol Blenheims carrying out anti-shipping patrols. The squadron changed aircraft in October 1941 to Bristol Beaufighters before moving to RAF Wattisham in February 1942.

No. 280 Squadron RAF formed at the airfield on 12 December 1941 as an Air Sea Rescue unit but did not receive any aircraft until February 1942 when Avro Ansons arrived but the squadron left on 10 February 1942. The squadron returned on 25 September 1943 and stayed until 21 October 1943.

No. 404 Squadron RCAF formed at RAF Thorney Island on 15 April 1941 conducting coastal patrols flying the Bristol Blenheim Mk.IV, Bristol Beaufighter and the de Havilland Mosquito Mk.VI before moving to RAF Davidstow Moor on 20 June 1941.

No. 407 Coastal Strike Squadron (RCAF) was formed at Thorney Island on 8 May 1941, first training on the Bristol Blenheim. From September 1941 to January 1943, the squadron operated as a "strike" squadron attacking enemy shipping with the Lockheed Hudson. On 29 January 1943 it was re-designated 407 General Reconnaissance Squadron, and for the remainder of the war it protected friendly shipping from the U-boat threat operating the Vickers Wellington. The squadron was disbanded at the end of the Second World War on 4 June 1945.

No. 415 Squadron RCAF formed at the airfield on 20 August 1941 using Handley Page Hampdens as a torpedo-bomber squadron attacking enemy convoys and shipyards until 11 April 1942. Before returning on 16 May 1942 until 5 June 1942 and a third and final time between 11 November 1942 and 15 November 1943.

The next unit to use the airfield was No. 547 Squadron RAF which arrived 25 October 1943 with Liberators which it operated over the Bay of Biscay. The squadron moved again on 14 January 1944 to RAF Leuchars.

No. 612 (County of Aberdeen) Squadron AAF operated at the airfield between 18 August 1942 and 23 September 1942 with detachments at RAF Wick and RAF St Eval before moving to RAF Wick. The squadron flew both Armstrong Whitworth Whitleys and Vickers Wellingtons during the war.

=== Minor units ===
+ data from

Squadron	Starting from	Ending on	Aircraft	Notes
No. 21 Squadron RAF	18 June 1944	6 February 1945	de Havilland Mosquito VI	Used the airfield for just over six months
No. 129 (Mysore) Squadron RAF	30 July 1942	25 September 1942	Supermarine Spitfire	Used the airfield for just two months
No. 130 (Punjab) Squadron RAF	16 August 1942	20 August 1942	Supermarine Spitfire VA	Used the airfield for four days
No. 131 (County of Kent) Squadron RAF	24 September 1942	7 November 1942	Supermarine Spitfire IIA	Used the airfield for just under two weeks
No. 143 Squadron RAF	11 June 1942	27 July 1942	Hawker Hurricane	Used the airfield for just over six weeks
No. 183 (Gold Coast) Squadron RAF	1 April 1944	11 April 1944	Hawker Typhoon IB	First deployment to airfield
No. 183 Squadron RAF	22 April 1944	18 June 1944	Hawker Typhoon IB	Second deployment to airfield
No. 193 (Fellowship of the Bellows) Squadron RAF	16 March 1944	6 April 1944	Hawker Typhoon IB	Used the airfield for three weeks
No. 217 Squadron RAF	29 October 1941	6 March 1942	Bristol Beaufort II	Moved to RAF Leuchars
No. 220 Squadron RAF	October 1943	June 1945	Boeing Fortress II A	Detachment from another airfield
No. 235 Squadron RAF	10 June 1940	24 June 1940	Bristol Blenheim	Used the airfield for fourteen days
No. 278 Squadron RAF	15 February 1945	15 October 1945	Supermarine Walrus; Supermarine Sea Otter	
No. 455 Squadron RAAF	14 April 1944	20 October 1944	Bristol Beaufighter X	Detachment from RAF Langham in Norfolk
No. 464 Squadron RAAF	18 June 1944	7 February 1945	de Havilland Mosquito FB VI	Moved to B.87 in France
No. 487 Squadron RNZAF	18 June 1944	2 February 1945	de Havilland Mosquito FB VI	A detachment moved to B.87 in France in December 1944
No. 609 (West Riding) Squadron AAF	1 April 1944	22 April 1944	Hawker Typhoon	First deployment to airfield
No. 609 (West Riding) Squadron AAF	30 April 1944	18 June 1944	Hawker Typhoon	Second deployment to airfield

=== Fleet Air Arm Squadrons ===
The airfield was also used by squadrons of the Fleet Air Arm for instance, in April 1945 703 Naval Air Squadron (NAS) was reformed as the "Air Sea Warfare Development Unit" at RAF Thorney Island to conduct experimental trials on a large variety of aircraft including the Grumman Avenger, Fairey Barracuda, Fairey Firefly and de Havilland Sea Mosquito. also two other Fleet Air Arm squadrons used the airfield with 810 NAS joining during March 1945 flying the Fairey Barracuda III and 836 NAS from January 1943 until March 1943 flying the Fairey Swordfish before moving to RAF Machrihanish.

Several other Naval Air Squadrons also used the airfield:

- 704 NAS flying the de Havilland Sea Mosquito between June 1945 and July 1945.
- 816 NAS flew the Fairey Swordfish between September 1942 and December 1942.
- 819 NAS using the Fairey Swordfish arriving during the winter of 1942.
- 822 NAS flew the Fairey Barracuda arriving January 1945.
- 833 NAS used the Fairey Swordfish and arrived during 1943.
- 838 NAS flying the Fairey Swordfish between November 1944 and January 1945.
- 842 NAS flew the Fairey Swordfish between November 1944 and January 1945.
- 848 NAS used the Grumman Avenger between 6 June 1944 and July 1944.
- 854 NAS flying the Grumman Avenger between 7 August 1944 and late August of the same year.
- 855 NAS used the Grumman Avenger between 7 August 1944 and late August 1944

== Postwar units ==
On 1 October 1946 254 Squadron at RAF Thorney Island was renumbered to No. 42 Squadron. Equipped with Bristol Beaufighter TF.10, it was a strike unit in RAF Coastal Command until disbanded on 15 October 1947.

=== 242 Operational Conversion Unit ===
No 242 OCU, was posted to RAF Dishforth, received its Blackburn Beverley Flight in 1957. The OCU's instructors trained aircrew and ground staff in the flying and maintenance of the aircraft. In 1961, the unit moved to RAF Thorney Island, but the Beverley flight was disbanded in March 1967. A mistake in embroidery work resulted in a batch of Squadron badges bearing the title '242 Operational Conversation Unit'.

The first Lockheed C-130 Hercules was delivered on 7 April 1967 by a Royal Air Force crew from the United States of America and shared the airfield with the Armstrong Whitworth AW.660 Argosy and later the Hawker Siddeley Andover C.1 which was operated by No. 84 Squadron RAF and No. 46 Squadron RAF

=== SAR flight 22 Squadron RAF ===
From June 1955, a Search and Rescue flight of No. 22 Squadron RAF equipped with Westland Whirlwind helicopters were posted to Thorney Island. These remained at the airfield until the Royal Air Force left in 1976. B Flight No 22 Squadron was re-allocated to RAF Lossiemouth in 1973, when it became a Flight of No. 202 Squadron. RNAS Lee-on-Solent took over the area SAR capability.

== Post RAF ==
Subsequently, the Royal Navy expressed an interest in utilising the base, but in 1980 West Thorney became host to many hundreds of Vietnamese refugee families, accepted by the United Kingdom for resettlement. In 1984 control was handed to the Royal Artillery, who named the site Baker Barracks, and who remain in control of the airfield to date.

== Units ==
The following units were also here at some point:

- No. 1 Coastal Artillery Co-operation Unit RAF
- No. 1 Torpedo Training Unit RAF
- No. 2 Air Navigation School RAF
- No. 2 Armament Practice Camp RAF
- 2nd Tactical Air Force Communication Flight RAF
- No. 3 General Reconnaissance Unit RAF
- No. 8 Anti-Aircraft Co-operation Unit RAF
- No. 20 Air Crew Holding Unit RAF
- No. 20 (Fighter) Sector RAF
- No. 20 (Fighter) Wing RAF
- No. 21 Air Crew Holding Unit RAF
- No. 24 Air Crew Holding Unit RAF
- No. 83 Group Communication Squadron RAF
- No. 83 Group Support Unit RAF
- No. 92 (Forward) Staging Post
- No. 123 Airfield Headquarters RAF became No. 123 (Rocket Projectile) Wing RAF
- No. 136 Airfield Headquarters RAF became No. 136 (Fighter) Wing RAF
- No. 140 (Bomber) Wing RAF
- No. 161 Gliding School RAF
- No. 413 (Polish) Repair & Salvage Unit
- No. 431 Flight RAF
- No. 1112 Marine Craft Unit
- No. 1317 Mobile Wing RAF Regiment
- No. 1426 (Enemy Aircraft Circus) Flight RAF
- No. 2724 Squadron RAF Regiment
- No. 2760 Squadron RAF Regiment
- No. 2772 Squadron RAF Regiment
- No. 2773 Squadron RAF Regiment
- No. 2821 Squadron RAF Regiment
- No. 2848 Squadron RAF Regiment
- No. 3206 Servicing Commando
- Air-Sea Warfare Development Unit RAF
- Aircraft Torpedo Development Unit RAF
- Andover Operational Conversion Unit RAF
- Coastal Command Fighter Circus (Section) RAF
- Engine Control Instructional Flight RAF
- School of General Reconnaissance RAF
- Survival and Rescue Training Unit RAF
