= Wilhelm Freuwörth =

German World War II flying ace (1917–1970)

- Born: 4 November 1917; Börßum
- Died: 5 December 1970 (aged 53); Wetzlar
- Military career
- Allegiance: Nazi Germany
- Branch: Luftwaffe
- Rank: Oberleutnant (first lieutenant)
- Nickname: "Willi"
- Units: JG 52; JG 26
- Conflicts: World War II: Eastern Front; Defence of the Reich
- Awards: Knight's Cross of the Iron Cross

Wilhelm "Willi" Freuwörth (4 November 1917 – 5 December 1970) was a Luftwaffe ace and recipient of the Knight's Cross of the Iron Cross during World War II. The Knight's Cross of the Iron Cross, and its variants were the highest awards in the military and paramilitary forces of Nazi Germany during World War II. During his career Freuwörth was credited with 58 aerial victories.

== Early life and career ==
Freuwörth was born on 4 November 1917 in Börßum in the Province of Saxony within the German Empire. He joined the Luftwaffe in early 1940 and following flight and fighter pilot training, (Note: Flight training in the Luftwaffe progressed through the levels A1, A2 and B1, B2, referred to as A/B flight training. A training included theoretical and practical training in aerobatics, navigation, long-distance flights and dead-stick landings. The B courses included high-altitude flights, instrument flights, night landings and training to handle the aircraft in difficult situations.) Trenkel was posted to 3. Staffel (3rd squadron) of Jagdgeschwader 52 (JG 52—52nd Fighter Wing) in April 1941. In late April, 3. Staffel was commanded by Oberleutnant Helmut Bennemann and based at Esbjerg. The Staffel was subordinated to I. Gruppe (1st group) of JG 52 headed by Oberleutnant Karl-Heinz Leesmann. The Gruppe was tasked with patrolling the Dutch coast area and German Bight, the three Staffeln were then deployed at various airfields on the Dutch, German and Danish North Sea coast.

== World War II ==
On Friday 1 September 1939 German forces had invaded Poland which marked the beginning of World War II. On 7 July 1941, the Gruppenstab (headquarters unit) and 3. Staffel moved to an airfield on Wangerooge. Here on 26 August, Freuwörth claimed his first aerial victory when he shot down the Royal Air Force (RAF) Bristol Blenheim Z7277 from No. 82 Squadron bomber north of Juist. This earned him the Iron Cross 2nd Class (Eisernes Kreuz zweiter Klasse). On 23 September, I. Gruppe was withdrawn from the Western Front and was sent to the Eastern Front. With stopovers at Dortmund, Magdeburg, and Warsaw, the Gruppe arrived in Orsha on 29 September.

=== War against the Soviet Union ===
On 22 June, German forces had launched Operation Barbarossa, the invasion of the Soviet Union. Prior to its deployment on the Eastern Front, I. Gruppe was fully equipped with the Messerschmitt Bf 109 F-2. The Gruppe reached Orsha on 27 September before heading to Ponyatovka on 2 October. There, the Gruppe was initially subordinated to the Stab (headquarters unit) of Jagdgeschwader 27 (JG 27—27th Fighter Wing) and supported German forces fighting in the Battle of Vyazma as part of Operation Typhoon, the code name of the German offensive on Moscow. On a transfer flight, Freuwörth belly landed his Bf 109 F-2 at Smolensk on 4 October. On 20 October, the Gruppe moved to an airfield named Kalinin-Southwest, present-day Tver, and located on the Volga, and to Staritsa on 31 October and then to Ruza located approximately 80 kilometers (50 miles) west of Moscow on 3 November. Here on 26 November, Freuwörth claimed his first aerial victory on the Eastern Front when he shot down an Ilyushin Il-2 ground-attack aircraft. Two days later, he claimed a Mikoyan-Gurevich MiG-3 fighter shot down west of Mytishchi.

I./JG 52 insignia

The failed assault on Moscow forced I. Gruppe to retreat to an airfield at Dugino, present-day Novodugino, on 15 December where they stayed until 31 January 1942. Here on 9 January, Freuwörth, flying Bf 109 F-2 (Werknummer 5680—factory number), was involved in a mid-air collision with another Bf 109 during the landing approach at Dugino. In the accident, Leutnant Joachim Riedel was killed while Freuwörth escaped unharmed. the On 1 February 1942, I. Gruppe was withdrawn from combat operations and was moved to Smolensk and then further west to Orsha. From 8 to 12 February the Gruppe took a train to Jesau near Königsberg, present-day Kaliningrad in Russia, for a period of recuperation and replenishment where they received new Bf 109 F-4 aircraft. The Gruppe was ordered to Olmütz, present-day Olomouc in Czech Republic, on 11 April. On 17 May, I. Gruppe relocated to Artyomovsk, present-day Bakhmut. From Artyomovsk, JG 52 supported the German forces fighting in the Second Battle of Kharkov. On 24 May, the Gruppe was ordered to relocate to Barvinkove located approximately 40 kilometers (25 miles) west of Sloviansk. On 29 May, Freuwörth was shot down in his Bf 109 F-4 during aerial combat with I-61 fighters, an early German designation of the MiG-3 fighter.

On 1 June, the Gruppe then moved to an airfield at Grakowo, located approximately halfway between Kharkov and Kupiansk. On 14 June, Bennemann replaced Leesmann, who was transferred, as Gruppenkommandeur (group commander) of I. Gruppe of JG 52. In consequence, command of 3. Staffel was passed on to Leutnant Karl Rüttger. Here, Freuwörth claimed two aerial victories, a Polikarpov I-16 fighter and a Lavochkin-Gorbunov-Gudkov LaGG-3 fighter two days later. On 26 June, the Gruppe moved to an airfield at Bilyi Kolodyaz, approximately 10 kilometers (6.2 miles) southeast of Vovchansk. Two days later, German forces had launched Case Blue, the strategic summer offensive in southern Russia. On 2 July, Rüttger became a prisoner of war and command of 3. Staffel transferred to Oberleutnant Rudolf Miethig. On 2 August 1942, I. Gruppe was ordered to Kerch on the Kerch Peninsula. At the time, the Gruppe was moved around as a kind of fire brigade, deployed in areas where the Soviet Air Forces was particular active. Here, Freuwörth claimed four aerial victories, taking his total to 14. The Gruppe then moved to Oryol on 15 August. Here, Freuwörth claimed two aerial victories on 22 August, a Polikarpov R-5 and a LaGG-3.

On 22 September, I. Gruppe moved to Pitomnik Airfield, supporting German forces fighting in the Battle of Stalingrad. By the end of September, Freuwörth had increased his number of aerial victories claimed to 32, making him the fourth most successful active fighter pilot of I. Gruppe at the time. On 6 December, the Gruppe moved to an airfield at Rossosh. Here on 16 December, Freuwörth became an "ace-in-a-day" when he claimed six Il-2 ground-attack aircraft shot down. Together with Hauptmann Johannes Wiese, Freuwörth was awarded the Knight's Cross of the Iron Cross (Ritterkreuz des Eisernen Kreuzes) on 5 January 1943 following their 51st and 56th aerial victories respectively.

=== With Jagdgeschwader 26 on the Western Front ===
On 28 February 1943, Freuwörth was transferred to 5. Staffel of Jagdgeschwader 26 "Schlageter" (JG 26—26th Fighter Wing). Equipped with the Focke-Wulf Fw 190 A-4, his squadron was part of II. Gruppe of JG 26 and at the time under the command of Major Wilhelm-Ferdinand Galland and based at Vitry-En-Artois Airfield in northern France.

He claimed his first aerial victory with JG 26 on 24 March when Freuwörth and his wingman Unteroffizier Peter Crump intercepted two Supermarine Spitfire fighters from No. 91 Squadron. Both Spitfires were claimed shot down. Freuwörth hit the Spitfire piloted by Flying Officer Jim Anstie, resulting in a forced landing near RAF Lympne. The following day, Freuwörth claimed another Spitfire fighter shot down 5 kilometers (3.1 miles) southeast of Dover. According to Mathews and Foreman, the aircraft he shot down was a misidentified Hawker Typhoon fighter from the No. 609 Squadron piloted by John Robert Baldwin who was shot down over the English Channel that day.

Om 24 October, Martin B-26 Marauder bombers flew three missions against targets in northern France. At noon, II. Gruppe was scrambled to intercept the bombers heading for Amiens. In this encounter, Freuwörth was shot down in his Fw 190 A-6 (Werknummer 530733) south of Montidier. Although he managed to bail out, he was seriously wounded. His victors were Spitfires from the Royal Norwegian Air Force No. 331 or No. 332 Squadron. The United States Army Air Forces Ninth Air Force and the RAF Second Tactical Air Force attacked various targets in France on 21 December. Following aerial combat, Freutwörth made a forced landing at Saint-Omer-Arques airfield. His Fw 190 A-6 overturned on the soft ground. His injuries were so severe that he could no longer fly combat missions. Following a period of convalescence, he served the rest of the war as a flight instructor with various training units. On 1 January 1945, Freuwörth was promoted to Oberleutnant (first lieutenant).

== Later life ==
Freuwörth died on 5 December 1970 at the age of 53 in Wetzlar, West Germany.

== Summary of career ==
=== Aerial victory claims ===
According to US historian David T. Zabecki, Freuwörth was credited with 58 aerial victories. Mathews and Foreman, authors of Luftwaffe Aces — Biographies and Victory Claims, researched the German Federal Archives and found records for 48 aerial victory claims. This figure includes 45 aerial victories on the Eastern Front and three over the Western Allies.

Victory claims were logged to a map-reference (PQ = Planquadrat), for example "PQ 40412". The Luftwaffe grid map (Jägermeldenetz) covered all of Europe, western Russia and North Africa and was composed of rectangles measuring 15 minutes of latitude by 30 minutes of longitude, an area of about 360 square miles (930 km^{2}). These sectors were then subdivided into 36 smaller units to give a location area 3 km × 4 km (1.9 mi × 2.5 mi) in size.

Chronicle of aerial victories
This and the ♠ (Ace of spades) indicates those aerial victories which made Freuwörth an "ace-in-a-day", a term which designates a fighter pilot who has shot down five or more airplanes in a single day. This and the ? (question mark) indicates information discrepancies listed by Prien, Stemmer, Rodeike, Bock, Mathews and Foreman.
Claim	Date	Time	Type	Location	Claim	Date	Time	Type	Location
– 3. Staffel of Jagdgeschwader 52 – On the Western Front — April – 23 September 1941
1	26 August 1941	14:20? (Note: According to Mathews and Foreman claimed at 14:27.)	Blenheim	north of Juist					
– 3. Staffel of Jagdgeschwader 52 – Operation Barbarossa — 2 October – 5 December 1941
2	26 November 1941	14:06	Il-2		3	28 November 1941	14:45	I-61 (MiG-3)	west of Mytishchi
– 3. Staffel of Jagdgeschwader 52 – 19 May 1942 – 1 February 1943
4	24 May 1942	18:22	Il-2		31	25 September 1942	10:40	LaGG-3	PQ 40412
5	26 May 1942	15:43	Pe-2		32? (Note: This claim is not listed by Mathews and Foreman.)	25 September 1942	—	LaGG-3	
6	28 May 1942	09:53	I-26 (Yak-1)		33	4 October 1942	14:58	Il-2	PQ 59321
7	11 June 1942	05:24	I-16		34	11 October 1942	12:03	LaGG-3	PQ 49432; Srednyaya Akhtuba
8	13 June 1942	06:36	LaGG-3	PQ 70213	35	14 October 1942	08:05	U-2	PQ 40563; 55 km (34 mi) north of Hrebinka
9	2 July 1942	09:32	LaGG-3		36	25 October 1942	14:40	Yak-1	PQ 49214 northeast of Hrebinka
10	31 July 1942	04:52	LaGG-3	PQ 97471	37	27 October 1942	09:08	R-5	PQ 59534 vicinity of Jarsew
11	2 August 1942	18:30	I-153	PQ 66664 east of Zaporizhzhia	38	28 October 1942	11:52	Yak-1	PQ 49431; Srednyaya Akhtuba
12	6 August 1942	09:15	R-5	PQ 75161 east of Anapa	39	29 October 1942	08:23	Yak-1	PQ 59321
13	6 August 1942	17:20	Pe-2	PQ 75161 east of Anapa	40	29 October 1942	14:50	LaGG-3	PQ 50593
14	10 August 1942	11:30	I-16	PQ 75413 vicinity of Vasilyevka	41	31 October 1942	12:52	LaGG-3	PQ 59333
15	22 August 1942	08:05	R-5	PQ 55764; Black Sea	42	1 November 1942	12:56	LaGG-3	PQ 49431 vicinity of Srednyaya Akhtuba
16	22 August 1942	08:08	LaGG-3	PQ 55884; Black Sea	43	1 November 1942	12:59? (Note: According to Mathews and Foreman claimed at 12:58.)	LaGG-3	PQ 49431 vicinity of Srednyaya Akhtuba
17	26 August 1942	06:22	I-180 (Yak-7)	PQ 47852 east-southeast of Zubtsov	44	1 November 1942	13:03	LaGG-3	PQ 59143
18	31 August 1942	11:08	Yak-1	PQ 47881	45	1 November 1942	13:06	LaGG-3	PQ 59123
19	31 August 1942	11:10	Yak-1	PQ 47841	46	2 November 1942	10:35	R-5	PQ 59193
20	2 September 1942	13:20	R-5	PQ 56452; Black Sea	47	3 November 1942	14:03? (Note: According to Mathews and Foreman claimed at 14:30.)	Il-2	PQ 50751
21	2 September 1942	16:39	LaGG-3	PQ 56414, Garetewo	48?	29 November 1942	—	R-5	
22	3 September 1942	14:35	Il-2	PQ 46253	49♠	16 December 1942	—	Il-2	
23	3 September 1942	14:36	Il-2	PQ 46262	50♠	16 December 1942	—	Il-2	
24	4 September 1942	17:30	Pe-2	PQ 46293	51♠	16 December 1942	—	Il-2	
25	5 September 1942	12:05	LaGG-3	PQ 57894	52♠	16 December 1942	—	Il-2	
26	5 September 1942	12:07	LaGG-3	PQ 57893; Sea of Azov	53♠	16 December 1942	—	Il-2	
27	6 September 1942	10:01	R-5	PQ 49814	54♠	16 December 1942	—	Il-2	
28	11 September 1942	16:17	P-39	PQ 47852	55?	17 December 1942	—	Il-2	
29	14 September 1942	07:50	U-2 (Seversky)	PQ 49824	56?	17 December 1942	—	Il-2	
30	16 September 1942	09:53	R-5	PQ 47361					
– 5. Staffel of Jagdgeschwader 26 "Schlageter" – On the Western Front — 1 February – 21 December 1943
57	24 March 1943	10:17	Spitfire	8 km (5.0 mi) east of Dungeness	58	25 March 1943	18:14	Spitfire	5 km (3.1 mi) southeast of Dover

=== Awards ===
- Iron Cross (1939) 2nd and 1st Class
- Honor Goblet of the Luftwaffe on 19 October 1942 as Unteroffizier and pilot (Note: According to Obermaier on 6 July 1942.)
- German Cross in Gold on 17 November 1942 as Unteroffizier in the I./Jagdgeschwader 52
- Knight's Cross of the Iron Cross on 5 January 1943 as Feldwebel and pilot in the 2./Jagdgeschwader 52
