= No. 123 Wing RAF =

No. 123 Wing RAF No. 123 Airfield Headquarters RAF No. 123 (Rocket Projectile) Wing RAF
- Active: 1943-44; 1944
- Country: United Kingdom
- Branch: Royal Air Force
- Type: Wing
- Last base: RAF Wunstorf

No. 123 Wing RAF is a former Royal Air Force wing that was operational during the Second World War.

== Second World War ==
No. 123 (Rocket Projectile) Wing RAF was formed on 12 May 1944 under No. 83 Group RAF, RAF Second Tactical Air Force at RAF Thorney Island, moving to RAF Funtington on 17 June 1944 then across the Channel to France and B.10 Plumelot on 1 July 1944. It moved to B.7 Martragny, B.67 Ursel, B.77 Gilze-Rijen, A.84 Chievres, B.77 Gilze-Rijen, B.91 Kluis, B.103 Plantlunne, B.116 Wunstorf, B.155 Dedelstorf and RAF Wunstorf. By January 1945 the wing was transferred to No. 84 Group RAF. It was disbanded at Wunstorf during October 1947.

Squadrons controlled:

- No. 198 Squadron RAF (12 May 1944 to ?)
- No. 609 (West Riding) Squadron RAuxAF (12 May 1944 to ?)
- No. 164 (Argentine–British) Squadron RAF (26 July 1944 to ?)
- No. 183 (Gold Coast) Squadron RAF (26 July 1944 to ?)
- No. 451 Squadron RAAF (17 June 1945 to 14 September 1945)
- No. 453 Squadron RAAF (17 June 1945 to 4 September 1945)
- No. 349 (Belgian) Squadron RAF (29 June 1945 to 15 November 1945)
- No. 322 (Dutch) Squadron RAF (2 July 1945 to 7 October 1945)
- No. 350 (Belgian) Squadron RAF (13 July 1945 to 15 November 1945)
- No. 3 Squadron RAF (24 January 1946 to ?)
- No. 41 Squadron RAF (31 January 1946 to 1 April 1946) became No. 26 (South African) Squadron RAF (1 April 1946 to 13 April 1946)
- No. 80 Squadron RAF (31 January 1946 to ?)
- No. 2 Squadron RAF (15 April 1947 to ?)

== Cold War ==
The wing was reformed on 1 April 1953 within No. 2 Group RAF at Wunstorf controlling local units. It was disbanded on 16 November 1957.

Squadrons controlled:

- No. 5 Squadron RAF (1 April 1953 to 12 October 1957)
- No. 11 Squadron RAF (1 April 1953 to 16 November 1957)
- No. 266 (Rhodesia) Squadron RAF (1 April 1953 to 16 November 1957)
- No. 541 Squadron RAF (7 November 1955 to 6 September 1957)

== History of No. 123 Airfield Headquarters ==
The unit was formed on 1 April 1943 at RAF Stoney Cross within No. 35 Wing RAF. It moved to RAF Gatwick on 7 April 1943, moving to RAF Odiham on 23 June 1943. It was reformed on 10 July 1943 at Odiham, moving to RAF Hutton Cranswick on 20 September 1943 then to RAF Huggate on 10 October 1943. The unit then moved to RAF Thruxton on 15 October 1943, then to RAF Sawbridgeworth on 12 November 1943 and to RAF Manston on 27 February 1944. It then moved to RAF Thorney Island on 1 April 1944 and was disbanded to become No. 123 Wing RAF on 12 May 1944.

Squadrons controlled:

- No. 26 (South African) Squadron RAF (1 April 1943 to 21 June 1943)
- No. 175 Squadron RAF (1 April 1943 to 7 April 1943) replaced by No. 183 (Gold Coast) Squadron RAF (8 April 1943 to 10 July 1943)
- No. 239 Squadron RAF (1 April 1943 to 21 June 1943)

Airfield HQ reformed on 10 July 1943

- No. 168 Squadron RAF (12 July 1943 to 30 November 1943)
- No. 268 Squadron RAF (13 July 1943 to 15 September 1943) replaced by No. 2 Squadron RAF (15 September 1943 to 12 May 1944)
- No. 170 Squadron RAF (14 July 1943 to 15 January 1944) replaced by No. 418 Squadron RCAF (20 January 1944 to 12 May 1944)
- No. 268 Squadron RAF (15 October 1943 to 7 November 1943) replaced by No. 63 Squadron RAF (8 November 1943 to 30 November 1943) replaced by No. 4 Squadron RAF (30 November 1943 to 3 January 1944)
- No. 183 (Gold Coast) Squadron RAF (4 March 1944 to 17 March 1944) (3 April 1944 to 12 May 1944)
- No. 198 Squadron RAF (4 March 1944 to 10 March 1944) replaced by No. 609 (West Riding) Squadron RAuxAF (10 March 1944 to 16 March 1944)
- No. 197 Squadron RAF (15 March 1944 to 1 April 1944) replaced by No. 198 Squadron RAF (3 April 1944 to 12 May 1944)
- No. 164 (Argentine–British) Squadron RAF (3 April 1944 to 12 May 1944)

== See also ==
- List of wings of the Royal Air Force
