= No. 198 Squadron RAF =

Defunct flying squadron of the Royal Air Force

- Active: 1917–1919; 1942–1945
- Country: United Kingdom
- Branch: Royal Air Force
- Mottos: Latin: Igni renatus "Born again in fire"

Insignia
- Squadron badge heraldry: A phoenix holding in its beak a sword

No. 198 Squadron was a Royal Air Force aircraft squadron that operated during the Second World War particularly in the ground attack role as the allies advanced through continental Europe.

== History ==
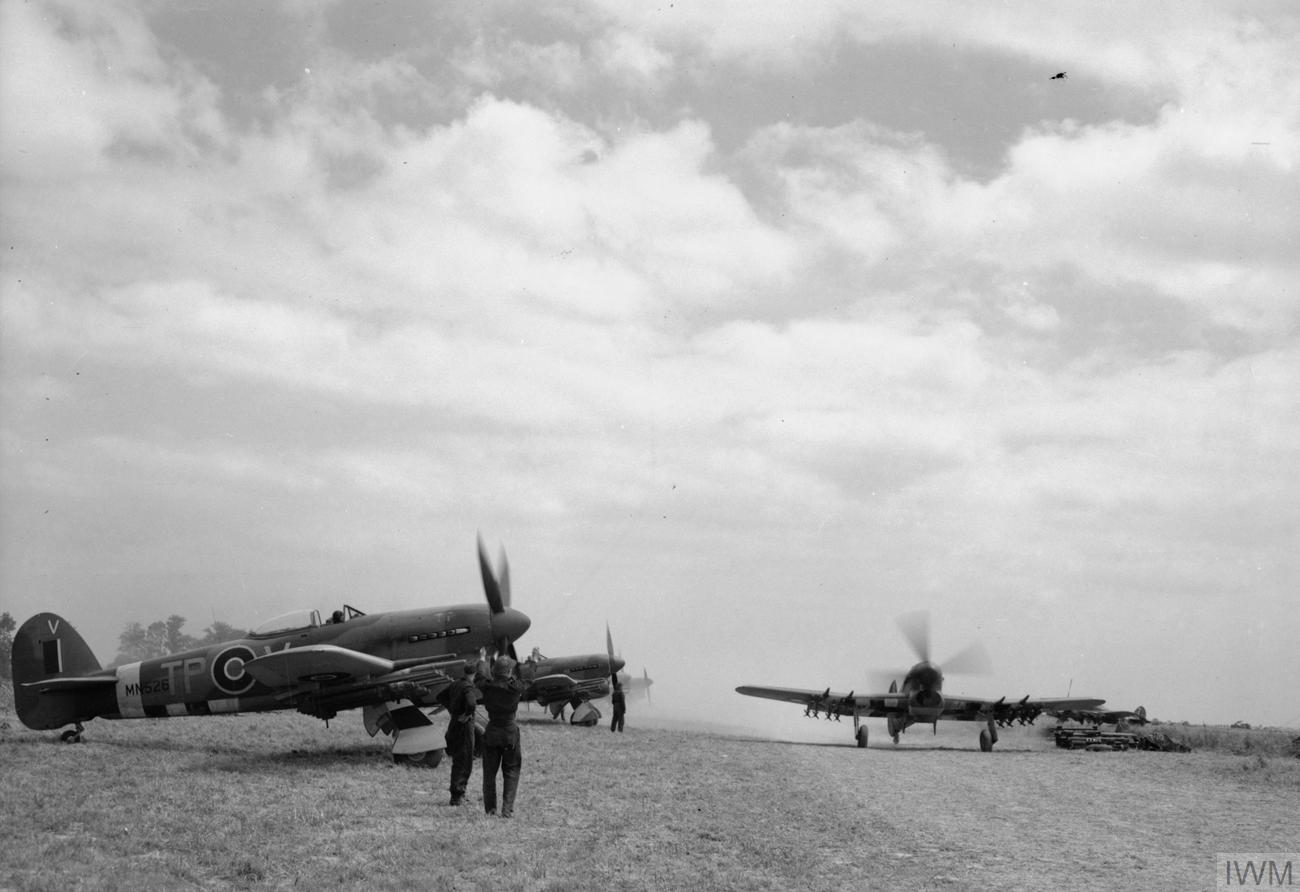
198 Squadron Typhoons on airfield B10/Plumetot, France, in July 1944.

The squadron reformed at RAF Digby as a fighter squadron equipped with the Hawker Typhoon on 8 December 1942. From March 1943 198 Squadron joined 609 Squadron at RAF Manston where it provided fighter-escorts to the twin-engined Westland Whirlwind fighter-bombers on sorties into continental Europe. Over the next nine months 198 Squadron and 609 Squadron were the only Typhoon units to operate full-time on escort duties for RAF and USAAF bombers and long-range fighter sweeps (code-named "Ramrods") over France, Belgium and the Netherlands; during these operations the squadron used long-range Typhoons each equipped with a cigar-shaped 45 imp gallon fuel tank mounted below each wing. In these roles the unit was very successful, becoming one of the top scoring Typhoon units.

During this time most of the other Typhoon units began to be equipped with bomb racks or RP-3 rocket rails and had started training to carry out ground attack operations in preparation for the cross-Channel invasion.

After building up a score of enemy aircraft destroyed the squadron changed role to ground attack at the beginning of 1944, when the Typhoons were fitted with RP-3 rockets. In January 1944 the squadron became part of the RAF Second Tactical Air Force's "123 Airfield" (later known as 123 Wing), (Note: These combined units of two or more squadrons were to be designated "Airfields" rather than "Wings" for several months.) partnered with 609 Squadron. Initially 123 Airfield was commanded by New Zealander Wing commander Desmond J. Scott.

The squadron lost several of its pilots during this re-organisation to bring them into line with 2nd TAF's established strength requirements, and the ground crew echelon was completely changed. Morale slumped for a short while, but soon picked up as the squadron became familiarised with its new role. In March 1944 Scott was replaced by Wg Cdr R. E. P Brooker and 123 Wing moved to an "Armament Practice Camp" (APC) at Llanbedr in Wales (Note: The APC at Llanbedr -called 13 APC - was one of several which had been set up throughout the UK to provide training for all 2nd TAF units.) before moving in April to RAF Thorney Island in preparation for D-Day. After the landings the squadron was heavily involved in fighting around Caen using the rocket-equipped Typhoons against tanks and enemy positions. In July it moved to France and followed the advancing troops into the Netherlands and eventually moving to Wunstorf in Germany in May 1945. On 15 September 1945 the squadron was disbanded.

The RAF's top scoring Typhoon pilot was 198 Squadron's John Robert Baldwin, who claimed 15 aircraft shot down during 1942–44. Baldwin became commanding officer of the squadron in November 1943 and relinquished command in April 1944. He continued his association with 198 Squadron and ended the war as a Group Captain commanding No. 84 (Typhoon) Group.

== Aircraft operated ==
Dates	Aircraft	Variant	Notes
1942–1943	Hawker Typhoon	IA	Original 12 x .303 armed Typhoon variant. A few were used to train pilots.
1942–1944	Hawker Typhoon	IB	Main production variant. Armed with 4 20mm cannon. Squadron used aircraft equipped with RP-3 rockets from early 1944.

=== Aircraft and pilot Losses ===
16 February 1943 – 15 September 1945
Dates	Aircraft lost	Pilots killed	Unit roles – notable events
16 February 1943 – 31 December 1943	25	9	Training and squadron work-up. Fighter interception missions over English coast and long-range fighter sweeps and bomber escort missions over France
1 January 1944 – 5 June 1944	12	10	Became part of 123 Airfield, 2 TAF. Start of ground attack operations. Attacks on V-1 flying bomb launch sites, coastal radar installations
6 June 1944 – 31 December 1944	27	20	123 Airfield operating during D-Day and Battle of Normandy. Intensive ground attack sorties in support of ground troops: Caen breakout and Falaise pocket
1 January 1945 – 8 May 1945	16	4	Bodenplatte to V-E Day
9 May 1945 – 15 September 1945	1	-	Squadron officially disbanded 15 September
Total:	81	43	

== Commanding officers 1942 to 1945 ==
Squadron leaders
Name	Awards	Period in command	Notes
S/Ldr J. W. Villa	DFC	Dec 1942 – May 1943.	
S/Ldr J. Manak	DFC	May 1943 – Aug 1943.	Shot down by flak, ditched aircraft west of Knocke, became PoW, 28 August 1943.
S/Ldr C C F Cooper		Aug 1943 – October 1943	Shot down by flak, baled out near Klundert, became PoW, 4 October 1943.
S/Ldr J. M. Bryan	DFC	Aug 1943 – Nov 1943.	
S/Ldr J. R. Baldwin	DSO, DFC & Bar	Nov 1943 – Apr 1944.	Top scoring Typhoon pilot. Moved from 609 Squadron to command 198. Went on to become Group Captain 84 Group. MIA Korean War .
S/Ldr J. M. Bryan	DFC	Apr 1944 – May 1944.	Went on to become Wing Commander, C/O 136 Wing. Shot down by flak : KIA 10 June 1944.
S/Ldr J. Niblett	DFC	May 1944 – June 1944.	Shot down by flak attacking radar site near Dieppe and killed 2 June 1944.
S/Ldr I. J. Davies	DFC	June 1944.	Shot down by flak engaging ground target near Cherbourg: KIA 22 June 1944.
S/Ldr Y. P. E. H. Ezanno	Croix de Guerre	June 1944 – Oct 1944.	Free French Air Forces. Tour ended 22 October 1944.
S/Ldr A. W. Ridler		Oct 1944 – Dec 1944.	
S/Ldr N. J. Durrant	DFC	Dec 1944 – Sept 1945.	

== See also ==
- Second Tactical Air Force
- Operation Jericho
- Cap Arcona
