= No. 197 Squadron RAF =

Defunct flying squadron of the Royal Air Force

- Active: 9 August 1917 – 17 November 1917; 21 November 1942 – 31 August 1945
- Country: United Kingdom
- Branch: Royal Air Force
- Mottos: Latin: Findimus caelum ("We cleave the sky")

Insignia
- Squadron Badge: A sabre held by a gauntlet.
- Squadron Codes: OV (Nov 1942 – Aug 1945)

No. 197 Squadron RAF was a Royal Air Force Squadron formed in World War I and reformed as a fighter-bomber unit in World War II.

== History ==
=== Formation and World War I ===
No. 197 Squadron Royal Flying Corps was formed in Egypt on 9 August 1917, but it disbanded on 17 November 1917 upon re-designation as an artillery observation school, having not received any aircraft.

=== Reformation in World War II ===
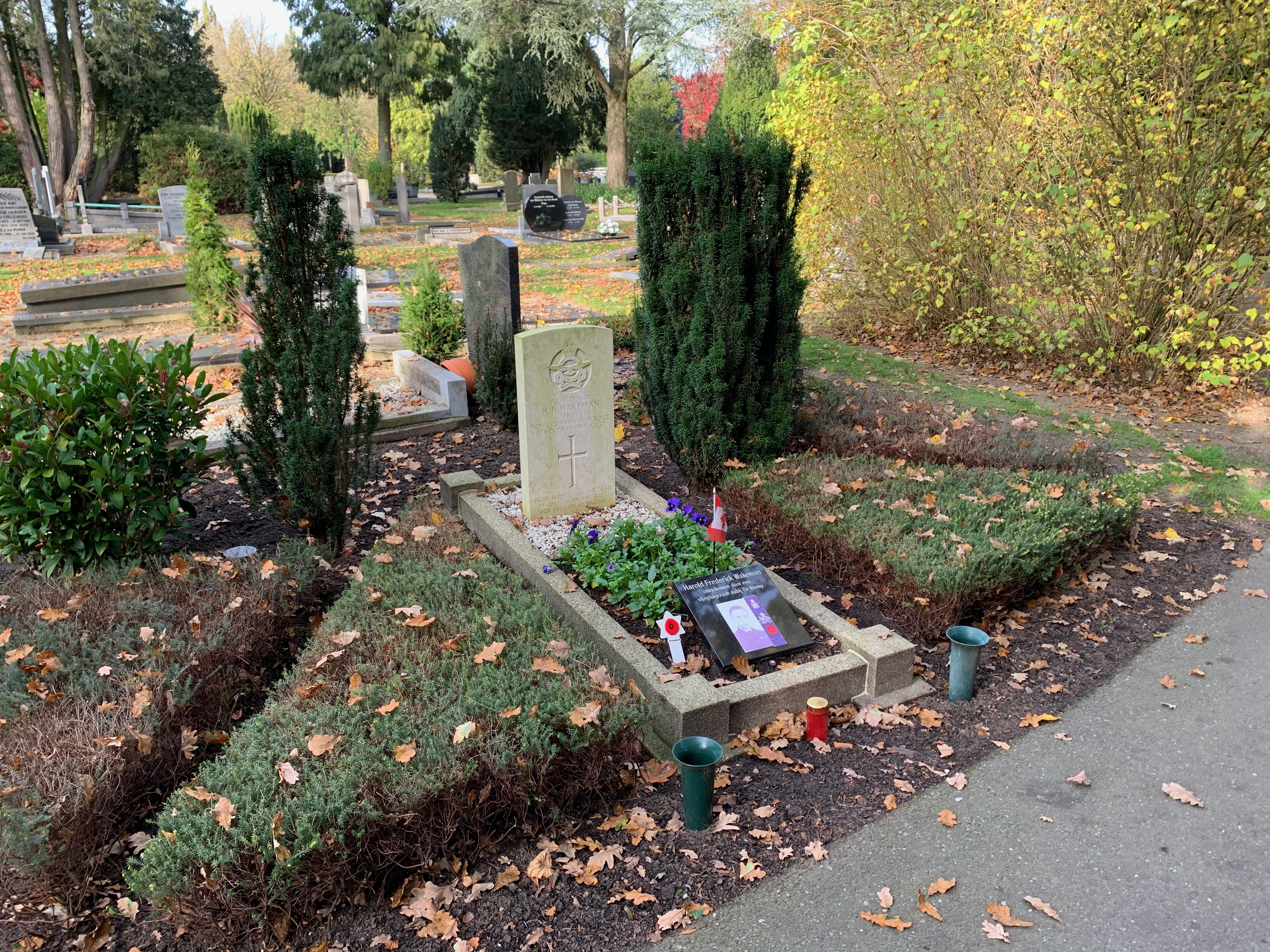
CWGC grave in Veenendaal, the Netherlands, of an RCAF officer who served in 197 Squadron and died in 1944

The squadron reformed on 21 November 1942 at RAF Turnhouse and was supplied with Typhoons. It then operated from RAF Manston, RAF Tangmere and RAF Hurn. It supported the Normandy landings in June 1944 and re-located to France where it followed the Allied advance across Europe seeking targets of opportunity. On 3 May 1945 the squadron took part in the attack that resulted in the sinking of the SS Cap Arcona. It disbanded at Hildesheim, Germany, on 31 August 1945.

== Aircraft operated ==
Aircraft operated by No. 197 Squadron RAF
From	To	Aircraft	Variant
Nov 1942	Jan 1943	Hawker Typhoon	IA
Nov 1942	Aug 1945	Hawker Typhoon	IB
