= Hawker Typhoon =

British single-seater fighter-bomber

Typhoon
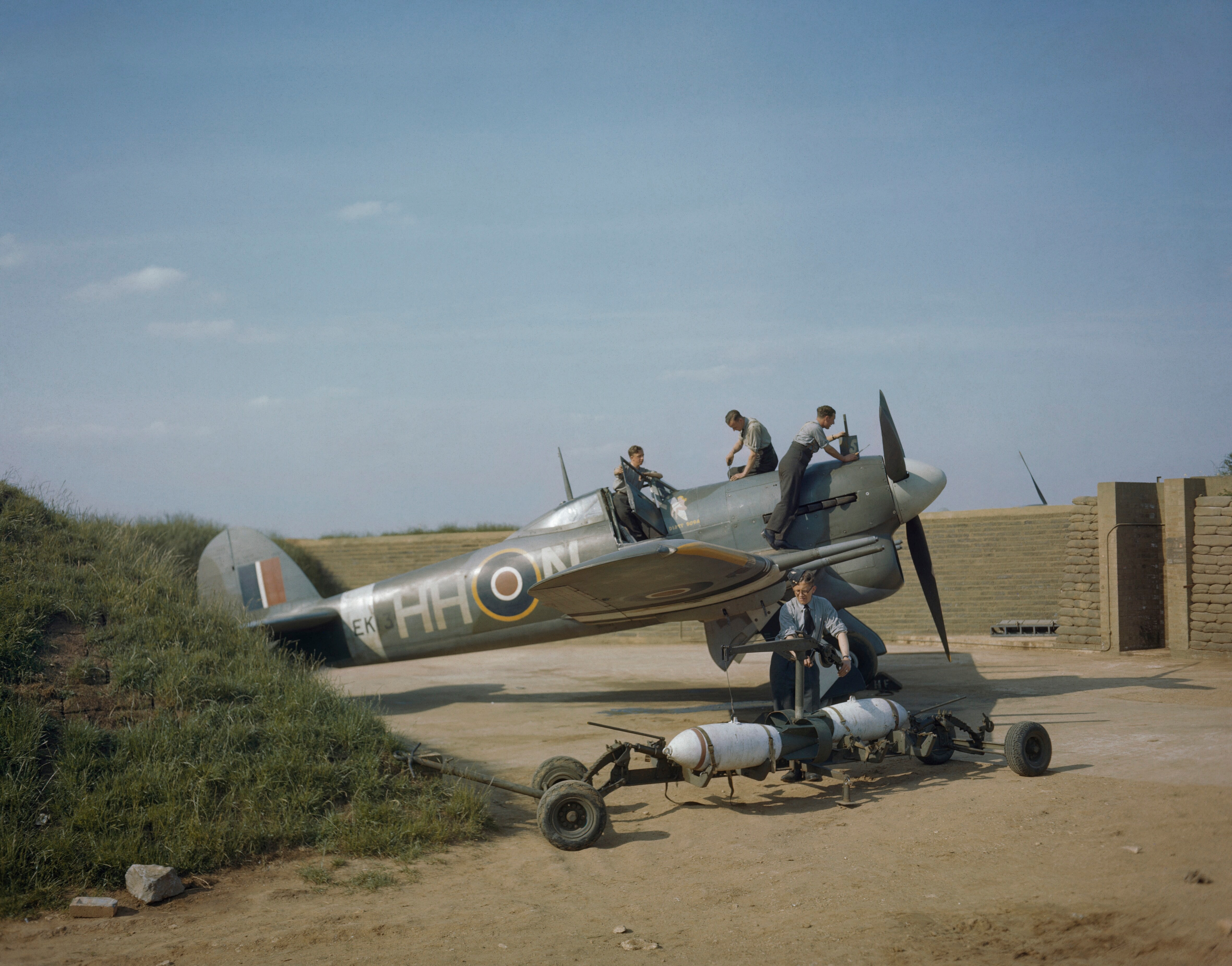
- Typhoon Ib "Dirty Dora" of 175 Sqn. being armed with concrete practice bombs in late 1943 at RAF Colerne, Wiltshire

General information
- Type: Fighter-bomber
- National origin: United Kingdom
- Manufacturer: Hawker Aircraft
- Designer: Sydney Camm
- Built by: Gloster Aircraft Company
- Primary users: Royal Air Force: Royal Canadian Air Force; Royal New Zealand Air Force
- Number built: 3,317

History
- Manufactured: 1941–1945
- Introduction date: 11 September 1941
- First flight: 24 February 1940
- Retired: October 1945
- Developed into: Hawker Tempest

The Hawker Typhoon is a British single-seat fighter-bomber, produced by Hawker Aircraft. It was intended to be a medium-high altitude interceptor, as a replacement for the Hawker Hurricane, but several design problems were encountered and it never completely satisfied this requirement.

The Typhoon was originally designed to mount twelve .303 inch (7.7 mm) Browning machine guns and be powered by the latest 2,000 hp (1,500 kW) engines. Its service introduction in mid-1941 was plagued with problems and for several months the aircraft faced a doubtful future. When the Luftwaffe brought the new Focke-Wulf Fw 190 into service in 1941, the Typhoon was the only RAF fighter capable of catching it at low altitudes; as a result it secured a new role as a low-altitude interceptor.

The Typhoon became established in roles such as night-time intruder and long-range fighter. From late 1942 the Typhoon was equipped with bombs, these bomb-carrying aircraft being nicknamed "Bomphoon" by the press. From late 1943 RP-3 rockets were added to its armoury. With those weapons and its four 20 mm Hispano autocannon, the Typhoon became one of the Second World War's most successful ground-attack aircraft.

== Design and development ==
=== Origins ===
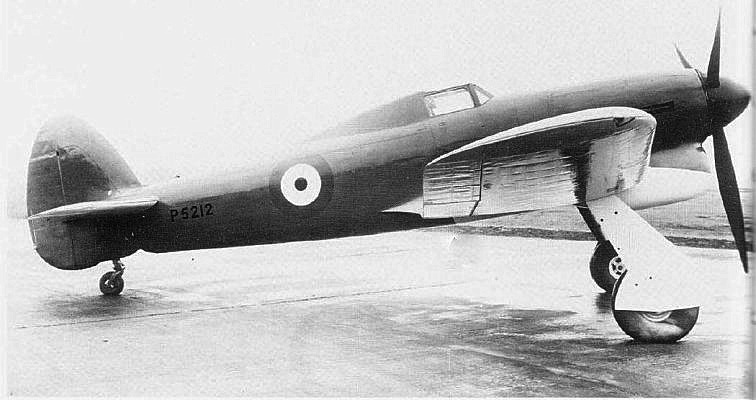
The unarmed first prototype Typhoon P5212 taken just before its first flight. The prototype had a small tail unit and a solid fairing behind the cockpit, which was fitted with "car door" access hatches

Even as Hurricane production began in March 1937, Sydney Camm embarked on designing its successor. Camm had contacted the Air Ministry and asked what projects Hawker could consider, number two on their list was a single-engined fighter. Two preliminary designs were similar and larger than the Hurricane. These later became known as the "N" and "R" (from the initial of the engine manufacturers), because they were designed for the newly developed Napier Sabre and Rolls-Royce Vulture, engines respectively. Both engines used 24 cylinders and were designed for over 2,000 hp (1,500 kW); the difference between the two was primarily in the arrangement of the cylinders – an H-block in the Sabre, and an X-block in the Vulture. Hawker submitted these preliminary designs in July 1937, but were advised by the Director of Technical Development to wait until a formal specification for a new fighter to replace the Spitfire and Hurricane was issued. He also cautioned that while they liked the design, they did not think the wing would be stiff enough.

In March 1938, Hawker received the complete Specification F.18/37 and invitation to tender for a fighter which would be able to achieve at least 400 mph (640 km/h; 350 kn) at 15,000 feet (4,600 m), a ceiling of not less than 35,000 ft and specified a British engine with a two-speed supercharger. The armament fitted was to be twelve .303 inch (7.7 mm) Browning machine guns with 500 rounds per gun, with a provision for alternative combinations of weaponry. As well as Hawker, Gloster, Supermarine and Bristol submitted one or more designs each. Two prototypes of both the Type N and R were ordered on 3 March 1938 Camm and his design team started formal development of the designs and construction of prototypes. (Note: The "R" Tornado prototype, which flew before that of the Typhoon, could be identified by its ventral radiator unit and slightly rounder nose profile with a carburettor intake on top of the nose and two sets of exhaust stacks on either side of the engine cowling.)

A contract for 500 Vulture and 500 Sabre engined fighters to F.9/37 was placed with Hawker on 10 July 1939. The official names 'Tornado' and 'Typhoon' were issued in August and December respectively.

The basic design of the Typhoon was a combination of traditional Hawker construction, as used in the earlier Hawker Hurricane, and more modern construction techniques; the front fuselage structure, from the engine mountings to the rear of the cockpit, was made up of bolted and welded duralumin or steel tubes covered with skin panels, while the rear fuselage was a flush-riveted, semi-monocoque structure. (Note: The Typhoon and Tornado's forward fuselage structure was a refinement of techniques first developed by Fred Sigrist and Camm in 1925.) The forward fuselage and cockpit skinning was made up of large, removable duralumin panels, allowing easy external access to the engine and engine accessories and most of the important hydraulic and electrical equipment.

The wing had a span of 41 feet 7 inches (12.67 m), with a wing area of 279 sq ft (25.9 m^{2}). It was designed with a small amount of inverted gull wing bend; the inner sections had a 1° anhedral, while the outer sections, attached just outboard of the undercarriage legs, had a dihedral of 5 1/2°. The airfoil was a NACA 22 wing section, with a thickness-to-chord ratio of 19.5% at the root tapering to 12% at the tip.

The wing possessed great structural strength, provided plenty of room for fuel tanks and a heavy armament, while allowing the aircraft to be a steady gun platform. Each of the inner wings incorporated two fuel tanks; the "main" tanks, housed in a bay outboard and to the rear of the main undercarriage bays, had a capacity of 40 imperial gallons (180 L; 48 US gal); while the "nose" tanks, built into the wing leading edges, forward of the main spar, had a capacity of 37 imperial gallons (170 L; 44 US gal) each. Also incorporated into the inner wings were inward-retracting landing gear with a wide track of 13 ft 6 3/4 in.

By contemporary standards, the new design's wing was very "thick", similar to the Hurricane before it. Although the Typhoon was expected to achieve over 400 mph (640 km/h; 350 kn) in level flight at 20,000 ft, the thick wings created a large drag rise and prevented higher speeds than the 410 mph at 20,000 feet (6,100 m) achieved in tests. (Note: This was a phenomenon called compressibility and wave drag.) The climb rate and performance above that level was also considered disappointing. When the Typhoon was dived at speeds of over 500 mph (800 km/h; 430 kn), the drag rise caused buffeting and trim changes. These compressibility problems led to Camm designing the Typhoon II, later known as the Tempest, which used much thinner wings with a laminar flow airfoil.

=== Prototypes ===
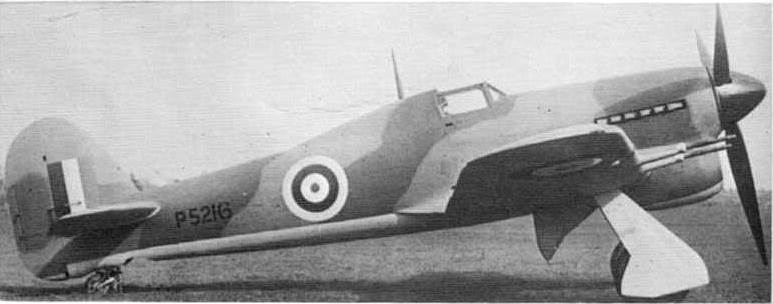
The second prototype P5216 in the standard RAF camouflage of 1941, possibly with yellow undersurfaces. The retractable tailwheel and main wheels now had doors fitted. Six exhaust stubs and the later standardised four cannon armament were other changes from P5212.

The first flight of the first Typhoon prototype, P5212, made by Hawker's Chief test Pilot Philip Lucas from Langley, was delayed until 24 February 1940 because problems with the development of the Sabre engine meant a flight engine did not arrive until December 1939. Although unarmed for its first flights, P5212 later carried twelve .303 in (7.7 mm) Brownings, set in groups of six in each outer wing panel; this was the armament fitted to the first 110 Typhoons, known as the Typhoon IA. (Note: Although the four cannon were the preferred armament there was a shortage of the Châtelleraut cannon feed mechanism. Some Typhoon IAs were later converted to IB standard.) P5212 also had a small tail-fin, triple exhaust stubs and no wheel doors fitted to the centre-section. On 9 May 1940 the prototype had a mid-air structural failure, at the join between the forward fuselage and rear fuselage, just behind the pilot's seat. Philip Lucas could see daylight through the split but instead of bailing out, landed the Typhoon and was later awarded the George Medal.

On 15 May 1940, the Minister of Aircraft Production, Lord Beaverbrook, ordered that resources should be concentrated on the production of five main aircraft types: the Spitfire and Hurricane fighters and the Armstrong Whitworth Whitley, Vickers Wellington and Bristol Blenheim bombers. As a result, development of the Typhoon was slowed, production plans were postponed and test flying continued at a reduced rate.

As a result of the delays the second prototype, P5216, first flew on 3 May 1941: P5216 carried an armament of four belt-fed 20 mm (0.79 in) Hispano Mk II cannon, with 140 rounds per gun and was the prototype of the Typhoon IB series. Specification F.9/37 had been modified to include cannon armament as progress with the Westland Whirlwind cannon fighter (to F.37/35) and Boulton Paul's twin-engined turret fighter (F.11/37) with cannon was slow.

In the interim between construction of the first and second prototypes, the Air Ministry had given Hawker an instruction to proceed with the construction of 1,000 of the new fighters. It was felt that the Vulture engine was more promising, so the order covered 500 Tornadoes and 250 Typhoons, with the balance to be decided once the two had been compared.

It was also decided that because Hawker was concentrating on Hurricane production, the Tornado would be built by Avro and Gloster would build the Typhoons at Hucclecote. Avro and Gloster were aircraft companies within the Hawker Siddeley group. As a result of good progress by Gloster, the first production Typhoon R7576 was first flown on 27 May 1941 by Michael Daunt, just over three weeks after the second prototype.

== Operational service ==
=== Low-level interceptor ===
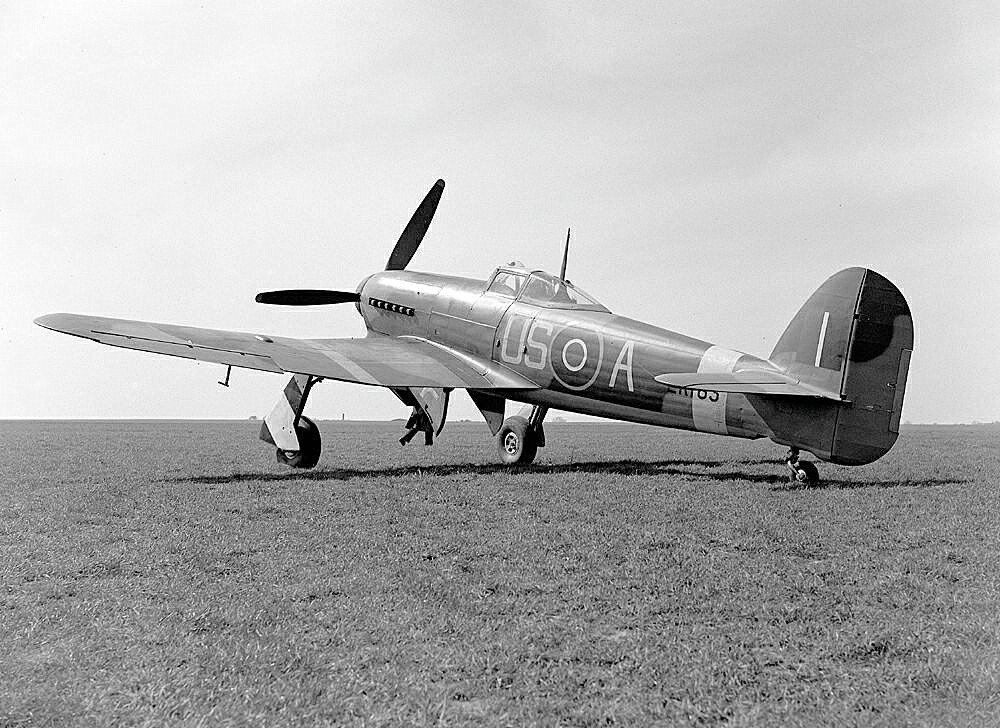
A Mark IB Typhoon US-A in April 1943. It was flown by Squadron Leader T.H.V Pheloung (New Zealand). (Note: On 20 June 1943, Sqn Ldr Pheloung flying EK184, US-C, was hit by flak and crashed into the sea while attacking shipping.) An 18-inch-wide (460 mm) yellow recognition stripe is visible on the upper wing.

In 1941, the Spitfire Mk Vs, which equipped the bulk of Fighter Command squadrons, were outclassed by the new Focke-Wulf Fw 190 and suffered many losses. The Typhoon was rushed into service with Nos. 56 and 609 Squadrons in late 1941, to counter the Fw 190. This decision proved to be a disaster, as several Typhoons were lost for unknown reasons and the Air Ministry began to consider halting production of the type.

In August 1942, Hawker's second test pilot, Ken Seth-Smith, while deputising for Lucas, carried out a straight and level speed test from Hawker's test centre at Langley, and the aircraft broke up over Thorpe, killing the pilot. Sydney Camm and the design team immediately ruled out pilot error, which had been suspected in earlier crashes. Investigation revealed that the elevator mass-balance had torn away from the fuselage structure. Intense flutter developed, the structure failed and the tail broke away. Modification 286 to the structure and the control runs partially solved the structural problem. (The 1940 Philip Lucas test flight incident had been due to an unrelated failing.) Mod 286, which involved fastening external fishplates, or reinforcing plates, around the tail of the aircraft, and eventually internal strengthening, was only a partial remedy, and there were still failures right up to the end of the Typhoon's service life. The Sabre engine was also a constant source of problems, notably in colder weather, when it was very difficult to start, and it suffered problems with wear of its sleeve valves, with consequently high oil consumption. The 24-cylinder engine also produced a very high-pitched engine note, which pilots found very fatiguing.

The Typhoon did not begin to mature as a reliable aircraft until the end of 1942, when its excellent qualities – seen from the start by S/L Roland Beamont of 609 Squadron – became apparent. Beamont had worked as a Hawker production test pilot while resting from operations, and had stayed with Seth-Smith, having his first flight in the aircraft at that time. During late 1942 and early 1943, the Typhoon squadrons were based on airfields near the south and south-east coasts of England and, alongside two squadrons with the Griffon-engined Spitfire XII, countered the Luftwaffe's "tip and run" low-level nuisance raids, shooting down a score or more bomb-carrying Fw 190s. Typhoon squadrons kept at least one pair of aircraft on standing patrols over the south coast, with another pair kept at "readiness" (ready to take off within two minutes) throughout daylight hours. These sections of Typhoons flew at 500 feet (150 m) or lower, with enough height to spot and then intercept the incoming enemy fighter-bombers. The Typhoon finally proved itself in this role; for example, while flying patrols against these low-level raids, 486 (NZ) Squadron claimed 20 fighter-bombers, plus three bombers shot down, between mid-October 1942 and mid-July 1943. (Note: 486(NZ)Squadron started re-equipping with Typhoons in July 1942, initially using them as night fighters paired with Turbinlite searchlight equipped Douglas Havoc aircraft with radar. However, the Typhoon proved to be too fast for Turbinlite duties and 486 Sqn was quickly reassigned to the day fighter role.)

The first two Messerschmitt Me 210 fighter-bombers to be destroyed over the British Isles were shot down by Typhoons in August 1942. During a daylight raid by the Luftwaffe on London on 20 January 1943, four Messerschmitt Bf 109G-4s and one Fw 190A-4 of JG 26 were destroyed by Typhoons. As soon as the aircraft entered service, it was apparent the profile of the Typhoon resembled a Fw 190 from some angles, which caused more than one friendly fire incident involving Allied anti-aircraft units and other fighters. This led to Typhoons first being marked up with all-white noses, and later with high visibility black and white stripes under the wings, a precursor of the markings applied to all Allied aircraft on D-Day.

=== Switch to ground attack ===
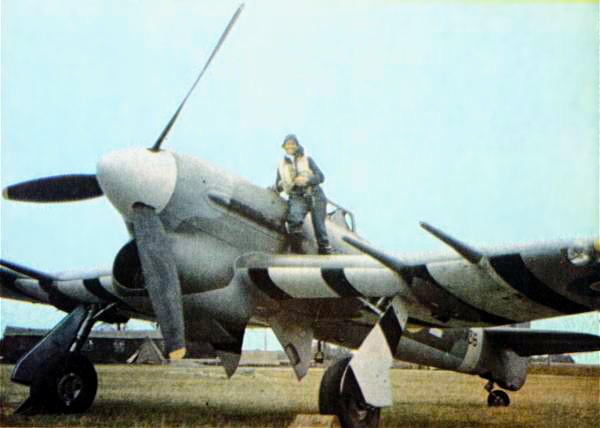
Typhoon JP736 of No 175 Squadron with black and white identification stripes under the wings

By 1943, the RAF needed a ground attack fighter more than a "pure" fighter and the Typhoon was suited to the role (and less-suited to the pure fighter role than competing aircraft such as the Spitfire Mk IX). The powerful engine allowed the aircraft to carry a load of up to two 1,000 pounds (450 kg) bombs, equal to the light bombers of only a few years earlier. The bomb-equipped aircraft were nicknamed "Bombphoons" and entered service with No. 181 Squadron, formed in September 1942. (Note: The Typhoon's original bomb load of 500 lb (230 kg) was doubled and then doubled again.)

From September 1943, Typhoons were also armed with four "60 lb" RP-3 rockets under each wing. (Note: A 6-inch-diameter (150 mm), 60 lb (27 kg) high explosive warhead was the main version used on Typhoons. Also used was solid 25 lb (11 kg), armour piercing warhead against ships) In October 1943, No. 181 Squadron made the first Typhoon rocket attacks. Although the rocket projectiles were inaccurate and took considerable skill to aim and allow for ballistic drop after firing, "the sheer firepower of just one Typhoon was equivalent to a destroyer's broadside". By the end of 1943, eighteen rocket-equipped Typhoon squadrons formed the basis of the RAF Second Tactical Air Force (2nd TAF) ground attack arm in Europe. In theory, the rocket rails and bomb-racks were interchangeable; in practice, to simplify supply, some 2nd TAF Typhoon squadrons (such as 198 Squadron) used the rockets only, while other squadrons were armed exclusively with bombs (this also allowed individual units to more finely hone their skills with their assigned weapons).

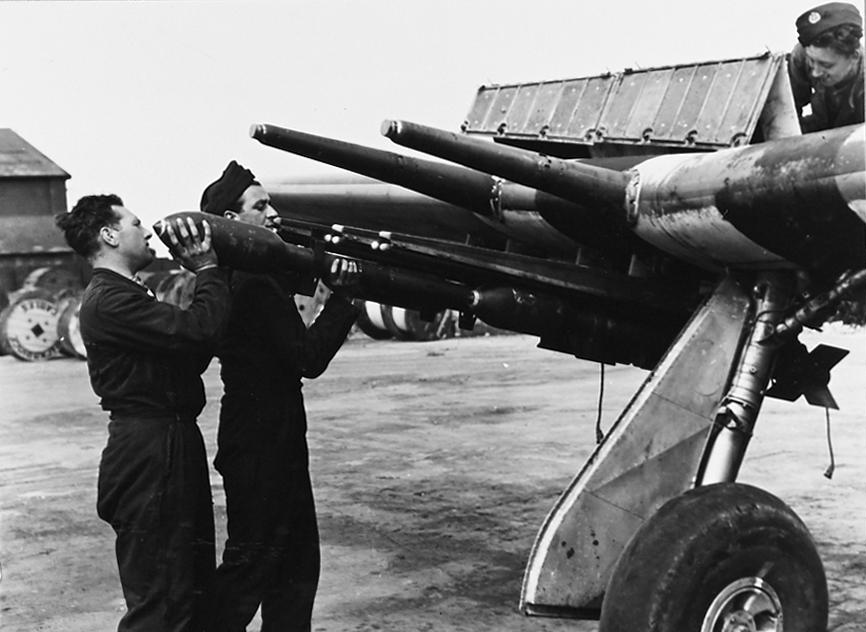
Armourers loading RP-3 rockets with 60 lb High Explosive heads onto steel Mk. I rails. The large hinged gun bay doors are open. The weathered Invasion stripes are on upper and lower wing surfaces, indicating this photo was taken some time in June 1944.

By the Normandy landings in June 1944, 2 TAF had eighteen operational squadrons of Typhoon IBs, while RAF Fighter Command had a further nine. The aircraft proved itself to be the most effective RAF tactical strike aircraft, on interdiction raids against communications and transport targets deep in North Western Europe prior to the invasion and in direct support of the Allied ground forces after D-Day. A system of close liaison with the ground troops was set up by the RAF and army: RAF radio operators in vehicles equipped with VHF radio telegraphy (R/T) travelled with the troops close to the front line and called up Typhoons operating in a "cab rank", which attacked the targets, marked for them by smoke shells fired by mortar or artillery, until they were destroyed.

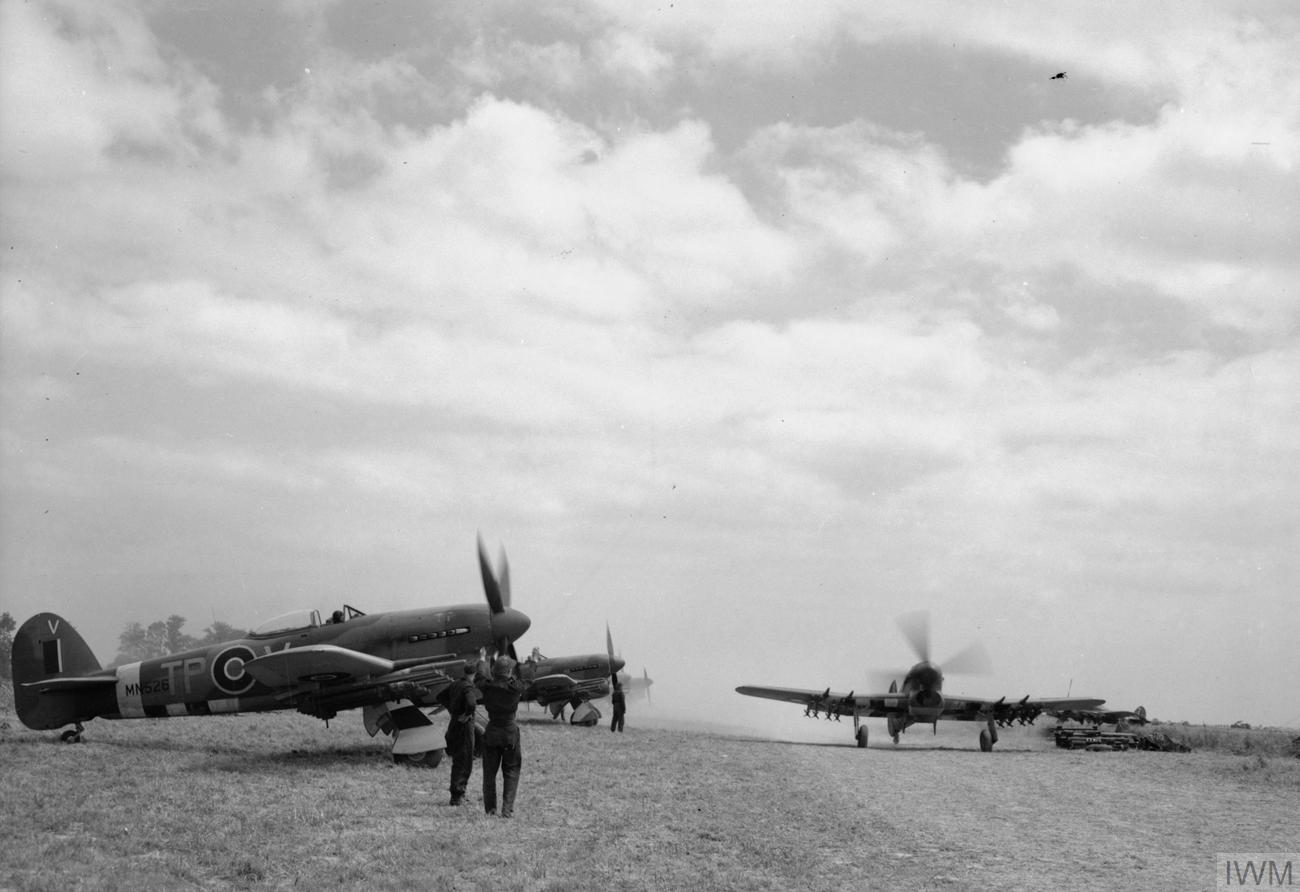
198 Sqn. Typhoons on Advanced Landing Ground airfield B10/Plumetot, France, in July 1944. MN526 TP-V has the larger Tempest tailplane and a four-bladed propeller.

Analysis of destroyed tanks after the Normandy battle showed a hit-rate for the air-fired rockets of only 4%. In Operation Goodwood (18–21 July), the 2nd Tactical Air Force claimed 257 tanks destroyed. (Note: The 9th USAAF claimed a further 134 tanks) A total of 222 were claimed by Typhoon pilots using rocket projectiles. Once the area was secured, the British "Operational Research Section 2" analysts could confirm only ten out of the 456 knocked out German AFVs found in the area were attributable to Typhoons using rocket projectiles.

At Mortain, in the Falaise pocket, a German counter-attack (Operation Luttich) that started on 7 August threatened Patton's break-out from the beachhead; this counter-attack was repulsed by 2nd Tactical Air Force Typhoons and the 9th USAAF. During the course of the battle, pilots of the 2nd Tactical Air Force and 9th USAAF claimed to have destroyed a combined total of 252 tanks. Only 177 German tanks and assault guns participated in the battle and only 46 were lost – of which nine were verified as destroyed by Typhoons, four percent of the total claimed.

However, after-action studies at the time were based on random sampling of wrecks rather than exhaustive surveys, and the degree of overclaim attributed to Typhoon pilots as a result was statistically improbable in view of the far lower known level of overclaim by Allied pilots in air-to-air combat, where claims were if anything more likely to be mistaken. Allied and German witness accounts of Typhoon attacks on German armour indicate that RPs did kill tanks with fair probability. Horst Weber, an SS panzergrenadier serving with Kampfgruppe Knaust south of Arnhem in the later stages of Operation Market Garden, recalled that, during a battle with British 43rd Wessex Division on 23 September 1944, "We had four Tiger tanks and three Panther tanks ... We were convinced that we would gain another victory here, that we would smash the enemy forces. But then Typhoons dropped these rockets on our tanks and shot all seven to bits. And we cried... We would see two black dots in the sky and that always meant rockets. Then the rockets would hit the tanks which would burn. The soldiers would come out all burnt and screaming with pain." Stuart Hills, a tank commander, was in an armoured column that was ambushed by a Tiger tank on 2 August 1944. The air officer accompanying them called up four Typhoons off the cab-rank to attack the Tiger and Hills recorded “…the [Typhoons] came in, very low and with a tremendous roar. The second plane scored a direct hit and, when the smoke cleared, we could see the Tiger lying on its side minus its turret and with no sign of any survivors. It was an awesome display of firepower…”

The effect on the morale of German troops caught up in a Typhoon RP and cannon attack was decisive, with many tanks and vehicles being abandoned, in spite of superficial damage, such that, at Mortain, a signal from the German Army's Chief of Staff stated that the attack had been brought to a standstill by 13:00 "due to the employment of fighter-bombers by the enemy, and the absence of our own air-support". The 20 mm cannon also destroyed a large number of (unarmoured) support vehicles, laden with fuel and ammunition for the armoured vehicles. On 10 July at Mortain, flying in support of the US 30th Infantry Division, Typhoons flew 294 sorties in the afternoon that day. They engaged the German formations while the US 9th Air Force prevented German fighters from intervening. Dwight D. Eisenhower, the Supreme Allied Commander, said of the Typhoons; "The chief credit in smashing the enemy's spearhead, however, must go to the rocket-firing Typhoon aircraft of the Second Tactical Air Force ... The result of the strafing was that the enemy attack was effectively brought to a halt, and a threat was turned into a great victory."

Another form of attack carried out by Typhoons was "Cloak and Dagger" operations, using intelligence sources to target German HQs. With medium bombers, 42 Typhoons carried out an attack on 10 June against the headquarters of Panzergruppe West wounding the general, killing several staff officers and disrupting a planned counterattack against the Allied forces. One of the most effective of these was carried out on 24 October 1944, when 146 Typhoon Wing attacked a building in Dordrecht, where senior members of the German 15th Army staff were meeting; 17 staff officers and 36 other officers were killed and the operations of the 15th Army were adversely affected for some time afterwards.

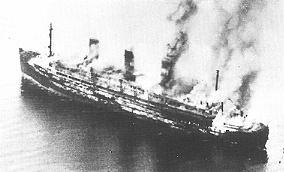
Cap Arcona burning shortly after the Hawker Typhoons aerial attacks and bombings

On 24 March 1945, over 400 Typhoons were sent on several sorties each, to suppress German anti-aircraft guns and Wehrmacht resistance to Operation Varsity, the Allied airborne crossing of the Rhine that involved two full divisions of 16,600 troops and 1,770 gliders sent across the river.

On 3 May 1945, the Cap Arcona, the SS Thielbek, and the Deutschland, large passenger ships in peacetime now in military service, were sunk in four attacks by RAF Hawker Typhoon 1Bs of No. 83 Group RAF, 2nd Tactical Air Force: the first by 184 Squadron, second by 198 Squadron led by Wing Commander John Robert Baldwin, the third by 263 Squadron led by Squadron Leader Martin T. S. Rumbold and the fourth by 197 Squadron led by Squadron Leader K. J. Harding. German trawlers sent to rescue Cap Arcona's crew members and guards managed to save 16 sailors, 400 German SS men, and 20 SS women. Only 350 of the 5,000 former concentration camp inmates aboard Cap Arcona survived. From 2,800 prisoners on board the S.S. Thielbek only 50 were saved; whereas all 2,000 prisoners on the S.S. Deutschland were safely taken off onto the S.S. Athen, before the Deutschland capsized. R.A.F. Pilot Allan Wyse of No. 193 Squadron recalled, "We used our cannon fire at the chaps in the water... we shot them up with 20 mm cannons in the water. Horrible thing, but we were told to do it and we did it. That's war."

The top-scoring Typhoon ace was Group Captain J. R. Baldwin (609 Squadron and Commanding Officer 198 Squadron, 146 (Typhoon) Wing and 123 (Typhoon) Wing), who claimed 15 aircraft shot down from 1942 to 1944. Some 246 Axis aircraft were claimed by Typhoon pilots during the war.

3,317 Typhoons were built, almost all by Gloster. Hawker developed what was originally an improved Typhoon II, but the differences between it and the Mk I were so great that it was effectively a different aircraft, and was renamed the Hawker Tempest. Once the war in Europe was over Typhoons were quickly removed from front-line squadrons; by October 1945 the Typhoon was no longer in operational use, with many of the wartime Typhoon units such as 198 Squadron being either disbanded or renumbered.

=== Captured Typhoons ===
By 1943, with its change of role to ground attack, the Typhoon was constantly operating over enemy territory: inevitably some flyable examples fell into German hands. The first Typhoon to be flown by the Luftwaffe was EJ956 SA-I of 486 (NZ) Sqn. On 23 March 1943, two aircraft flown by F/O Smith and F/S Mawson were on a "Rhubarb" over France. (Note: A "Rhubarb" was a small scale attack on enemy ground targets of opportunity. Usually, these were undertaken by a section of two aircraft. Ideally, there would be a heavy cloud base at 2,000–3,000 ft (610–910 m); should fighter opposition be too heavy it would be possible to pull up into the cloud.) Just as they were crossing the coast at low altitude, Mawson's Typhoon was hit by light flak. He managed to belly-land in a field near Cany-Barville but the aircraft was captured before he could destroy it. The Typhoon was repaired and test flown at Rechlin a German equivalent to RAE Farnborough, and later served as T9+GK with "Zirkus Rosarius". EJ956 overturned and was written off during a forced landing near Meckelfeld, on 10 August 1944. On 14 February 1944, another Typhoon was captured and later flown in Zirkus Rosarius. JP548 of 174 Squadron force landed after engine failure near Blois, France; the pilot, F/O Proddow, evaded capture. This Typhoon crashed at Reinsehlen on 29 July 1944, killing Feldwebel Gold.

== Modifications 1941–1945 ==
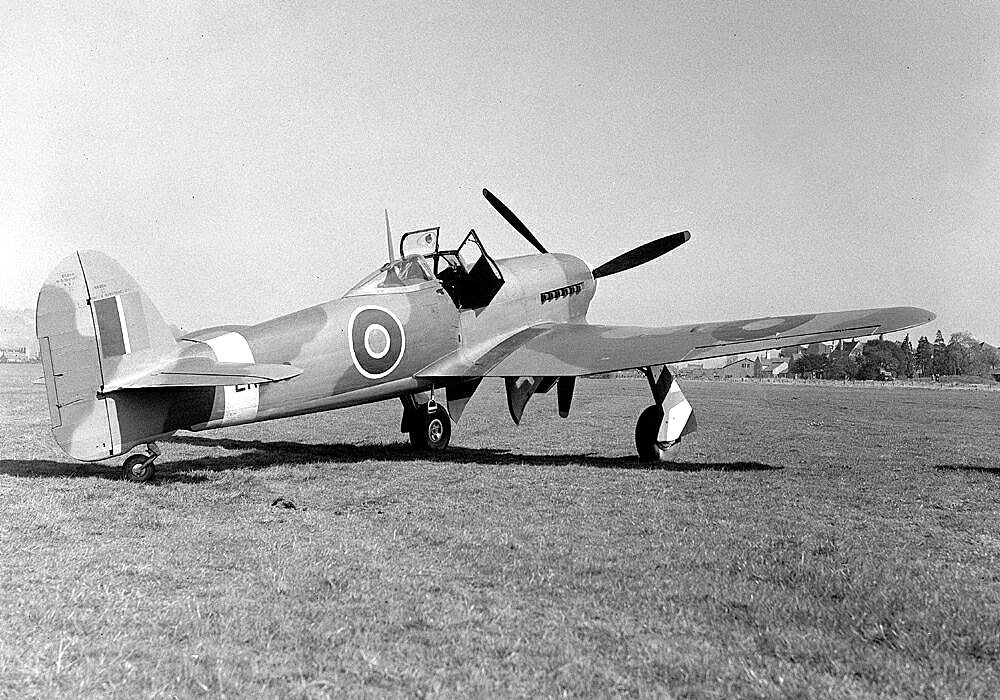
EK286, "Fiji V" a brand-new aircraft, at Hucclecote airfield, April 1943 with the cockpit "car-door" open. The construction of the aircraft was sponsored by the Morris Hedstrom Fiji company

As was usual with many front line Second World War RAF aircraft, the Typhoon was modified and updated regularly, so that a 1945 production example looked quite different from one built in 1941. In the last months of the war, a number of older aircraft were taken out of storage and overhauled, sometimes seeing active service for the first time; for example, R7771 was from one of the first production batches, built in 1942 with the car-door canopy and other early production features. This Typhoon was delivered to, and served on the Fighter Interception Unit in 1942. In February 1945 R7771 was listed as being in front line service on 182 Sqn.; by then it was fitted with a clear-view "bubble" hood, rocket rails and other late series features. (Note: R7771 is listed as being shot down by flak on 28 February 1945. W/O F. W. Cuthbertson was killed.)

=== Carbon monoxide seepage ===
The first problem encountered with the Typhoon after its entry into service was the seepage of carbon monoxide fumes into the cockpit. In an attempt to alleviate this, longer exhaust stubs were fitted in November 1941 ("Mod [modification] 239"), and at about the same time the port (left) cockpit doors were sealed. The Pilot's Notes for the Typhoon recommended that "Unless Mod. No. 239 has been embodied it is most important that oxygen be used at all times as a precaution against carbon monoxide poisoning." Despite the modifications, the problem was never entirely solved, and the standard procedure throughout the war was for Typhoon pilots to use oxygen from engine start-up to engine shut down. In addition to carbon monoxide seepage, pilots were experiencing unpleasantly high cockpit temperatures; eventually a ventilation tube helped alleviate, but did not solve the problem. In addition two small, rear opening vents were added below the port side radio hatch, just below the canopy. (Note: In April 1943, F/L A. O. Moffet of the RAE Farnborough was attached to 486(NZ) Sqn in response to complaints about the overheated cockpits of the Typhoons. For a fortnight, "Moff" flew operationally with the unit. His tests showed that the cockpit temperatures could reach 135 °F (57 °C).)

=== Tail ===
A major problem, afflicting early production Typhoons in particular, was a series of structural failures leading to loss of the entire tail sections of some aircraft, mainly during high-speed dives. Eventually a combination of factors was identified, including harmonic vibration, which could quickly lead to metal fatigue, and a weak transport joint just forward of the horizontal tail unit. The loss of the tailplane of R7692 (having only 11 hours of flight recorded) on 11 August 1942, in the hands of an experienced test pilot (Seth-Smith), caused a major reassessment which concluded that the failure of the bracket holding the elevator mass balance bell crank linkage had allowed unrestrained flutter which led to structural failure of the fuselage at the transport joint.

Starting in September 1942, a steel strap was fitted internally across the rear fuselage transport joint, although this was soon superseded by Mod 286 (modification number 286), in which 20 alloy "fishplates" were riveted externally across the rear fuselage transport joint, while internally some of the rear fuselage frames were strengthened. This was a permanent measure designed to stop rear fuselage structural failures and was introduced on the production line from the 820th aircraft; between December 1942 and March 1943, all Typhoons without Mod 286 were taken out of service and modified. Modified balance weight assemblies were fitted from May 1943. Finally the entire unit was replaced with a redesigned assembly from August 1944.

Although these modifications reduced the numbers of Typhoons being lost due to tail assembly failure, towards the end of the Typhoon's life there were more tail failures, this time caused by a change to the undercarriage latch mechanism in late 1944; in high-speed flight the undercarriage fairings were pulled into the slipstream, creating an uneven airflow over the elevators and rudder resulting in tailplane and then rear fuselage structural failure. In total 25 aircraft were lost and 23 pilots killed due to tail failures.

=== Canopy ===
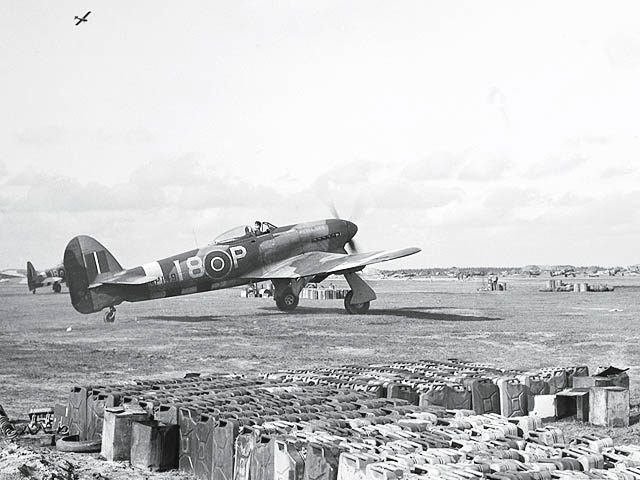
Late model Typhoon of 440 (RCAF) Squadron. Rows of five-gallon jerrycans dominate the foreground

The Typhoon was first produced with forward-opening "car door" style (Note: Another aircraft with this sort of door was the Bell P-39 Airacobra) cockpit doors (complete with wind-down windows), with a transparent "roof" hinged to open to the left. The first 162 Typhoons featured a built-up metal-skinned dorsal fairing behind the pilot's armoured headrest; the mast for the radio aerial protruded through the fairing. From mid- to late 1941 the solid metal aft dorsal fairing was replaced with a transparent structure (later nicknamed "The Coffin Hood"), the pilot's head armour plate was modified to a triangular shape and the side cut-outs were fitted with armoured glass; the first production Typhoon to be fitted with this new structure was R7803. All earlier aircraft were quickly withdrawn and modified. From early 1942 a rear-view mirror was mounted in a perspex blister moulded into the later "car-door" canopy roofs. This modification was not very successful, because the mirror was subject to vibration. Despite the new canopy structure, the pilot's visibility was still restricted by the heavy frames and the clutter of equipment under the rear canopy; from August 1943, as an interim measure, pending the introduction of the new "bubble" canopy and cut-down dorsal fairing, the aerial mast and its associated bracing was removed and replaced with a whip aerial further back on the rear fuselage.

Starting in January 1943, R8809 was used to test a new, clear, one piece sliding "bubble" canopy and its associated new windscreen structure which had slimmer frames which, together with the "cut-down" rear dorsal fairing, provided a far superior all-around field of view to the car-door type. From November 1943 all production aircraft, starting with JR333, were to be so fitted. However, the complex modifications required to the fuselage and a long lead time for new components to reach the production line meant that it took some time before the new canopy became standard. In order to have as many Typhoons of 2nd TAF fitted before "Operation Overlord" as possible, conversion kits were produced and used by Gloster, Hawker and Cunliffe-Owen to modify older Typhoons still fitted with the car-door canopy. (Note: It is believed that the first modified Typhoon was R8843 DJ-S, flown by New Zealander Wing Commander Desmond J. Scott, C/O of the Tangmere Wing from September 1943.)

=== Long-range fighter and fighter-bomber ===
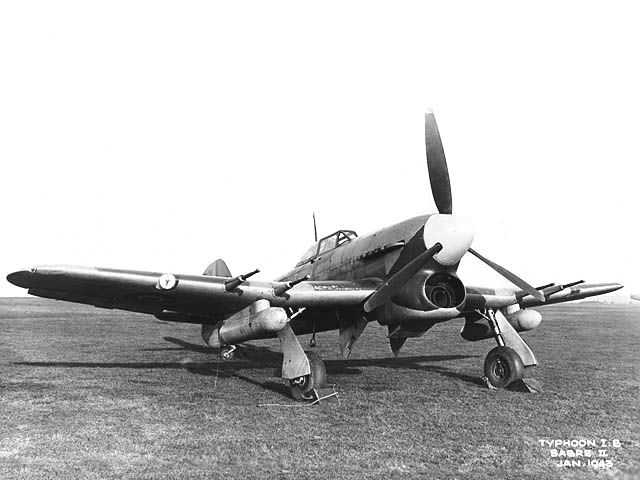
Early production Typhoon with 45-gallon drop tanks and unfaired cannon; the shallow gull shape of the wing can be seen in this view.

From early 1943 the wings were plumbed and adapted to carry cylindrical 45 imp gal (200 L; 54 US gal) drop tanks, (Note: These same drop tanks used by the Hurricane from 1940.) increasing the Typhoon's range from 690 nautical miles (1,280 km) to up to 1,090 nautical miles (2,020 km). This enabled Typhoons to range deep into France, the Netherlands and Belgium. Some units, such as 609 Squadron and 198 Squadron, were able to achieve notable success in air combat and ground attack operations using these long-range Typhoons.

As production continued, the Typhoon's role changed from a low-level interceptor fighter to a fighter bomber. Racks capable of carrying 500-pound (230 kg) bombs were fitted to the wings from October 1942 and were first used operationally by 181 Squadron. By mid-1943, all Typhoons off the production line were capable of carrying bombs. Bigger, solid rubber, grooved "anti-shimmy" tail wheel tyres were introduced in March 1943 on all Typhoons from the 1,001st production aircraft, EK238. The new tyres helped to make heavier, bomb-laden Typhoons more manageable during ground manoeuvres. With the introduction of the bomb racks, small extensions were added to the cannon shell case ejector slots. These allowed the casings to drop clear of bombs or drop tanks suspended from the wing racks. Because of the vulnerability of the Typhoon's liquid-cooled engine cooling system to ground fire, some 780 pounds (350 kg) of armour was added, lining the sides and bottom of the cockpit and engine compartments, as well as the radiator bath.

With the added weight of the bombs and armour, bigger brake discs were fitted to the main wheels. At first this only applied to "Bombphoons", but eventually all Typhoons used these brakes. After tests conducted in 1943, it was determined that the Typhoon was capable of carrying a 1,000-pound (450 kg) bomb under each wing. With the increased load, it was decided that the extra take-off performance conferred by a four-bladed propeller was an advantage. This led to the adoption of a four-bladed propeller unit (de Havilland or Rotol) from early 1944. Coinciding with the new propeller, it was also decided that the larger tailplanes of the Hawker Tempest were to be fitted when tests showed that they improved the handling characteristics of the Typhoon when carrying 1,000-pound (450 kg) bombs. Problems were experienced with oil seal leaks from the new propeller unit and a growing number of Typhoons were held in Maintenance Units (MUs) awaiting the arrival of new seals from the U.S. Some 200 Typhoons were manufactured with the new Tempest tails and the three-bladed propeller. A modification programme was inaugurated but it took several months before a majority of operational Typhoons had the four-bladed propeller and enlarged tailplane. (Note: Early in its service life, the Typhoon airframe was prone to a high-frequency vibration while in flight, such that pilots reported that touching the cockpit walls was akin to receiving a mild electric shock. Although not dangerous, it was uncomfortable, and a specially sprung seat was designed and fitted. With the introduction of the four-bladed propeller and larger tailplane it was found that not only was the performance and handling of the Typhoon enhanced, the vibration was much reduced.)

In June 1943, Hawker fitted a Typhoon with four steel "Mark I" rocket rails under each wing. Trials at the Aeroplane and Armament Experimental Establishment (A & AEE) and Air Fighting Development Unit (AFDU) showed that the combination of the RP-3 rocket and the stable, high-speed platform of the Typhoon was promising. Carrying the eight rails and rockets, it was found that the top speed was reduced by 38 mph (61 km/h), with no adverse handling effects. As a result, the Mk I rails and RP-3s were first fitted to production aircraft of 181 Squadron in October 1943. At first attempts were made to arm Typhoons with either bombs or rockets depending on requirements but it was soon decided that squadrons would specialise. By D-Day, the 2nd TAF was able to field 11 RP ("Rockphoon") Typhoon squadrons and seven "Bombphoon" squadrons.

Later in 1944, attempts were made to increase the firepower by "double banking" rockets on each rail, enabling the Typhoon to carry 16 rockets. The problems involved in operating Typhoons from 2nd TAF airstrips meant that this was not much used, although some Typhoons did fly operationally with 12 rockets, using double-banked rockets on the inner rails. When extra range was required, Typhoons could also operate carrying a drop tank and two rockets outboard of the tank under each wing. From December 1944, aluminium "Mark III" rails, which weighed 240 pounds (110 kg) per set, replaced the steel Mk Is, which weighed 480 pounds (220 kg). (Note: Starting in June 1944, new production Typhoons had the landing light in the leading edge of the port wing, although most units of 2 TAF omitted this feature and faired over the opening with a metal panel, giving the appearance that all production Typhoons were manufactured without the lights.)

In late 1943, Mk III IFF replaced the Mk I and the tailplane tip to fuselage Identification friend or foe (IFF) aerials were replaced by a "bayonet" aerial under the wing's centre section. A Beam Approach Beacon System (Rebecca) transponder unit was fitted in 1944, with the associated aerial appearing under the centre section.

Once Typhoons started operating from forward landing grounds in Normandy, it was found that the dust clouds stirred up by propeller wash consisted of over 80 percent of hard, abrasive material which was damaging the Sabre engines. The sleeve valves in particular were subject to excessive wear and it was calculated that engines would last for three take-offs. As a result, a "dome deflector" was designed and manufactured at great speed by Napier, and within a week most Typhoons had been fitted with it. In operational service these mushroom-shaped air filters, which became red hot, had a propensity for being blown off the air intake at high speed whenever a Sabre engine backfired. They were soon replaced by drum-shaped filters designed by the RAE and Vokes. These had "cuckoo clock" doors in front, which swung open with the pressure changes caused by engine backfires. This standardised filter became Typhoon Mod.420.

At the end of June 1944, a decision was taken to fit tropical air filters as standard, similar to those fitted to the three Typhoons which had been sent to North Africa in 1943. One thousand sets of the filters were to be manufactured and fitted to front line Typhoons as Mod. 421. It was estimated that these could be fitted to all Typhoons on the production lines by the end of September. Research shows that late Typhoons starting in the RB--- series were fitted with the filters, as were some rebuilt aircraft from earlier production batches. Mod. 421 appeared as a streamlined rectangular "hump", just behind the main radiator fairing and between the inner wheel doors, where the updraught carburettor intake was located.

A small, elongated oval static port appeared on the rear starboard fuselage in late 1944. This was apparently used to more accurately measure the aircraft's altitude.

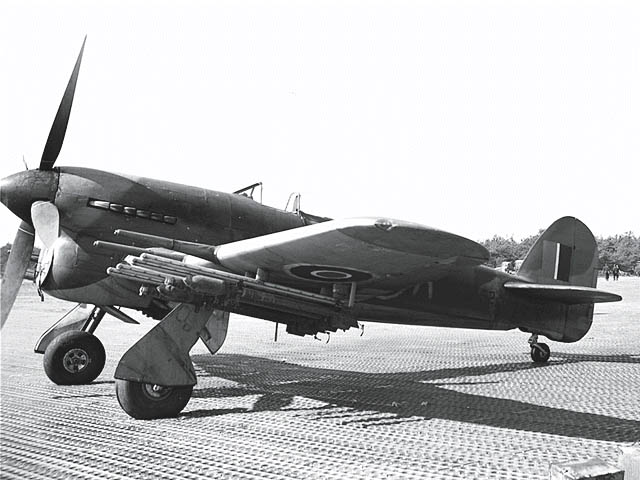
A late production Typhoon with full RP-3 armament, a mix of SAP/HE 60 lb warheads and HE fragmentation head.

One Typhoon, R8694, was used by Napier for trials with the more powerful Sabre IV, cooled using an annular radiator and driving a four-bladed propeller. The new engine and radiator arrangement required substantial modifications to the forward fuselage and engine bearer structures. Although a maximum speed of 452 mph (727 km/h) was claimed by Napier, it was decided that the modifications would not be worthwhile, mainly because of the promising development of the Tempest, and because the disruption to Typhoon production would not be sufficiently outweighed by any benefit achieved.

=== Sub-variants ===
In 1943, one Typhoon, R7881 was converted to a prototype night fighter (N.F. Mk. IB), fitted with aircraft interception radar (A.I.) equipment, a special night-flying cockpit and other modifications. Also in 1943, five Typhoons (Note: R8889, R8891, R8925, DN323 and EJ906) were modified to "Tropical" standard by fitting of an air filter in a fairing behind the main radiator housing. Three (Note: R8891, DN323 and EJ906) underwent trials in Egypt with No. 451 Squadron RAAF, during 1943.

The Typhoon FR IB was developed in early 1944 and was used as a tactical reconnaissance fighter. In this version the port inner cannon was removed and three (one forward-facing 14-inch (360 mm) and two vertical five-inch) F24 cameras were carried in its place. (Note: Pilots soon discovered that the aircraft yawed to the left when the cannon were fired because the recoil of the two cannon on the starboard wing was not properly balanced by the single cannon to port; as a result the starboard inner cannon was also removed from some aircraft.) Few FR IBs were built, and most served with 268 Squadron, starting in July 1944. The aircraft was never popular with the pilots, who preferred the older Mustang Is and IAs, and the inherent engine and airframe vibrations meant that photos were invariably blurred. As a consequence of these problems, the FR IB was phased out in January 1945..

=== Naval designs ===
In 1941, as Blackburn's specification N.11/40 high performance base defence fighter (that was carrier transportable) was delayed, the Admiralty looked at navalised version of the Typhoon as an alternative. The Hawker P.1009 design modified for the purpose had a new centre section, extending the wingspan to over 45 ft (14 m), and thus increasing the wing area; the wings themselves were to be folding units, which swung and folded parallel to the fuselage, with the leading edges pointing upwards, much as did the Grumman F6F Hellcat. The rear fuselage was to be longer and a v-style arrestor hook and associated catapult-launching gear was to be fitted. However it was not thought that the redesign and production would be any faster than proceeding with the N.11/40 and the Hawker "Sea Typhoon" submission was not taken up. The N.11/40, after changes to its role and Centaurus engine replacing the Sabre entered service postwar as the Blackburn Firebrand.

A Typhoon (DW419) was later allocated for carrier trials when the idea for using Typhoons (or Tempests) as carrier aircraft due to their stronger construction over the Seafires then in use came up in November 1942. DW419 crashed in February 1943; by December the view was that the Typhoon was not suited to carrier use due to long take-off run and high stall speed.

== Flight characteristics ==
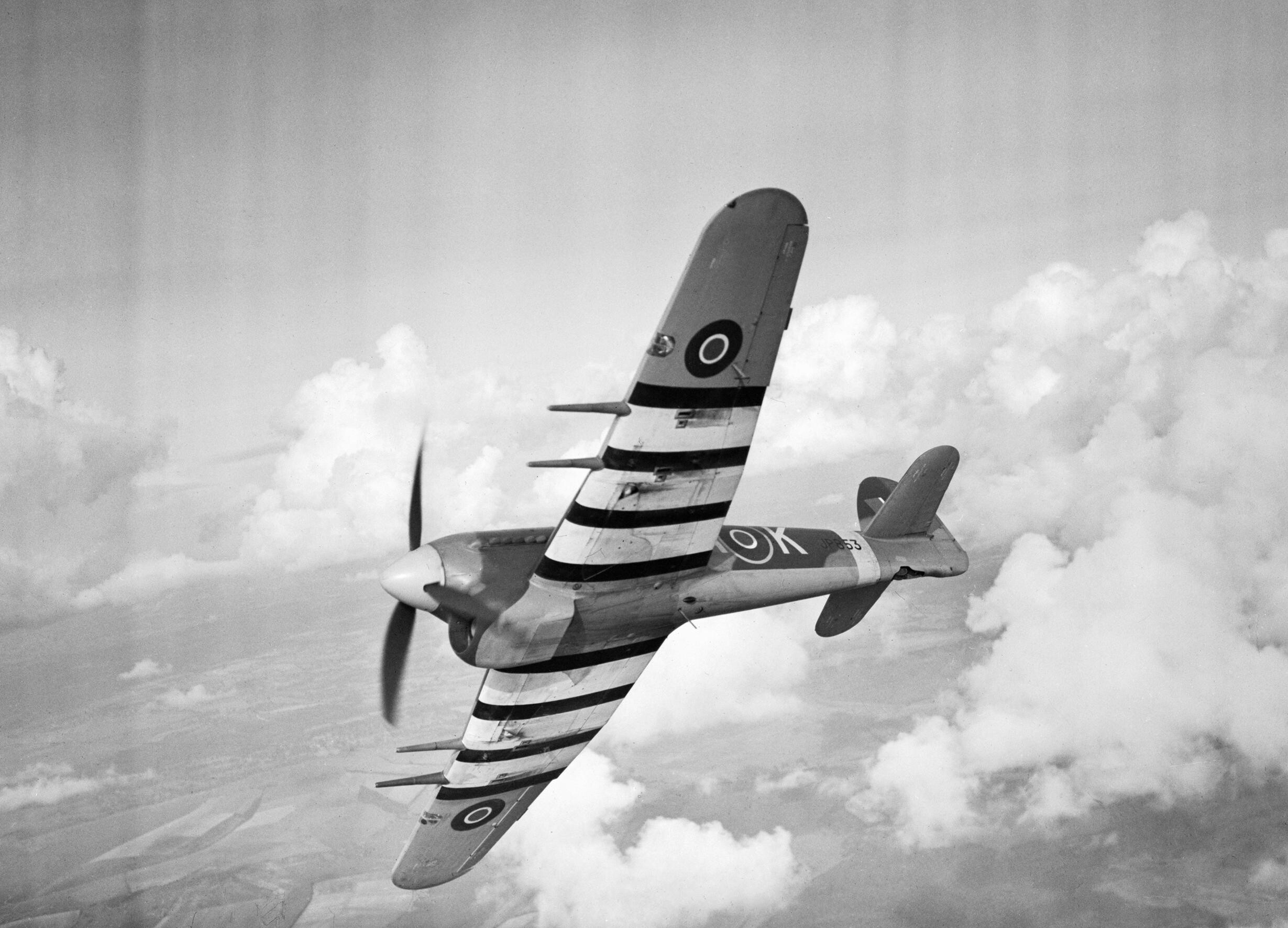
Hawker Typhoon Mk IB of No. 486 (NZ) Squadron in flight, in 1943

Flight Lieutenant Ken Trott flew Typhoons with 197 Squadron and recalled:

Rather a large aircraft shall we say, for a single-engine fighter. Terrific power. Quite something to control. I liked it from the point of view of speed and being a very stable gun platform. You could come in on a target at 400 mph [640 km/h] and the thing was as steady as a rock.

In early March 1943, at Tangmere, the then new Squadron Leader of 486 (NZ) Squadron, Des Scott, flew a Typhoon for the first time:

She roared, screamed, groaned and whined, but apart from being rather heavy on the controls at high speeds she came through her tests with flying colours ... Applying a few degrees of flap we swung on down into the airfield approach, levelled out above the runway and softly eased down on to her two wheels, leaving her tail up until she dropped it of her own accord. We were soon back in her bay by the dispersal hut, where I turned off the petrol supply cock. After a few moments she ran herself out and with a spit, sob and weary sigh, her great three-bladed propeller came to a stop. So that was it: I was drenched in perspiration and tired out...

The performance limitations for speed were noted on the pilot's notes, published by the Air Ministry. Indicated airspeed for diving was set at 525 mph (845 km/h). The Typhoon could, if needed, be flown at 300 mph (480 km/h) with the cockpit "hood" open. Flight with undercarriage and flaps down could be made without incident, at the respective speeds of 210 and 155 mph (338 and 249 km/h). Owing to stability problems, when the aircraft was carrying bombs, the speed could not exceed 400 mph (640 km/h).

Notes for the management of the fuel system stated that indicated airspeeds (IAS) in excess of 380 mph (610 km/h) were not advisable when fitted with auxiliary drop tanks. Tanks were jettisoned at about 200 mph (320 km/h), but in an emergency, a release at 350 mph (560 km/h) was permitted. Tanks were to be ejected in straight and level flight only. General flying ability was positive. The maximum climbing rate was 185 mph (298 km/h) up to 16,000 ft (4,900 m) reducing speed by 3 mph (4.8 km/h) per 1,000 ft (300 m) above this mark. In stability terms, the aircraft was stable "directionally" and "laterally" but slightly unstable longitudinally, except at high speed, when it was just stable. Aileron control was light and effective up to maximum speed, but at very low speed response was sluggish, particularly when carrying ordnance. The elevator control was rather light and should not be used harshly. There was a tendency to "tighten up" in a looping aircraft. If "black out" conditions were accidentally induced in steep turns or aerobatics, the control column was to be pushed forward "firmly".

Stalling speeds were quite low. The typical Typhoon trait, as with most aircraft at the time, was to drop a wing sharply with flaps either up or down. The stalling speeds varied. The various loads depended on external fittings. All-up weight plus two 500 lb (230 kg) bombs (12,155 lb or 5,513 kg in total) with flaps up could induce a stall at 90–100 mph (140–160 km/h). With flaps down, stall was initiated at 70–75 mph (113–121 km/h). Normal all-up weight (11,120 lb or 5,040 kg) would see stall at 80–90 (130–140) and 65–70 mph (105–113 km/h) respectively. With all ammunition and nearly all fuel expended (9,600 lb or 4,400 kg) stall occurred at 75–80 (121–129) and 65–70 mph (105–113 km/h).

== Operators ==
- Australia
- Canada
- New Zealand
- Pakistan
- United Kingdom

== Surviving aircraft ==
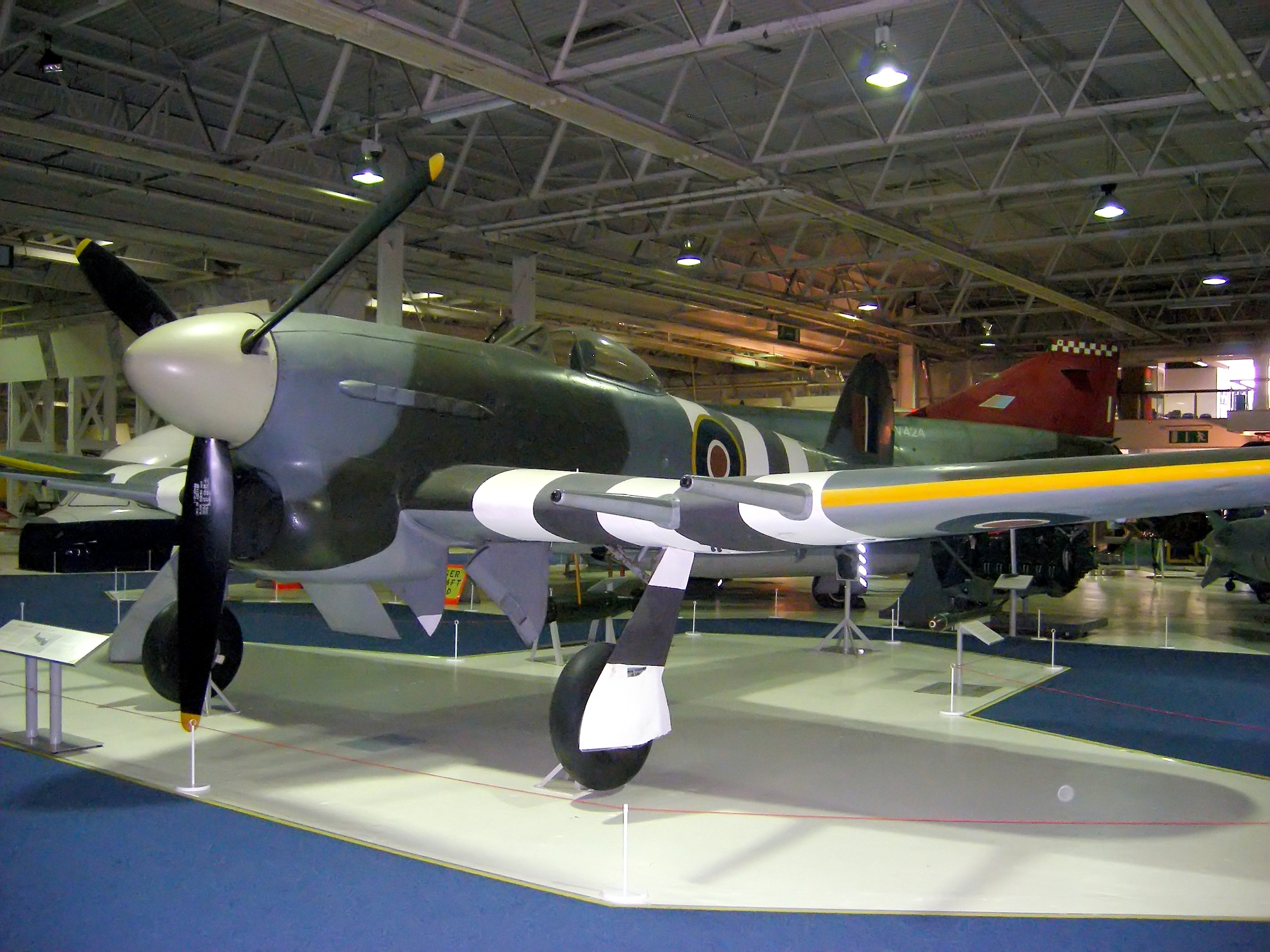
Hawker Typhoon MN235 at the Royal Air Force Museum London; the only surviving Typhoon

Only one complete Hawker Typhoon still survives: serial number MN235. Originally on display at the National Air and Space Museum (part of the Smithsonian Institution) in the United States, it was presented to the Royal Air Force Museum London in Hendon, North London in commemoration of the RAF's 50th Anniversary in exchange for a Hawker Hurricane. The aircraft was on loan to the Canada Aviation and Space Museum in Ottawa, Canada. It was briefly on show in the Battle of Britain Memorial Flight hangar at RAF Coningsby, but returned to the Royal Air Force Museum London in November 2018.

Several other partial airframes are extant:

- Typhoon Ib EJ922, previously privately owned, bought by Hawker Typhoon Preservation Group, UK, for incorporation into RB396.
- Typhoon Ib JP843, Typhoon Legacy Co. Ltd., Canada, undergoing long term airworthy restoration; formerly of the Roger Marley Collection
- Typhoon Ia JR505, Brian Barnes Collection, UK
- Typhoon Ib RB396/G-TIFY, Hawker Typhoon Preservation Group, undergoing airworthy restoration by Airframe Assemblies on the Isle of Wight and the Aircraft Restoration Company at Duxford

An unidentified cockpit section is on display at the Imperial War Museum Duxford, and another – the only known original "car door" example – is subject to a static restoration by the Jet Age Museum in Gloucester.

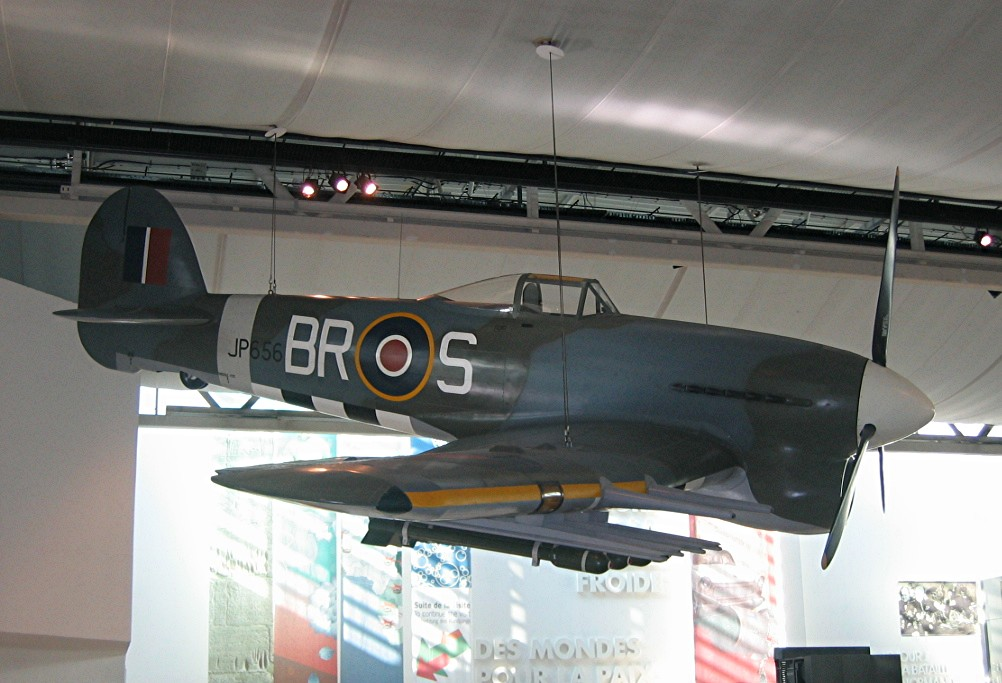
Hawker Typhoon replica on show at the Mémorial de Caen, Normandy

A Hawker Typhoon replica on display at the Mémorial de la Paix at Caen, France, was constructed using some original components.

=== Memorial ===
On 9 June 1994, in recognition of the aircraft and crew's role in the liberation of Normandy, a Typhoon memorial was dedicated by Major M. Roland Heudier at Noyers-Bocage, France. Also present at the ceremony were General Yves Paul Ezanno DFC and bar and Squadron Leader Denis Sweeting, both former Squadron Leaders of No. 198 Squadron RAF.

== Specifications (Typhoon Mk Ib) ==
3-view drawing of Hawker Typhoon

Data from Mason 1991 unless otherwise stated

General characteristics

- Crew: One
- Length: 31 ft 11.5 in (9.741 m) (Note: Late with 4-blade propeller. Early Typhoons were 1.5 in (38 mm) shorter)
- Wingspan: 41 ft 7 in (12.67 m)
- Height: 15 ft 4 in (4.67 m) (Note: Late production; early Typhoons were 14 ft 10 in (4.52 m) high)
- Wing area: 279 sq ft (25.9 m^{2})
- Airfoil: root: NACA 2219; tip: NACA 2213
- Empty weight: 8,840 lb (4,010 kg)
- Gross weight: 11,400 lb (5,171 kg)
- Max takeoff weight: 13,250 lb (6,010 kg) with two 1,000 lb (450 kg) bombs
- Powerplant: 1 × Napier Sabre IIA, IIB or IIC H-24 liquid-cooled sleeve-valve piston engine, 2,180 hp (1,630 kW)

Sabre IIB: 2,200 hp (1,600 kW)
Sabre IIC: 2,260 hp (1,690 kW)

- Propellers: 3 or 4-bladed de Havilland or Rotol constant-speed propeller

Performance

- Maximum speed: 422 mph (679 km/h, 367 kn) at 12,500 ft (3,800 m) with Sabre IIA & 4-bladed propeller (Note: The top speed of the Typhoon was reduced by some 15 mph (24 km/h) by the non-jettisonable rocket rails. Rockets and rails reduced the speed by 38 mph (61 km/h).)
- Stall speed: 88 mph (142 km/h, 76 kn)
- Range: 510 mi (820 km, 440 nmi) with two 500 lb (230 kg) bombs; 690 mi (1,110 km) "clean"; 1,090 mi (1,750 km) with two 45 imp gal (200 L; 54 US gal) drop tanks.
- Service ceiling: 31,800 ft (9,700 m)
- Rate of climb: 2,740 ft/min (13.9 m/s) F.S supercharger at 3,700 rpm and 14,300 ft (4,400 m)
- Wing loading: 40.9 lb/sq ft (200 kg/m^{2})
- Power/mass: 0.20 hp/lb (0.33 kW/kg)

Armament

- Guns: 4 × 20 mm (0.787 in) Hispano Mk II cannon
- Rockets: 8 × RP-3 unguided air-to-ground rockets.
- Bombs: 2 × 500 lb (230 kg) or 2 × 1,000 lb (450 kg) bombs

== See also ==
Related development

- Hawker Hurricane
- Hawker Tornado
- Hawker Tempest
- Hawker Sea Fury

Aircraft of comparable role, configuration, and era

- Focke-Wulf Fw 190
- Republic P-47 Thunderbolt
- Vought F4U Corsair

Related lists

- List of aircraft of the Royal Air Force
- List of aircraft of the United Kingdom in World War II
- List of aircraft of World War II
- De Typhoon, a Dutch newspaper (1944–1992) named for the plane
