= Josef Haiböck =

Austrian general and Luftwaffe fighter pilot during World War II (1917–2002)

- Born: 28 February 1917; Linz, Austria-Hungary
- Died: 3 July 2002 (aged 85); Salzburg, Austria
- Military career
- Allegiance: Federal State of Austria; Nazi Germany (to 1945); Second Austrian Republic
- Branch: Österreichische Luftstreitkräfte (1937–1938); Luftwaffe (1938–1945); Österreichische Luftstreitkräfte (1956–1977)
- Service years: 1937–1945; 1956–1977
- Rank: Hauptmann (Wehrmacht); Generalmajor (Bundesheer)
- Nickname: "Pepsch"
- Units: JG 26, JG 52, JG 3
- Commands: I./JG 3
- Conflicts: World War II; Battle of France; Battle of Britain; Operation Barbarossa; Defense of the Reich
- Awards: Knight's Cross of the Iron Cross

Josef Haiböck (28 February 1917 – 3 July 2002) was a general in the Austrian Air Force. During World War II, he served as a fighter pilot in the Luftwaffe of Nazi Germany and was a recipient of the Knight's Cross of the Iron Cross. Haiböck joined the Austrian Austrian Armed Forces (Bundesheer) in 1956 and retired in 1977 as a Generalmajor. During his career he was credited with 77 aerial victories in 604 missions.

== Early life and career ==
Haiböck was born on 28 February 1917 in Linz in Austria-Hungary. In 1937, he joined the military service of Austrian Air Force. Following the Anschluss in March 1938, the forced incorporation of Austria into Nazi Germany, Haiböck was transferred to the Luftwaffe (the Nazi German Air Force). In 1938, he attended the Theresian Military Academy at Wiener Neustadt and the Luftkriegsschule 2 in Berlin–Gatow.

== World War II ==
World War II in Europe began on Friday 1 September 1939 when German forces invaded Poland. On 1 December 1939, Leutnant Haiböck joined Jagdgeschwader 26 "Schlageter" (JG 26—26th Fighter Wing), which had been named after Albert Leo Schlageter on 1 May 1939. There, he was assigned to 9. Staffel (9th squadron). At the time, the Geschwader was commanded by Oberst Eduard Ritter von Schleich, 9. Staffel by Oberleutnant Gerhard Schöpfel, and III. Gruppe, to which the Staffel was subordinated, was led by Major Ernst Freiherr von Berg. The Gruppe was based at Werl and patrolled western German border during the "Phoney War" without having contact with the enemy. On 1 November, III. Gruppe was ordered to Essen-Mülheim Airfield.

Haiböck claimed his first aerial victory on 29 May during the Battle of Dunkirk against the Royal Air Force (RAF). At 18:10, he shot down a Supermarine Spitfire west of Dunkirk. The Spitfire belonged to either No. 64, No. 229 or No. 610 Squadron. Two days later, he claimed a No. 609 Squadron Spitfire over Dunkirk. He claimed his last and third aerial victory of the Battle of France on 8 June over a Hawker Hurricane.

On 15 August, Haiböck claimed his first aerial victories against the RAF during the Battle of Britain. That day, Luftflotte 2 (Air Fleet 2) sent 88 Dornier Do 17 bombers from Kampfgeschwader 3 (KG 3—3rd Bomber Wing) attacking the Rochester and Eastchurch airfields. JG 26 participated on this mission, flying ahead of the bombers. Later that day, Haiböck claimed a No. 151 Squadron Hurricane shot down near Folkestone on a combat air patrol. On 22 August, the command hierarchy in JG 26 changed. Hauptmann Adolf Galland, who had commanded III. Gruppe, was appointed Geschwaderkommodore (wing commander) of JG 26. In consequence, Schöpfel, who had led 9. Staffel until then, succeeded Galland as Gruppenkommandeur (group commander) of III. Gruppe and Haiböck was transferred to the Gruppenstab, the headquarters unit of III. Gruppe. On 28 August, the Luftwaffe attacked the airfields at Eastchurch and Rochford. In defense of this attack, the RAF dispatched 32 Hurricane fighters and 12 Boulton Paul Defiant interceptor aircraft from No. 264 Squadron. In this encounter, Haiböck was credited with the destruction of a Defiant shot down east of Canterbury.

Haiböck claimed his first aerial victory in 1941 on 17 June. That day, the RAF flew "Circus" No. 14, attacking the Kuhlmann chemical complexes at Chocques near Béthune. Defending against this attack, Haiböck claimed a Spitfire shot down near Saint-Omer which was not confirmed. On 27 September, Haiböck was again flying with 9. Staffel, then under command of Hauptmann Kurt Ruppert. Following combat with Spitfires in the vicinity of Calais, he claimed an aerial victory. That day, the RAF flew two "Circus" missions, No. 103A attacking the Amiens motor yards, and No. 103B, targeting the Mazingarbe power station.

=== Squadron leader ===
On 22 November 1941, Reichsmarschall Hermann Göring informed Galland that he would succeed Oberst Werner Mölders as General der Jagdflieger (General of the Fighter Arm), a staff position with the RLM in Berlin. In consequence of this decision, on 6 December, Schöpfel, Gruppenkommandeur of III. Gruppe was appointed Geschwaderkommodore of JG 26, and Hauptmann Josef Priller was given command of III. Gruppe, and Haiböck was appointed Staffelkapitän (squadron leader) of 1. Staffel.

On 19 August 1942, Allied forces launched Operation Jubilee, the amphibious attack on the German-occupied port of Dieppe in northern France. Defending against this attack, Haiböck led 1. Staffel of JG 26 against the Spitfire fighters protecting the landing fleet. On 28 October, Haiböck received orders that he had been transferred to Jagdgeschwader 52 (JG 52—52nd Fighter Wing) fighting on the Eastern Front. In consequence, command of 1. Staffel of JG 26 was passed on to Oberleutnant Franz Nels. The transfer was delayed and on 8 November, Haiböck claimed his last aerial victory with JG 26 when he shot down a Spitfire fighter 5 kilometers (3.1 miles) north of Gravelines.

=== Eastern Front ===
I./JG 52 insignia

On 30 December 1942, Haiböck officially succeeded Oberleutnant Friedrich Bartels as Staffelkapitän of 1. Staffel of JG 52. The Staffel was subordinated to I. Gruppe of JG 52 which was commanded by Hauptmann Helmut Bennemann. On 6 December, I. Gruppe had moved to an airfield at Rossosh where they stayed until 15 January 1943. Following further relocation, the Gruppe arrived at an airfield near Kursk on 26 January. Here on 29 January, Haiböck claimed his first aerial victories on the Eastern Front when he shot down two Ilyushin Il-2 ground-attack aircraft. On 1 February, Haiböck was shot down in a Messerschmitt Bf 109 G during a strafing attack flown 6 kilometers (3.7 miles) east of Tim. He crash landed his aircraft and returned to his unit.

On 10 February, I. Gruppe moved to Poltava where they stayed until 10 March. Here, Haiböck increased his number of aerial victories claimed to 19 by end-February. Following the German defeat at Stalingrad and Soviet advance in Voronezh–Kharkov offensive, I. Gruppe was moved to Anapa located on the northern coast of the Black Sea near the Sea of Azov on 16 May. Haiböck was awarded the German Cross in Gold (Deutsches Kreuz in Gold) on 17 October 1943.

=== Group commander ===
On 1 December 1943, Major Günther Rall, the Gruppenkommandeur of III. Gruppe of JG 52 was sent on home leave. During his absence, Haiböck temporarily was given command of the Gruppe until Rall's return on 30 January 1944. Behind Major Johannes Wiese and Leutnant Johann-Hermann Meier, Haiböck was the third most successful active fighter pilot of I. Gruppe of JG 52 at the time.

On 8 February 1944, Haiböck was transferred to take command of I. Gruppe of Jagdgeschwader 3 "Udet" (JG 3—3rd Fighter Wing) which was fighting in Defense of the Reich. He replaced Hauptmann Joachim von Wehren who had temporarily led the Gruppe after Major Klaus Quaet-Faslem was killed on 30 January. Command of 1. Staffel of JG 52 was passed to Oberleutnant Karl-Heinz Plücker. On 25 February, Haiböck made a forced landing in his Bf 109 G-6 (Werknummer 410377—factory number) following engine failure near Malsch, district of Karlsruhe. On the ground, he was then attacked by strafing American aircraft and seriously wounded. During his convalescence, he was awarded the Knight's Cross of the Iron Cross (Ritterkreuz des Eisernen Kreuzes) on 9 June 1944. Due to reoccurring medical complication, he remained hospitalized in a Luftwaffe hospital in Bad Ischl until the end of World War II in Europe. In consequence, command of I. Gruppe of JG 3 had been passed on to Hauptmann Helmut Mertens.

== Later life and service ==
In 1956, Haiböck volunteered for military service in the Austrian Air Force, initially holding the rank auf Hauptmann.

Following retirement from military service in 1977, Haiböck became the president of the Austrian Aero Club. In 1986, he opposed the removal of the Alexander Löhr commemorative plaque from the Vienna the garrison church Stiftskirche. Löhr was one of the main creators of the Austrian Air Force and a convicted war criminal. The commemorative plaque had been donated by the Austrian Aero Club in 1955.

Haiböck, who had been living with the widow of his friend Leopold Fellerer, died on 3 July 2002 at the age of 85 in Salzburg, Austria.

== Summary of career ==
=== Aerial victory claims ===
According to US historian David T. Zabecki, Haiböck was credited with 77 aerial victories. Spick also lists him with 77 aerial victories claimed in 604 combat missions. This figure includes 60 aerial victories on the Eastern Front, and further 16 victories over the Western Allies. Mathews and Foreman, authors of Luftwaffe Aces — Biographies and Victory Claims, researched the German Federal Archives and found records for 73 aerial victory claims, plus twelve further unconfirmed claims. This figure of confirmed claims includes 59 aerial victories on the Eastern Front and 14 over the Western Allies.

Victory claims were logged to a map-reference (PQ = Planquadrat), for example "PQ 73652". The Luftwaffe grid map (Jägermeldenetz) covered all of Europe, western Russia and North Africa and was composed of rectangles measuring 15 minutes of latitude by 30 minutes of longitude, an area of about 360 square miles (930 km^{2}). These sectors were then subdivided into 36 smaller units to give a location area 3 km × 4 km (1.9 mi × 2.5 mi) in size.

Chronicle of aerial victories
This and the – (dash) indicates unconfirmed aerial victory claims for which Haiböck did not receive credit. This and the ? (question mark) indicates information discrepancies listed by Barbas, Prien, Stemmer, Rodeike, Bock, Mathews and Foreman.
Claim	Date	Time	Type	Location	Unit	Claim	Date	Time	Type	Location	Unit
– Claims with Jagdgeschwader 26 "Schlageter" – Battle of France — 10 May – 25 June 1940
1	29 May 1940	18:10	Spitfire	west of Dunkirk	9./JG 26	3	8 June 1940	10:30	Hurricane	northwest of Beauvais	9./JG 26
2	31 May 1940	15:40	Spitfire	Dunkirk	9./JG 26						
– Claims with Jagdgeschwader 26 "Schlageter" – Action at the Channel and over England — 26 June 1940 – 21 June 1941
4	15 August 1940	20:25	Hurricane	west of Folkestone	9./JG 26	7	5 December 1940	12:15	Hurricane	west of Hastings	Stab III./JG 26
4	28 August 1940	10:00	Defiant	east of Canterbury; Faversham	Stab III./JG 26	— (Note: This unconfirmed claim is not listed by Prien, Stemmer, Rodeike and Bock.)	5 December 1940	16:00~	Spitfire		Stab III./JG 26
6	3 September 1940	11:05? (Note: According to Mathews and Foreman claimed at 11:10.)	Spitfire	Rochester east of Southend	Stab III./JG 26	—	17 June 1941	20:00	Spitfire	Saint-Omer	Stab III./JG 26
– Claims with Jagdgeschwader 26 "Schlageter" – Action at the Channel and over England — 22 June – 5 December 1941
8	7 August 1941	18:05	Spitfire	Boulogne	Stab III./JG 26	9	27 September 1941	15:40	Spitfire	1 km (0.62 mi) north of Calais	9./JG 26
– Claims with Jagdgeschwader 26 "Schlageter" – Western Front — 1 January – 29 October 1942
10? (Note: According to Mathews and Foreman this claim is unconfirmed.)	12 April 1942	13:50	Spitfire	10 km (6.2 mi) east of Dover	1./JG 26	13	9 May 1942	13:40	Spitfire	2 km (1.2 mi) north of Cassel	1./JG 26
11	27 April 1942	12:14	Spitfire	north of Saint-Omer	1./JG 26	—	29 May 1942	08:30~	Spitfire	middle of the English Channel	1./JG 26
12	27 April 1942	12:14	Spitfire	north of Saint-Omer	1./JG 26	14	2 June 1942	10:55	Spitfire	west of Baie de Somme	1./JG 26
— ?	27 April 1942	13:45~	Spitfire	over sea, north of Dunkirk	1./JG 26	— ?	29 June 1942	16:48	Spitfire	southwest of Dunkirk	1./JG 26
—	5 May 1942	15:30~	Spitfire		1./JG 26	15	8 November 1942	12:30	Spitfire	5 km (3.1 mi) north of Gravelines	1./JG 26
– Claims with Jagdgeschwader 52 – Eastern Front — 30 December 1942 – 3 February 1943
16	29 January 1943	09:50	Il-2 m.H. (Note: The "m.H." refers to an Ilyushin Il-2 with rear gunner (mit Heckschütze).)	PQ 73652; 40 km (25 mi) northeast of Kursk	1./JG 52	17	29 January 1943	10:30	Il-2	PQ 62273	1./JG 52
– Claims with Jagdgeschwader 52 – Eastern Front — 4 February – 31 December 1943
18	28 February 1943	09:19	Il-2	PQ 35 Ost 40422 east of Poltava	1./JG 52	47	22 August 1943	08:50	Yak-1	PQ 35 Ost 70873; 15 km (9.3 mi) northwest of Krasnyi Lyman	1./JG 52
19	28 February 1943	09:21	Il-2	PQ 35 Ost 40483 east of Poltava	1./JG 52	48	24 August 1943	12:05	La-5	PQ 34 Ost 79114; 10 km (6.2 mi) northeast of Barvinkove	1./JG 52
20	19 March 1943	14:30	LaGG-3	PQ 35 Ost 71871; 40 km (25 mi) east-southeast of Bely Kolodez	1./JG 52	49	24 August 1943	14:37	Yak-1	PQ 35 Ost 70796; 20 km (12 mi) southeast of Izium	1./JG 52
21	19 March 1943	09:15	LaGG-3	PQ 34 Ost 75422 northeast of Novorossiysk	1./JG 52	50	25 August 1943	17:21	La-5	PQ 34 Ost 79123, southwest of Dolynska vicinity of Dolynska	1./JG 52
22	26 April 1943	17:27? (Note: According to Mathews and Foreman claimed at 07:27.)	P-39	PQ 34 Ost 86744 vicinity of Trojzkaja	1./JG 52	51	26 August 1943	17:45	Yak-1	PQ 35 Ost 70799; 20 km (12 mi) southeast of Izium	1./JG 52
23	27 April 1943	18:05	Yak-1	PQ 34 Ost 85111, Krymskaya vicinity of Krasshyj Golubowski	1./JG 52	52	9 September 1943	17:05	Yak-1	PQ 34 Ost 85144 vicinity of Abinsk	1./JG 52
24	27 April 1943	18:07	Yak-1	PQ 34 Ost 85113, 15 km (9.3 mi) north of Krymskaya	1./JG 52	53	14 September 1943	15:40	Il-2 m.H.	PQ 34 Ost 76882 vicinity of Kesselerowo	1./JG 52
25	5 July 1943	09:20	Pe-2	PQ 35 Ost 61321; 15 km (9.3 mi) south of Krasnyi Lyman	1./JG 52	54	14 September 1943	15:50	Il-2 m.H.	PQ 34 Ost 76766 south of Bolschoj Rasnokol	1./JG 52
26	5 July 1943	18:30	Il-2 m.H.	PQ 35 Ost 61624, southeast of Belgorod; 20 km (12 mi) southeast of Belgorod	1./JG 52	55	18 September 1943	10:14	LaGG-3	PQ 34 Ost 76563 over sea, north of Temryuk	1./JG 52
27	5 July 1943	18:33	Il-2 m.H.	PQ 35 Ost 61621, 12 km (7.5 mi) southwest of Belgorod; 12 km (7.5 mi) southeast of Belgorod	1./JG 52	56	19 September 1943	15:33	Yak-1	PQ 34 Ost 76792 south of Starotitarovskaya	1./JG 52
28	9 July 1943	10:58	Il-2	PQ 35 Ost 62786, east of Belgorod; 20 km (12 mi) south of Oboyan	1./JG 52	57	20 September 1943	12:32	LaGG-3	PQ 34 Ost 76872 south of Kolonka	1./JG 52
29	18 July 1943	15:16	Yak-1	PQ 34 Ost 88262 vicinity of Jalisawehino	1./JG 52	58	21 September 1943	15:32	LaGG-3	PQ 34 Ost 76812 west of Kalabatka	1./JG 52
30	19 July 1943	16:10	Yak-1	PQ 34 Ost 88267, east of Marinowka vicinity of Jalisawehino	1./JG 52	59	23 September 1943	17:15	Il-2	PQ 34 Ost 76734 southwest of Kurtschanskaja	1./JG 52
31	20 July 1943	18:26	Il-2 m.H.	PQ 34 Ost 88294; 15 km (9.3 mi) east of Jalisawehino	1./JG 52	60	24 September 1943	09:59	LaGG-3	PQ 34 Ost 66864 vicinity of Wennlowka	1./JG 52
32	22 July 1943	15:23	Il-2 m.H.	PQ 34 Ost 88259 vicinity of Dmitrijewka	1./JG 52	— (Note: This unconfirmed claim is not listed by Mathews and Foreman.)	24 September 1943	—	Il-2		1./JG 52
33	1 August 1943	11:16	Il-2 m.H.	PQ 34 Ost 88252, southwest of Stepanowka; 25 km (16 mi) east-northeast of Kuteinykove	1./JG 52	61	2 October 1943	15:40	Yak-1	PQ 34 Ost 76771 vicinity of Kossa Goljak	1./JG 52
34	7 August 1943	15:16	La-5	PQ 35 Ost 61595, north of Leskij; 30 km (19 mi) south-southwest of Belgorod	1./JG 52	62	3 October 1943	15:45	Il-2 m.H.	PQ 34 Ost 66662 west of Saporoshskaja	1./JG 52
35	7 August 1943	17:41	Il-2 m.H.	PQ 35 Ost 61326; 10 km (6.2 mi) south of Krasnyi Lyman	1./JG 52	63	7 October 1943	08:16	LaGG-3	PQ 34 Ost 66684 over sea, north of Tamanj	1./JG 52
36	7 August 1943	17:55	Il-2 m.H.	PQ 35 Ost 61477; 5 km (3.1 mi) south of Belgorod	1./JG 52	64	13 October 1943	15:45? (Note: According to Mathews and Foreman claimed at 15:15.)	La-5	PQ 34 Ost 58212; 30 km (19 mi) northeast of Zaporizhzhia	1./JG 52
37	8 August 1943	05:55	La-5? (Note: According to Mathews and Foreman claimed as a Yakovlev Yak-1.)	PQ 34 Ost 80824; 15 km (9.3 mi) southwest of Starobelsk	1./JG 52	65	22 October 1943	11:30	LaGG-3	PQ 34 Ost 58734; 20 km (12 mi) west of Bolschoj Tokmak	1./JG 52
38	11 August 1943	09:07	La-5?	PQ 35 Ost 61592, north of Leskij; 30 km (19 mi) south-southwest of Belgorod	1./JG 52	66	23 October 1943	11:00	Yak-1	PQ 34 Ost 39662, 16 km (9.9 mi) east of Pjatichatki	1./JG 52
39	11 August 1943	09:17	Yak-1? (Note: According to Mathews and Foreman claimed as a Douglas A-20 Havoc.)	PQ 35 Ost 51721 north of Krasnokutsk	1./JG 52	67	24 October 1943	07:00	Yak-1	PQ 34 Ost 58692; 15 km (9.3 mi) west-northwest of Bolschoj Tokmak	1./JG 52
40	14 August 1943	11:17	Yak-1	PQ 35 Ost 51738; 10 km (6.2 mi) northwest of Bogoduchow	1./JG 52	68	28 October 1943	09:23	Yak-1	PQ 34 Ost 48834 vicinity of Beloserka	1./JG 52
41	16 August 1943	11:20	La-5	PQ 35 Ost 70769; 15 km (9.3 mi) southeast of Izium	1./JG 52	69	29 October 1943	11:50	Yak-1	PQ 34 Ost 47471; 5 km (3.1 mi) north of Ivanovka	1./JG 52
42	17 August 1943	14:07	Yak-1	PQ 35 Ost 70766; 15 km (9.3 mi) southeast of Izium	1./JG 52	70	12 November 1943	07:10	Yak-1	PQ 34 Ost 66814 vicinity of Krotkow	1./JG 52
43	17 August 1943	17:30	Yak-1	PQ 34 Ost 88221, 1 km (0.62 mi) west of Rerowka	1./JG 52	71	12 November 1943	10:48	Yak-1	PQ 34 Ost 66592, 1 km (0.62 mi) south of Kerch southeast of Kerch	1./JG 52
44	18 August 1943	18:39	Il-2	PQ 34 Ost 88227 west of Stepanowka	1./JG 52	72	28 November 1943	10:30	La-5	PQ 34 Ost 39331; 10 km (6.2 mi) northeast of Mironowka	1./JG 52
45	20 August 1943	11:03	P-39	PQ 34 Ost 88291; 15 km (9.3 mi) east of Jalisawehino	1./JG 52	—	7 December 1943	—	Yak-9	vicinity of Kryvyi Rih	Stab III./JG 52
46	20 August 1943	16:50	Yak-1	PQ 34 Ost 88299, south-southeast of Kalinowka; 15 km (9.3 mi) east of Jalisawehino	1./JG 52	73	19 December 1943	—	LaGG-3	west of Bolshaya Belozerka; Bol-Bilanka	Stab III./JG 52
—	21 August 1943	—	Yak-1	vicinity of Mius	1./JG 52						
– Claims with Jagdgeschwader 52 – Eastern Front — 1 January – 7 February 1944
— (Note: This unconfirmed claim is not listed by Barbas.)	3 January 1944	—	Yak-1	Kryvyi Rih	Stab III./JG 52	—	30 January 1944	—	P-39	Kropyvnytskyi	Stab III./JG 52
74	6 January 1944	11:30	P-39? (Note: According to Mathews and Foreman claimed as a Ilyushin Il-2.)	northeast of Nowgorod	Stab III./JG 52						
– Claims with Jagdgeschwader 3 "Udet" – Defense of the Reich — 8 – 25 February 1944
— (Note: This unconfirmed claim is listed as his 75th aerial victory in the 2002 book by Prien and Stemmer.)	24 February 1944	—	P-47	vicinity of Cochem/Mosel	Stab I./JG 3						

=== Awards and decorations ===
- Iron Cross (1939) 2nd and 1st Class
- German Cross in Gold on 17 October 1943 as Hauptmann in the 1./Jagdgeschwader 52
- Knight's Cross of the Iron Cross on 9 June 1944 as Hauptmann and Gruppenkommandeur of the I./Jagdgeschwader 3 "Udet" (Note: According to Scherzer as Gruppenkommandeur of the I./Jagdgeschwader 3 "Udet" [for his achievements as Staffelkapitän in the I./Jagdgeschwader 52].)
- Decoration of Honour for Services to the Republic of Austria in Gold

== Notes ==
Military offices
Preceded by Hauptmann Joachim von Wehren	Commander of I./JG 3; 8 February 1944 – 25 February 1944	Succeeded by Major Dr. Langer
