= Johann-Hermann Meier =

German fighter ace and Knight's Cross recipient

- Born: 10 June 1921; Kronprinzenkoog
- Died: 15 March 1944 (aged 22); Florennes, Belgium
- Burial place: Lommel, Belgium (Block 5—grave 427)
- Military career
- Allegiance: Nazi Germany
- Branch: Luftwaffe
- Rank: Leutnant (second lieutenant)
- Units: JG 52, JG 26
- Commands: 3./JG 52, 1./JG 26
- Conflicts: World War II: Eastern Front; Defence of the Reich
- Awards: Knight's Cross of the Iron Cross

Johann-Hermann Meier (10 June 1921 – 15 March 1944) was a German Luftwaffe military aviator during World War II, a fighter ace credited with 77 enemy aircraft shot down in 305 combat missions. All of his victories were claimed over the Eastern Front.

On 15 March 1944, Meier was killed in a takeoff accident after his Focke-Wulf Fw 190 collided with another Fw 190 while taxiing at the Luftwaffe base in Florennes, Belgium. He was posthumously awarded the Knight's Cross of the Iron Cross on 16 December 1944.

== Early life and career ==
Meier was born on 10 June 1921 in Kronprinzenkoog, at the time in the Province of Schleswig-Holstein within the Weimar Republic. He joined the military of service of the Luftwaffe and following flight and fighter pilot training in October 1942, (Note: Flight training in the Luftwaffe progressed through the levels A1, A2 and B1, B2, referred to as A/B flight training. A training included theoretical and practical training in aerobatics, navigation, long-distance flights and dead-stick landings. The B courses included high-altitude flights, instrument flights, night landings and training to handle the aircraft in difficult situations.) Meier was posted to 1. Staffel (1st squadron) of Jagdgeschwader 52 (JG 52—52nd Fighter Wing) fighting on the Eastern Front. The Staffel was subordinated to I. Gruppe (1st group) and had moved to Pitomnik Airfield, approximately 15 kilometers (9.3 miles) west of Stalingrad, on 22 September. At the time, his commanding officer of 1. Staffel was Oberleutnant Friedrich Bartels while the Gruppe was headed by Hauptmann Helmut Bennemann.

== World War II ==
World War II in Europe had begun on Friday 1 September 1939 when German forces invaded Poland. On 6 December 1942, II. Gruppe of JG 52 had reached an airfield at Rossosh on the Eastern Front. Here on 18 December, Meier claimed his first aerial victory when he shot down an Ilyushin Il-2 ground-attack aircraft. Meier claimed his second aerial victory almost one and a half month later. The Gruppe had moved to an airfield at Kursk on 26 January 1943. Here on 1 February 1943, Meier claimed another Il-2 ground-attack aircraft destroyed.

I./JG 52 insignia

The Gruppe was moved to the combat area of the Kuban bridgehead on 5 April 1943 where it was based at an airfield at Taman where Meier claimed his third aerial victory on 28 April, a Yakovlev Yak-1 fighter. Following the German defeat at Stalingrad and Soviet advance in Voronezh–Kharkov offensive, I. Gruppe was moved to Anapa located on the northern coast of the Black Sea near the Sea of Azov on 16 May. For his achievements as a fighter pilot, Meier was awarded the both classes of the Iron Cross (Eisernes Kreuz).

On 10 June 1943, the Staffelkapitän (squadron leader) of 3. Staffel of JG 52 was killed in action. In consequence, Meier was transferred from 1. Staffel and temporarily given command of 3. Staffel until Hauptmann Erich Schreiber assumed command on 15 July. In preparation for Operation Citadel, I. Gruppe was moved to Bessonovka, a makeshift airfield located approximately 20 kilometers (12 miles) on 4 July. The next during the Battle of Kursk, Meier became an "ace-in-a-day", claiming six Soviet aircraft shot down. Among his six claims of the day were three Il-2 ground-attack aircraft from the 17th Air Army (17 Vozdushnaya Armiya—17-я воздушная армия) shot down after 18:20. On 7 July, Meier claimed a Lavochkin La-5 fighter followed by another Il-2 ground-attack aircraft two days later. Meier was awarded the Honor Goblet of the Luftwaffe (Ehrenpokal der Luftwaffe) on 31 August.

On 2 September, I. Gruppe moved to an airfield at Stalino, present-day Donetsk. Here on 5 September, Meier shot down two Il-2 ground-attack aircraft. By end September 1943, Meier had increased his number of aerial victories claimed to 45, which placed him third in I. Gruppe behind Hauptmann Josef Haiböck and Oberleutnant Paul-Heinrich Dähne at the time. Meier was awarded the German Cross in Gold (Deutsches Kreuz in Gold) on 27 October. On 7 December, I. Gruppe moved to an airfield at Mala Vyska where they stayed until 3 January 1944. Here, Meier claimed his 66th aerial victory on 17 December, a Bell P-39 Airacobra fighter, making him fifth most successful active fighter pilot of the Gruppe at the time. In January 1944, Meier claimed eleven further aerial victories, increasing his total to 77 by 17 January. This 77th aerial victory over an Il-2 ground-attack was also his last and made him the second most successful fighter pilot of I. Gruppe after Major Johannes Wiese at the time.

=== With Jagdgeschwader 26 "Schlageter" and death ===
Meier was transferred to I. Gruppe of Jagdgeschwader 26 "Schlageter" (JG 26–26th Fighter Wing) in February 1944 fighting on the Western Front flying the Focke-Wulf Fw 190 fighter. At the time, the Gruppe was based at Florennes Airfield and commanded by Hauptmann Karl Borris. There, Meier was appointed Staffelkapitän of 1. Staffel on 29 February. He replaced Leutnant Leberecht Altmann who was transferred.

On 15 March, the United States Army Air Forces attacked Braunschweig with a force of Boeing B-17 Flying Fortress and Consolidated B-24 Liberator bombers. Defending against this attack, I. and II. Gruppe of JG 26 was scrambled. During takeoff, Meier in his Fw 190 A-6 (Werknummer 470057–factory number) collided with his wingman Unteroffizier Hans Ruppert. Both aircraft caught fire, while Ruppert escaped, Meier was killed in the accident. According to an eyewitness report, Meier was drunk at the time. For his 77 aerial victories claimed with JG 52, Meier was awarded a posthumous Knight's Cross of the Iron Cross (Ritterkreuz des Eisernen Kreuzes). Meier was succeeded by Oberleutnant Kurt Kranefeld as Staffelkapitän of 1. Staffel. He is buried at the Lommel German war cemetery (Block 21—grave 290).

== Summary of career ==
=== Aerial victory claims ===
According to US historian David T. Zabecki, Meier was credited with 77 aerial victories. Spick also lists him with 77 aerial victories, 76 of which on the Eastern Front and one on the Western Front, claimed in 305 combat missions. Mathews and Foreman, authors of Luftwaffe Aces: Biographies and Victory Claims, researched the German Federal Archives and found records for 76 aerial victory claims, all of which were claimed on the Eastern Front.

Victory claims were logged to a map-reference (PQ = Planquadrat), for example "PQ 62322". The Luftwaffe grid map (Jägermeldenetz) covered all of Europe, western Russia and North Africa and was composed of rectangles measuring 15 minutes of latitude by 30 minutes of longitude, an area of about 360 square miles (930 km^{2}). These sectors were then subdivided into 36 smaller units to give a location area 3 km × 4 km (1.9 mi × 2.5 mi) in size.

Chronicle of aerial victories
This and the ♠ (Ace of spades) indicates those aerial victories which made Meier an "ace-in-a-day", a term which designates a fighter pilot who has shot down five or more airplanes in a single day. This and the ? (question mark) indicates information discrepancies listed by Prien, Stemmer, Rodeike, Balke, Bock, Mathews and Foreman.
Claim	Date	Time	Type	Location	Claim	Date	Time	Type	Location
– 1. Staffel of Jagdgeschwader 52 – Eastern Front — December 1942 – 3 February 1943
1? (Note: This claim is not listed by Mathews and Foreman.)	18 December 1942	14:10	Il-2		2	1 February 1943	09:00	Il-2	PQ 62322 vicinity of Kursk
– 1. Staffel of Jagdgeschwader 52 – Eastern Front — 4 February – 31 December 1943
3	28 April 1943	10:45	Yak-1	PQ 34 Ost 85281 vicinity of Smolenskaya	27	5 September 1943	07:28	Il-2 m.H. (Note: The "m.H." refers to an Ilyushin Il-2 with rear gunner (mit Heckschütze).)	PQ 34 Ost 65253 over sea, south of Taman
4	14 May 1943	17:25	La-5	PQ 35 Ost 61222; 10 km (6.2 mi) east of Prokhorovka	28	9 September 1943	16:34	Il-2 m.H.	PQ 34 Ost 76883 vicinity of Akkermanka
5	14 May 1943	17:37? (Note: According to Mathews and Foreman claimed at 17:34.)	La-5	PQ 35 Ost 61276, 25 km (16 mi) north of Belgorod; 20 km (12 mi) north-northeast of Belograd	29	13 September 1943	14:15	Il-2 m.H.	PQ 34 Ost 76351 northeast of Varenikovskaya
6	26 May 1943	05:11	Spitfire	PQ 34 Ost 76887 vicinity of Kesselerowo	30	14 September 1943	11:14	Boston	PQ 34 Ost 75393 over sea, southeast of Anapa
7	26 May 1943	09:45	P-39	PQ 34 Ost 76853 vicinity of Kolonka	31	14 September 1943	11:46	Boston	PQ 34 Ost 76613 vicinity of Sswisteljnikoff
8	29 May 1943	09:45	Yak-1	PQ 34 Ost 85112, 8 km (5.0 mi) northeast of Krymskaja north of Mertschanskaja	32	20 September 1943	15:47	Yak-1	PQ 34 Ost 75483 vicinity of Gaiduk
9	4 June 1943	05:55	La-5	PQ 34 Ost 85112, 12 km (7.5 mi) northeast of Krymskaja north of Mertschanskaja	33	21 September 1943	12:55	Il-2 m.H.	PQ 34 Ost 66882 over sea, south of Taman
10	5 June 1943	18:25	Il-2 m.H.	PQ 34 Ost 75236, north of Krymskaja north of Mertschanskaja	34	21 September 1943	16:37	Il-2 m.H.	PQ 34 Ost 76772 vicinity of Blagoweschtschenskaja
11	5 June 1943	18:32	Il-2 m.H.	PQ 34 Ost 75262, west of Krymskaja vicinity of Warenikowskaja	35	22 September 1943	07:10	Pe-2	PQ 34 Ost 66842 southwest of Taman
12	6 June 1943	18:10	Il-2 m.H.	PQ 34 Ost 76682, 12 km (7.5 mi) northeast of Kurtschannoje vicinity of Sswisteljnikoff	36	22 September 1943	09:44	P-39	PQ 34 Ost 76813 south of Kurtschanskaja
13	8 June 1943	16:01	Il-2 m.H.	PQ 34 Ost 76821, east of Kalabatka vicinity of Kalabatka	37	22 September 1943	16:37	Yak-1	PQ 34 Ost 76642 northeast of Temryuk
14	14 June 1943	06:35	P-39	PQ 34 Ost 76674 east of Temryuk	38	23 September 1943	07:45	Yak-1	PQ 34 Ost 76273; Gostagdiewskaja
15	16 June 1943	09:12	P-39	PQ 34 Ost 75454; Black Sea, 10 km (6.2 mi) south of Novorossiysk	? (Note: This claim is not listed by Prien, Stemmer, Rodeike and Bock.)	23 September 1943	07:51	Il-2	south of Starotitarovskaya
16	16 June 1943	09:16	P-39	PQ 34 Ost 75494; Black Sea, 10 km (6.2 mi) southwest of Gelendzhik	?	23 September 1943	07:51	Il-2	over sea, west of Blagoweschtschenskaja
17	16 June 1943	19:06	Yak-1	PQ 34 Ost 75492; Black Sea, 10 km (6.2 mi) west of Gelendzhik	39	24 September 1943	12:51	Yak-1	PQ 34 Ost 76782 vicinity of Ssuworowsko-Tscherkeskij
18♠	5 July 1943	05:53	La-5	PQ 35 Ost 61151; 10 km (6.2 mi) north of Krasnyi Lyman	40	25 September 1943	12:45	P-39	PQ 34 Ost 66893 over sea, south of Wennlowka
19♠	5 July 1943	09:10	La-5	PQ 35 Ost 51234; 25 km (16 mi) northwest of Krasnyi Lyman	41	26 September 1943	12:45	LaGG-3	PQ 34 Ost 76354; Sea of Azov
20♠	5 July 1943	09:23	La-5	PQ 35 Ost 61132; 10 km (6.2 mi) west of Prokhorovka	42	27 September 1943	11:47	Yak-1	PQ 34 Ost 76593 east of Temryuk
21♠	5 July 1943	18:27	Il-2	PQ 35 Ost 61481, vicinity of Belgorod; 15 km (9.3 mi) southeast of Belograd	43	27 September 1943	14:12	Il-2 m.H.	PQ 34 Ost 76714; Black Sea, 75 km (47 mi) west-southwest of Gelendzhik
22♠	5 July 1943	18:29	Il-2 m.H.	PQ 35 Ost 61613, vicinity of Belgorod; 15 km (9.3 mi) south of Belograd	44?	29 September 1943	07:58	Il-2 m.H.	PQ 34 Ost 76742
23♠	5 July 1943	18:34	Il-2 m.H.	PQ 35 Ost 61484, vicinity of Belgorod; 15 km (9.3 mi) southeast of Belograd	45?	29 September 1943	08:04	Il-2	PQ 34 Ost 75712
24	7 July 1943	18:27	La-5	PQ 35 Ost 61152; 10 km (6.2 mi) north of Krasnyi Lyman	46	2 October 1943	09:30	Yak-1	PQ 34 Ost 76723 east of Starotitarovskaya
25	9 July 1943	10:56	Il-m.H.	PQ 34 Ost 62786, east of Belgorod; 20 km (12 mi) south of Oboyan	47	2 October 1943	15:24	LaGG-3	PQ 34 Ost 76714 south of Starotitarovskaya
26	5 September 1943	07:27	Il-2 m.H.	PQ 34 Ost 66893 over sea, south of Wennlowka	48	3 October 1943	12:10	Yak-1	PQ 34 Ost 76584 west of Temryuk
– 3. Staffel of Jagdgeschwader 52 – Eastern Front — 4 February 1943 – 31 December 1943
49	14 October 1943	11:56	Yak-1	PQ 34 Ost 58154, south of Zaporizhzhia northeast of Zaporizhzhia	58	27 October 1943	07:28	P-39	PQ 34 Ost 48884; 20 km (12 mi) south-southwest of Bilozerka
50	20 October 1943	14:09	Il-2 m.H.	PQ 34 Ost 58173; 5 km (3.1 mi) southwest of Zaporizhzhia	59	27 October 1943	07:30	P-39	PQ 34 Ost 48893; 20 km (12 mi) south of Bilozerka
51	20 October 1943	14:13	Il-2 m.H.	PQ 34 Ost 58181; 5 km (3.1 mi) southeast of Zaporizhzhia	60	30 October 1943	06:47	Yak-9	PQ 34 Ost 47361; 15 km (9.3 mi) west-southwest of Ivanovka
52	23 October 1943	09:05	P-39	PQ 34 Ost 58561 vicinity of Kalinówka	61	5 November 1943	09:25	Il-2 m.H.	PQ 34 Ost 37872; 15 km (9.3 mi) southwest of Perekop
53	23 October 1943	12:42	La-5	PQ 34 Ost 59751; 35 km (22 mi) north-northeast of Zaporizhzhia	62	10 November 1943	14:51	Il-2 m.H.	PQ 34 Ost 37842; 10 km (6.2 mi) southwest of Perekop
54	23 October 1943	12:49	La-5	PQ 34 Ost 59751; 35 km (22 mi) north-northeast of Zaporizhzhia	63	29 November 1943	07:03	P-39	PQ 34 Ost 39344; 10 km (6.2 mi) south of Alexandrija
55	24 October 1943	06:26	La-5	PQ 34 Ost 59742; 30 km (19 mi) north of Zaporizhzhia	64	29 November 1943	07:06	P-39	PQ 34 Ost 39174; 10 km (6.2 mi) north of Alexandrija
56	24 October 1943	06:29	La-5	PQ 34 Ost 59744; 20 km (12 mi) south of Grishino	65	29 November 1943	14:21	La-5	PQ 34 Ost 29294; 20 km (12 mi) northwest of Alexandrija
57	25 October 1943	15:02	Yak-9	PQ 34 Ost 57152; 3 km (1.9 mi) northwest of Melitopol	66	17 December 1943	14:15	P-39	west of Dubiyevka
– 3. Staffel of Jagdgeschwader 52 – Eastern Front — January 1944
67	6 January 1944	11:50	P-39	PQ 34 Ost 29354; 10 km (6.2 mi) north of Kirovograd	73	15 January 1944	10:05	Yak-9	PQ 34 Ost 29342; 15 km (9.3 mi) northwest of Kirovograd
68	6 January 1944	12:07	Yak-1? (Note: According to Mathews and Foreman claimed as a Yakovlev Yak-9.)	PQ 34 Ost 29331 vicinity of Fewal	74	16 January 1944	09:30	Yak-9	PQ 34 Ost 19461; 24 km (15 mi) west-northwest of Kirovograd
69	7 January 1944	14:15	Yak-9	PQ 34 Ost 29391; 10 km (6.2 mi) east of Kirovograd	75	16 January 1944	11:50	P-39	PQ 34 Ost 29392; 10 km (6.2 mi) east of Kirovograd
70	11 January 1944	13:16	Yak-9	PQ 34 Ost 29541; 20 km (12 mi) south-southwest of Kirovograd	76	16 January 1944	11:52	P-39	PQ 34 Ost 19492; 25 km (16 mi) west of Kirovograd
71	11 January 1944	13:17	Yak-9	PQ 34 Ost 29543; 20 km (12 mi) south-southwest of Kirovograd	77	17 January 1944	14:36	Il-2 m.H.	PQ 34 Ost 29512, southeast of Gruskoje; 10 km (6.2 mi) west of Aleksandrovka
72	12 January 1944	11:02	P-39	PQ 34 Ost 29374; 15 km (9.3 mi) west of Kirovograd					

=== Awards ===
- Iron Cross (1939) 2nd and 1st Class
- Honor Goblet of the Luftwaffe on 13 September 1941 as Leutnant and pilot (Note: According to Obermaier on 31 August 1943.)
- German Cross in Gold on 27 October 1943 as Leutnant in the I./Jagdgeschwader 52
- Knight's Cross of the Iron Cross on 16 December 1944 as Leutnant and Staffelführer of the 1./Jagdgeschwader 26 "Schlageter" (Note: According to Scherzer as Staffelführer in the I./Jagdgeschwader 52.)
