= Helmut Mertens =

German fighter ace and Knight's Cross recipient

- Born: 11 November 1917; Essen, Kingdom of Prussia
- Died: 17 January 1984 (aged 66); Usingen, West Germany
- Military career
- Allegiance: Nazi Germany
- Branch: Luftwaffe
- Service years: 1937–1943
- Rank: Hauptmann
- Nickname: Pitt
- Units: LG 2, JG 3
- Conflicts: World War II: Eastern Front; Battle of France; Battle of Britain; Operation Barbarossa; Western Front; Defence of the Reich
- Awards: Knight's Cross of the Iron Cross; German Cross in Gold

Helmut Mertens (also known as "Pitt") (11 November 1917 – 17 January 1984) was a German fighter ace of World War II. He was born in Essen and served in the Luftwaffe as a career fighter pilot who served in the Battle of France, Battle of Britain, the invasion of Russia Operation Barbarossa and on the Western Front in the Defence of the Reich. His victory tally as a fighter pilot is reported as high as ninety-seven or as few as fifty-four aircraft confirmed shot down.

== Career ==
Mertens was born on 11 November 1917 in Essen in the Rhine Province of the German Empire. He joined the Luftwaffe (German Air Force) in 1937. By the outbreak of war on 1 September 1939, Mertens had been commissioned as Leutnant and was a fighter pilot flying the Messerschmitt Bf 109 with I. (Jagd) Gruppe of Lehrgeschwader 2 LG 2. With this unit he participated in Operation Case Yellow during the Battle of France and on 19 May 1940, shot down a Royal Air Force Hurricane fighter his first combat victory. On 3 June 1940, he shot down a French Curtiss fighter his second victory. Mertens transferred to Jagdgeschwader 3 flying with their 9. Staffel (squadron) in the Battle of Britain. His unit provided escort cover for German bombers attacking England and on 26 October 1940, he shot down another Hawker Hurricane fighter.

== Eastern Front ==
During Operation Barbarossa, Mertens shot down DB-3 bomber on 26 June 1941, and then during July 1941 he shot down eleven more Soviet aircraft including three in a day on 16 July 1941. He was awarded the Iron Cross 1st Class. On 23 July 1941, Oberleutnant Viktor Bauer, the Staffelkapitän (squadron commander) of 9. Staffel, was injured in a landing accident. In consequence, Mertens was appointed acting commander, a position he held until 6 November. Mertens shot down seven more aircraft in August 1941, one more in September, and another in October 1941.

In February 1942, Mertens transferred to the Staff of Jagdgeschwader 3 and was promoted Oberleutnant before joining the staff of III. Gruppe of Jagdgeschwader 3. He was awarded the German Cross in gold on 27 May 1942, or 8 June 1942. Between 6 April 1942, and 26 July 1942, he shot down fifteen more Russian aircraft, primarily Lavochkin-Gorbunov-Gudkov LaGG-3 and Polikarpov I-153 fighters and Ilyushin DB-3 bombers, bringing his tally to forty confirmed victories.

In late July 1942, Mertens was appointed to command the 1. Staffel (squadron) of Jagdgeschwader 3 and promptly shot down seven more Russian fighters and bombers during the next four weeks. A photograph in Luftwaffe Rudder Markings 1936-45 taken on 22 July 1942, in the Stalingrad sector shows him posing with the tail of his Bf 109 which is marked with forty-seven victory tabs. He was awarded the Knight’s Cross of the Iron Cross on 4 September 1942, the recommendation at the time stated that he had achieved fifty victories in air combat.

On 2 October, he was temporarily appointed Gruppenkommandeur (group commander) of I. Gruppe of JG 3, replacing Hauptmann Klaus Quaet-Faslem until 2 November 1942. Documentation concerning Mertens service in the next eight or nine months from the time of his award until July 1943 is scarce and no details of his actions as a fighter pilot are known.

== Western Front ==
By July 1943 he was back in action flying with 1 Staffel Jagdgeschwader 3 on the Western Front flying in the Defence of the Reich against the daylight attacks on German home targets primarily by 8th USAAF formations. On 30 July 1943, he shot down a B-17Flying Fortress and on 17 August 1943, another B-17 Flying Fortress.

On 23 September 1943, Mertens was appointed commander of 4. Staffel of Ergänzungs-Jagdgruppe Ost (Training Fighter Wing – East) to complete the operational training phase for young pilots arriving from fighter pilot school Jagdfliegerschule. He was promoted Hauptmann on 1 October 1943, and on 8 January 1944, returned to fully operational duties when he was appointed to command the 7. Staffel of JG 3. On 20 February 1944, Mertens made a ramming attack on a Consolidated B-24 Liberator bomber. In this attack, his Bf 109 G-6 (Werknummer 161358—factory number) crashed near Andernach, he was wounded, and bailed out. He was replaced by Leutnant Erwin Stahlberg as commander of 7. Staffel.

While recovering, Mertens was briefly appointed to command 1. Staffel of Ergänzungs-Jagdgruppe Ost (Training Fighter Wing – East) in April 1944 until he assumed temporary command of I Gruppe Jagdgeschwader 3 and then joined the staff of Adolf Galland General of Fighter pilots. From November 1944 Mertens held posts within Ergänzungs-Jagdgruppe Ost (Training Fighter Wing – East) and finally the operational training establishment of Jagdgeschwader 1.

== Summary of career ==
=== Aerial victory claims ===
According to Obermaier, he was credited with about 750 combat missions and 54 confirmed air victories and the sinking of a Russian gun boat. Obermaier records sixty victories in the East and between sixteen on the Western Front, including three four-engined bombers. Spick lists him with 97 aerial victories. Mathews and Foreman, authors of Luftwaffe Aces — Biographies and Victory Claims, researched the German Federal Archives and state that he was credited with at least 49 aerial victories, plus two further unconfirmed claims. This figure of confirmed claims includes at least 45 aerial victories on the Eastern Front and four on the Western Front, including two four-engined bombers.

=== Awards ===
- Aviator badge (1938)
- Front Flying Clasp of the Luftwaffe in Gold
- Iron Cross (1939)
  - 2nd Class (awarded late 1940)
  - 1st Class (awarded July 1941)
- German Cross in Gold on 27 May 1942 as Oberleutnant in the III./Jagdgeschwader 3. (Note: According to Scheibert on 8 June 1942.)
- Knight’s Cross of the Iron Cross on 4 September 1942 as Oberleutnant and pilot in I./Jagdgeschwader 3 "Udet".

== Bibliography ==
- Fellgiebel, Walther-Peer [in German] (2000) [1986]. Die Träger des Ritterkreuzes des Eisernen Kreuzes 1939–1945 — Die Inhaber der höchsten Auszeichnung des Zweiten Weltkrieges aller Wehrmachtteile [The Bearers of the Knight's Cross of the Iron Cross 1939–1945 — The Owners of the Highest Award of the Second World War of all Wehrmacht Branches] (in German). Friedberg, Germany: Podzun-Pallas. ISBN 978-3-7909-0284-6.
- Bf 109 Defence of the Reich Aces. Osprey Publishing. 2006. ISBN 1841768790.
- Ries, Karl (1991). Luftwaffe Rudder Markings 1936-45. Schiffer Publishing. ISBN 0-88740-337-9.
- Mathews, Andrew Johannes; Foreman, John (2015). Luftwaffe Aces — Biographies and Victory Claims — Volume 3 M–R. Walton on Thames: Red Kite. ISBN 978-1-906592-20-2.
- Obermaier, Ernst (1989). Die Ritterkreuzträger der Luftwaffe Jagdflieger 1939 – 1945 [The Knight's Cross Bearers of the Luftwaffe Fighter Force 1939 – 1945] (in German). Mainz, Germany: Verlag Dieter Hoffmann. ISBN 978-3-87341-065-7.
- Patzwall, Klaus D.; Scherzer, Veit (2001). Das Deutsche Kreuz 1941 – 1945 Geschichte und Inhaber Band II [The German Cross 1941 – 1945 History and Recipients Volume 2] (in German). Norderstedt, Germany: Verlag Klaus D. Patzwall. ISBN 978-3-931533-45-8.
- Prien, Jochen; Stemmer, Gerhard (1996). Messerschmitt Bf 109 im Einsatz bei der III./Jagdgeschwader 3 in 1940 – 1945 [Messerschmitt Bf 109 in Action with the III./Jagdgeschwader 3 in 1940 – 1945] (in German). Eutin, Germany: Struve-Druck. ISBN 978-3-923457-33-5.
- Prien, Jochen; Stemmer, Gerhard; Rodeike, Peter; Bock, Winfried (2003). Die Jagdfliegerverbände der Deutschen Luftwaffe 1934 bis 1945—Teil 6/I—Unternehmen "BARBAROSSA"—Einsatz im Osten—22.6. bis 5.12.1941 [The Fighter Units of the German Air Force 1934 to 1945—Part 6/I—Operation "BARBAROSSA"—Action in the East—22 June to 5 December 1941] (in German). Eutin, Germany: Struve-Druck. ISBN 978-3-923457-69-4.
- Prien, Jochen; Stemmer, Gerhard; Rodeike, Peter; Bock, Winfried (2006). Die Jagdfliegerverbände der Deutschen Luftwaffe 1934 bis 1945—Teil 9/II—Vom Sommerfeldzug 1942 bis zur Niederlage von Stalingrad—1.5.1942 bis 3.2.1943 [The Fighter Units of the German Air Force 1934 to 1945—Part 9/II—From the 1942 Summer Campaign to the Defeat at Stalingrad—1 May 1942 to 3 February 1943] (in German). Eutin, Germany: Struve-Druck. ISBN 978-3-923457-77-9.
- Colonel R F Toliver and T J Constable (1982). Horrido. Fighter Aces of the Luftwaffe. Bantam War Books.
- Scherzer, Veit (2007). Die Ritterkreuzträger 1939–1945 Die Inhaber des Ritterkreuzes des Eisernen Kreuzes 1939 von Heer, Luftwaffe, Kriegsmarine, Waffen-SS, Volkssturm sowie mit Deutschland verbündeter Streitkräfte nach den Unterlagen des Bundesarchives [The Knight's Cross Bearers 1939–1945 The Holders of the Knight's Cross of the Iron Cross 1939 by Army, Air Force, Navy, Waffen-SS, Volkssturm and Allied Forces with Germany According to the Documents of the Federal Archives] (in German). Jena, Germany: Scherzers Militaer-Verlag. ISBN 978-3-938845-17-2.
- Scheibert, Horst (1984). Die Trager des Deutschen Kreuzes in Gold: Kriegsmarine, Luftwaffe, Waffen-SS; und, Des Deutschen Kreuzes in Silber : Heer, Kriegsmarine, Luftwaffen, Waffen-SS (German ed.). Podzun-Pallas-Verlag. p. 297. ISBN 3-7909-0223-3.
- Spick, Mike (1996). Luftwaffe Fighter Aces. New York: Ivy Books. ISBN 978-0-8041-1696-1.
- John Weal (2007). More Bf 109 Aces of the Russian Front. Osprey Publishing. ISBN 978-1-84603-177-9.
- Weal, John (2013). Aces of Jagdgeschwader 3 'Udet'. Aircraft of the Aces. Vol. 116. Oxford, UK: Osprey Publishing. ISBN 978-1-78096-298-6.
