= Viktor Bauer =

German World War II flying ace (1915–1969)

- Bauer as an Oberleutnant
- Born: 15 September 1915; Löcknitz, Germany
- Died: 13 December 1969 (aged 54); Bad Homburg, Germany
- Military career
- Allegiance: Nazi Germany
- Branch: Luftwaffe
- Service years: 1935–1945
- Rank: Oberst (colonel)
- Unit: JG 77
- Commands: 9./JG 3
- Conflicts: See battles World War II: Battle of Britain; Eastern Front; Operation Barbarossa; Demyansk Pocket; Battle of Kalach
- Awards: Knight's Cross of the Iron Cross with Oak Leaves

Viktor Bauer (15 September 1915 – 13 December 1969) was a former Luftwaffe fighter ace and recipient of the Knight's Cross of the Iron Cross with Oak Leaves during World War II. A flying ace or fighter ace is a military aviator credited with shooting down five or more enemy aircraft during aerial combat. Bauer is credited with 106 aerial victories, achieved in over 400 combat missions, all but four claimed on the Eastern Front. He was "ace-in-a-day" four times, shooting down five or more aircraft on a single day.

== Early life and career ==
Bauer was born on 19 September 1915 in Löcknitz, the son of a landowner. He joined the military service on 1 April 1935, initially serving in Infanterie-Regiment 1 (1st Infantry Regiment). He served in the Reichsarbeitsdienst (Reich Labour Service) from 1 January 1936 until 31 March 1936. He transferred to the Luftwaffe of the Nazi Germany on 6 April 1936 as a Fahnenjunker (cadet). Bauer completed his flight training on 1 March 1938. (Note: Flight training in the Luftwaffe progressed through the levels A1, A2 and B1, B2, referred to as A/B flight training. A training included theoretical and practical training in aerobatics, navigation, long-distance flights and dead-stick landings. The B courses included high-altitude flights, instrument flights, night landings and training to handle the aircraft in difficult situations.) That day, he was also promoted to Leutnant (second lieutenant) and transferred to Kampfgeschwader 138 (KG 138–138th Bomber Wing). On 1 May 1938, he attended a Jagdfliegerschule (fighter pilot school). On 1 July 1938, Bauer was assigned to the VI. Gruppe (4th group) of Jagdgeschwader 132 "Richthofen" (JG 132–132nd Fighter Wing) as a fighter pilot. (Note: For an explanation of the meaning of Luftwaffe unit designation see Organization of the Luftwaffe during World War II.) On 9 March 1939, he was posted to I. Gruppe (1st group) of Jagdgeschwader 331 (JG 331–331st Fighter Wing) and to I. Gruppe of Jagdgeschwader 77 (JG 77–77th Fighter Wing) on 31 July 1939.

== World War II ==
World War II in Europe had begun on Friday, 1 September 1939, when German forces invaded Poland. On 1 November, he received the Iron Cross 2nd Class (Eisernes Kreuz 2. Klasse). On 1 March 1940, he was transferred to the 2. Staffel of JG 77. Bauer claimed his first aerial victory on 15 May 1940 west of Bruges, a Royal Air Force (RAF) Hawker Hurricane. He shot down another Hurricane near Cambrai on 18 May. Bauer was promoted to Oberleutnant (first lieutenant) on 1 June 1940 and was awarded the Iron Cross 1st Class (Eisernes Kreuz 1. Klasse) on 18 November 1940. He then fought in the Battle of Britain against the RAF, claiming a Supermarine Spitfire shot down on 1 November 1940. Bauer was awarded the Iron Cross 1st Class (Eisernes Kreuz 1. Klasse) on 18 November 1940, and then transferred to Jagdgeschwader 3 (JG 3–3rd Fighter Wing) in November 1940.

On 15 February 1941, III. Gruppe was withdrawn from the English Channel and relocated to Gütersloh Airfield for a period of rest and replenishment. Bauer and other pilots of III. Gruppe spent a couple of days of R&R skiing in the Kleinwalsertal before returning for active service on 17 March. On 17 April, the Gruppe received the then new Messerschmitt Bf 109 F-2, training on this type until they relocated to Lillers, France on 3 May. On 10 June 1941, Bauer was appointed Staffelkapitän (squadron leader) of 9. Staffel (9th squadron) of JG 3, succeeding Oberleutnant Max Jaczak who killed in a flying accident the day before.

=== Eastern Front ===
The Wehrmacht launched Operation Barbarossa, the invasion of the Soviet Union, on 22 June 1941. III. Gruppe supported Army Group South in its strategic goal towards the heavily populated and agricultural heartland of Ukraine, taking Kiev before continuing eastward over the steppes of southern USSR to the Volga with the aim of controlling the oil-rich Caucasus. In June 1941, Bauer claimed 15 Soviet aircraft shot down, including five SB-2 twin-engine bombers claimed on 26 June alone. He then claimed 17 victories in July, including five Russian DB-3 twin-engine bombers on 12 July.

On 23 July 1941, Bauer claimed two Polikarpov I-153 biplane fighters shot down, taking his to total to 36 aerial victories. That afternoon, his Bf 109 F-2 (Werknummer 8987—factory number) sustained heavy damage in combat with a flight of Ilyushin DB-3 bombers at the Dnieper. Bauer attempted a forced landing at Bila Tserkva, the aircraft somersaulted, resulting in heavy injuries to Bauer. During his convalescence, he was awarded the Knight's Cross of the Iron Cross (Ritterkreuz des Eisernes Kreuzes) on 30 July 1941 for 34 aerial victories. During his absence, Leutnant Helmut Mertens served as acting Staffelkapitän of 9. Staffel. Bauer returned to his unit in February 1942.

At the time of his return to front line service, III. Gruppe of JG 3 had been redeployed to an area of operations north of Lake Ilmen in support of the airlift resupplying German forces in the Demyansk Pocket. There, on 18 February 1942, Bauer claimed two Mikoyan-Gurevich MiG-3 fighter aircraft, taking his total to 40 aerial victories. In combat with 6 Udarnaya Aviatsionnaya Gruppa (6 UAG—6th Soviet Strike Aviation Group) on 4 April, he claimed his 50th aerial victory, a Lavochkin-Gorbunov-Gudkov LaGG-3 fighter. On 19 May, Bauer claimed a 429 Istrebitel'nyy Aviatsionyy Polk (429 IAP—429th Fighter Aviation Regiment) MiG-3. On 22 June 1942, Bauer was awarded the Honor Goblet of the Luftwaffe (Ehrenpokal der Luftwaffe).

On 5 July 1942 during the Battle of Voronezh, Bauer claimed four aerial victories, increasing his total to 74. On 26 July, he received the Knight's Cross of the Iron Cross with Oak Leaves (Ritterkreuz des Eisernes Kreuzes mit Eichenlaub) for 102 aerial victories. He was the 14th Luftwaffe pilot to achieve the century mark. Bauer and together with Oberleutnant Erwin Clausen were presented the Oak Leaves by Adolf Hitler at the Führerhauptquartier at Rastenburg.

On 9 August, he claimed his 106th victory. On 10 August 1942, Bauer force landed his Bf 109 F-4 (Werknummer 13241—factory number) at Nowy-Kalach. His aircraft had been damaged by enemy return fire and Bauer was again wounded, forcing him to surrender command of 9. Staffel to Leutnant Rolf Diergardt. On 1 September 1942, he was promoted to Hauptmann (captain).

=== Training commands ===
On recovery, Bauer was put in command of Ergänzungs-Jagdgruppe Ost (Supplementary Fighter Group, East) in southern France on 9 August 1943. In this command position, he was promoted to Major (major) on 1 May 1944. Promoted to Oberstleutnant (lieutenant colonel) and later to Oberst (colonel), Bauer was appointed Geschwaderkommodore (wing commander) of Ergänzungs-Jagdgeschwader 1 (EJG 1–1st Supplementary Fighter Wing) until the end of hostilities in May 1945. He was taken prisoner of war and released in July 1945.

== Later life ==
Bauer died on 13 December 1969 in Bad Homburg.

== Summary of career ==
=== Aerial victory claims ===
According to US historian David T. Zabecki, Bauer was credited with 106 aerial victories. Spick also lists Bauer with 106 aerial victories with one unconfirmed victory in over 400 combat missions, all but four claimed on the Eastern Front, and a mission-to-claim ratio of 3.77. Mathews and Foreman, authors of Luftwaffe Aces – Biographies and Victory Claims, researched the German Federal Archives and found records for 104 aerial victory claims, plus four further unconfirmed claim. This number omits claim number 26 which is numerically missing in their analysis.

Chronicle of aerial victories
This and the ♠ (Ace of spades) indicates those aerial victories which made Bauer an "ace-in-a-day", a term which designates a fighter pilot who has shot down five or more airplanes in a single day. This and the – (dash) indicates unconfirmed aerial victory claims for which Bauer did not receive credit. This and the ! (exclamation mark) indicates those aerial victories listed by Prien and Rodeike. This and the # (hash mark) indicates those aerial victories listed by Mathews and Foreman. This and the ? (question mark) indicates information discrepancies listed by Prien, Stemmer, Rodeike, Bock, Mathews and Foreman.
Claim!	Claim#	Date	Time	Type	Location	Unit	Claim!	Claim#	Date	Time	Type	Location	Unit
– Claims with Jagdgeschwader 77 during the Battle of France – 10 May – 25 June 1940
1	—	15 May 1940	14:10	Hurricane	west of Bruges	2./JG 77	2	1	18 May 1940	15:45	Hurricane	east of Cambrai	1./JG 77
– Claims with III./Jagdgeschwader 3 on the Channel Front – June 1940 – February 1941
3	—	1 November 1940	17:30	Spitfire	20 km (12 mi) south of Southend-on-Sea	9./JG 3	4	2	5 February 1941	14:00	Hurricane	30 km (19 mi) west of Calais	9./JG 3
– Claims with III./Jagdgeschwader 3 on the Eastern Front – Operation Barbarossa – June – November 1941
5	3	25 June 1941	07:40	Potez-63? (Note: According to Prien and Stemmer more likely a Petlyakov Pe-2.)	northeast of Berestechko	9./JG 3	22	20	9 July 1941	06:05	DB-3	10 km (6.2 mi) west of Berdychiv	9./JG 3
6	4	25 June 1941	07:45	Potez-63	northeast of Berestechko	9./JG 3	23	21	10 July 1941	17:00	I-15	2 km (1.2 mi) south of Makariv	9./JG 3
7♠	5	26 June 1941	11:20	SB-2	20 km (12 mi) southwest of Lutsk	9./JG 3	24	22	10 July 1941	17:10	DB-3	50 km (31 mi) east of Makariv	9./JG 3
8♠	6	26 June 1941	11:25	SB-2	25 km (16 mi) southwest of Lutsk	9./JG 3	25	23	11 July 1941	15:50	SB-3	40 km (25 mi) southeast of Makariv	9./JG 3
9♠	7	26 June 1941	13:45	SB-2	60 km (37 mi) north of Volodymyr-Volynskyi	9./JG 3	26		11 July 1941	15:51	SB-3	40 km (25 mi) southeast of Makariv	9./JG 3
10♠	8	26 June 1941	13:45	SB-2	60 km (37 mi) north of Volodymyr-Volynskyi	9./JG 3	27♠	24	12 July 1941	10:25	DB-3	southeast of Kiev	9./JG 3
11♠	9	26 June 1941	16:25	DB-3	northeast of Lutsk	9./JG 3	28♠	25	12 July 1941	10:27	DB-3	Kiev	9./JG 3
12	10	27 June 1941	12:20	I-16	10 km (6.2 mi) northwest of Lemberg	9./JG 3	29♠	27	12 July 1941	10:30	DB-3	25 km (16 mi) southeast Motyzhyn	9./JG 3
13	11	29 June 1941	14:40	V-11? (Note: According to Mathews and Foreman an Ilyushin Il-2.)	10 km (6.2 mi) northwest of Dubno	9./JG 3	30♠	28	12 July 1941	10:40	DB-3	southeast of Motyzhyn	9./JG 3
14	12	29 June 1941	14:43	V-11	20 km (12 mi) northeast of Rivne	9./JG 3	31♠	29	12 July 1941	10:42	DB-3	southeast of Motyzhyn	9./JG 3
15	13	29 June 1941	14:50	V-11	20 km (12 mi) northeast of Rivne	9./JG 3	32	30	13 July 1941	11:11	DB-3	north of Fastiv	9./JG 3
16	14	29 June 1941	17:40	PZL P-37	southwest of Olevsk	9./JG 3	33	31	13 July 1941	11:15	DB-3	west of Bijschow	9./JG 3
17	15	30 June 1941	12:10	ZKB-19? (Note: According to Mathews and Foreman a DB-3.)	10 km (6.2 mi) east of Ostroh	9./JG 3	34	32	13 July 1941	11:16	DB-3	20 km (12 mi) southwest of Kiev	9./JG 3
18	16	30 June 1941	12:13	ZKB-19	10 km (6.2 mi) east of Ostroh	9./JG 3	35	33	16 July 1941	10:40	DB-3	10 km (6.2 mi) east of Pavoloch	9./JG 3
19	17	30 June 1941	15:05	DB-3	10 km (6.2 mi) southwest of Ostroh	9./JG 3	36	34	23 July 1941	17:17	I-153	6 km (3.7 mi) northwest of Tarashcha	9./JG 3
20	18	8 July 1941	17:15	SB-2	18 km (11 mi) west of Berdychiv	9./JG 3	37	—	23 July 1941	17:30	I-153	10 km (6.2 mi) northwest of Tarashcha	9./JG 3
21	19	8 July 1941	17:18	SB-2	25 km (16 mi) west of Berdychiv	9./JG 3							
– Claims with III./Jagdgeschwader 3 on the Eastern Front – Winter War — February – April 1942
38	35	13 February 1942	12:50	Pe-2	20 km (12 mi) east of Staraya Russa	9./JG 3	45	42	22 March 1942	17:05	Il-2	25 km (16 mi) east-northeast of Staraya Russa	9./JG 3
39	36	15 February 1942	15:10	Pe-2	3 km (1.9 mi) northwest of Novgorod	9./JG 3	46	43	31 March 1942	14:35	I-61? (Note: According to Mathews and Foreman a Mikoyan-Gurevich MiG-3.)	20 km (12 mi) east of Staraya Russa	9./JG 3
40	37	18 February 1942	16:00	I-61	15 km (9.3 mi) southeast of Staraya Russa	9./JG 3	47	44	31 March 1942	14:45	I-61	30 km (19 mi) northeast of Staraya Russa	9./JG 3
41	38	18 February 1942	16:10	I-61	15 km (9.3 mi) southeast of Staraya Russa	9./JG 3	48	45	1 April 1942	17:05	I-301? (Note: According to Mathews and Foreman a Lavochkin-Gorbunov-Gudkov LaGG-3.)	10 km (6.2 mi) southeast of Ramushevo	9./JG 3
42	39	19 February 1942	16:40	I-61	5 km (3.1 mi) north of Staraya Russa	9./JG 3	49	46	1 April 1942	17:12	Pe-2	2 km (1.2 mi) north of Zaluchye	9./JG 3
43	40	22 March 1942	16:55	I-61	15 km (9.3 mi) south of Staraya Russa	9./JG 3	50	47	4 April 1942	14:30	I-61	5 km (3.1 mi) north of Sytschewo	9./JG 3
44	41	22 March 1942	16:58	Il-2	5 km (3.1 mi) east of Staraya Russa	9./JG 3	51	48	4 April 1942	17:42	I-301	3 km (1.9 mi) east of Parfino	9./JG 3
– Claims with III./Jagdgeschwader 3 on the Eastern Front – May – August 1942
52	49	19 May 1942	10:00	I-61	20 km (12 mi) southwest of Stary Saltov	9./JG 3	79♠	77	7 July 1942	03:57	Il-2	1 km (0.62 mi) northeast of Voronezh	9./JG 3
53	50	20 May 1942	04:35	I-61	10 km (6.2 mi) east of Ternowaja	9./JG 3	80♠	78	9 July 1942	11:20	Il-2	3 km (1.9 mi) north of Voronezh	9./JG 3
54	51	20 May 1942	04:38	I-61	15 km (9.3 mi) east of Ternowaja	9./JG 3	81♠	79	9 July 1942	11:23	Il-2	30 km (19 mi) north of Voronezh	9./JG 3
55	52	20 May 1942	04:49	Il-2	3 km (1.9 mi) west of Wesseloje	9./JG 3	82♠	80	9 July 1942	11:25	Il-2	40 km (25 mi) north of Voronezh	9./JG 3
56	53	20 May 1942	11:56	Il-2	20 km (12 mi) northeast of Kharkiv	9./JG 3	83♠	81	9 July 1942	19:38	MiG-1	5 km (3.1 mi) north of Voronezh	9./JG 3
57	54	21 May 1942	07:40	I-61	1 km (0.62 mi) east of Ternowaja	9./JG 3	84♠	82	9 July 1942	19:55	MiG-1	20 km (12 mi) north-northeast of Voronezh	9./JG 3
58	55	22 May 1942	09:35	I-61	10 km (6.2 mi) south of Stary Saltov	9./JG 3	85	83	10 July 1942	04:02	MiG-1	10 km (6.2 mi) northwest of Voronezh	9./JG 3
59	56	22 May 1942	09:38	I-61	15 km (9.3 mi) southeast of Stary Saltov	9./JG 3	86	84	10 July 1942	04:02	MiG-1	10 km (6.2 mi) northwest of Voronezh	9./JG 3
60	57	22 May 1942	09:41	I-61 (Note: According to Mathews and Foreman an I-16.)	5 km (3.1 mi) north of Stary Saltov	9./JG 3	87	85	10 July 1942	04:06	MiG-1	30 km (19 mi) north-northeast of Voronezh	9./JG 3
61	58	22 May 1942	09:45	I-61	20 km (12 mi) east of Stary Saltov	9./JG 3	88	86	16 July 1942	18:15	P-40	10 km (6.2 mi) southwest of Tischkina	9./JG 3
	—	23 May 1942	05:25	Il-2		9./JG 3	89	87	16 July 1942	18:16	P-40	5 km (3.1 mi) west of Tischkina	9./JG 3
62	59	23 May 1942	05:35	Il-2	5 km (3.1 mi) north of Ternowaja	9./JG 3	90	88	16 July 1942	18:18	P-40	3 km (1.9 mi) southwest of Dubowy	9./JG 3
63	60	26 May 1942	18:55	MiG-1	15 km (9.3 mi) southeast of Balakleja	9./JG 3	91	89	16 July 1942	18:40	Il-2	7 km (4.3 mi) east-southeast of Arinowka	9./JG 3
64	61	27 May 1942	06:22	R-10? (Note: According to Mathews and Foreman claimed as a Seversky.)	10 km (6.2 mi) south of Balakleja	9./JG 3	92	90	22 July 1942	05:55	P-40	3 km (1.9 mi) southwest of Semikarakoeskaja	9./JG 3
65	62	26 June 1942	04:37	Pe-2	30 km (19 mi) southeast of Shchigry	9./JG 3	93	91	22 July 1942	05:57	LaGG-3	1 km (0.62 mi) east of Sjusjaskij	9./JG 3
—	63	29 June 1942	06:53	MiG-1	south of Kshen	9./JG 3	94	92	22 July 1942	06:00	Il-2	3 km (1.9 mi) south of Sjusjaskij	9./JG 3
66	64	30 June 1942	06:51	Il-2	1 km (0.62 mi) south of Kshen	9./JG 3	95	93	24 July 1942	10:51	Il-2	12 km (7.5 mi) southeast of Popow	9./JG 3
67	65	30 June 1942	06:52	MiG-1	1 km (0.62 mi) south of Kshen	9./JG 3	96	94	24 July 1942	10:52	Il-2	16 km (9.9 mi) southeast of Popow	9./JG 3
68	66	30 June 1942	06:53	MiG-1	5 km (3.1 mi) south of Kshen	9./JG 3	97	95	24 July 1942	10:55	Il-2	30 km (19 mi) west of Kalach	9./JG 3
69	67	30 June 1942	06:56	Il-2	20 km (12 mi) east of Kshen	9./JG 3	98	96	24 July 1942	10:56	MiG-1	30 km (19 mi) west of Kalach	9./JG 3
70	68	1 July 1942	19:10	Il-2	10 km (6.2 mi) north of Kshen	9./JG 3	99	97	25 July 1942	10:50	Hurricane	2 km (1.2 mi) east of Kalach	9./JG 3
71	69	5 July 1942	03:16	MiG-1	17 km (11 mi) southwest of Voronezh	9./JG 3	100	98	25 July 1942	10:52	Hurricane	10 km (6.2 mi) southeast of Kalach	9./JG 3
72	70	5 July 1942	03:17	Il-2	18 km (11 mi) south-southeast of Voronezh	9./JG 3	101	99	25 July 1942	10:54	Il-2	8 km (5.0 mi) southeast of Kalach	9./JG 3
73	71	5 July 1942	03:19	Il-2	20 km (12 mi) southeast of Voronezh	9./JG 3	102	100	25 July 1942	10:55	Il-2	4 km (2.5 mi) southeast of Kalach	9./JG 3
74	72	5 July 1942	03:22	Pe-2	5 km (3.1 mi) west of Voronezh	9./JG 3	103	101	9 August 1942	06:02	Su-2	5 km (3.1 mi) southeast of Kalach	9./JG 3
75♠	73	7 July 1942	03:01	MiG-1	5 km (3.1 mi) southeast of Voronezh	9./JG 3	104	102	9 August 1942	06:04? (Note: According to Mathews and Foreman at 6:06.)	LaGG-3	15 km (9.3 mi) east of Kalach	9./JG 3
76♠	74	7 July 1942	03:02	MiG-1	5 km (3.1 mi) south of Nowo Uschman	9./JG 3	105	103	9 August 1942	06:07	LaGG-3	10 km (6.2 mi) east of Kalach	9./JG 3
77♠	75	7 July 1942	03:41	Il-2	3 km (1.9 mi) south of Maslowka	9./JG 3	106	104	9 August 1942	06:10	Su-2	20 km (12 mi) northwest of Stalingrad	9./JG 3
78♠	76	7 July 1942	03:55	Il-2	2 km (1.2 mi) northwest of Voronezh	9./JG 3							

=== Awards ===
- Iron Cross (1939)
  - 2nd Class (1 November 1939)
  - 1st Class (18 November 1940)
- Honorary Cup of the Luftwaffe on 22 June 1942 as Oberleutnant and pilot
- Knight's Cross of the Iron Cross with Oak Leaves
  - Knight's Cross on 30 July 1941 as Oberleutnant and Staffelkapitän of the 9./Jagdgeschwader 3 (Note: According to Scherzer as Oberleutnant and pilot in the III./Jagdgeschwader 3)
  - 107th Oak Leaves on 26 July 1942 as Oberleutnant and Staffelkapitän of the 9./Jagdgeschwader 3 "Udet"
