= Klaus Quaet-Faslem =

German World War II fighter pilot (1913–1944)

- Born: 5 September 1913; Kiel, Kingdom of Prussia, German Empire
- Died: 30 January 1944 (aged 30); Langeleben/Braunschweig, Nazi Germany
- Burial place: Cemetery in Mönchengladbach-Holt
- Military career
- Allegiance: Nazi Germany
- Branch: Luftwaffe
- Service years: ?–1944
- Rank: Oberstleutnant (lieutenant colonel)
- Units: LG 2, JG 53, JG 3
- Commands: I./JG 3
- Conflicts: World War II: Eastern Front; Defence of the Reich
- Awards: Knight's Cross of the Iron Cross

Klaus Quaet-Faslem (5 September 1913 – 30 January 1944) was a Luftwaffe ace and recipient of the Knight's Cross of the Iron Cross during World War II. The Knight's Cross of the Iron Cross, and its variants were the highest awards in the military and paramilitary forces of Nazi Germany during World War II. On 30 January 1944 he was killed in a flying accident due to bad weather. He was posthumously awarded the Knight's Cross on 9 June 1944. During his career he was credited with 49 aerial victories.

== Early life and career ==
Quaet-Faslem was born on 5 September 1913 in Kiel, at the time in the Province of Schleswig-Holstein, a province of the Kingdom of Prussia. Following flight training, (Note: Flight training in the Luftwaffe progressed through the levels A1, A2 and B1, B2, referred to as A/B flight training. A training included theoretical and practical training in aerobatics, navigation, long-distance flights and dead-stick landings. The B courses included high-altitude flights, instrument flights, night landings and training to handle the aircraft in difficult situations.) Quaet-Faslem was posted to 3. Staffel (3rd Squadron) of Küstenfliegergruppe 106, a naval aerial reconnaissance unit, in 1936. In 1939, he was transferred to 1. Staffel of Lehrgeschwader 2 (LG 2—2nd Demonstration Wing).

== World War II ==
In preparation for the German invasion of Poland on 1 September 1939, I.(Jagd)/LG 2 (1st Fighter Group of the 2nd Demonstration Wing) under command of Hauptmann Hanns Trübenbach had been ordered to airfields at Lottin (now Lotyń), where the Gruppenstab (headquarters unit), 2. and 3. Staffel where based, and to Malzkow (now Malczkowo) near Stolp (now Słupsk), where 1. Staffel had been sent. On 4 September, I.(Jagd)/LG 2 flew two combat missions over the combat area of the German 4. Armee (4th Army), the first from 12:02 to 13:05 and the second from 17:35 to 18:37 with 1. Staffel for the first time encountering Polish Air Force fighter aircraft. Depending on source, Quaet-Faslem claimed his first aerial victory that day, it may have been a PZL P.11 or a PZL P.24. Irrespectively of type, the claim was not confirmed. Following the German advance, I.(Jagd)/LG 2 relocated to Lauenburg (now Lębork), near Bromberg on 9 September in support the 4. Armee.

On 20 October 1940, Quaet-Faslem was transferred from Jagdfliegerschule 1 (1st fighter pilot school) at Werneuchen to III. Gruppe (3rd group) of Jagdgeschwader 53 (JG 53—53rd Fighter Wing) where he assumed the position of adjutant. At the time, III. Gruppe was commanded by Hauptmann Wolf-Dietrich Wilcke.

=== Operation Barbarossa ===
In preparation of Operation Barbarossa, the German invasion of the Soviet Union, JG 53 arrived in Mannheim-Sandhofen on 8 June 1941 where the aircraft were given a maintenance overhaul. On 12 June, the Geschwader began its relocation east, with III. Gruppe moving to Suwałki in northeastern Poland. Two days later, III. Gruppe transferred to a forward airfield at Sobolewo.

On 21 November 1941, Quaet-Faslem was appointed Staffelkapitän (squadron leader) of 2. Staffel of JG 53, succeeding Oberleutnant Ignaz Prestele who was transferred.

On 19 August 1942, Quaet-Faslem was transferred and was succeeded by Leutant Walter Zellot as commander of 2. Staffel of JG 53. On 31 August, he took command of I. Gruppe of Jagdgeschwader 3 "Udet" (JG 3—3rd Fighter Wing), succeeding Hauptmann Georg Michalek.

=== Defense of the Reich and death ===
In March 1943, I. Gruppe had assembled at Döberitz, located approximately 10 kilometers (6.2 miles) west of Staaken, for a period of rest, replenishment and preparation for defense of the Reich missions. In early April, the Gruppe was ordered to Mönchengladbach after it had received 37 factory new Messerschmitt Bf 109 G-4 fighter aircraft equipped with a pair of 20 mm MG 151/20 cannons installed in conformal gun pods under the wings. There, the pilots trained formation flying, operating in Staffel and Gruppen strength, required to combat the United States Army Air Forces (USAAF) heavy bomber formations. A few of the more experienced fighter pilots were sent to Brandenburg-Briest for additional training on Y-Control for fighters, a system to control groups of fighters intercepting USAAF bomber formations. In early May, the Gruppe had completed its training period and was subordinated to Stab of JG 3 which was under control of 3. Jagd-Division (3rd Fighter Division).

On 17 August 1943 during the Schweinfurt-Regensburg mission, Quaet-Faslem claimed his 48th aerial victory when he shot down a Boeing B-17 Flying Fortress bomber. Following aerial combat on 24 October, Quaet-Faslem made a forced landing in his Bf 109 G-6 (Werknummer 27149—factory number) at Lille.

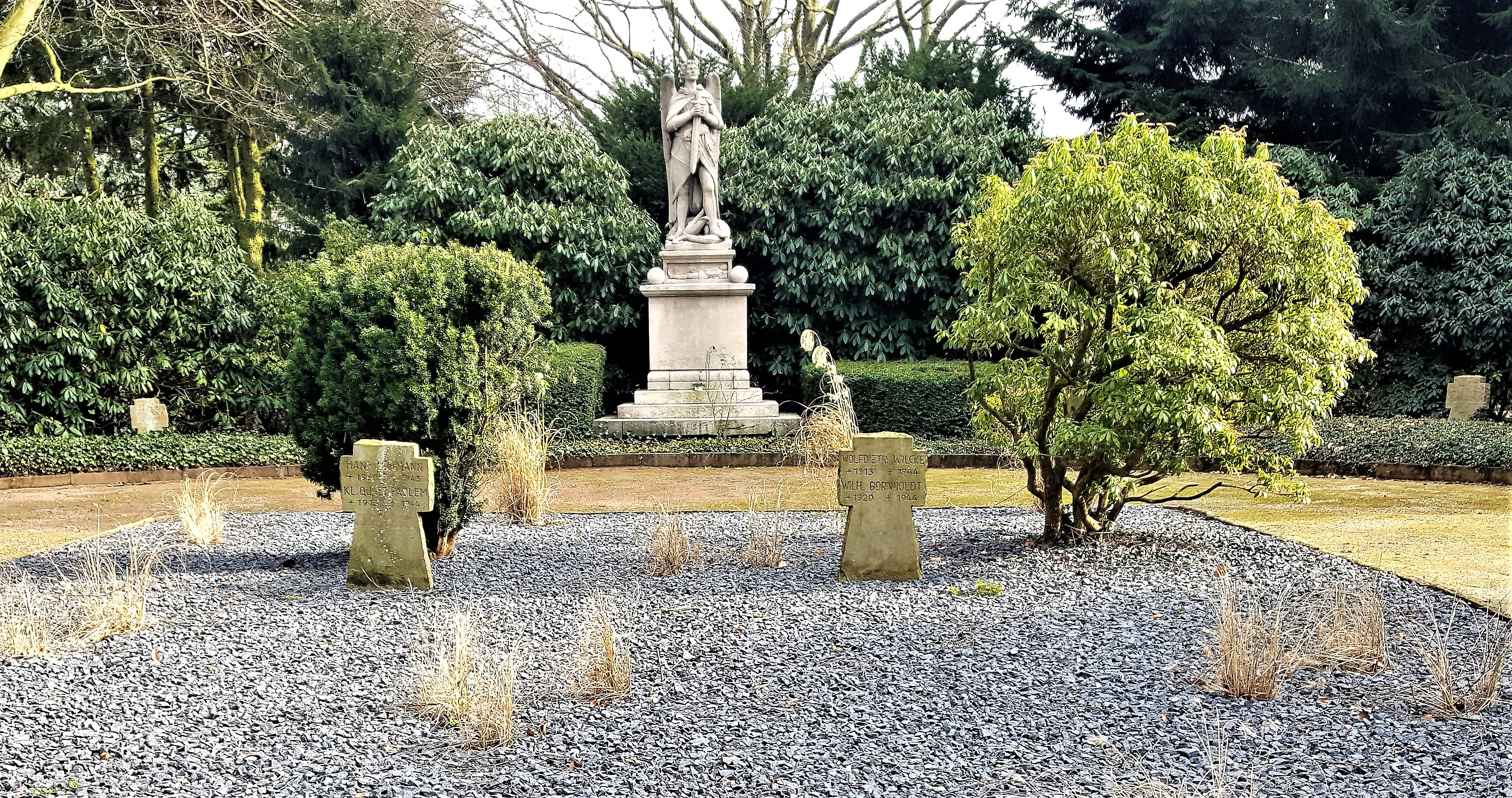
Graves of honor in the Mönchengladbach-Holt cemetery. Klaus Quaet-Faslem's gravestone is on the left.

On 30 January 1944, Quaet-Faslem was killed in a flying accident when his Bf 109 G-6 (Werknummer 15243) crashed in bad weather at Langeleben near Helmstedt. Following his death, Hauptmann Joachim von Wehren temporarily assumed command of the Gruppe before Hauptmann Josef Haiböck officially took command on 8 February. His grave is located on the cemetery Mönchengladbach-Holt, next to the grave of Wolf-Dietrich Wilcke.

== Summary of military career ==
=== Aerial victory claims ===
According to Obermaier, Quaet-Faslem was credited with 49 aerial victories, of which 41 were claimed on the Eastern Front, one over Poland and seven over the Western Allies, including two four-engine heavy bombers. Mathews and Foreman, authors of Luftwaffe Aces — Biographies and Victory Claims, researched the German Federal Archives and found records for 49 aerial victory claims, plus one further unconfirmed claim. This figure includes 42 aerial victories on the Eastern Front and seven on the Western Front, including two four-engine heavy bombers and one de Havilland Mosquito fighter bomber.

Victory claims were logged to a map-reference (PQ = Planquadrat), for example "PQ 4939". The Luftwaffe grid map (Jägermeldenetz) covered all of Europe, western Russia and North Africa and was composed of rectangles measuring 15 minutes of latitude by 30 minutes of longitude, an area of about 360 square miles (930 km^{2}). These sectors were then subdivided into 36 smaller units to give a location area 3 km × 4 km (1.9 mi × 2.5 mi) in size.

Chronicle of aerial victories
This and the – (dash) indicates unconfirmed aerial victory claims for which Quaet-Faslem did not receive credit. This and the ? (question mark) indicates information discrepancies listed by Prien, Stemmer, Rodeike, Bock, Mathews and Foreman.
Claim	Date	Time	Type	Location	Claim	Date	Time	Type	Location
– 1.(Jagd) Staffel of Lehrgeschwader 2 – Invasion of Poland — 1–30 September 1939
—	4 September 1939	—	PZL P.24	vicinity of Poczałkowo	1	9 September 1939	17:02	PZL P.24 (Note: This is certainly a misidentified PZL P.11c fighter – however, according to Łydżba, Polish III/3 Squadron, which took part in this combat, had only two P.11c damaged after 16:50, while five German pilots were credited with victories.)	vicinity of Lubień
– Stab III. Gruppe of Jagdgeschwader 53 – Operation Barbarossa — 22 June – July 1941
2	22 June 1941	16:45	I-17 (MiG-1)		5	5 July 1941	16:06	R-5	
3	22 June 1941	16:47	I-17 (MiG-1)		6	14 July 1941	14:22	R-5	
4	26 June 1941	10:01	DB-3						
– Stab I. Gruppe of Jagdgeschwader 53 – Operation Barbarossa — July – 7 August 1941
— (Note: This unconfirmed claim is not listed by Mathews and Foreman.)	25 July 1941	—	DB-3		—	4 August 1941	—	I-16	
– Stab I. Gruppe of Jagdgeschwader 53 – Action over the Netherlands — 7 August – 15 December 1941
7	24 October 1941	15:40	Spitfire	80 km (50 mi) west of Zandvoort					
– 2. Staffel of Jagdgeschwader 53 – Mediterranean Theater — 15 December 1941 – 30 April 1942
8	22 December 1941	14:36	Hurricane	Malta	10	14 April 1942	16:45	Beaufort	
9	15 February 1942	09:17? (Note: According to Mathews and Foreman claimed at 09:11.)	Beaufort						
– 2. Staffel of Jagdgeschwader 53 – Eastern Front — 28 May – 18 August 1942
11	1 June 1942	08:25	I-61 (MiG-3)		24	7 August 1942	10:47	MiG-1	PQ 4939; 25 km (16 mi) south of Stalingrad
12	1 July 1942	12:20	P-39	6 km (3.7 mi) southwest of Voronezh	25	8 August 1942	07:06	Il-2	PQ 49612; 35 km (22 mi) south-southeast of Stalingrad
13	3 July 1942	13:15	Il-2	15 km (9.3 mi) northeast of Semljansk	26	8 August 1942	17:30	Er-2	PQ 49351; 15 km (9.3 mi) southwest of Stalingrad
14	3 July 1942	13:25	Il-2	20 km (12 mi) south-southwest of Zadonsk	27	10 August 1942	08:27	LaGG-3	PQ 39364; 15 km (9.3 mi) south of Stalingrad
15	5 July 1942	13:17	Boston	6 km (3.7 mi) east of Nishnij Kaluchowka	28	12 August 1942	04:38	LaGG-3	PQ 49351; 15 km (9.3 mi) southwest of Stalingrad
16	5 July 1942	13:40	Boston	9 km (5.6 mi) east of Bojewo railway station	29	13 August 1942	17:40	LaGG-3	PQ 39422; 20 km (12 mi) southwest of Pitomnik Airfield
17	8 July 1942	11:22	Il-2		30	13 August 1942	17:45	MiG-3? (Note: According to Mathews and Foreman claimed as a Ilyushin Il-2.)	PQ 39432; 15 km (9.3 mi) south of Pitomnik Airfield
18	11 July 1942	09:54	I-61 (MiG-3)		31	13 August 1942	18:12	Il-2	PQ 49182; 5 km (3.1 mi) north of Bassargino
19	1 August 1942	07:04	LaGG-3	PQ 39251; 15 km (9.3 mi) northwest of Pitomnik Airfield	32	16 August 1942	13:30	LaGG-3	PQ 40752; 30 km (19 mi) north of Gumrak
20	5 August 1942	15:23	R-Z? (Note: According to Mathews and Foreman claimed as a Polikarpov R-5.)	PQ 49653; 50 km (31 mi) south-southeast of Stalingrad	33	17 August 1942	12:20? (Note: According to Mathews and Foreman claimed at 12:25.)	Il-2	PQ 39433; 15 km (9.3 mi) south of Pitomnik Airfield
21	6 August 1942	10:33	MiG-1	PQ 49534; 30 km (19 mi) south of Stalingrad	34	17 August 1942	17:03	LaGG-3	PQ 40774; 75 km (47 mi) north-northeast of Pitomnik Airfield
22	6 August 1942	10:43	R-Z?	PQ 49382; 25 km (16 mi) south of Bassargino	35	17 August 1942	17:07? (Note: According to Mathews and Foreman claimed at 17:08.)	LaGG-3	PQ 30893; 25 km (16 mi) north of Pitomnik Airfield
23	6 August 1942	15:00	MiG-1	PQ 4955; 45 km (28 mi) south-southwest of Stalingrad					
– Stab I. Gruppe of Jagdgeschwader 3 "Udet" – Eastern Front — 19 August 1942 – 20 January 1943
36	19 August 1942	17:30	LaGG-3	PQ 35 Ost 40794	42	3 September 1942	06:00	LaGG-3	PQ 35 Ost 49434
37	19 August 1942	17:47	Il-2	PQ 35 Ost 40841	43	3 September 1942	06:30	P-40	6 km (3.7 mi) southeast of Srednyaya Akhtuba; 40 km (25 mi) east of Stalingrad
38	22 August 1942	17:50	Pe-2	PQ 35 Ost 49131; 5 km (3.1 mi) north of Grebenka	44	3 September 1942	17:30	Yak-1	PQ 35 Ost 59142
39	23 August 1942	06:05	I-180 (Yak-7)	PQ 35 Ost 49253, northeast of Stalingrad; 45 km (28 mi) east-northeast of Stalingrad	45	12 December 1942	09:30	Pe-2	PQ 35 Ost 3987
40	2 September 1942	06:24	Pe-2	PQ 35 Ost 50823	46	20 December 1942	11:00	Il-2	PQ 35 Ost 3963
41	2 September 1942	06:25	Pe-2	PQ 35 Ost 50823					
– Stab I. Gruppe of Jagdgeschwader 3 "Udet" – Defense of the Reich — 1 May – 22 October 1943
47	17 July 1943	10:45	B-17	PQ 05 Ost S/GJ over sea, off Haarlem	48	17 August 1943	15:58	B-17	PQ 05 Ost S/QR-7; Geisenheim, west of Mainz
– Stab I. Gruppe of Jagdgeschwader 3 "Udet" – Action in the West — 1–8 January 1944
49	4 January 1944	15:55	Mosquito	west of Amiens					

=== Awards ===
- Iron Cross (1939) 2nd and 1st Class
- Honor Goblet of the Luftwaffe on 21 September 1942 as Oberleutnant and pilot
- German Cross in Gold on 29 October 1942 as Oberleutnant in the I./Jagdgeschwader 53
- Knight's Cross of the Iron Cross on 9 June 1944 (posthumously) as Major and Gruppenkommandeur of the I./Jagdgeschwader 3 "Udet"
