= 14th Signal Regiment =

British Army military unit

14 Signal Regiment (Electronic Warfare)
- 14 Signal Regiment (EW) Insignia
- Active: 1959–present
- Allegiance: United Kingdom
- Branch: British Army
- Type: Combat Support
- Role: Electronic Warfare
- Size: Five Squadrons; 606 personnel
- Part of: Cyber and Electro Magnetic Activities Effects Group
- Garrison/HQ: Cawdor Barracks, Pembrokeshire
- Battle honours: see Battle Honours

Insignia
- Cap Badge

- Tactical Recognition Flash

The 14th Signal Regiment (Electronic Warfare) is a part of the British Army's Royal Corps of Signals. The regiment's role is to provide electronic warfare (EW) capability in support of deployed Land Commanders, in order to enable operations in the electronic battlespace. It is the only British Army regiment capable of conducting sustainable electronic warfare in support of national operations worldwide. The regiment is currently based at Cawdor Barracks, on the site of the former RAF Brawdy, near Haverfordwest, in South Wales.

== History ==
14th Signal Regiment was originally formed on 9 September 1959 in London to provide worldwide communications on behalf of the War Office, superseding the United Kingdom Commonwealth Communications Army Network Signal Regiment (COMCAN). During the 1960s the regiment was involved in various activities based around the skills of the units placed under its command, including trials for the development of Skynet satellite. In 1962 the regimental HQ moved to Gloucester until 1968 when it was relocated to Norton Barracks, Worcester from December of that year.

The regiment's main role was changed to Force Rear Link following the formation of the Defence Communications Network at RAF Stanbridge in 1969. As part of 1st Signal Group the regiment provided detachments to numerous locations worldwide in support of deployed units, including: Northern Ireland, Anguilla and Honduras (1969), Jordan (1970), the United Arab Emirates (1971), British Honduras / Belize (1972) and twenty other countries over the following four years. This busy chapter finally came to an end on 6 November 1976 when it amalgamated with 30 Signal Regiment in Blandford Forum, Dorset.

It reformed as 14th Signal Regiment (Electronic Warfare) at Tofrek Barracks, Hildesheim in Germany on 1 July 1977 with a headquarters and three squadrons to provide electronic warfare support to the Commander of 1st British Corps. 1 Squadron was based in Langeleben, 2 Squadron in Wesendorf and 3 Squadron was co-located with the RHQ in Hildesheim. In April 1978, the regimental headquarters was re-sited to Ironside Barracks, in Scheuen, north of Celle in order to be closer to the sub-units under its command. This only presented temporary accommodation and so the regiment moved again in 1985 to Taunton Barracks, Celle; a 19th-century neo-Gothic complex which is now Celle Town Hall, previously used by 94 Locating Regiment RA.

In 1992, the regiment's mission was changed to provide electronic warfare support to NATO and to the British elements under its command, this as a result of the formation of the Allied Rapid Reaction Corps. Changes in the organisation of the British Army caused the regiment to move its headquarters and two of its three field squadrons (226 and 245 Signal Squadrons) to Osnabrück, in April 1993. The third field squadron, 237 Signal Squadron (Electronic Warfare), moved to Hullavington, England at the same time. In December 1995, the German-based elements moved again, to Cawdor Barracks near Haverfordwest, Pembrokeshire, and 237 Signal Squadron joined them six months later after an operational deployment to Bosnia.

As a result of the requirement to provide five deployable squadrons to support operations in Afghanistan (Operation Herrick), 224 Signal Squadron was formed on 21 June 2004 as a joint services unit, composed mostly of personnel from the Royal Corps of Signals, Intelligence Corps and the RAF. The Squadron was based at RAF Digby in Lincolnshire until it was disbanded in 2009.

Under the Army 2020 Refine programme, it was announced the regiment would shift to a new location; however, its future barracks is yet to be determined. 14th Signal Regiment has moved its Cyber Protection Teams 1-6 to 13th Signal Regiment's 224 Signal Squadron.

== Organisation ==
The current organisation of the regiment is (with roles):

- Regimental Headquarters, at Cawdor Barracks, Brawdy
- 223 Signal Squadron (Electronic Warfare and Signals Intelligence, supports 3rd (UK) Division)
  - Army Element, Joint Signals Intelligence Unit (Troop sized), at RAF Digby
- 226 Signal Squadron (Airborne and Light Manoeuvre Electronic Warfare Forces, under operational command of 16 Air Assault Brigade)
- 237 Signal Squadron (Armoured Manoeuvre Electronic Warfare forces to 12 and 20 Armoured Infantry Bdes)
- 245 Signal Squadron (Strike Electronic Warfare forces and cyber warfare)

== Operations ==
Operation	Country	Year
Falklands War (Operation Corporate)	(United Kingdom) Falklands	1982
Operation Granby	Iraq	1991-2
Implementation Force (Operation Resolute)	Bosnia	1995-6
Kosovo War (Operation Agricola)	Kosovo	1999
Operation Telic	Iraq	2003-9
Operation Fingal	Afghanistan	2001-2
Operation Herrick 4–20	Afghanistan	2006–14

== Heraldry & ceremonial ==
The existing regimental badge was introduced on 28 May 1982. It consists of a shield with a white horse and a bolt of lightning and replaced the coat of arms of Gloucester.

== Honours ==
- Freedom of Entry into Gloucester on 28 April 1966.
- Freedom of Celle on 10 July 1987.
- Freedom of St Davids on 12 May 1997.
- Freedom of Haverfordwest on 10 February 2009.

== Alliances ==
- Royal Navy: Y Squadron, Royal Navy
- Australia: 7th Signal Regiment (Australia)
- Canada: 21 Electronic Warfare Regiment
- Denmark: 102 Electronic Warfare Company
- Germany: 320th Fernmelde Regiment
- France: 54e Régiment de Transmissions
- United States: 66th Military Intelligence Brigade

== See also ==
- List of cyber warfare forces
- Units of the Royal Corps of Signals
