= Georg Michalek =

German Luftwaffe fighter ace (1913–1992)

- Michalek as an Oberleutnant
- Born: 17 June 1913; Vienna, Austria-Hungary
- Died: 2 September 1992 (aged 79); São Paulo, Brazil
- Military career
- Allegiance: Nazi Germany
- Branch: Luftwaffe
- Service years: ?–1945
- Rank: Major (major)
- Units: JG 3 Ergänzungs-Jagdgruppe West
- Commands: I./JG 3 Ergänzungs-Jagdgruppe West; JG 108
- Conflicts: World War II: Battle of Britain; Eastern Front; Battle of Stalingrad; Defence of the Reich
- Awards: Knight's Cross of the Iron Cross

Georg Michalek (17 June 1913 – 2 September 1992) was a Luftwaffe ace and recipient of the Knight's Cross of the Iron Cross during World War II. The Knight's Cross of the Iron Cross, and its variants were the highest awards in the military and paramilitary forces of Nazi Germany during World War II. During his career Georg Michalek was credited with between 59 and 62 aerial victories.

== Early life ==
Michalek was born 17 June 1913, in Vienna, then the capital of Austria-Hungary. Mickalek was attached to the Austrian Air Force in 1935 as a Leutnant in an anti-aircraft regiment. After the Anschluss in March 1938, he became a member of Jagdgeschwader 138 (JG 138—138th Fighter Wing), in the German Luftwaffe. In March 1938, the Luftwaffe initiated the formation of a single Gruppe (group) at Wien-Aspern Airfield. On 1 April, this unit became the newly formed I. Gruppe (1st group) of JG 138 also referred to as the "Wiener-Jagdgruppe" ("Vienna fighter group"), largely staffed with former Austrian Air Force personnel. On 1 November, the Gruppe was re-designated and became I. Gruppe of Jagdgeschwader 134 (JG 134—134th Fighter Wing), and again renamed on 1 May 1939, becoming the I. Gruppe of Jagdgeschwader 76 (JG 76—76th Fighter Wing). Initially equipped with the Fiat CR.32 while 3. Staffel received the Messerschmitt Bf 109 B. At the start of World War II, Michalek was serving in Jagdgeschwader 52.

== World War II ==
On 15 July 1941, Michalek was appointed Staffelkapitän (squadron leader) of 4. Staffel of Jagdgeschwader 3 (JG 3—3rd Fighter Wing). He succeeded Oberleutnant Karl Faust who had been killed in action three days before.

In recognition of 37 aerial victories claimed, Michalek was awarded the Knight's Cross of the Iron Cross (Ritterkreuz des Eisernes Kreuzes) on 4 November 1941 and at the same time promoted to Hauptmann (captain).

=== Group commander ===
On 15 January 1942, I. Gruppe of JG 3 became the II. Gruppe of Jagdgeschwader 1. In consequence a new I. Gruppe of JG 3 was created on 1 March 1942. This new I. Gruppe was created from the Ergänzungsgrupp, the supplementary training group of JG 3 at Wiesbaden Airfield and placed under command of Michalek. Command of 4. Staffel was thus passed on to Oberleutnant Walther Dahl. Initially equipped with the older versions of the Messerschmitt Bf 109, the Gruppe received a full complement of factory new Bf 109 F-4 trop aircraft in late March. The Gruppe continued their training until 20 April when they began relocating to the Eastern Front in preparation for Case Blue, the German strategic summer offensive in southern Russia.

In August 1942, Michalek was posted to a fighter pilot school. In consequence, command of I. Gruppe went to Hauptmann Klaus Quaet-Faslem.

== Summary of career ==
=== Aerial victory claims ===
According to Obermaier, Michalek was credited with at least 59 aerial victories, including six over the Western Allies. Mathews and Foreman, authors of Luftwaffe Aces — Biographies and Victory Claims, researched the German Federal Archives and found records for 49 aerial victory claims, all of which claimed on the Eastern Front.

Victory claims were logged to a map-reference (PQ = Planquadrat), for example "PQ 35 Ost 92114". The Luftwaffe grid map (Jägermeldenetz) covered all of Europe, western Russia and North Africa and was composed of rectangles measuring 15 minutes of latitude by 30 minutes of longitude, an area of about 360 square miles (930 km^{2}). These sectors were then subdivided into 36 smaller units to give a location area 3 km × 4 km (1.9 mi × 2.5 mi) in size.

Chronicle of aerial victories
Claim	Date	Time	Type	Location	Claim	Date	Time	Type	Location
– 4. Staffel of Jagdgeschwader 3 – Operation Barbarossa — 22 June – 1 November 1941
12	16 July 1941	18:45	R-Z		25	12 August 1941	18:15	I-153	5 km (3.1 mi) west of Kyiv
13	20 July 1941	15:40	I-153		26	17 August 1941	09:05	DB-3	
14	21 July 1941	18:45	I-153		27	21 August 1941	17:50	DB-3	
15	23 July 1941	11:25	DB-3		28	22 August 1941	09:51	R-5	
16	26 July 1941	06:35	I-153		29	22 August 1941	09:52	R-5	west of Dnjepropetrowsk
17	26 July 1941	11:15	V-11		30	22 August 1941	09:55	R-5	
18	31 July 1941	12:15	I-16	5 km (3.1 mi) south of Kyiv	31	25 August 1941	11:10	SB-3	
19	3 August 1941	13:15	I-153		32	31 August 1941	13:02	V-11	
20	8 August 1941	14:40	DB-3		33	1 September 1941	16:40	SB-3	
21	9 August 1941	09:50	DB-3		34	6 September 1941	16:48	SB-3	8 km (5.0 mi) north of Koteberda
22	9 August 1941	09:53	DB-3		35	18 October 1941	13:12	I-61	
23	11 August 1941	16:18	Pe-2		36	19 October 1941	12:38	Pe-2	
24	11 August 1941	16:20	Pe-2		37	22 October 1941	10:22	I-16	
– Stab I. Gruppe of Jagdgeschwader 3 "Udet" – Eastern Front — 6 January – August 1942
38	8 May 1942	12:06	MiG-3		51	5 July 1942	06:30	LaGG-3	PQ 35 Ost 92114, Gnesdowka
39	2 June 1942	14:34	I-153		52	5 July 1942	19:04	Yak-4	
40	11 June 1942	06:45	Il-2		53	7 July 1942	18:37	Yak-1	
41	11 June 1942	12:15	Su-2		54	8 July 1942	18:45	LaGG-3	
42	22 June 1942	15:36	MiG-3		55	8 July 1942	18:55	LaGG-3	
43	22 June 1942	18:25	Il-2	PQ 35 Ost 70232	56	9 July 1942	05:02	LaGG-3	
44	22 June 1942	18:27	Il-2	PQ 35 Ost 70232	57	22 July 1942	13:25	Il-2	5 km (3.1 mi) northeast of Lisow
45	23 June 1942	19:20	LaGG-3	north of Kupjansk	58	22 July 1942	13:32	MiG-1	3 km (1.9 mi) east of Ssurowikino
46	23 June 1942	19:23	LaGG-3	south of Monatschiwowka	59	22 July 1942	13:37	MiG-1	
47	28 June 1942	13:04	Yak-4	PQ 35 Ost 72272	60	23 July 1942	12:39	Il-2	
48	28 June 1942	19:05	LaGG-3	PQ 35 72124	61	23 July 1942	12:41	Il-2	
49	4 July 1942	14:45	LaGG-3	western edge of Voronezh	62	23 July 1942	12:45	Il-2	
50	5 July 1942	06:25	LaGG-3	PQ 35 Ost 92184, Gnesdowka					

=== Awards ===
- Iron Cross (1939) 2nd and 1st Class
- Knight's Cross of the Iron Cross on 4 November 1941 as Oberleutnant and Staffelkapitän of the 4./Jagdgeschwader 3
- Honor Goblet of the Luftwaffe on 18 May 1942 as Oberleutnant and Staffelkapitän

Military offices
Preceded by Hauptmann Hans von Hahn	Commander of I. Jagdgeschwader 3; 1 March 1942 – 31 August 1942	Succeeded by Major Klaus Quaet-Faslem
Preceded by Major Jürgen Roth	Commander of Ergänzungs-Jagdgruppe West; 5 January 1943 – 3 January 1944	Succeeded by Hauptmann Herbert Wehnelt
