= Langeleben =

Middle Ages settlement in Lower Saxony, Germany

Coordinates: 52°12′31.99″N 10°48′50.19″E

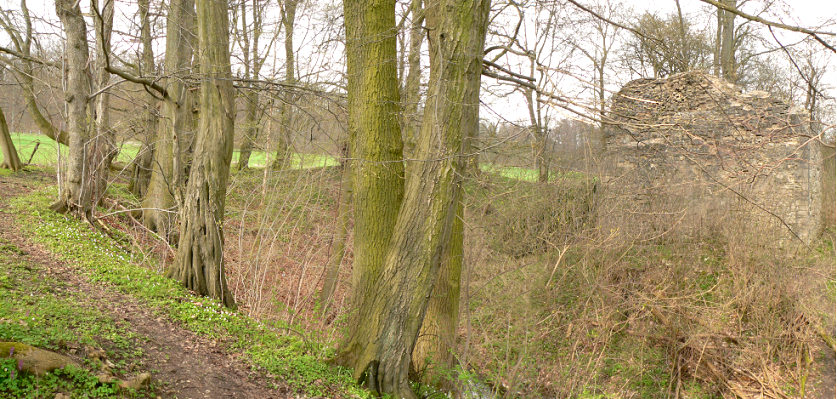
Ruin of the water castle Langeleben with moat and outer wall

Langeleben is a historical location at 260 m above sea level, in the northern part of the Elm ridge in Lower Saxony, Germany and today belongs to the nearby town of Königslutter am Elm. Langeleben was a crossing point for three ancient roads through the Elm district. In the past a respectable stately home, a moated castle built in the Middle Ages, stood here, as did a hunting lodge and hamlet which were also called Langeleben. This once important estate and village was home to an average of 80 residents who were responsible for the clearing and management of a large area of the then dense forest. A lightly wooded area for a cemetery contain many old graves under the trees. From the original castle only some remnants of the foundations can today be seen. No trace can be found of the village or former hunting lodge which once belonged to the Duke of Brunswick in the 18th century.

== History ==
=== Middle ages ===
The first discovered mention of Langeleben was in documents from 1160 as Langelage which recorded it as a forestry clearing. The ending of the old name ...lage "-la(g)h" denotes its connection to the forest. The first mention of a stockade-like fortification there was recorded in 1258, and Langeleghe as a hamlet or villa was first recorded in 1328. In 1400 it is recorded that the population even had their own Vicar. The adoption of the ending "-leben" was slowly taken and means nothing more than "living" such as living together. At this time Langeleben was one of the bigger villages on the Elm, which in part is due to the excellent supply of clean water from the spring called "Schierpker Bach". During the 13th to 15th centuries, records note the existence of an Imperial Knighthood of Langeleben. Duke of Brunswick as feudal fiefdom owner of the land rights, allowed the assignment of a castle and rights to the Graf of Asseburg.

=== Reconstruction ===
In 1555 Henry of Asseburg (Heinrich von der Asseburg) took over the castle and village from Henry of Veltheim (Heinrich von Veltheim) on Destedt. The castle and most of the houses were empty and ruinous, reportedly without roofs and in some parts timbers. Outhouses and barns had fallen apart and were generally unusable. The new owner had the castle and an infrastructure of key houses (such as smithy, bakery, peat-cutter, brewery, etc.) built up around it, attracting appropriate tradesmen. In 1609, with the lessening of military significance over such locations, it gradually became recognised as a way-station along the trade route, and wagons were repaired and travelers given hospitality for a small sum. In 1605 there was already a significant number of cattle and horses; records show that there were 14 horses, 54 cattle, 83 pigs and about 200 sheep. Several small lakes were excavated and for the breeding of fish. By 1575 the owners of small farms in the surrounding area could boast of more than fourteen hides per 30 morgen of arable land, which today has reverted to common woodland.

=== Destruction and Hunting Lodge ===
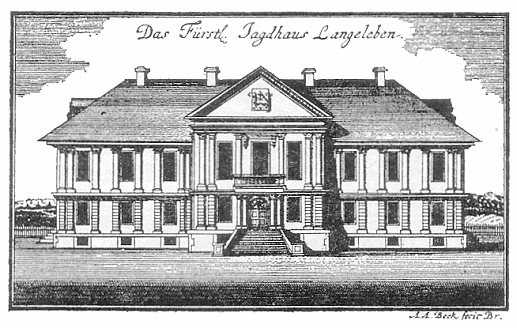
Hunting Lodge Langeleben, 1689–1830

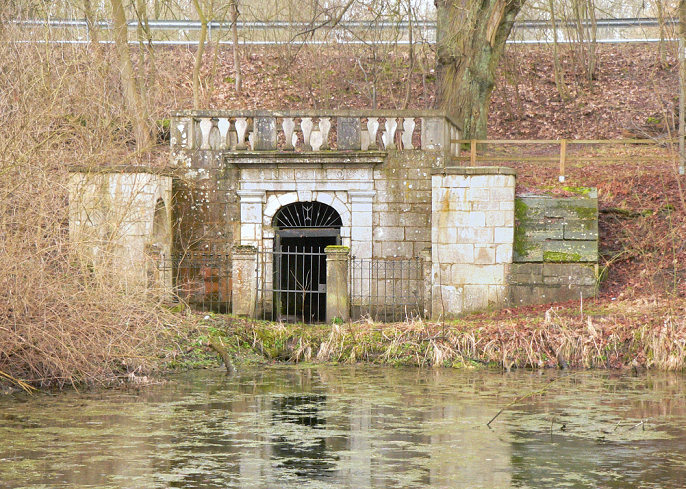
Spring House of the Schierpkebach

In 1626, during the thirty years' civil war troops involved in the Battle of Lutter and the seizure of Wolfenbüttel destroyed the castle and village with fire. In 1661 the Duke of Brunswick (Braunschweiger Herzog Anton Ulrich) acquired the ruins of Langeleben, believing them to be an ancient seat of power that he dearly wanted. These rights (on which he insisted) allowed him license to hunt over great parts of the Elm. The castle and village had only a few ruinous walls and a barn or two remaining, which he was not interested in because rather than live there, he wanted only to use the hunting rights that came with his title to the land. He even had trees planted to hide the remnants of the destroyed village and castle. After he died, his son, the arch-prince August Wilhelm of Braunschweig-Wolfenbüttel and Langeleben, being a passionate hunter, in 1689 ordered the construction of a hunting lodge and folly on the same site as the old one. It was a two-story, timbered building with overhanging balconies between the towers.

The building occupied some 114 by 54 feet (35 m × 16 m) floorspace. Around it were other buildings such as a dairy (1699), a large barn (1700), a large servants' quarters (1702), and a blacksmith's forge(1707). Behind the castle he had a massive "English Garden" constructed (1731). The spring of the Schierpkebach was fitted with a waterhouse (1705) providing water during the coldest of winters. Of great importance for that time was the stud farm that had up to 140 horses. The newly cleared land (1731) was surrounded by a six-kilometre fence until hedges grew to replace it.

=== Dukedom and castle life ===
In the 18th century, the dukes did not come for just the odd hunting day, but in fact spent weeks and even months at Langeleben. The hunt encompassed wide-ranging areas of the Elm and (due to close family ties with various duke's and the Prussian royal family) the "Preußen-Könige" Frederick William I of Prussia and Frederick II of Prussia were regular guests at Langeleben. Despite the high rank of the guests the permanent staff consisted of just 15 people

=== Renewed decay ===
In the middle of the 18th century (1754) the stud farm was moved to Brunswick and families of the nearby forestry workers were housed in the stalls. In 1799 the castle was given to the Forestry Master and was later used as a wax cloth factory. Over the years the substance of the building and its contents were allowed to decay and the building was soon beyond repair. In 1830 the ruins and a few outhouses were sold to a brick kiln owner for 3,000 Taler who had them torn down. In 1846 the local forestry started to replant trees on the site in order to restore it to its former state. The number of people living in and around Langeleben at that time amounted to about 115 people.

== 20th century ==
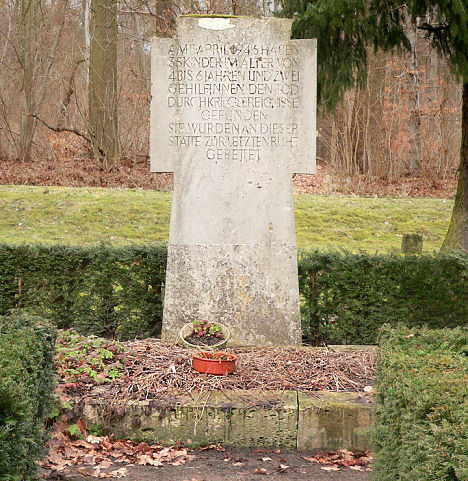
Monument

In 1926 the District Council of Helmstedt erected a children's recovery home in Langeleben. Today this building is an old people's home. The community of Langeleben was dissolved on 1 April 1936, as the low number of inhabitants made self governance unviable. The resident staff of the local pub and the children's home staff were then governed from the nearby village of Lelm (today also part of Königslutter am Elm). about this time that the last of the forestry workers' houses were pulled down.

In the closing days of the Second World War there was a tragic event. On 11 April 1945, just one day before the Allies took the area, an American low level attack aircraft flew over Langeleben. It destroyed the building of the local pub and also the children's home. Within a few minutes 53 people were dead, among these were 35 small children (between 4 and 6 years of age) and two nurses. The children had been evacuated from an orphan's home in Brunswick to this "safe" location to protect them from Allied bombing. The remaining dead were civilians who had been brought to this "safe" location by the Brunswick Police only the day before. They were trying to avoid being caught up between the advancing American forces and the retreating German forces.

The civilian victims of that fateful day, 11 April, were buried in Langeleben and in 1953 a monument and small garden erected to remember them.

In 1951 the German Social Youth Movement opened the Falk home for youth recovery and in 1959 opened another building to accommodate the growing numbers.

=== British Intercept Station ===
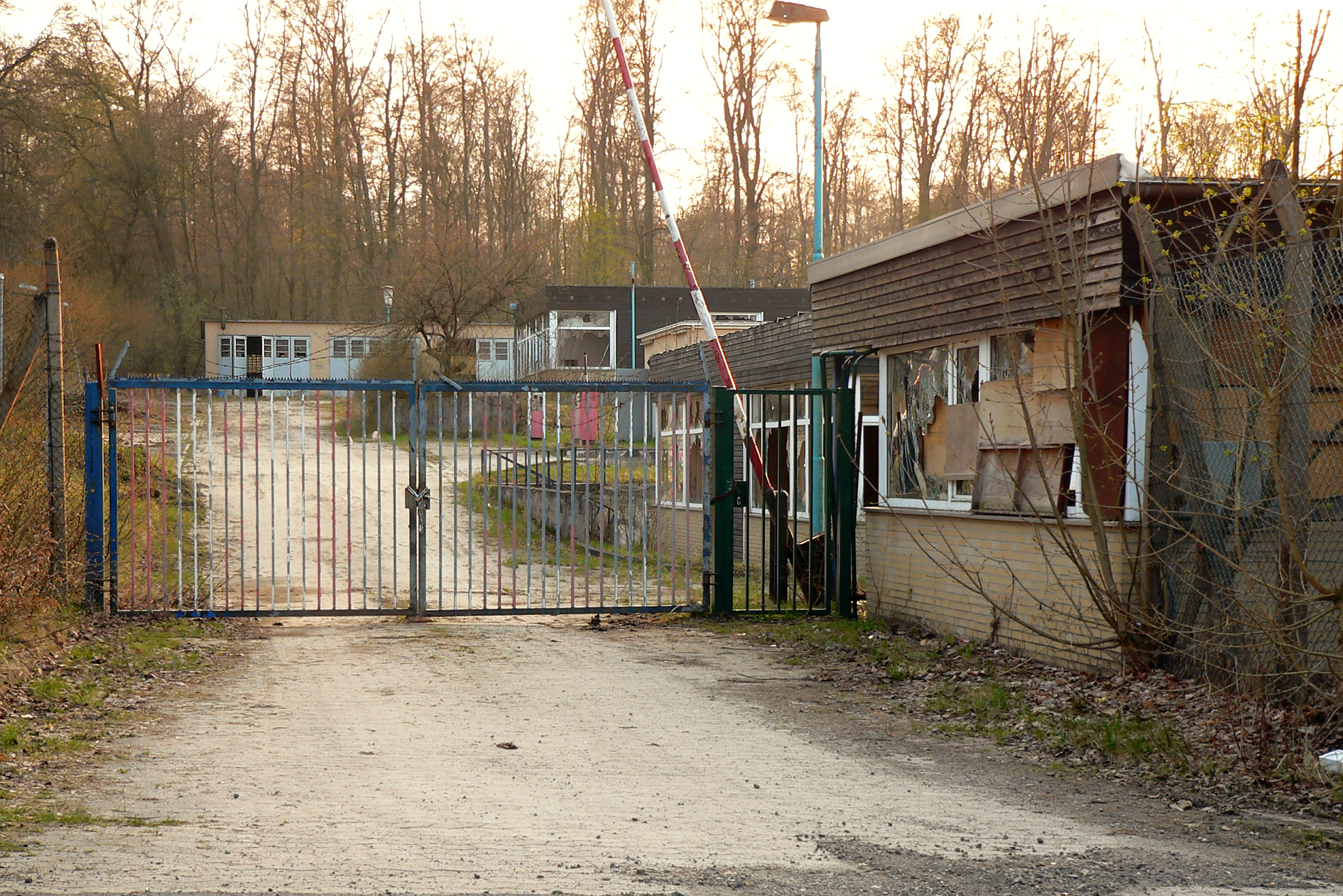
Entrance to the decaying Camp before demolition

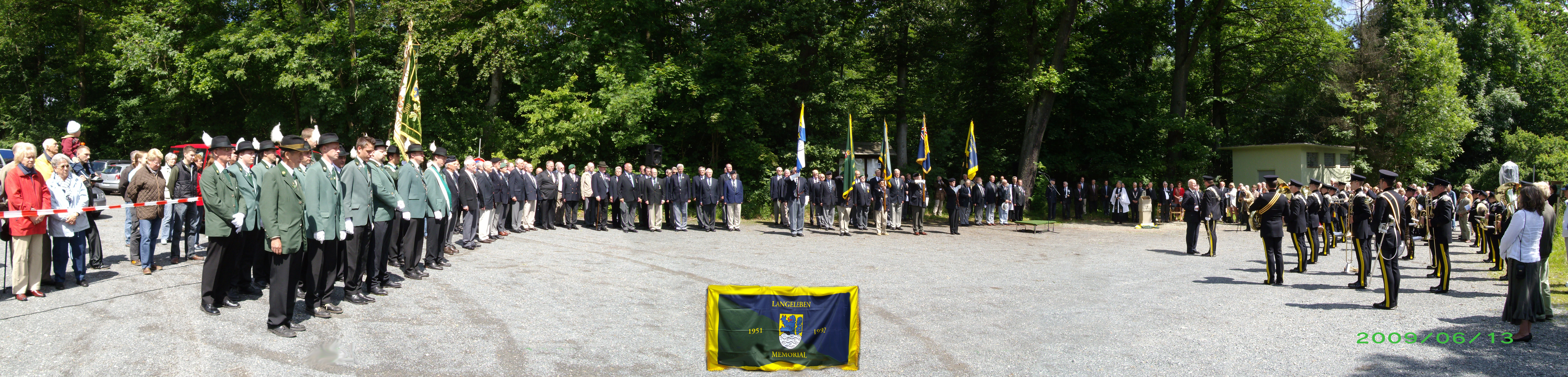
Formal blessing and unveiling of the Memorial Stone 13 June 2009

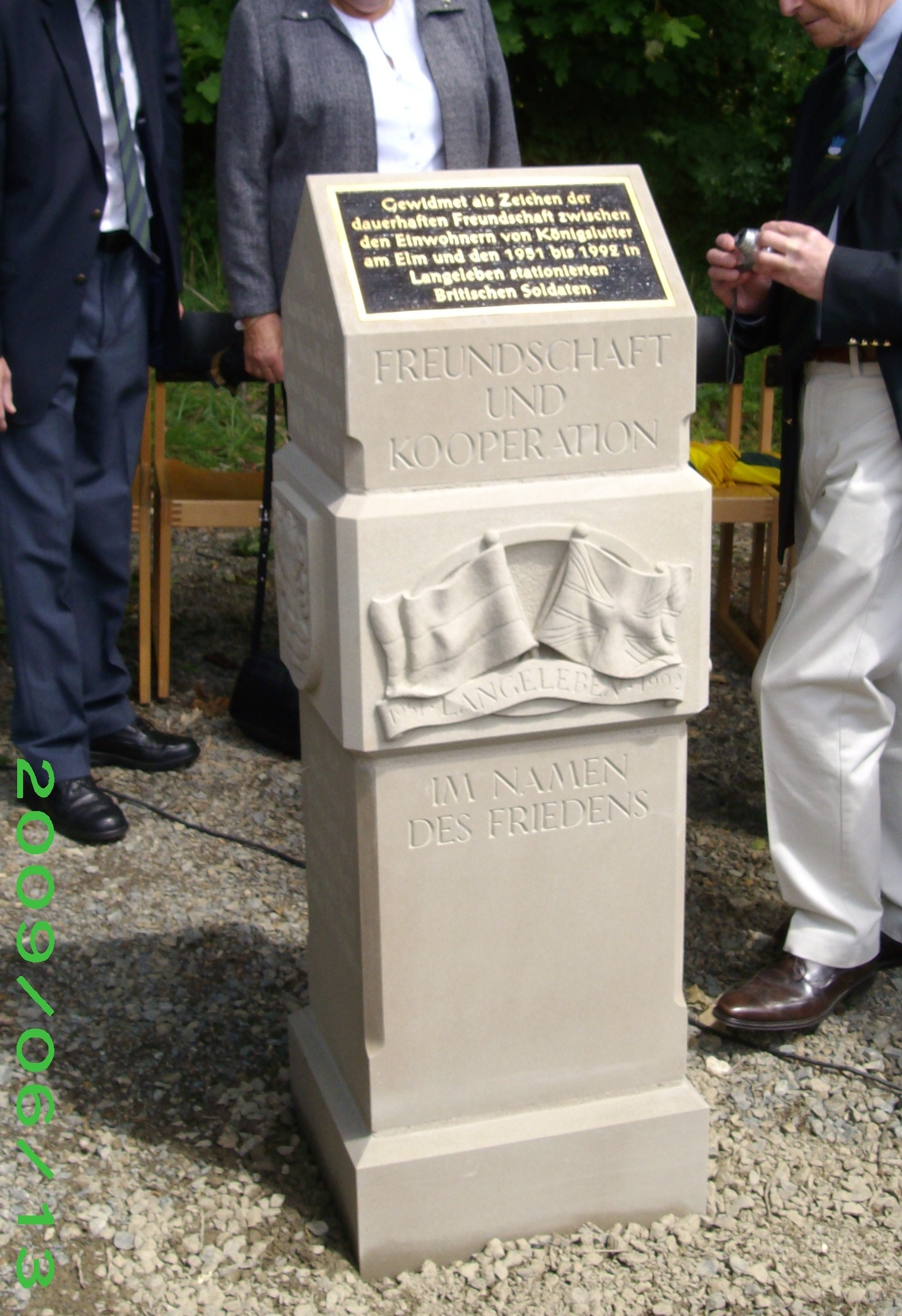
Memorial Stone Intercept Station "Langeleben" 13 June 2009

After the second world war and with the subsequent division of Germany, the British set up a static listening post at Langeleben to intercept and analyse the radio traffic of the Eastern Bloc and monitor the movements of the Warsaw Pact military forces. The location was ideal, being only a few Kilometres from the Iron Curtain Border. At first (in 1951) a temporary location was set up using specialised "QLR" vehicles and tents and nine members of the "101st Wireless Troop" Royal Signals. At first considered just a temporary facility, it soon became clear that the division of East and West Germany would possibly last a long time, and so, as staffing levels grew, wooden huts were erected. With the building of the Berlin Wall in August 1961, the clear need for a bigger and better "Permanent" facility at the location became apparent and so in 1963/64 the camp was totally rebuilt.

"Royal Signals Residents 1951 to 1992"

Year	Unit
1951 - 1959	101st Wireless Troop, deployed at first just 9 then over next years ever more signallers
1959	Growth in numbers of the "101st Wireless Troop" results in creation of "2 Squadron, 13th Signals Regiment"
1959–1967	2 Squadron, 13th Signals Regiment
1967–1977	225 Signal Squadron
1977–1992	14th Signal Regiment (Electronic Warfare)

Members of the Intelligence Corps were also stationed at Langleben throughout this period.

The military camp was officially known as "Anderson Barracks" and with the fall of the wall in 1989, and reunification, the need for a listening post in the middle of the newly merged Germany became superfluous. In 1992 the camp closed and the occupants were absorbed into various other units at diverse locations. The unused buildings were soon vandalised.

Since demolition in 2008 the buildings have all gone leaving only the roads and concrete foundations remaining to show what once stood there. The fence, gates and all other scrap metal have been removed and Nature is slowly taking over the site ~ as it has done so many times before during the preceding centuries.

On 13 June 2009 Members of the Langeleben Reunion, an association of former Royal Signals and Intelligence Corps soldiers who had been posted to Langeleben, were back on parade and after marching down from the demolished camp to a nearby clearing they paraded close to a memorial stone that has been erected to commemorate their service there between 1951 and 1992. The stone was carved by Paul Ellis, son of a former Langeleben Serviceman and a UK stonemason of some repute who is Stonemason in Lincoln Cathedral. He offered his services at cost and these were paid for by the members was officially blessed and unveiled.

=== Castle ruins ===
of the medieval Moated castle destroyed in 1626 (see picture at top) only a part of the end wall of a once 36-foot (11 m) high building is left; the other material having been taken to build the various buildings that came and went over the years. Some seven hundred "Fuder" (A medieval unit of about 15 hl volume) of large worked and shaped stones were taken to build part of the 1689 hunting lodge. A later erected church tower with two bells was built, but only the shape of the foundations on the ground gives physical evidence of its existence.

The details (Foundations or debris) of the former hamlet cannot be located and so these exist only in old records.

=== Friedwald-Cemetery ===
Since 2005 parts of the forest around Langeleben have been made into "Peaceful Woods" (Friedwald) as an alternative to conventional cemetery type burials. The cremated ashes of a deceased person are used to fertilise the roots of a newly planted tree (at a location agreed with the Forester). The tree carries a nameplate with the usual details that normally would be on the gravestone and is protected from being felled by a 99-year lease. The tree serves as a living memory of the deceased as well as a contribution to restoring nature.

== Further Elm ruins ==
On the back of the ridge of the Elm, there are many more medieval ruins and locations of similar castles and defences.

- The Reitlingsbefestigungen is a round stockade going back to possibly Roman times, in the middle of which in Reitlingstal on a small raised area the "Krimmelburg" was built as normal medieval Castle.
- The Elmsburg was an 11th Century built medieval castle that straddles the remains of a long forgotten early stockade ring defence at about 270 m high in the Schöninger-Forest above the town of Twieflingen.
- Castle Warburg was one of the more important medieval castles Turmhügelburg along the east side of the Elm ridge. Oral history reported that it had been stormed by enemy forces and totally destroyed in the year 1200, that archaeological excavations in the 1960s confirmed.
- A water castle of the German Order of Knights of the great lake (Großen Teich) in Reitlingstal, was later transformed and today is a large farm.

== Literature ==
- Natur-Erlebnispfad "Elfenpfad Langeleben". Freilicht und Erlebnismuseum Ostfalen (FEMO), ISBN 3-933380-10-3, Königslutter 2002.
- Hans Adolf Schultz: Burgen und Schlösser des Braunschweiger Landes, Braunschweig 1980, ISBN 3-87884-012-8
