= Starotitarovskaya =

Place in Krasnodar Krai, Russia

Starotitarovskaya Старотитаровская
- Stanitsa
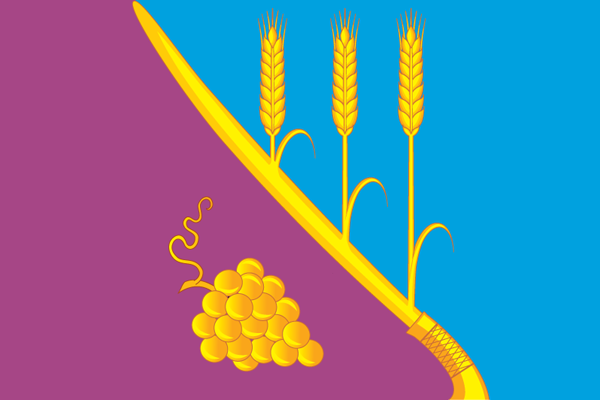
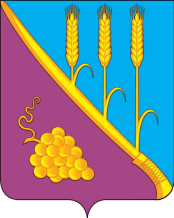
- Flag Coat of arms
- Interactive map of Starotitarovskaya
- Location of Starotitarovskaya Starotitarovskaya (Krasnodar Krai)
- Coordinates: 45°13′N 37°09′E
- Country: Russia
- Federal subject: Krasnodar Krai
- Administrative district: Temryuksky District
- Founded: 1794
- Elevation: 4 m (13 ft)

Population (2010 Census)
  - Total: 12,164
  - Estimate (2023): 13,310 (+9.4%)
- Time zone: UTC+3 (MSK)
- Postal code: 353530–353532
- Dialing code: +7 86148
- OKTMO ID: 03651422101

Starotitarovskaya (Russian: Старотитаровская) is a rural locality (a stanitsa) in the Temryuksky District of Krasnodar Krai, Russia. Population: 12,164 (2010 census); 12,193 (2002 census).
