= Wolf-Dietrich Wilcke =

German World War II flying ace and wing commander

- Born: 11 March 1913; Schrimm, Kingdom of Prussia, German Empire
- Died: 23 March 1944 (aged 31) near Schöppenstedt, Free State of Brunswick, Nazi Germany
- Cause of death: Killed in action
- Burial place: Cemetery in Mönchengladbach-Holt
- Relatives: Friedrich von Scotti (stepfather)
- Military career
- Allegiance: Nazi Germany
- Branch: Reichswehr; Luftwaffe; Condor Legion
- Service years: 1934–1944
- Rank: Oberst
- Nickname: "Fürst"
- Units: J/88, JG 53, JG 3
- Commands: III./JG 53, JG 3
- Conflicts: See battles Spanish Civil War World War II: Battle of France; Battle of Britain; Operation Barbarossa; North African campaign; Siege of Malta; Eastern Front; Defense of the Reich †
- Awards: Knight's Cross of the Iron Cross with Oak Leaves and Swords

Wolf-Dietrich Wilcke (11 March 1913 – 23 March 1944) was a German Luftwaffe pilot during World War II, a fighter ace credited with 162 enemy aircraft shot down in 732 combat missions. He claimed most of his victories over the Eastern Front, and 25 over the Western Front, including four four-engined bombers.

Born in Schrimm in the Province of Posen, Wilcke volunteered for military service in the Reichswehr of Nazi Germany in 1934. (Note: From 1919, Germany's national defense force was known as the Reichswehr. That name was dropped in favor of Wehrmacht on 16 March 1935.) Initially serving in the Heer (Army), he transferred to the Luftwaffe (Air Force) in 1935. Following flight training, he was posted to Jagdgeschwader "Richthofen" (Fighter Wing "Richthofen") in April 1936. After an assignment as a fighter pilot instructor, he volunteered for service with the Condor Legion during the Spanish Civil War in early 1939. After his return from Spain, he was appointed Staffelkapitän (squadron leader) of the 7. Staffel (7th squadron) of Jagdgeschwader 53 (JG 53—53rd Fighter Wing). Following the outbreak of World War II, he claimed his first aerial victory on 7 November 1939. On 18 May 1940, during the Battle of France, he was shot down and taken prisoner of war. After the armistice with France, he returned from captivity and was appointed Gruppenkommandeur (group commander) of III. Gruppe (3rd group) of JG 53 during the Battle of Britain, claiming 10 victories over England.

Wilcke then fought in the aerial battles of Operation Barbarossa, the German invasion of the Soviet Union. There, after 25 aerial victories, he was awarded the Knight's Cross of the Iron Cross on 6 August 1941. In September 1941, he relocated with his group to the Mediterranean Theater, where he claimed further victories. At the end of May 1942, he was transferred to the Stab (headquarters unit) of Jagdgeschwader 3 (JG 3—3rd Fighter Wing) "Udet", and in August he was appointed its Geschwaderkommodore (wing commander). Following his 100th aerial victory on 6 September, he received the Knight's Cross of the Iron Cross with Oak Leaves. During the Battle of Stalingrad, on 17 December, he claimed his 150th aerial victory. On 23 December 1942, he was awarded the Knight's Cross of the Iron Cross with Oak Leaves and Swords, his total now 155 aerial victories.

After the presentation of the Swords to his Knight's Cross, he was officially banned from operational flying. Occasionally he still flew combat missions and on 23 March 1944, flying in defense of the Reich, he claimed his 162nd and last aerial victory and was killed in action by United States Army Air Forces long-range P-51 Mustang fighters near Schöppenstedt, in Lower Saxony.

== Early life and career ==
Wilcke was born on 11 March 1913 at Schrimm in the Province of Posen, part of the Kingdom of Prussia at the time, now Śrem in the Greater Poland Voivodeship, Poland. He was the son of a Hauptmann (captain) of Infanterie-Regiment 47 (47th Infantry Regiment), Hans Wilcke, who died of pneumonia when Wilcke was just four weeks old. His mother, Hertha von Schuckmann, married again on 14 June 1919. In 1931, Wilcke was arrested for attending a then-illegal demonstration of the Nazi Party. Although his loyalty to the Nazi cause is emphasized multiple times in his personal military files, according to biographers Prien and Stemmer, he was a firm opponent of the National Socialist regime; later in his career, for a time after taking command of III. Gruppe (3rd group) of Jagdgeschwader 53 (JG 53—53rd Fighter Wing), (Note: For an explanation of Luftwaffe unit designations see Organization of the Luftwaffe during World War II.) he had the Swastikas on his unit's aircraft painted over. He volunteered for military service in the Reichswehr after receiving his Abitur (diploma). He joined Artillerie-Regiment 6 (6th Artillery Regiment) in Minden as a Fahnenjunker (officer cadet) on 1 April 1934. His legal guardian and stepfather, Friedrich von Scotti, also served in this regiment.

As a Fähnrich (officer candidate), Wilcke was posted to the Kriegsschule (war school) in Dresden on 1 October 1934. On 1 November 1935, he was transferred to the newly emerging Luftwaffe holding the rank of Oberfähnrich (senior officer candidate). On 20 April 1936, while serving at the flight school in Perleberg, he was promoted to Leutnant (second lieutenant). On 15 October he was transferred to Jagdgeschwader "Richthofen" (Fighter Wing "Richthofen"), also known as Jagdgeschwader 132 (JG 132—132nd Fighter Wing), named after the World War I fighter ace Manfred von Richthofen and forerunner of Jagdgeschwader 2 (JG 2—2nd Fighter Wing) "Richthofen". There he excelled as a pilot and showed exceptional leadership ability, and was sent as a fighter pilot instructor to the Jagdfliegerschule (fighter pilot school) in Werneuchen in the second half of 1937.

In March 1939, Wilcke volunteered for service with the Condor Legion during the Spanish Civil War. For a few weeks, he flew with 1. Staffel (1st squadron) of Jagdgruppe 88 (J/88—88th Fighter Group) claiming no aerial victories. He was awarded the Spanish Cross in Bronze with Swords (Spanienkreuz in Bronze mit Schwertern) for his service in Spain. In Spain he became friends with Werner Mölders, and when Mölders was appointed Gruppenkommandeur (group commander) of the newly created III. Gruppe of JG 53, he selected Wilcke as Staffelkapitän (squadron leader) of the 7. Staffel (7th squadron) of JG 53.

== World War II ==
World War II in Europe began on Friday, 1 September 1939, when German forces invaded Poland. Wilcke, who at the time was still a member of 3. Staffel (3rd squadron) of JG 53, flew missions over Poland. He claimed his first aerial victory on 7 November 1939, over the Western Front when he shot down an Armée de l'Air (French Air Force) Potez 630, a twin-engined fighter, near Völklingen during the Phoney War. For this achievement he was awarded the Iron Cross 2nd Class (Eisernes Kreuz 2. Klasse) on 25 November 1939.

From 2–16 January 1940, Wilcke and other pilots from III. Gruppe went on a ski vacation to the Vorarlberg. On 11 March 1940, he shot down another Potez at an altitude of 7,000 meters (23,000 feet) near the "three-nations-corner" north of Metz. He claimed his third victory at 2:55 p.m. on 25 March. 7. Staffel engaged a flight of Morane-Saulnier M.S.406 at 4,000 m (13,000 ft). In the resulting aerial battle, Wilcke shot down one of the Moranes over Diedenhofen.

=== Battle of France and Britain ===
The Battle of France, the German invasion of France and the Low Countries, began on 10 May 1940. On 18 May 1940, he engaged in aerial combat with eight French Curtiss P-36 Hawk fighter aircraft and was shot down west of Rethel. His victor may have been sous lieutenant Camille Plubeau. Wilcke bailed out and was taken prisoner of war. Following the armistice with France, he and Mölders, who had also been a prisoner of war, returned to the unit on 30 June 1940. Wilcke was promoted to Hauptmann the next day and again took command of 7. Staffel. On 11 July 1940, he was awarded the Iron Cross 1st Class (Eisernes Kreuz 1. Klasse). III. Gruppe had moved to Rennes Airfield on 22 June where they patrolled the costal area of Brittany. On 10 July, the Gruppe relocated to an airfield at Lanvéoc-Poulmic, sometimes referred to as Brest-South airfield. Here, they flew their first combat missions during the Battle of Britain on 11 August, escorting Junkers Ju 87 dive bombers attacking British shipping.

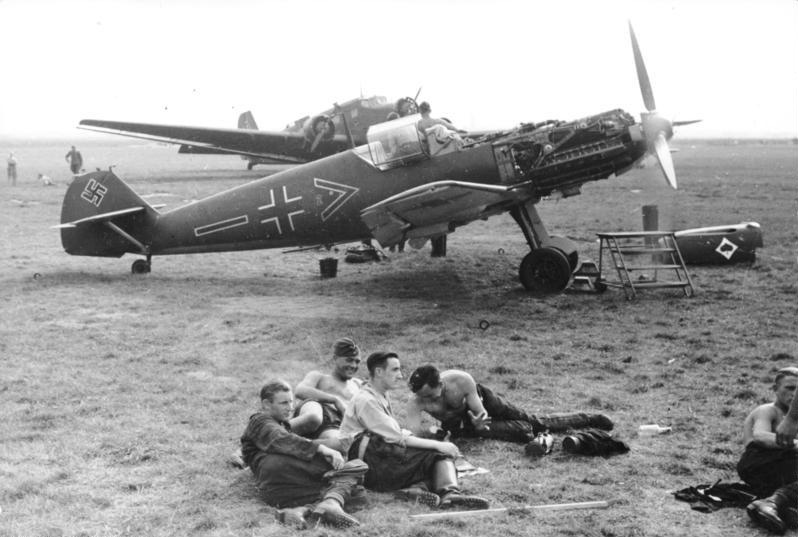
A Messerschmitt Bf 109 E-1 of JG 53, similar to those flown by Wilcke

On 13 August 1940, during the Battle of Britain, Wilcke replaced Hauptmann Harro Harder as Gruppenkommandeur of the III. Gruppe. (Note: Harro Harder was the brother of Jürgen Harder.) Harder had last been seen at 1:35 p.m. on 12 August and was reported as missing in action following combat east of the Isle of Wight. On the day of his appointment, Wilcke almost lost his life as well, when he was forced to bail out after engine failure over the English Channel. He was rescued that night by a Dornier Do 18 flying boat. On 24 August, III. Gruppe began its relocation from Brest to Le Touquet Airfield, near Étaples and Le Touquet in the Pas-de-Calais on the English Channel. The Gruppe stayed here until 19 December. III. Gruppe flew a bomber escort mission targeting London on 30 August. Wilcke destroyed a barrage balloon on the morning mission and claimed his fourth victory, a Supermarine Spitfire near Dover during his second mission of the day. On 1 September 1940, on another bomber escort mission that started at 11:20 a.m., Wilcke claimed his fifth victory, a Hawker Hurricane, south of London. He claimed his sixth victory, probably a Fairey Swordfish biplane, on 11 September over the Channel between Dover and Calais.

On 15 September 1940, also known as Battle of Britain Day, III. Gruppe engaged 20 to 30 Royal Air Force (RAF) fighters south of London. In the resulting combat, Wilcke claimed the destruction of his second Hurricane. Two days later, on a mission that began at 4:35 p.m., Wilcke achieved his ninth victory, another Hurricane. He claimed his tenth victory, again a Hurricane, on a mission targeting the London area that took off at 11:15 a.m. on 20 September. On the last day of September 1940, he claimed two more victories to bring his total to 12; the action took place during his second mission of the day, which began at 1:45 p.m., escorting Dornier Do 17s to London. In combat with RAF Spitfires, Wilcke claimed his 13th victory at 11:45 a.m. on 10 October 1940, his final of the Battle of Britain. In recognition of these achievements, he was awarded the Honor Goblet of the Luftwaffe (Ehrenpokal der Luftwaffe) on 1 April 1941.

=== Operation Barbarossa ===
On 8 June 1941, the bulk of JG 53's air elements moved via Jever, in northern Germany, to Mannheim-Sandhofen. There the aircraft were given a maintenance overhaul prior to moving east. On 12 June, III. Gruppe was ordered to transfer to a forward airfield at Sobolewo. On 21 June, the Geschwaderkommodore (wing commander) of JG 53 and its Gruppenkommandeure were summoned to nearby Suwałki, where Generalfeldmarschall (field marshal) Albert Kesselring gave the final instructions for the upcoming attack. Wilcke briefed his pilots that evening.

On 22 June, the Geschwader crossed into Soviet airspace to support Operation Barbarossa, the invasion of the Soviet Union, which opened the Eastern Front. III. Gruppe took off on its first mission at 3:20 a.m. with the Gruppenstab (headquarters unit) and 7. Staffel targeting Soviet airfields at Alytus and Oranji. Wilcke shot down three Polikarpov I-15 biplane fighter aircraft. The second mission of the day by III. Gruppe was a Stuka escort mission to Grodno at 6:00 a.m., during which Wilcke claimed another victory. He led another attack at 4:10 p.m.; while strafing airfields, he claimed his fifth aerial victory of the day, an "ace-in-a-day" achievement, taking his total to 18.

On 25 June 1941, JG 53 was relocated with III. Gruppe arriving at Vilnius at 8:30 am. The same day, Wilcke was slightly injured when he collided with another aircraft during takeoff. He claimed his 19th victory on the evening of 30 June 1941, flying a combat air patrol into the Barysaw area. Wilcke was ordered to form "Gefechtsverband Wilcke" ("Battle Group Wilcke") on 1 July 1941. He commanded his III. Gruppe and II. Gruppe of Jagdgeschwader 52 (JG 52—52nd Fighter Wing) to counter-attack Soviet bombers. On 9 July, Wilcke destroyed a Petlyakov Pe-2 ground-attack aircraft. He claimed a victory on 25 July during fighter escort missions in the Vyazma area. On 29 July 1941, III. Gruppe provided fighter cover for the German armored spearheads in the Dukhovshchina area. During this mission, Wilcke claimed another victory. The next day, over the spearheads at Yartsevo-Bely, Wilcke shot down a Polikarpov I-180 fighter. He was awarded the Knight's Cross of the Iron Cross (Ritterkreuz des Eisernen Kreuzes) on 6 August 1941 for 25 victories. Both Wilcke and Leutnant Herbert Schramm were decorated by Kesselring on 9 August 1941.

On 23 August 1941, the 9th Army began its assault on the Soviet forces in the Velikiye Luki area. Wilcke claimed two aerial victories while supporting these operations. III. Gruppe began returning to Germany in early October 1941. The air element left the Soviet Union on 4 October, while the ground units were transported back by train to Mannheim on 13 October. Since 22 June 1941, III. Gruppe had claimed 769 aerial victories for losing 6 pilots killed, 7 missing in action, 2 captured and 12 wounded.

=== North Africa and Malta ===
After its return to Germany, III. Gruppe was deployed to the Mediterranean Theater. The ground elements of III. Gruppe arrived in Catania in Sicily on 28 November 1941. Wilcke and his adjutant Jürgen Harder arrived on 2 December, with the rest of the Gruppe arriving the next day. On 6 December 1941, III. Gruppe was ordered to move to Timimi in Libya. Wilcke claimed his 34th aerial victory on 11 December, during a fighter escort mission for Junkers Ju 88 bombers attacking Bir Hakeim.

III. Gruppe relocated back to Sicily on 17 December 1941 for operations in the siege of Malta. The island of Malta had a strategically important position in the Mediterranean Sea. With the opening of a new front in North Africa in mid-1940, British air and sea forces based on the island could attack Axis ships transporting vital supplies and reinforcements from Europe to North Africa. To counter this threat, the Luftwaffe and the Regia Aeronautica (Italian Royal Air Force) conducted bombing raids to neutralize the RAF defenses and the ports. During the siege, Wilcke claimed four victories over RAF fighters in April–May 1942. He claimed his first victory during the siege, and 35th overall, over a Spitfire fighter on 2 April 1942. His 36th aerial victory on 22 April may have been Hurricane (Z4011) "B" of No. 185 Squadron flown by Pilot Officer "Sonny" Ormrod, who was killed in the engagement. On 12 May 1942, III. Gruppe destroyed nine Spitfires, among them one by Wilcke.

=== Wing commander of JG 3 ===
On 18 May 1942, Wilcke was transferred to Jagdgeschwader 3 "Udet" (JG 3—3rd Fighter Wing), named after the World War I fighter ace Ernst Udet. Operating on the Eastern Front, Wilcke became a Geschwaderkommodore of JG 3 "Udet" on 11 August, replacing Oberst (Colonel) Günther Lützow, who was posted to the staff of the General der Jagdflieger (General of Fighters) as Inspector of the Day Fighters on the Eastern Front. Operating from the Chuguyev Airfield, JG 3 "Udet" saw combat in the Kharkov area, present-day Kharkiv, during the Second Battle of Kharkov. On 26 June 1942, JG 3 "Udet" was assembled at Schtschigry on the southern sector of the Eastern Front for the upcoming summer offensive, supporting the Wehrmacht's advance towards Stalingrad. In the following months, JG 3 "Udet" was based at airfields at Gorshechnoye, Olkhovatka, Millerovo, Nowy-Cholan, Frolovo, Tuzov and Pitomnik.

Emblem of JG 3 "Udet"

On 13 June 1942, Wilcke claimed his first victory with JG 3 "Udet", shooting down a Lavochkin-Gorbunov-Gudkov LaGG-3 fighter for his 39th victory. He followed this with another LaGG-3 on 22 June, and a LaGG-3 and a Polikarpov R-5 reconnaissance bomber on 24 June 1942. On 3 July 1942, he claimed three Douglas Boston medium bombers, followed by two LaGG-3s and another Boston the next day. He became an "ace-in-a-day" again on 6 July, shooting down a Bell P-39 Airacobra, a LaGG-3, an R-5 and three Hurricanes. Three days later, he shot down two Ilyushin Il-2 Sturmovik ground-attack aircraft and, on 10 July, four more Bostons. The next day, he claimed another R-5 and two Mikoyan-Gurevich MiG-1 fighters. On 12 July, he again claimed an R-5 and two LaGG-3s before he shot down another LaGG-3 on 18 July. On 24 July he was credited with a Polikarpov I-153 biplane fighter and two days later two Hurricanes and two Pe-2s. On both 27 and 28 July, he claimed victory over a LaGG-3, his last victory in July 1942.

Wilcke's first victories in August 1942, a Sukhoi Su-2 light bomber followed by two LaGG-3s, occurred on 5 and 6 August. On 9 August he filed a victory claim for an unknown aircraft type, bringing his "score" to 79 aerial victories. He took command of JG 3 "Udet" and achieved his first victory as Geschwaderkommodore on 12 August, again over an unknown type of aircraft. He claimed eight further victories of unknown types: two on 13 August, one on 17 August, three on 20 August, and two on 23 August. His first victory on 26 August was identified as a Yakovlev Yak-7 fighter; the other two that day were again of unknown types. Another series of unidentified aircraft shot down followed. He claimed one aircraft destroyed on 28 August, one more on 30 August and four on 31 August, taking his total to 96 aerial victories by the end of August 1942. Wilcke claimed his next two victories on 3 September and two more on 6 September, all four of unknown types of aircraft. This brought his total to 100 aerial victories. Wilcke was the 20th Luftwaffe pilot to achieve the century mark. On 9 September 1942, he became the 122nd officer or soldier of the Wehrmacht honored with the Knight's Cross of the Iron Cross with Oak Leaves (Ritterkreuz des Eisernen Kreuzes mit Eichenlaub).

=== Battle of Stalingrad ===
From 10–19 September 1942, Wilcke claimed another series of victories over aircraft of unknown type, which included one on 10 September, one on 12 September, four on 18 September, and two on 19 September. On 16 September 1942, the Soviets launched an offensive north of Stalingrad. Wilcke led about 40 serviceable German fighters against the Soviet 8 Vozdyshnaya Armiya (8 VA—8th Air Army), 16 Vozdyshnaya Armiya (16 VA—16th Air Army), and 102 Istrebitel'naya Aviatsionnaya Diviziya Protivo-Vozdushnaya Oborona (102 IAD PVO—Fighter Aviation Division of the Home Air Defense) over Stalingrad. At the time, Wilcke often flew with Hauptmann Walther Dahl as his wingman. On 20 September 1942, Wilcke shot down two LaGG-3s. Two days later, he shot down six Yakovlev Yak-1 fighters over Stalingrad, his third "ace-in-day" feat, taking his total to 116 aerial victories. It is possible that one of his opponents was Leytenant (Second Lieutenant) Nikolai Karnachyonok of 434 Istrebitel'nyy Aviatsionyy Polk (434 IAP—434th Fighter Aviation Regiment), who was killed in action that day and was posthumously made a Hero of the Soviet Union. (Note: IAP—Istrebitelny Aviatsionny Polk (Fighter Aviation Regiment—Истребительный Авиационный Полк))

The Geschwaderstab (headquarters unit) was based at the Pitomnik Airfield from 23 September to 21 November 1942. There Wilcke directed fighter operations for the Battle of Stalingrad. During the previous offensive towards Stalingrad, the Geschwaderstab of JG 3 "Udet" had claimed 137 victories, of which 97 victories were credited to Wilcke. While based at Pitomnik, Wilcke claimed four victories on 24 September, one on 25 September, three on 28 September, four on 29 September, one on 3 October, and two more on 24 October. On 25 and 26 October he claimed one victory on each day and his final two while based at Pitomnik on 1 November 1942, taking his personal total to 135 victories. For these achievements, he received the German Cross in Gold (Deutsches Kreuz in Gold), awarded on 3 November 1942.

In the encirclement's aftermath of the 6th Army on 23 November 1942, the Geschwaderstab was moved to Morozovskaya-West, outside the Stalingrad pocket. Wilcke organized fighter escort missions for the transport aircraft delivering supplies for the 6th Army. Pressed by the advancing Soviet armored spearheads, Morozovskaya-West had to be abandoned by the Geschwaderstab on 23 December, and the aircraft were moved to Morozovskaya-South, which was not yet threatened by the Soviet Army. On 3 January 1943, this airfield had to be abandoned as well, and the Geschwaderstab was relocated to Tazinskaya; there it remained until the fighting over the Stalingrad pocket ended. During this period the Geschwaderstab claimed 25 victories, 21 by Wilcke and 4 by Dahl, for the loss in action of two pilots.

Wilcke claimed two victories on 24 November 1942, an Il-2 Sturmovik and a Yak-1, his first victories to support the Stalingrad pocket. On 30 November he claimed the destruction of three aircraft of unknown type, one more on 2 December, and three more on 8 December. Four victories claimed on 12 December, one Lavochkin La-5 and three Yak-1s, took his total to 148 aerial victories. Wilcke became the fourth German fighter pilot to achieve 150 aerial victories in combat. (Note: The first pilot to claim 150 aerial victories was Gordon Gollob who achieved the milestone on 29 August 1942. Hermann Graf reached that total on 4 September 1942 while Hans-Joachim Marseille did so on 15 September 1942.) He achieved this mark on 17 December 1942, claiming victories 149–151. The next day he claimed victory over three more aircraft. Following this 154th victory, he was awarded the Knight's Cross of the Iron Cross with Oak Leaves and Swords (Ritterkreuz des Eisernen Kreuzes mit Eichenlaub und Schwertern) on 23 December 1943, the 23rd member of the Wehrmacht to be so honored. Along with the Swords came the ban from flying further operational combat missions. Although banned from flying, (Note: The Oberkommando der Luftwaffe (Air Force High Command), fearing the loss of such an experienced fighter unit leader, banned Wilcke from flying further combat missions.) he was credited with two more victories on the Eastern Front: a Yak-1 on 28 December and an aircraft of an unknown type on 5 January 1943.

In March 1943, Wilcke led Geschwaderstab and II. and III. Gruppe during operations against the Kuban bridgehead as part of the IV. Fliegerkorps (4th Air Corps). In early May 1943, the Geschwaderstab was ordered out of action and returned to München-Gladbach, present-day Mönchengladbach. Wilcke had only the Geschwaderstab and I. Gruppe under his effective command, and no further combat missions were flown until October 1943.

=== Defense of the Reich and death ===
Wilcke was promoted to Oberst on 1 December 1943 and requested permission to fly operationally and lead his Geschwader from the air. In February 1944, although still officially banned from flying operations, Wilcke ignored the order and flew several missions leading his Stabsschwarm against the United States Army Air Forces (USAAF) in Defense of the Reich missions. He claimed his 157th victory, over a Lockheed P-38 Lightning, on 10 February and his 158th, over a Consolidated B-24 Liberator, on 24 February. He shot down two Boeing B-17 Flying Fortress bombers on 4 March 1944, his 159th and 160th aerial victories. On 6 March, his Bf 109 G-6 was crippled in aerial combat, and he made an emergency landing at Neuruppin. Combat on 6 March cost both sides heavy losses. The Eighth Air Force lost 75 four-engined bombers and 14 escort fighters; the Luftwaffe lost 65 aircraft; 36 German pilots were killed and 27 wounded.

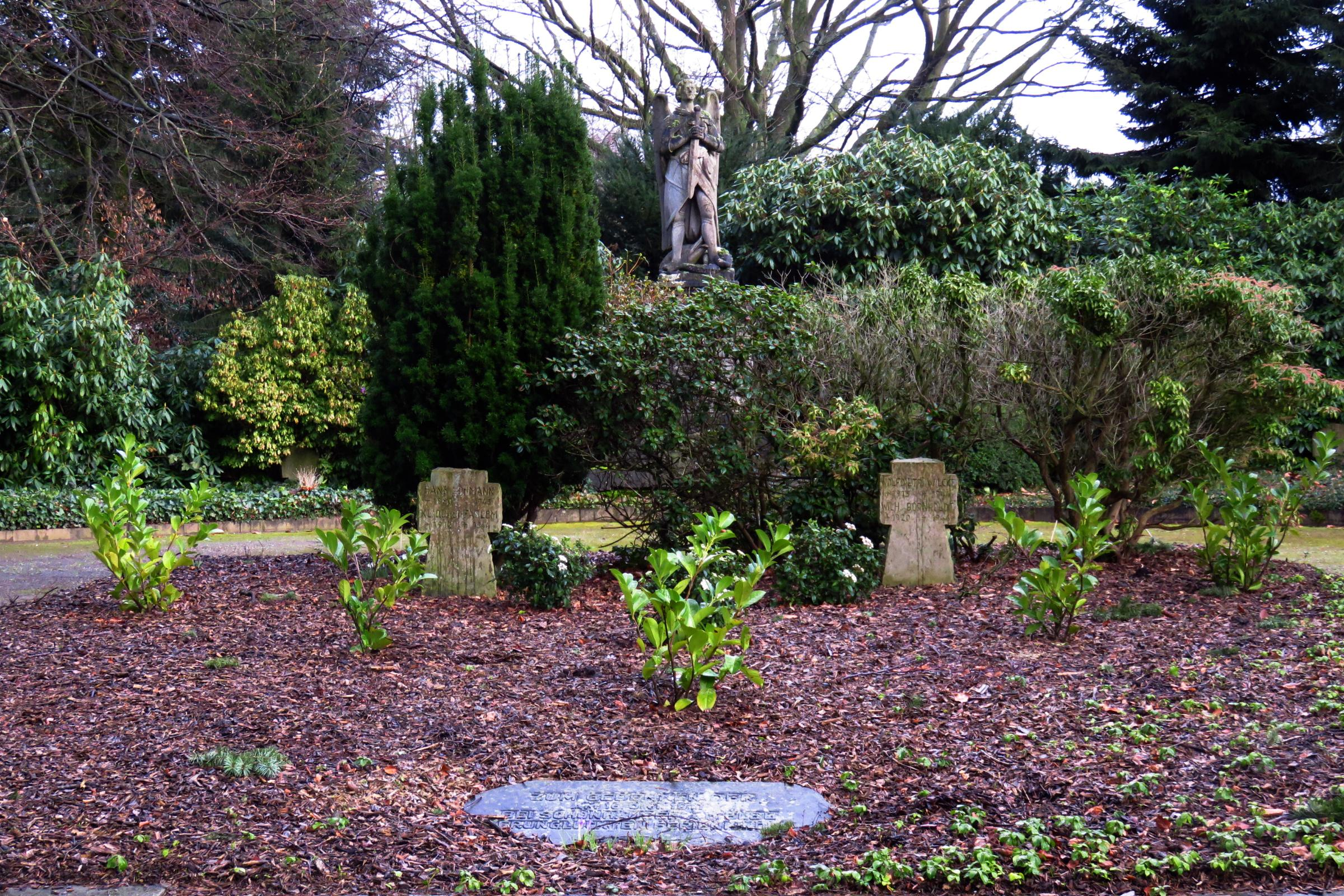
Wilcke's grave (right) on the honor section of the cemetery in Mönchengladbach-Holt.

On 23 March 1944, Wilcke led JG 3 "Udet" against a USAAF bomber formation near Braunschweig. On this day, the USAAF was attacking aircraft factories at Braunschweig and other targets of opportunity in Münster, Osnabrück, and Achmer. The Eighth Air Force had committed 768 B-17s and B-24s bombers to this attack, supported by 841 long-range fighters. The Luftwaffe countered this attack with 13 day fighter Gruppen, mustering 259 fighters on this day. Following combat, the Luftwaffe claimed the destruction of 51 enemy aircraft, including 44 four-engined bombers. The Luftwaffe suffered 16 pilots killed and six wounded, as well as 33 aircraft lost. The USAAF reported the loss of 29 bombers and 5 escort fighters while claiming 62 German aircraft shot down and another 2 destroyed on the ground.

During this engagement, Wilcke shot down a B-17 Flying Fortress bomber and a North American P-51 Mustang fighter, but was then shot down in his Bf 109 G-6 (Werknummer 160 613—factory number) near Schöppenstedt. It is assumed that the victors were Captain Don Gentile and Captain John T. Godfrey of the 4th Fighter Group. By this date, Wilcke had claimed 162 enemy aircraft in 732 combat missions. Wilcke had been nicknamed "Fürst" (prince) by his comrades on account of his attitude towards his men and paternal sense of responsibility, and his being very conscious of his style and appearance and therefore wearing a very expensive and custom tailored leather coat. His funeral ceremony was held at the airfield in Mönchengladbach (then "München Gladbach"). The funeral ceremony was attended by his stepfather, among others. Wilcke was buried in the honor section of the cemetery in Mönchengladbach-Holt next to the grave of Klaus Quaet-Faslem. Major Friedrich-Karl Müller succeeded Wilcke as commander of JG 3.

== Summary of career ==
=== Aerial victory claims ===
According to US historian David T. Zabecki, Wilcke was credited with 162 aerial victories. Mathews and Foreman, authors of Luftwaffe Aces — Biographies and Victory Claims, researched the German Federal Archives and found records for 155 aerial victory claims, plus nine further unconfirmed claims. This figure includes 138 aerial victories on the Eastern Front and 17 over the Western Allies.

Victory claims were logged to a map-reference (PQ = Planquadrat), for example "PQ 4932". The Luftwaffe grid map (Jägermeldenetz) covered all of Europe, western Russia, and North Africa and was composed of rectangles measuring 15 minutes of latitude by 30 minutes of longitude, an area of about 360 square miles (930 km^{2}). These sectors were then subdivided into 36 smaller units to give a location area 3 km × 4 km (1.9 mi × 2.5 mi) in size.

Chronicle of aerial victories
This and the ♠ (Ace of spades) indicates those aerial victories which made Wilcke an "ace-in-a-day", a term which designates a fighter pilot who has shot down five or more airplanes in a single day. This and the – (dash) indicates unconfirmed aerial victory claims for which Wilcke did not receive credit. This along with the * (asterisk) indicates an Herausschuss (separation shot)—a severely damaged heavy bomber forced to separate from his combat box which was counted as an aerial victory. This and the ? (question mark) indicates information discrepancies listed by Prien, Stemmer, Rodeike, Bock, Mathews and Foreman.
Claim	Date	Time	Type	Location	Claim	Date	Time	Type	Location
– 7. Staffel of Jagdgeschwader 53 – "Phoney War" — 26 September 1939 – 9 May 1940
1	7 November 1939	15:05	Potez 63	Völklingen	2	11 March 1940	17:45	Potez	6 km (3.7 mi) north-northeast of Sierck
—	2 March 1940	—	Hurricane	south of Bitche	3? (Note: According to Mathews and Foreman this claim is unconfirmed.)	25 March 1940	14:55	M.S.406	southwest of Saarbrücken
– Stab III. Gruppe of Jagdgeschwader 53 – At the Channel and over England — 26 June 1940 – 7 June 1941
4	31 August 1940	20:35	Spitfire	vicinity of Dover	10	20 September 1940	12:40	Hurricane	northwest of Dungeness
5	1 September 1940	12:25	Spitfire		— (Note: This unconfirmed claim is listed by Mathews and Foreman, but not by Prien, Stemmer, Rodeike and Bock.)	27 September 1940	—	Spitfire	southwest of London
6	11 September 1940	18:40	biplane (Albacore)	Dover/Calais	11	30 September 1940	11:58	Spitfire	15 km (9.3 mi) south of Dungeness
7	15 September 1940	13:00	Spitfire	London	12	30 September 1940	14:55	Spitfire	Dungeness/Hastings
8	15 September 1940	15:15	Spitfire	southwest of London	13	10 October 1940	11:40	Spitfire	Thames Estuary; Folkestone
9	17 September 1940	16:50	Hurricane	Ashford					
– Stab III. Gruppe of Jagdgeschwader 53 – Operation Barbarossa — 22 June – 4 October 1941
14♠	22 June 1941	04:00	I-15		25	30 July 1941	09:05	I-18 (MiG-1)	Yartsevo/Bely
15♠	22 June 1941	04:05? (Note: According to Mathews and Foreman claimed at 04:05.)	I-15		26	8 August 1941	18:46	I-16	
16♠	22 June 1941	04:10	I-15		27	23 August 1941	15:26	Pe-2	vicinity of Velikiye Luki
17♠	22 June 1941	07:05	I-153		28	23 August 1941	15:30	Pe-2	vicinity of Velikiye Luki
18♠	22 June 1941	16:43	I-17 (MiG-1)		29	27 August 1941	13:45	DB-3	vicinity of Toropets
19	30 June 1941	18:31	I-15		30	7 September 1941	16:55	V-11 (Il-2)	
20	9 July 1941	16:45	Pe-2		31	8 September 1941	09:35	I-61 (MiG-3)	
21	14 July 1941	16:57	R-5	east-northeast of Smolensk	32	8 September 1941	09:55	DB-3	
22	25 July 1941	06:20	I-16		33	19 September 1941	16:30	I-61 (MiG-3)	east of Sumy
23	26 July 1941	08:01	I-17 (MiG-1)		34	25 September 1941	10:55	Pe-2	
24	29 July 1941	16:05	I-15	vicinity of Dukovshchina					
– Stab III. Gruppe of Jagdgeschwader 53 – Mediterranean Theater — 25 November 1941 – 18 May 1942
35	11 December 1941	11:00	Hurricane	St. Paul's Bay, Malta	38	25 April 1942	12:55	Hurricane	vicinity of Malta
36	2 April 1942	10:20	Spitfire	vicinity of Malta	39	12 May 1942	11:35	Spitfire	vicinity of Malta
37	22 April 1942	18:00	Hurricane	vicinity of Malta					
– Stab of Jagdgeschwader 3 "Udet" – Eastern Front — 19 May 1942 – 3 February 1943
40	13 June 1942	10:20	LaGG-3		99	6 September 1942	17:15	Il-2	10 km (6.2 mi) north of Konnaja
41	22 June 1942	04:00	LaGG-3		100	6 September 1942	17:17	Il-2	15 km (9.3 mi) north of Konnaja
42	24 June 1942	11:20	LaGG-3		101	10 September 1942	11:10	Pe-2	8 km (5.0 mi) west of Tusow
43	24 June 1942	15:15	R-5		102	12 September 1942	11:38	Yak-1	vicinity of Kotluban train station
44	30 June 1942	10:20	Hurricane		103	18 September 1942	09:15	Il-2	vicinity of Kotluban train station
45	3 July 1942	09:36	Boston		104	18 September 1942	09:54	Yak-1	vicinity of Kotluban train station
46	3 July 1942	09:36	Boston		105	18 September 1942	12:10	La-5	west of Kotluban train station
47	3 July 1942	09:37	Boston		106	18 September 1942	12:15	Yak-1	west of Kotluban train station
48	4 July 1942	11:10	LaGG-3		107	19 September 1942	11:40	Yak-7? (Note: According to Mathews and Foreman claimed as a Yakovlev Yak-1.)	5 km (3.1 mi) south of Kotluban train station
49	4 July 1942	12:00	LaGG-3		108	19 September 1942	12:00	Yak-7?	8 km (5.0 mi) south of Kotluban train station
50	4 July 1942	18:00? (Note: According to Mathews and Foreman claimed at 18:50.)	Boston		109	20 September 1942	12:30	LaGG-3	15 km (9.3 mi) northeast of Kotluban train station
51♠	6 July 1942	10:45	P-39		110	20 September 1942	12:34	LaGG-3	15 km (9.3 mi) northeast of Kotluban train station
52♠	6 July 1942	11:00	LaGG-3		111♠	22 September 1942	12:02	Yak-1	north of Stalingrad
53♠	6 July 1942	13:45	R-5		112♠	22 September 1942	12:04	Yak-1	west of Stalingrad
54♠	6 July 1942	17:35	Hurricane	30 km (19 mi) north of Semljansk	113♠	22 September 1942	16:20	Yak-1	north of Akhtuba
55♠	6 July 1942	17:40	Hurricane	30 km (19 mi) north of Semljansk	114♠	22 September 1942	16:25	Yak-1	northeast of Stalingrad
56♠	6 July 1942	18:00	Hurricane	10 km (6.2 mi) south of Sadonsk	115♠	22 September 1942	16:27	Yak-1	2 km (1.2 mi) west of Dubovka
57	9 July 1942	19:20	Il-2		116♠	22 September 1942	16:29	Yak-1	south of Akhtuba
58	9 July 1942	19:23	Il-2		117	24 September 1942	11:01	Yak-1	western Stalingrad
59	10 July 1942	04:30	Boston		118	24 September 1942	11:05	Yak-1	Rastinka airfield near Stalingrad
60	10 July 1942	04:32	Boston		119	24 September 1942	11:12	Yak-1	north of Rastinka airfield
61	10 July 1942	04:33	Boston		120	24 September 1942	16:32	Yak-1	northeast of Stalingrad
62	10 July 1942	13:30	Boston		121	25 September 1942	11:36	Yak-1	5 km (3.1 mi) north of Stalingrad
63	11 July 1942	11:40	MiG-1		122	27 September 1942	16:00	Il-2	east of Stalingrad
64	11 July 1942	11:42	MiG-1		123	28 September 1942	11:05	Yak-1	6 km (3.7 mi) north of Dubovka
65	11 July 1942	13:30	R-5		124	28 September 1942	11:08	Yak-1	6 km (3.7 mi) north of Dubovka
66	12 July 1942	13:00	R-5		125	28 September 1942	11:20	Yak-1	northeast of Stalingrad
67	12 July 1942	16:05	LaGG-3		126	29 September 1942	10:21	Il-2	north of Kalach train station
68	12 July 1942	16:07	LaGG-3		127	29 September 1942	15:33	Il-2	vicinity of Stalingrad
69	18 July 1942	15:50	LaGG-3	south of Boschkowka	128	29 September 1942	15:37	Yak-1	15 km (9.3 mi) north of Akhtuba
70	24 July 1942	10:25? (Note: According to Mathews and Foreman claimed as an Ilyushin Il-2 at 10:29.)	I-153?		129	3 October 1942	12:00	Yak-4	20 km (12 mi) northeast of Kalach
71	26 July 1942	12:45	Hurricane	south of Kalach	130	24 October 1942	11:20	Yak-1	25 km (16 mi) north-northwest of Stalingrad
72	26 July 1942	12:50	Hurricane	south of Kalach	131	24 October 1942	15:20	Yak-1	10 km (6.2 mi) north-northwest of Kalach
73	26 July 1942	16:05	Pe-2? (Note: According to Mathews and Foreman claimed as an Ilyushin Il-2.)		132	24 October 1942	15:23	Yak-1	25 km (16 mi) northwest of Kalach
74	26 July 1942	16:06	Pe-2?		133	25 October 1942	14:34	Yak-1	Gumrak Airfield
75	27 July 1942	10:30	LaGG-3	Kalach	134	26 October 1942	14:15	Yak-1	12 km (7.5 mi) northwest of Beketowka
76	28 July 1942	16:30	LaGG-3	northwest of Kalach	135	1 November 1942	14:10	Yak-1	northern Stalingrad
77	4 August 1942	15:00	Su-2 (Seversky)	Abganerowo	136	1 November 1942	14:12	Yak-1	northern Stalingrad
78	5 August 1942	17:10	LaGG-3	south of Stalingrad	137	24 November 1942	12:50	Il-2	6 km (3.7 mi) south of Pitomnik Airfield
79	6 August 1942	10:10	LaGG-3	Stalingrad	138	24 November 1942	12:53	Yak-1	6 km (3.7 mi) south of Pitomnik Airfield
80	9 August 1942	11:05	MiG-1	east-northeast of Kalach	139	30 November 1942	09:00	Il-2	2 km (1.2 mi) southeast of Pitomnik Airfield
81	12 August 1942	17:15	LaGG-3	Akhtuba	140	30 November 1942	12:10	La-5	5 km (3.1 mi) southeast of Pitomnik Airfield
82	13 August 1942	12:10	Boston	Akhtuba	141	2 December 1942	13:40	Yak-1	east of Karpovka
83	13 August 1942	17:45	LaGG-3?	PQ 4932 south of Borodajewka	142	8 December 1942	12:57	Il-2	PQ 19661; 20 km (12 mi) east-southeast of Morozovsk (Morosowskaja)
84	17 August 1942	12:20	DB-3? (Note: According to Mathews and Foreman claimed as a Tupolev TB-3 (ANT-6).)	Akhtuba	143	8 December 1942	12:59	Il-2	PQ 19634; 20 km (12 mi) east of Morosowskaja
85	20 August 1942	04:42	Er-2	PQ 4915–4911	144	8 December 1942	13:02	Il-2	PQ 19632; 20 km (12 mi) east of Morosowskaja
86	20 August 1942	04:46	Er-2	PQ 4915–4911	145	12 December 1942	12:35	La-5	PQ 3963, south of Stalingrad
87	20 August 1942	04:49	Er-2	PQ 4915–4911	146	12 December 1942	12:40	Yak-1	PQ 3941, south of Stalingrad
88	23 August 1942	07:46	Hurricane	northwest of Stalingrad	147	12 December 1942	12:45	Yak-1	PQ 4941, Pitomnik Airfield
89	23 August 1942	14:50	R-5	north of Stalingrad	148	12 December 1942	12:55	Yak-1	PQ 4917, southeast of Stalingrad
90	26 August 1942	08:35	Yak-7	northwest of Stalingrad	149	17 December 1942	07:50	Yak-1	PQ 29452, Ssuruwikino
91	28 August 1942	09:35	Yak-4	east of Rachowka	150	17 December 1942	07:55	Yak-1	PQ 29452, Ssuruwikino
92	30 August 1942	09:05	Il-2	north-northwest of Stalingrad	151	17 December 1942	11:15	Yak-1	2 km (1.2 mi) south of Sety
93	31 August 1942	09:00	LaGG-3	south of Sarepta	152	18 December 1942	09:35	Il-2	6 km (3.7 mi) west of Schulow train station
94	31 August 1942	09:10	LaGG-3	east of Zaza	153	18 December 1942	09:38	Il-2	6 km (3.7 mi) west of Schulow train station
95	31 August 1942	13:10	P-40	southwest of Sarepta	154	18 December 1942	09:45	Yak-1	25 km (16 mi) west of Schulow train station
96	31 August 1942	17:10	LaGG-3	west of Stalingrad	155	28 December 1942	08:55	Yak-1	Tschernyschkow
97	3 September 1942	13:40	Yak-1	10 km (6.2 mi) west of Dubovka	156	5 January 1943	10:05	Il-2	10 km (6.2 mi) southeast of Stalingrad
98	3 September 1942	17:16	Yak-1	north of Stalingrad					
– Stab of Jagdgeschwader 3 "Udet" – Defense of the Reich — September 1943 – 23 March 1944
157?	10 February 1944	11:50~	P-38	Hanover/Braunschweig	160?	4 March 1944	13:10	B-17	Wittenberg/Neuruppin/Stendal
158?	24 February 1944	14:30	B-24*	Bad Nauheim/Koblenz	161?	23 March 1944	—	B-17	
159?	4 March 1944	13:10	B-17	Wittenberg/Neuruppin/Stendal	162?	23 March 1944	—	P-51	southeast of Braunschweig vicinity of Schöppenstedt

=== Awards ===
- Spanish Cross in Bronze with Swords
- Wound Badge in Black
- Front Flying Clasp of the Luftwaffe in Gold with Pennant "700"
- Combined Pilots-Observation Badge
- Iron Cross (1939)
  - 2nd Class (25 November 1939)
  - 1st Class (11 July 1940)
- Honor Goblet of the Luftwaffe (1 April 1941)
- German Cross in Gold on 3 November 1942 as Major in Jagdgeschwader 3
- Knight's Cross of the Iron Cross with Oak Leaves and Swords
  - Knight's Cross on 6 August 1941 as Hauptmann and Gruppenkommandeur of the III./Jagdgeschwader 53
  - 122nd Oak Leaves on 9 September 1942 as Hauptmann and Geschwaderkommodore of Jagdgeschwader 3 "Udet" (Note: Von Seemen presents two dates for the presentation of the Oak Leaves, the first date is 9 September 1942, the second is 10 September 1942.)
  - 23rd Swords on 23 December 1942 as Major and Geschwaderkommodore of Jagdgeschwader 3 "Udet"

== Notes ==
Military offices
Preceded by Oberst Günther Lützow	Commander of Jagdgeschwader 3 Udet; 11 August 1942 – 23 March 1944	Succeeded by Major Friedrich-Karl Müller
