= Tatsinsky =

Tatsinsky (masculine), Tatsinskaya (feminine), or Tatsinskoye (neuter) may refer to:

- Tatsinsky District, a district of Rostov Oblast, Russia
- Tatsinskaya Airfield, the airfield used by the German Wehrmacht during the Battle of Stalingrad
- Tatsinskaya (rural locality), a rural locality (a stanitsa) in Rostov Oblast, Russia
