= Karpovka airfield =

Wehrmacht airfield near Stalingrad, Russia

Karpovka Airfield
- Karpovka, Russia
- Map showing Karpovka in the 6th Army encirclement

Site information
- Type: Military Airfield
- Controlled by: Luftwaffe; Royal Romanian Air Force

Location
- Coordinates: 48°41′58″N 43°53′47″E

Site history
- Battles/wars: World War II: Stalingrad

The Karpovka airfield, also known as Karpovka-West, was the main forward dive bomber air base used by the German Wehrmacht during the Battle of Stalingrad. It was the headquarters location of Sturzkampfgeschwader 2 and the Romanian Grupul 7 Vânătoare until November 1942.

== Overview ==
The Luftwaffe began using Karpovka airfield in August 1942. The airfield had a surface area of 1960 x 1500 meters. From 22/23 September, the airfield served as the main base for the Luftwaffe Ju 87 dive bombers, which were attacking Stalingrad. Stab., III./StG 2, and II./StG 1 were deployed at the airfield in early October. Around the same time, the Royal Romanian Air Force Grupul 7 Vânătoare equipped with Bf 109 fighters was also deployed at Karpovka. In November, I. and II./StG 2 joined the rest of Sturzkampfgeschwader 2 at the airfield as well.

On 4 October, the Luftwaffe ordered the expansion of Karpovka, intending to use it as one of the 7 major bases around Stalingrad. Few suitable living quarters were available at the airfield, with billeting allowed in civilian houses, while most base personnel lived in earthen dugouts. The plan to expand the airfield was abandoned before any works could be completed.

=== Evacuation of Karpovka ===
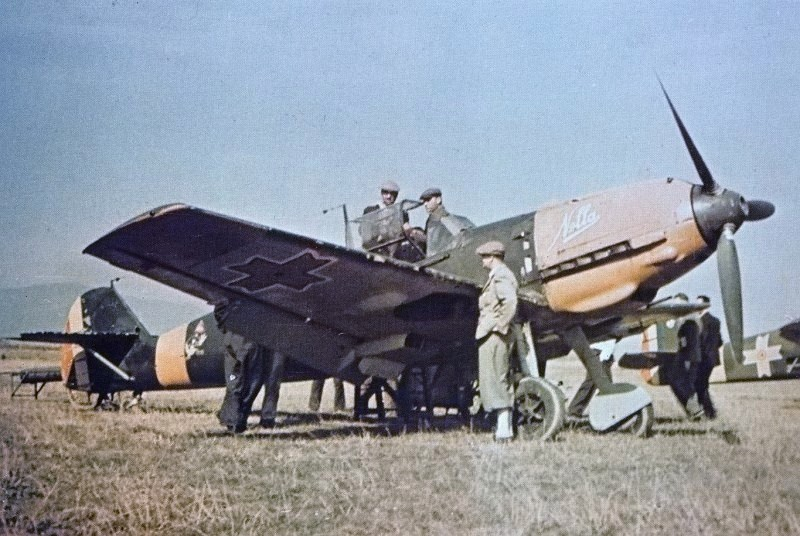
One of the Bf 109s that escaped from Karpovka, seen in 1943

After the start of Operation Uranus on 19 November, Karpovka became one of the airfields trapped in the Stalingrad pocket with the 6th Army. On 21 November, reconnaissance flights carried out by Grupul 7 spotted Soviet tanks a few kilometers south of the airfield. Subsequently, the defense of the base was prepared. A defensive perimeter was established by StG 2 utilizing ground personnel as infantry, while Romanian units were organized by Lieutenant Alexandru Șerbănescu. Șerbănescu made use of two anti-aircraft artillery batteries of 37 mm and 75 mm cannons, and placed some of the group's Bf 109s on oil barrels in a direct fire position.

The Soviet Mechanized Corps elements reached Karpovka on 22 November. The initial assaults were held off over the night. The heavy fire from the defenders likely made the attackers believe they were up against an entrenched position. Before dawn on 23 November, all serviceable aircraft were evacuated from Karpovka under bombardment from Soviet T-34s. StG 2 lost around 23 aircraft and suffered 20 casualties. Grupul 7 lost five aircraft in the evacuation, and a further seven unserviceable fighters were abandoned. Eight pilots reached Tatsinskaya Airfield, some also carrying one or two mechanics (in the case of Tiberiu Vinca) on board, having removed the radio equipment and armor plating from their Bf 109s for space.

For several days, more personnel was evacuated from Karpovka by Ju 52s. Others retreated to Pitomnik Airfield, and some managed to escape the encirclement.

== Location ==
The airfield was located 6 km (3.7 mi) West of Karpovka and 1.2 km (0.75 mi) North-West of the village of Prudboy.

== Battle of Stalingrad airfields ==
=== Pocket airfields ===
Seven airfields were used inside the pocket to supply the 6th Army:

- Pitomnik
- Bolshaia Rossoshka
- Stalingradski
- Gumrak, now Volgograd International Airport
- Basargino (Volgograd-Biryuzovyy)
- Voroponovo
- Karpovka

=== External airfields ===
Eleven airfields were used to supply the 6th Army from outside of the pocket:

- Tatsinskaya
- Morozovsk
- Sverovo
- Salsk
- Stalino-Nord
- Novocherkassk
- Lugansk
- Gorlivka
- Makiivka
- Kostiantynivka
- Rostov
