= 2004 Russian aircraft bombings =

2004 bombings of two Russian passenger flights

Bombing
- Date: 24 August 2004
- Summary: Suicide bombings
- Site: Tula and Rostov Oblasts, Russia
- Total fatalities: 90
- Total survivors: 0

First aircraft
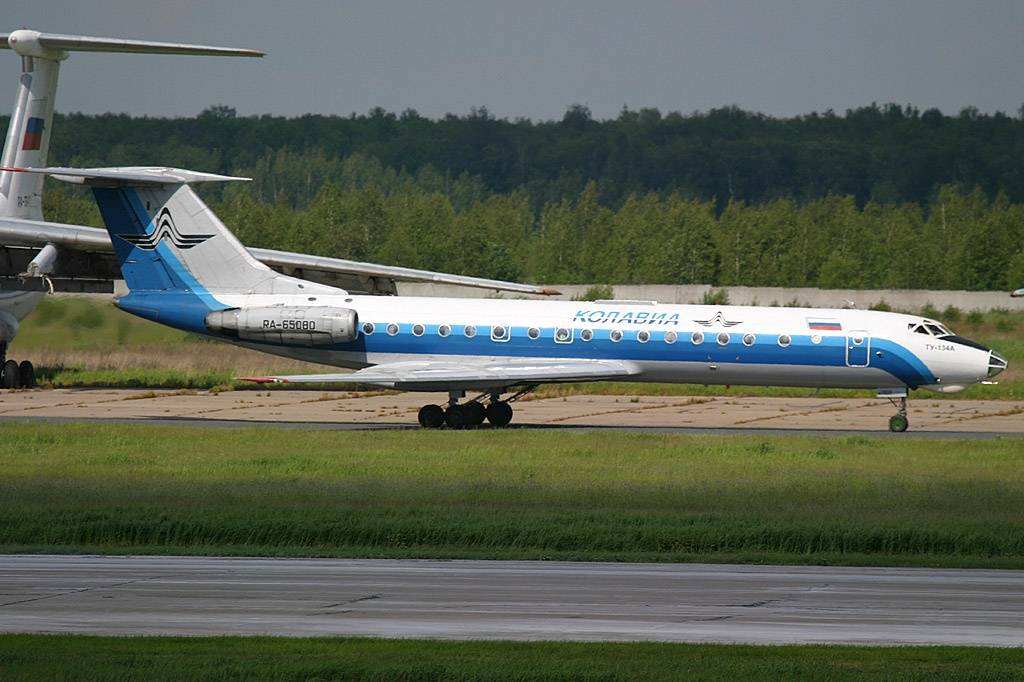
- The Tu-134 involved, seen here two months before the bombings, operated by Metrojet at Domodedovo International Airport
- Type: Tupolev Tu-134A-3
- Operator: Volga-AviaExpress
- IATA flight No.: G61303
- ICAO flight No.: WLG1303
- Call sign: GOUMRAK 1303
- Registration: RA-65080
- Flight origin: Domodedovo International Airport, Moscow
- Destination: Volgograd International Airport, Volgograd
- Passengers: 35
- Crew: 9
- Fatalities: 44
- Survivors: 0

Second aircraft
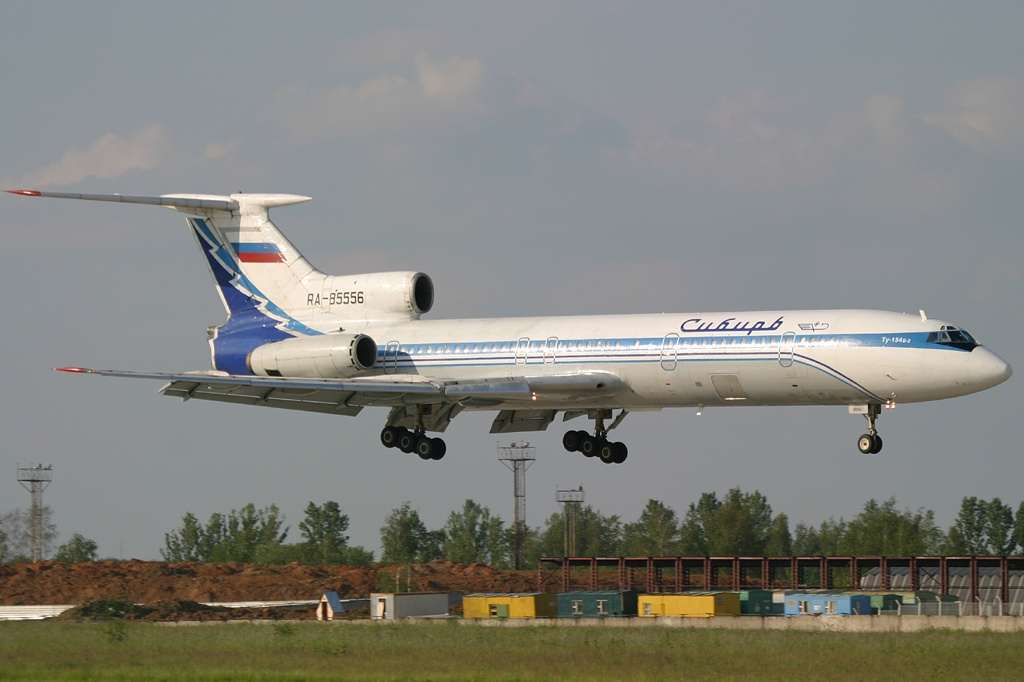
- Tu-154B-2 RA-85556, the aircraft involved, landing at Domodedovo International Airport in June 2004
- Type: Tupolev Tu-154B-2
- Operator: S7 Airlines
- IATA flight No.: S71047
- ICAO flight No.: SBI1047
- Call sign: SIBERIAN 1047
- Registration: RA-85556
- Flight origin: Domodedovo International Airport, Moscow
- Destination: Adler-Sochi International Airport, Sochi
- Passengers: 38
- Crew: 8
- Fatalities: 46
- Survivors: 0

On the night of 24 August 2004, explosive devices were detonated on board two domestic passenger flights that had taken off from Domodedovo International Airport in Moscow, Russia, causing the destruction of both aircraft and the death of all 90 people on board.

Subsequent investigations concluded that two Chechen female suicide bombers were responsible for the bombings, which were also later claimed by the leader of the Chechen insurgency.

== Flights ==
Note: All times quoted below are local times, UTC +4. All events occurred in the same country.

=== Volga-AviaExpress Flight 1303 ===
The first to crash was Volga-AviaExpress Flight 1303, a Tupolev Tu-134, registered RA-65080, which had been in service since 1977. The plane was flying from Moscow to Volgograd. It left Domodedovo International Airport at 22:30 on 24 August 2004. Communication with the plane was lost at 22:56 while it was flying over Tula Oblast, 180 kilometres (110 mi) south of Moscow. The remains of the aircraft were found on the ground several hours later. Thirty-four passengers and 9 crew members were on board the plane. All of them died in the crash.

The flight recorders were recovered from the crash site. The flight data recorder showed that the plane was cruising uneventfully at 8,100 metres (26,600 ft), before indicating some type of high energy event likely originating near the right hand side of the aircraft at seat row 19. Both recorders stopped recording within 2–3 seconds of this event. This was followed by the separation of the fuselage at that location an undetermined amount of time afterward.

=== Siberia Airlines Flight 1047 ===
Just minutes after the first crash, Siberia Airlines Flight 1047, which had left Domodedovo International Airport at 21:35 on 24 August 2004, disappeared from the radar screens and crashed. The Tu-154 aircraft, registered RA-85556, which had been in service since 1982, was flying from Moscow to Sochi. According to an unnamed government source of the Russian news agency Interfax, the plane had broadcast a hijack warning while flying over Rostov Oblast at 22:59. However, it was later determined that this was the aircraft's Emergency Locator Transmitter (ELT), and that the crew of Flight 1047 were not aware of any danger prior to the aircraft disappearing from radar. The plane disappeared from radar screens shortly after that and crashed. 38 passengers and 8 crew members were on board the plane, and there were no survivors. The debris of the aircraft was found on the morning of 25 August 2004, 9 kilometres (5.6 mi) from the work settlement of Gluboky in Kamensky District of Rostov Oblast.

The flight recorders were also recovered in this case; the flight data recorder along with wreckage analysis suggested an almost identical high-energy event to the one seen on Flight 1303 took place near the right hand side of the aircraft at seat row 25, while the aircraft was cruising at 12,100 metres (39,700 ft). The blast resulted in a rapid decompression of the cabin, damage to the elevator and rudder controls, a substantial loss of electrical power, and severe damage to the fuselage and tail components. The ELT was triggered half a second after the event, either by a crew member or automatically. The data recorder stopped working shortly after the explosion, but the cockpit voice recorder continued recording until impact with the ground, during which most of the crew discussions were about the loss of cabin pressure and electrical systems. The crew were caught completely off guard by the event, and there is no evidence that the crew was aware of the detonation of an explosive device on board.

== Responsibility ==
The two almost simultaneous crashes caused speculations about terrorism. President Vladimir Putin immediately ordered the Federal Security Service (FSB) to investigate the crashes. On 28 August 2004, the FSB had found traces of the explosive RDX in the remains of both planes. Itar-Tass news agency reported on 30 August 2004, "without a shadow of a doubt, the FSB security service said that 'both airplanes were blown up as a result of a terrorist attack'". A little known group called the Islambouli Brigades claimed responsibility; the truth of those claims remains uncertain. The Islambouli Brigades have also claimed that five of their members were on each plane; experts are skeptical about the possibility of (and the need for) so many terrorists on board.

The subsequent investigation found that the bombs were triggered by two female Chechen suicide bombers, Grozny residents Satsita Dzhebirkhanova (Siberia Airlines Flight 1047) and Amanta Nagayeva (Volga-AviaExpress Flight 1303). Nagayeva's brother had disappeared three years earlier and the family believed he was abducted by Russian forces. Chechen field commander Shamil Basayev took responsibility for the bombings in an open letter published on the Chechen separatists' websites on 17 September 2004. He claimed that the aircraft bombings cost him US$4,000 in total. He has also denied the Islambouli Brigade's claims.

The bombings followed a suicide bombing in February 2004, which killed 41 people at the Avtozavodskaya subway station in Moscow, and preceded other deadly attacks in Russia soon afterwards: on 31 August 2004 another suicide bombing killed 10 at Moscow's Rizhskaya subway station, and then the Beslan hostage crisis began on 1 September 2004 which would leave over 335 people dead, many of them children.

== Arrests and trials ==
On 24 August 2004, the bombers were stopped in the airport by police captain Mikhail Artamonov to be searched for weapons and for identification. They were accompanied by two male Chechens. The four of them arrived in Moscow on a flight from Makhachkala. According to the prosecution, Artamonov did not search them, and subsequently was charged with criminal negligence. On 30 June 2005, he was convicted of negligence and sentenced to seven years of imprisonment. An appeal was made against the sentence, and the court subsequently reduced the term to six years.

According to investigators, ticket seller Armen Aratyunyan was bribed approximately €140 to sell tickets to the two women without obtaining their correct IDs. Aratyunyan also helped Dzhebirkhanova to bribe the ticket-checking clerk, Nikolai Korenkov, with €25 to get on board without the proper IDs. On 15 April 2005, Aratyunyan and Korenkov were convicted of giving and taking bribes. They were sentenced to 1.5 years in a settlement colony (settlement colony convicts have more rights and privileges than people in standard colonies).

Twenty-one relatives of the deceased passengers filed a civil suit against the security company responsible for checking the passengers, ZAO East-Line Aviation Security. They demanded 3,000,000 rubles (approximately €86,600 or US$115,000) in damages per victim. The trial in that case started in Volgograd on 22 February 2007. The security company claimed that it was not liable for damages, but the persons who organized the bombings were. The court handling the civil case sent a request to the prosecutor's office to get an update on the criminal investigation. The investigation was suspended indefinitely on 26 September 2006. According to the investigator who was handling the case, the people helping the suicide bombers at the airport were killed in Chechnya, the people responsible for planning the bombings were not identified (Shamil Basayev, who claimed responsibility for organizing the bombings, was also killed), and consequently the investigation was suspended due to lack of suspects. That civil case was still in court as of December 2009. Other passengers' relatives also sued the Russian Ministry of Internal Affairs, S7 Airlines and two insurance companies, Ingosstrakh and OAO Afes for damages (none of the defendants acknowledge any liability). On 21 October 2007, the court in the latter case found S7 Airlines liable for damages and ruled they should pay the relative of the victim in question 250,000 rubles (approximately €7,000), which was about 10% of what the plaintiffs asked for. S7's initial appeal was rejected by the court on 27 May 2008. A new S7 appeal was successful in April 2009 and the verdict was rejected. Relatives of the passenger appealed against the decision, but their appeal was dismissed in August 2009. They plan to appeal to a higher court.

== See also ==
- 2011 Domodedovo International Airport bombing
