= Tatsinskaya Airfield =

Wehrmacht airfield near Stalingrad, Russia

- Tatsinskaya, Russia

Site information
- Type: Military Airfield
- Controlled by: Luftwaffe; Royal Romanian Air Force

Location
- Coordinates: 48°10′02″N 41°16′40″E

Site history
- Battles/wars: World War II: Stalingrad

The Tatsinskaya Airfield was the main airfield used by the German Wehrmacht during the Battle of Stalingrad to supply the encircled 6th Army from outside.

== Overview ==
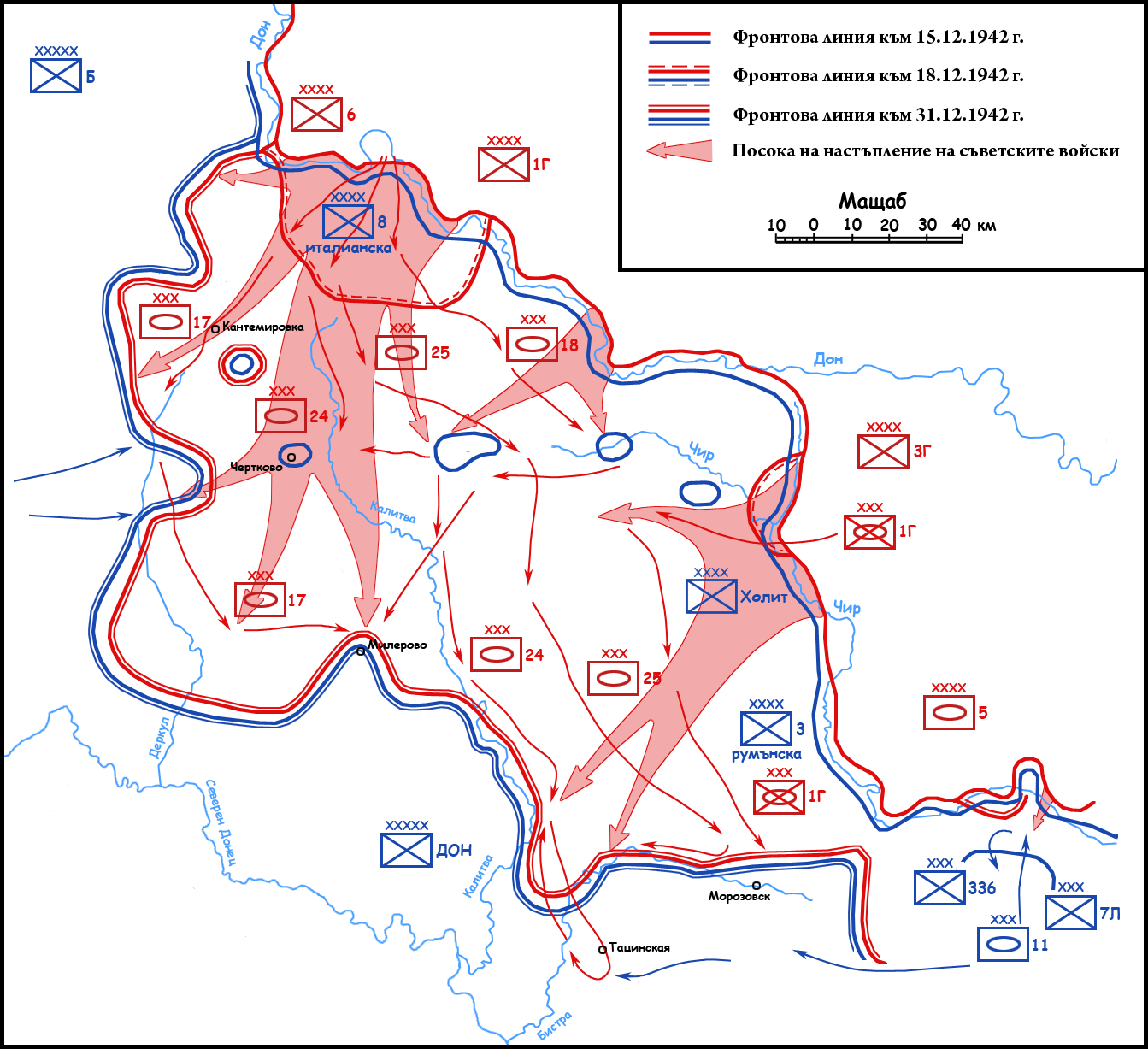
Operation Little Saturn with the Tatsinskaya Raid near the bottom

The Tatsinskaya Airfield, 260 km west of Stalingrad, became the most important airfield for the supply of the trapped 6th Army in Stalingrad after all land connections were severed after 24 November 1942, when the airlift began.

From Tatsinskaya, a Junkers Ju 52 plane would take approx. 1¼ hour to reach Stalingrad, from where it would return after a 3½ hour turnaround, theoretically making it possible to complete a mission in six hours. Tatsinskaya served as the main base for the Ju 52 transport planes, while Morozovskaya was mainly used by the Heinkel He 111 bombers, which were converted to transport planes.

The airfield was under threat of being taken by the Soviet Red Army but Hermann Göring forbade its evacuation, despite request from Major General Fiebig, who was in charge of the air supply for Stalingrad. On 23 December Göring gave permission to evacuate, but it was too late; Tatsinskaya was overrun a day later, with the German Luftwaffe losing almost 70 of the 180 Ju 52s stationed there and all ground equipment. The fall of the airfield, along with the one at Morozovskaya being threatened, brought supplies to the 6th Army to a halt until the 26th. Although briefly retaken by the Germans on the 28th, Tatsinskaya fell back into Soviet hands by 31 December.

After the fall of Tatsinskaya, the Ju 52s from there were relocated to Salsk, while the He 111s went to Novocherkassk, increasing the distance to travel considerably.

The airfield was guarded by Romanian Air Force's 4th Anti-Aircraft Brigade under the command of the Air Combat Group (GAL), specifically by Vickers/Reșița 75 mm anti-aircraft guns. Similarly to German 88 mm flak, these guns also proved effective against Soviet armor. Romanian gunners destroyed five Soviet tanks while defending the airfield.

== Location ==
The still existing airfield is located approximately 35 kilometers (22 mi) east of the town of Belaya Kalitva, near the stanitsa of Tatsinskaya.

== Battle of Stalingrad airfields ==
=== Pocket airfields ===
Seven airfields were used inside the pocket to supply the 6th Army:

- Pitomnik
- Bolshaia Rossoshka
- Stalingradski
- Gumrak, now Volgograd International Airport
- Basargino
- Voroponovo
- Karpovka

=== External airfields ===
Eleven airfields were used to supply the 6th Army from outside of the pocket:

- Tatsinskaya
- Morozovsk
- Sverovo
- Salsk
- Stalino-Nord
- Novocherkassk
- Lugansk
- Gorlivka
- Makiivka
- Kostiantynivka
- Rostov
