= Air Volga =

Russian airline

IATA	ICAO	Call sign
G6	VLA; WLG	GOUMRAK
- Founded: 1992; 34 years ago (following the dissolution of Aeroflot)
- Ceased operations: 2010; 16 years ago (acquired by RusLine)
- Operating bases: Volgograd International Airport
- Headquarters: Volgograd, Russia
- Website: www.vae.ru (defunct)

LCC Air Volga (Russian: ООО «Авиакомпания Во́лга») was an airline headquartered in Volgograd, Russia, operating scheduled passenger flights and holiday charters from its base at Volgograd International Airport.

== History ==
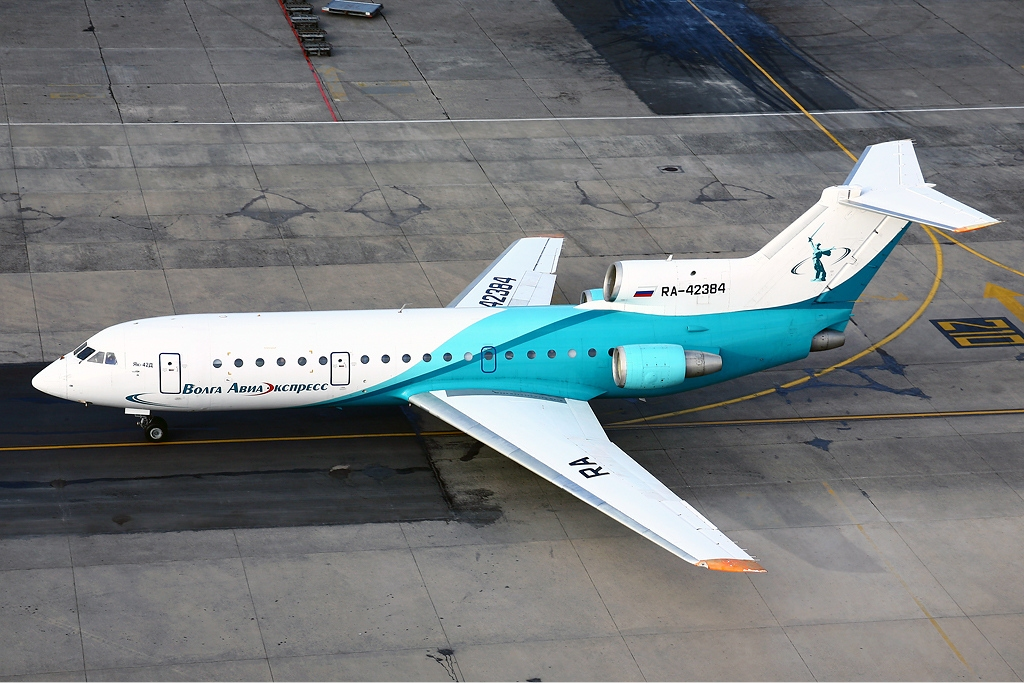
A Volga Aviaexpress Yakovlev Yak-42 at Istanbul Atatürk Airport (2008).

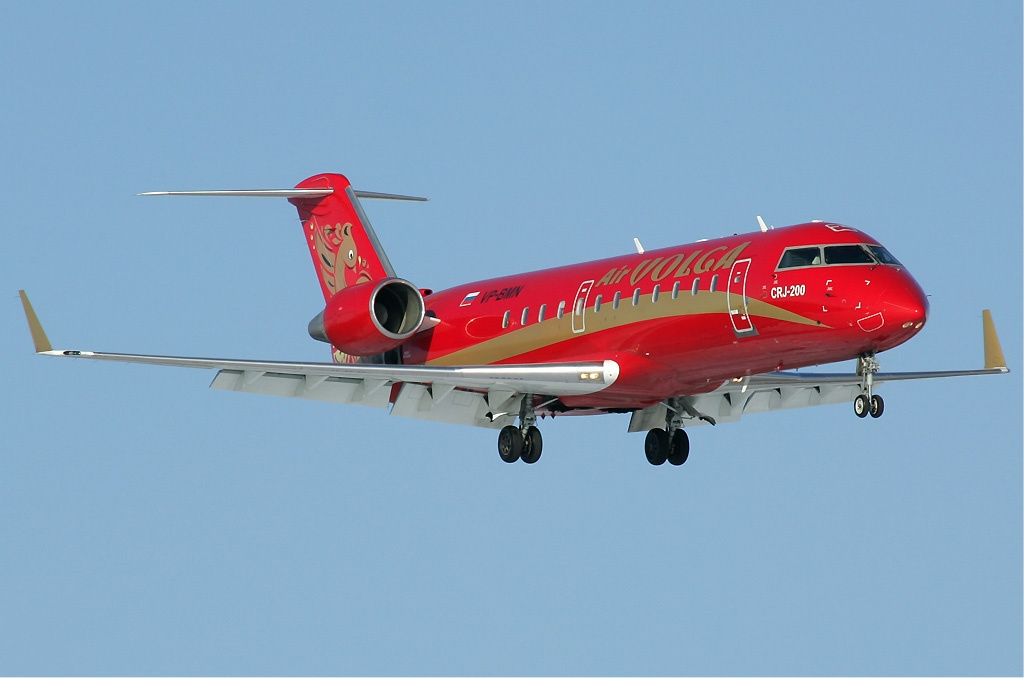
An Air Volga Bombardier CRJ200 approaching Domodedovo International Airport (2010).

When Aeroflot was dissolved in 1992, its Volgograd-based division became an independent company known as Volga Airlines, having inherited a number of Soviet aircraft. The airline was renamed Volga Aviaexpress (Russian: ООО «Волга Авиа-экспресс») in 1998, and again Air Volga on 14 November 2008. In February 2009, the Bombardier CRJ200 became the first Western-built aircraft to be operated by Air Volga. After the initial two 50-seat Bombardier aircraft joined the fleet, another four arrived in November of that year.

On 1 April 2010, Air Volga declared bankruptcy, and all flight operations were stopped. Its assets and brand name was acquired by RusLine, along with the route network and CRJ200 fleet. The Air Volga name thus survived, currently being used for the marketing of regional RusLine flights.

== Route network ==
Between 2006 and 2010, Volga Aviaexpress/Air Volga operated scheduled flights to the following destinations:

Country	City	Airport
Armenia	Yerevan	Zvartnots International Airport
Azerbaijan	Baku	Heydar Aliyev International Airport
Kazakhstan	Aktau	Aktau Airport
Russia	Moscow	Domodedovo International Airport
Russia	Nalchik	Nalchik Airport
Russia	Saint Petersburg	Pulkovo Airport
Russia	Sochi	Sochi International Airport (seasonal)
Russia	Surgut	Surgut International Airport
Russia	Volgograd	Volgograd International Airport (base)
Russia	Yekaterinburg	Koltsovo Airport
Turkey	Antalya	Antalya Airport (seasonal)
Turkey	Bodrum	Milas–Bodrum Airport (seasonal)
Turkey	Dalaman	Dalaman Airport (seasonal)

== Fleet ==
Over the years, the following aircraft types were operated:

Air Volga fleet
Aircraft	Introduced	Retired
Antonov An-2		
Bombardier CRJ200	2009	2010
Tupolev Tu-134		
Yakovlev Yak-40		
Yakovlev Yak-42		

== Accidents and incidents ==
- On 25 January 1995, a Volga Airlines Yakovlev Yak-40 (registered RA-87464) was damaged beyond repair when it overran the runway on landing at Rostov-on-Don Airport, subsequently colliding with a concrete wall. The ten passengers and four crew members on the flight from Volgograd survived the accident, which was later attributed to pilot error.
- On 2 June 1995, the twelve people on board a Volga Airlines Antonov An-2 (registered CCCP-68142) died when the aircraft crashed in poor weather conditions near Volgograd.
- The Bombing of Flight 1303 on 24 August 2004 with its 44 fatalities was the worst incident in the history of the airline. A bomb detonated on board the Tupolev Tu-134 (registered RA-65080) en route a flight from Moscow to Volgograd, resulting in the aircraft crashing in Tula Oblast. Nearly simultaneously, another bomb was exploded on a Siberian Airlines flight. Female suicide terrorists from Chechnya were made responsible for these attacks.
