= Pitomnik Airfield =

Airfield in Volgograd, Russia

- Volgograd, Russia

Site information
- Type: Military Airfield
- Controlled by: Luftwaffe

Location
- Coordinates: 48°44′33″N 44°15′00″E

Site history
- Battles/wars: Battle of Stalingrad

The Pitomnik airfield (Russian: питомник, lit. plant nursery) was an airfield in Russia. During the Second World War, it was the primary of seven airfields used by the German Wehrmacht during the Battle of Stalingrad.

Flights originating from Pitomnik generally had two main initial destinations outside the pocket, Tatsinskaya and Morozovskaya.

== Overview ==
Pitomnik was captured by the German 6th Army when it linked up there with the 4th Panzer Army on 3 September 1942.

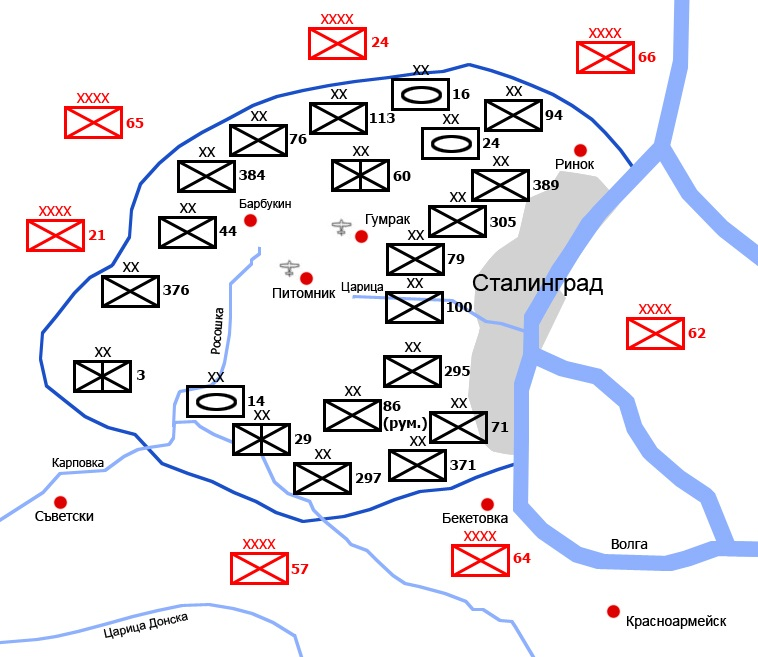
Map of the Stalingrad pocket, showing Pitomnik in its centre

The airfield at Pitomnik was one of seven airfields within the Stalingrad Pocket after the 6th Army was encircled and the only one properly equipped to handle large amounts of air traffic. The field was equipped with lights for night operation.

Ordered to the "cauldron" by Friedrich Paulus, Wilhelm Adam flew from Morozovsk airstrip to Pitomnik on 12 Dec. 1942. After his He 111 landed, Adam noted, "The place was overflowing with crashed aircraft and destroyed vehicles: there a 'Condor', here a 'Focke Wulf'. Among the wrecks were several Ju 52s and He 111s – the work of the Red bombers and fighters!"

Along with anti aircraft guns, the airfield was protected by fighter planes of Jagdgeschwader 3, elements of which were based there and referred to as the Platzschutzstaffel (airfield defence squadron), the remainder of JG 3 was stationed outside the pocket. In mid-January, the remaining planes of the group were ordered to leave the pocket.

The airfield was used to fly out the remaining female hospital staff of the 6th Army, when the hopelessness of the situation became apparent. Male medical staff were not permitted to leave. The edges of the runway were filled with wounded German soldiers whose conditions were deemed not serious enough for evacuation, and only ambulatory cases were actually evacuated by air.

From 15 January, Pitomnik came under artillery fire of the Red Army and two days later, the airfield was captured, leaving the 6th Army with Gumrak as its only supply airfield. Karpovka had already fallen on 13 January and alongside Pitomnik, four other airfields fell on 17 January. Soviet sources vary on exactly which Red Army units took the airfield. General Ivan Chistyakov, commander of the 21st Army, stated in his memoirs that it was his "51st Guards Rifle Division, together with units of 252nd Rifle Division..." However, the Red Army General Staff's operational study credited the 298th and 293rd Rifle Divisions of the same Army. As well, Gen. P. I. Batov of the 65th Army stated in his memoirs that units of his Army took the airfield in hand-to-hand combat. According to David M. Glantz, the airfield was in fact captured by the 51st Guards and the 252nd Rifle Divisions, while the village of Pitomnik was seized by the 298th and 293rd. Gumrak eventually fell on 23 January, leaving the 6th Army without any means of direct support.

As of 2009, the location of the Pitomnik Airfield is used as farmland.

== Battle of Stalingrad airfields ==
=== Pocket airfields ===
Seven airfields were used inside the pocket to supply the 6th Army:

- Pitomnik
- Bolshaia Rossoshka
- Stalingradski
- Gumrak, now Volgograd International Airport
- Basargino
- Voroponovo
- Karpovka

=== External airfields ===
Eleven airfields were used to supply the 6th Army from outside of the pocket:

- Morozovskaya
- Tatsinskaya
- Sverovo
- Salsk
- Stalino-Nord
- Novocherkassk
- Luhansk
- Horlivka
- Makiivka
- Kostiantynivka
- Rostov
