= Tatsinsky District =

Tatsinsky District Тацинский район (Russian)
- District
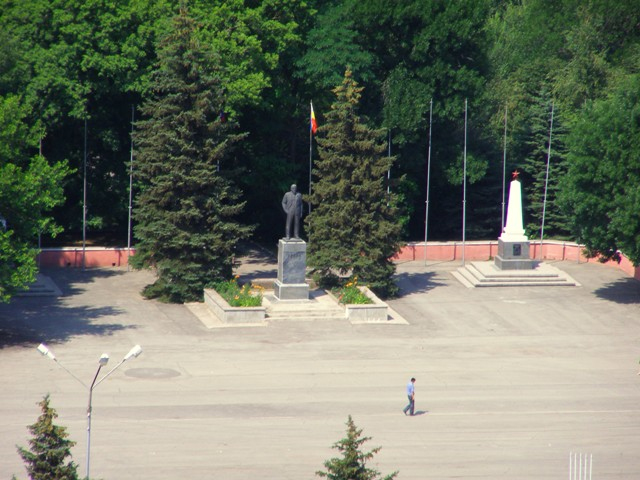
- Public memorials in Tatsinsky District

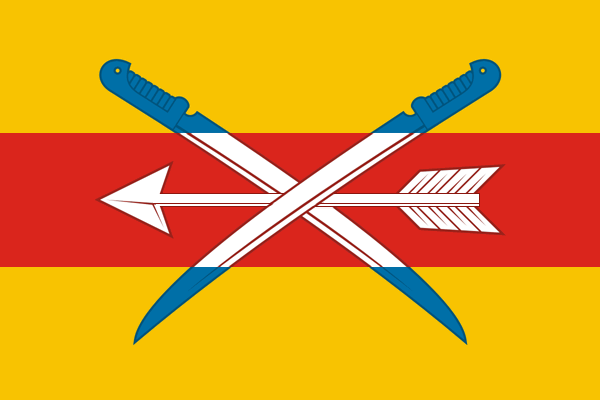
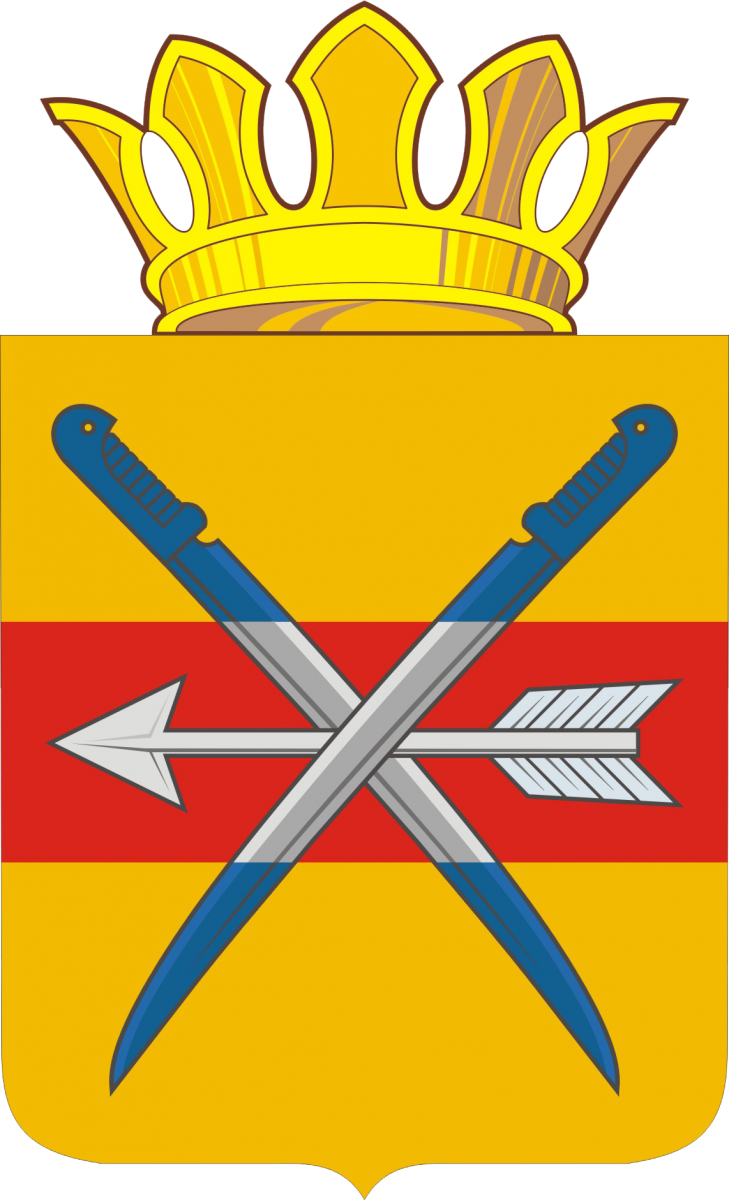
- Flag Coat of arms
- Location of Tatsinsky District in Rostov Oblast
- Coordinates: 48°11′49″N 41°16′23″E
- Country: Russia
- Federal subject: Rostov Oblast
- Established: 1924
- Administrative center: Tatsinskaya

Area
  - Total: 2,411 km^{2} (931 sq mi)

Population (2010 Census)
  - Total: 38,464
  - Density: 15.95/km^{2} (41.32/sq mi)
  - Urban: 14.6%
  - Rural: 85.4%

Administrative structure
  - Administrative divisions: 1 Urban settlements, 10 Rural settlements
  - Inhabited localities: 1 urban-type settlements, 61 rural localities

Municipal structure
  - Municipally incorporated as: Tatsinsky Municipal District
  - Municipal divisions: 1 urban settlements, 10 rural settlements
- Time zone: UTC+3 (MSK)
- OKTMO ID: 60654000

Tatsinsky District (Russian: Таци́нский райо́н) is an administrative and municipal district (raion), one of the forty-three in Rostov Oblast, Russia. It is located in the center of the oblast. The area of the district is 2,411 square kilometers (931 sq mi). Its administrative center is the rural locality (a stanitsa) of Tatsinskaya. Population: 38,464 (2010 Census); 43,251 (2002 census); 43,306 (1989 Soviet census). The population of Tatsinskaya accounts for 26.0% of the district's total population.
