= Prudboy =

Prudboy Прудбой
- Settlement
- Location within Volgograd Oblast Location within Russia
- Coordinates: 48°41′N 43°55′E
- Country: Russia
- Region: Volgograd Oblast
- District: Kalachyovsky District
- Time zone: UTC+4:00

Prudboy (Russian: Прудбой) is a rural locality (a settlement) in Marinovskoye Rural Settlement, Kalachyovsky District, Volgograd Oblast, Russia. Prudboy had a population of 798 in 2010. There are 26 streets.

== Geography ==
Prudboy is located 31 km east of Kalach-na-Donu (the district's administrative centre) by road. Karpovka is the nearest rural locality.
