= Tatsinskaya (rural locality) =

Rural locality in Rostov Oblast, Russia

Coordinates: 48°11′40″N 41°16′50″E

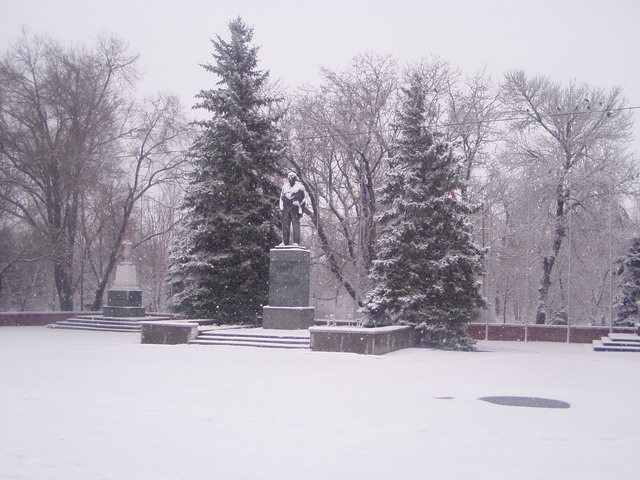
Stanitsa Tatsinskaya in winter

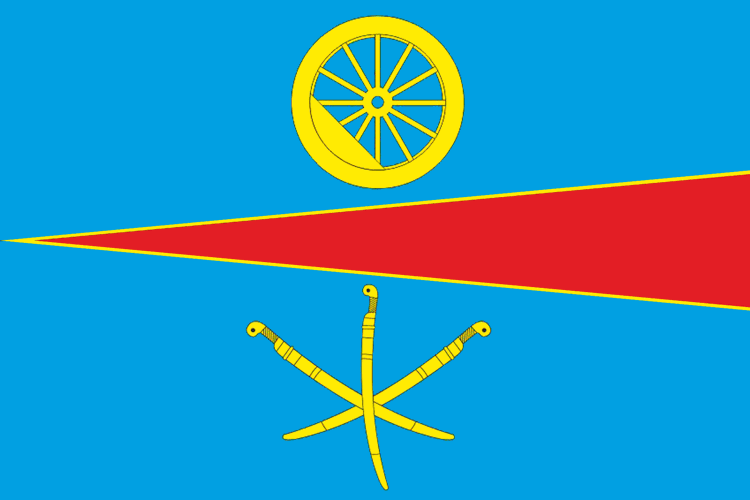
Flag of Tatsinskaya

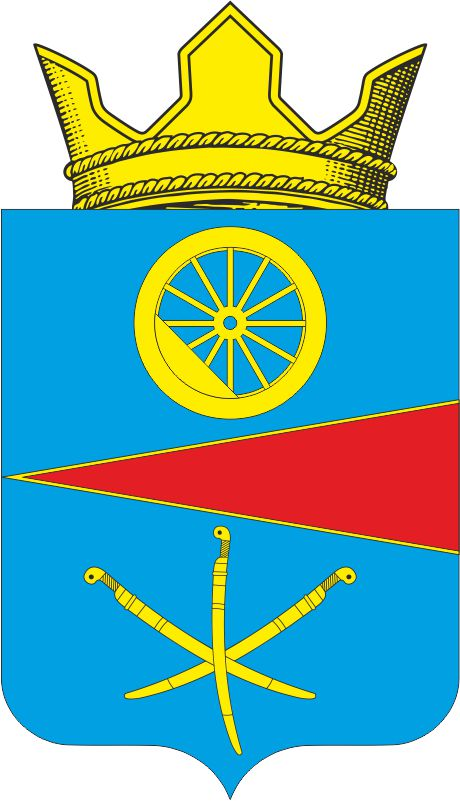
Coat of arms of Tatsinskaya

Tatsinskaya (Russian: Тацинская) is a rural locality (a stanitsa) and the administrative center of Tatsinsky District, Rostov Oblast, Russia. Population: 9,980 (2010 census); 11,275 (2002 census); 10,834 (1989 Soviet census).
