= Basargino =

Basargino Басаргино
- Settlement
- Location within Altai Krai Location within Russia
- Coordinates: 51°44′N 85°25′E
- Country: Russia
- Region: Altai Krai
- District: Altaysky District
- Time zone: UTC+7:00

Basargino (Russian: Басаргино) is a rural locality (a settlement) in Proletarsky Selsoviet, Altaysky District, Altai Krai, Russia. The population was 1 as of 2013. There are 4 streets.

== Geography ==
Basargino is located 31 km south of Altayskoye (the district's administrative centre) by road. Komar is the nearest rural locality.
