= Karpovka, Volgograd Oblast =

Karpovka Карповка
- Selo
- Location within Volgograd Oblast Location within Russia
- Coordinates: 48°42′N 43°58′E
- Country: Russia
- Region: Volgograd Oblast
- District: Gorodishchensky District
- Time zone: UTC+4:00

Karpovka (Russian: Карповка) is a rural locality (a selo) and the administrative center of Karpovskoye Rural Settlement, Gorodishchensky District, Volgograd Oblast, Russia. The population was 1,591 as of 2010. There are 15 streets.

== Geography ==
Karpovka is located in steppe, on the Karpovka River, 53 km (33 mi) southwest of Gorodishche (the district's administrative centre) by road. Prudboy is the nearest rural locality.
