= Volgograd International Airport =

Airport in Russia

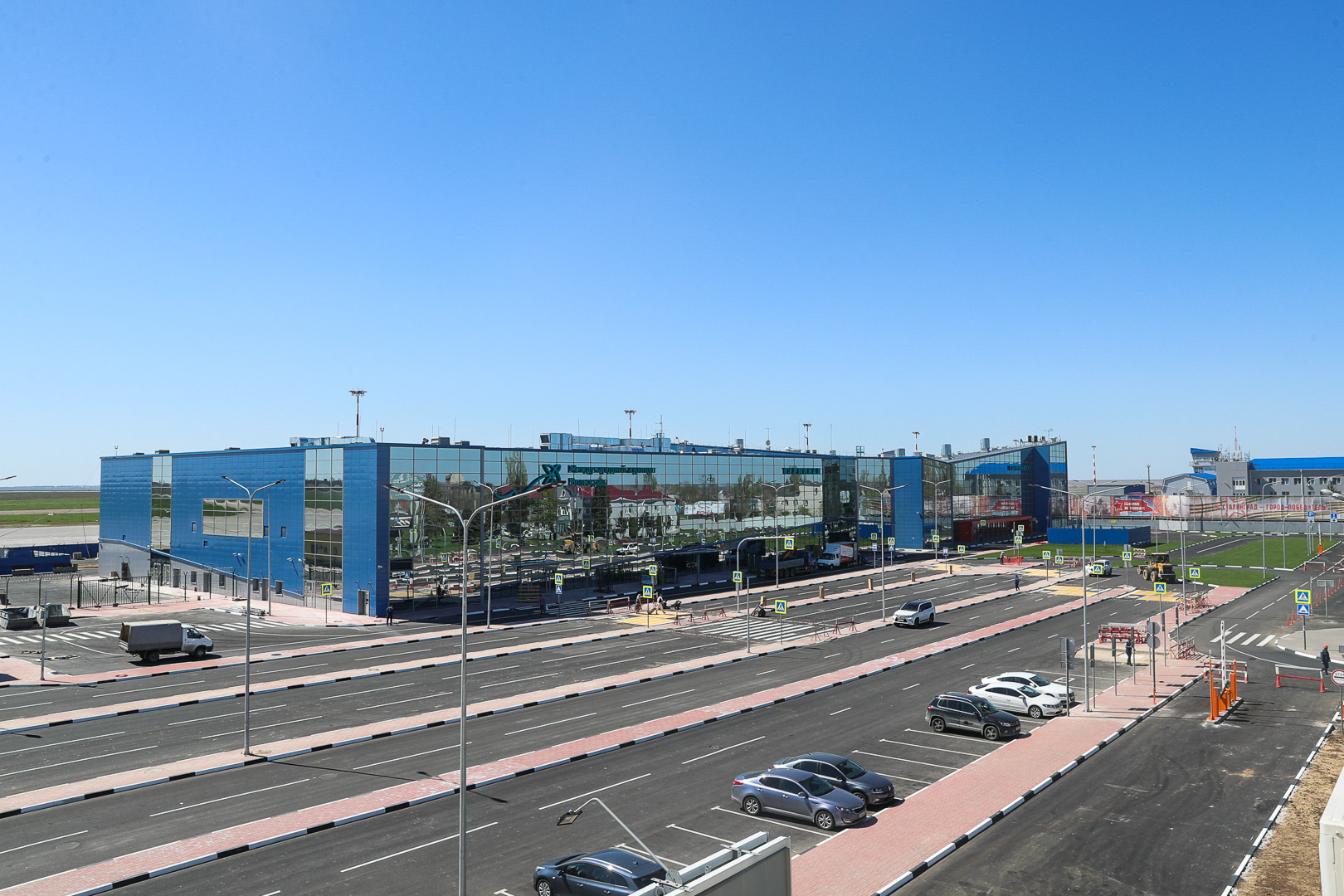
- IATA: VOG; ICAO: URWW

Summary
- Airport type: Public
- Operator: JSC "Volgograd International Airport"
- Serves: Volgograd
- Location: Gumrak, Volgograd, Russia
- Elevation AMSL: 482 ft (147 m)
- Coordinates: 48°46′54″N 44°20′48″E
- Website: AirportVolgograd.ru

Map
- Location of airport in European Russia VOG (Russia)

Runways
Direction	Length		Surface
Direction	ft	m	Surface
11/29 (Closed)	7,580	2,300	Asphalt
06/24	10,761	3,280	Asphalt

Statistics (2018)
- Passengers: 1,142,878
- Sources: Russian Federal Air Transport Agency (see also provisional 2018 statistics)

Volgograd International Airport, symbolically referred to as Stalingrad International Airport since April 2025 (Russian: Международный Аэропорт Сталинград; IATA: VOG, ICAO: URWW), is an airport located 15 km northwest of the city of Volgograd, formerly Stalingrad, in Russia. It comprises a civilian airport built on top of an older military runway (3300 m), now demolished. The terminal area parks 42 medium/large aircraft and 91 small aircraft.

A military training unit was present at Gumrak as late as 1994, the 706 UAP (706th Aviation Training Regiment), using Aero L-39 aircraft. However a more recent report puts 706 UAP at Beketovsk until 1997. Stalingrad Airport served as base for Air Volga. When the airline went bankrupt in April 2010, its aircraft and most of the routes were taken over by RusLine.

In 2012 it was announced that Volgograd Airport would have a new terminal and runway built which would bring the airport up to European standards, it was being built in 2017 and should be completed sometime in 2017.

== Battle of Stalingrad ==
The airport, then named Gumrak Airport, was used by the German 6th Army as fuel and supply depot (alongside Pitomnik Airfield) during the Battle of Stalingrad in 1942–43. After the fall of Pitomnik on 17 January 1943, Gumrak was the only one of seven airfields around Stalingrad still in German hands. On 22 January, a last He 111 aircraft left the airfield with 19 wounded soldiers, the last flight out of Stalingrad for the 6th Army. Gumrak eventually was captured by the 293rd Rifle Division on 23 January, leaving the 6th Army without any means of direct support.

On 29 April 2025, the airport, which was renamed into Volgograd Airport following the city's renaming in 1961, was renamed again as Stalingrad International Airport following a decree by Russian president Vladimir Putin in memory of the battle. According to Volgograd regional Governor Andrey Bocharov, the idea to rename the airport came after veterans of the Russo-Ukrainian war requested the name change. However the renaming was symbolic and did not affect the official name of the airport nor did it affect the airport's IATA code.

== Airport expansion for 2018 FIFA World Cup ==
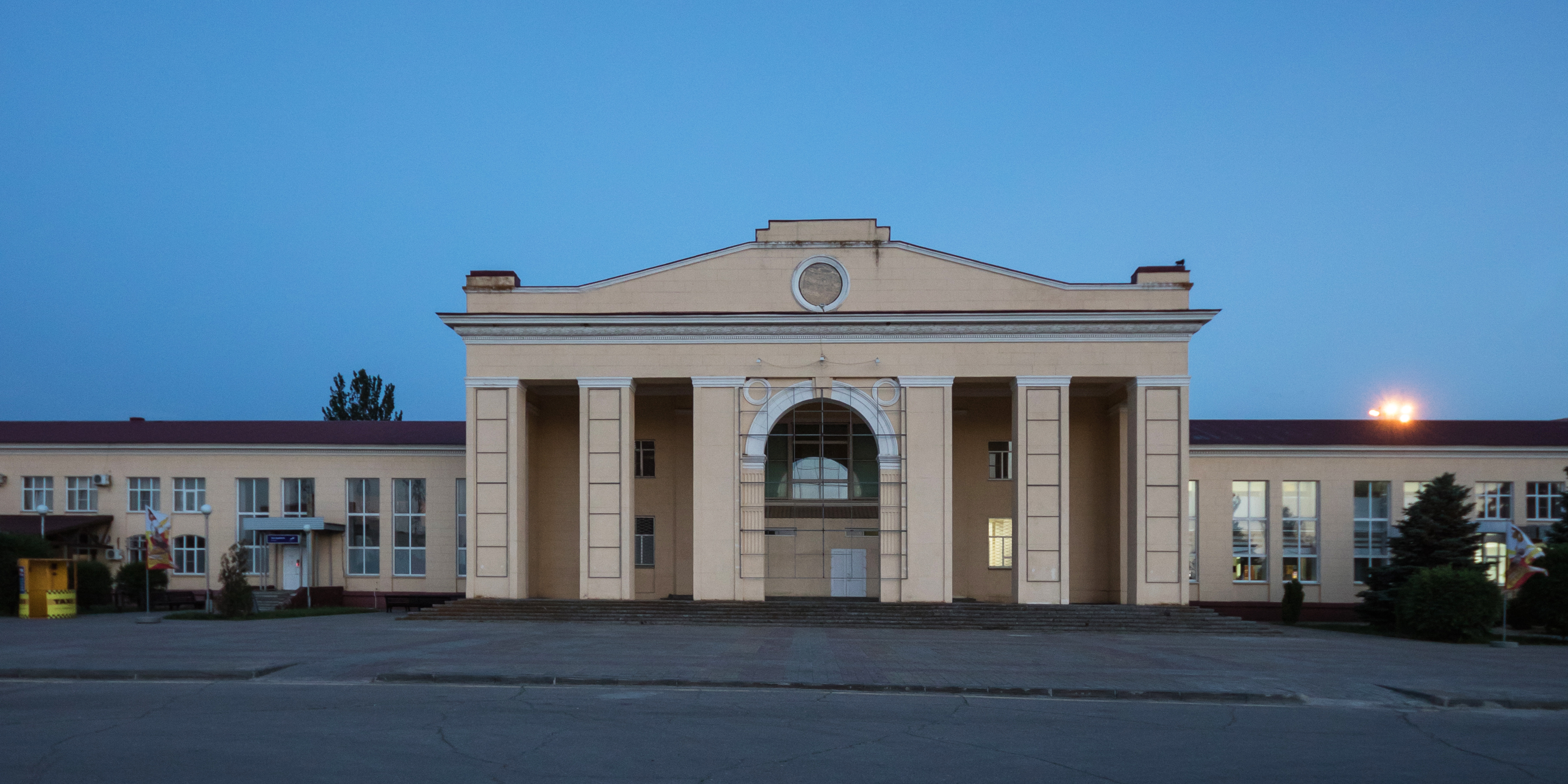
Old terminal building, that was demolished in 2016

In 2016, the new terminal of the airport was opened for international flights. Straight after opening, the first terminal building was demolished to give more space for a new terminal extension that is planned to be equipped with air-bridges. The construction is planned to finish before 9 May, where the terminal will open for passenger service and will integrate with terminal C. The current Soviet-built building (Terminal A) is planned to convert into a bus terminal.

On 8 May 2018, the new terminal B for domestic flights was opened for passengers. The new runway was also opened on that day. The last third stage of the airport re-construction will be integrating terminals B and C with the walking gallery and construction of air-bridges. The works will commence after FIFA-2018 finishes.

== Airlines and destinations ==
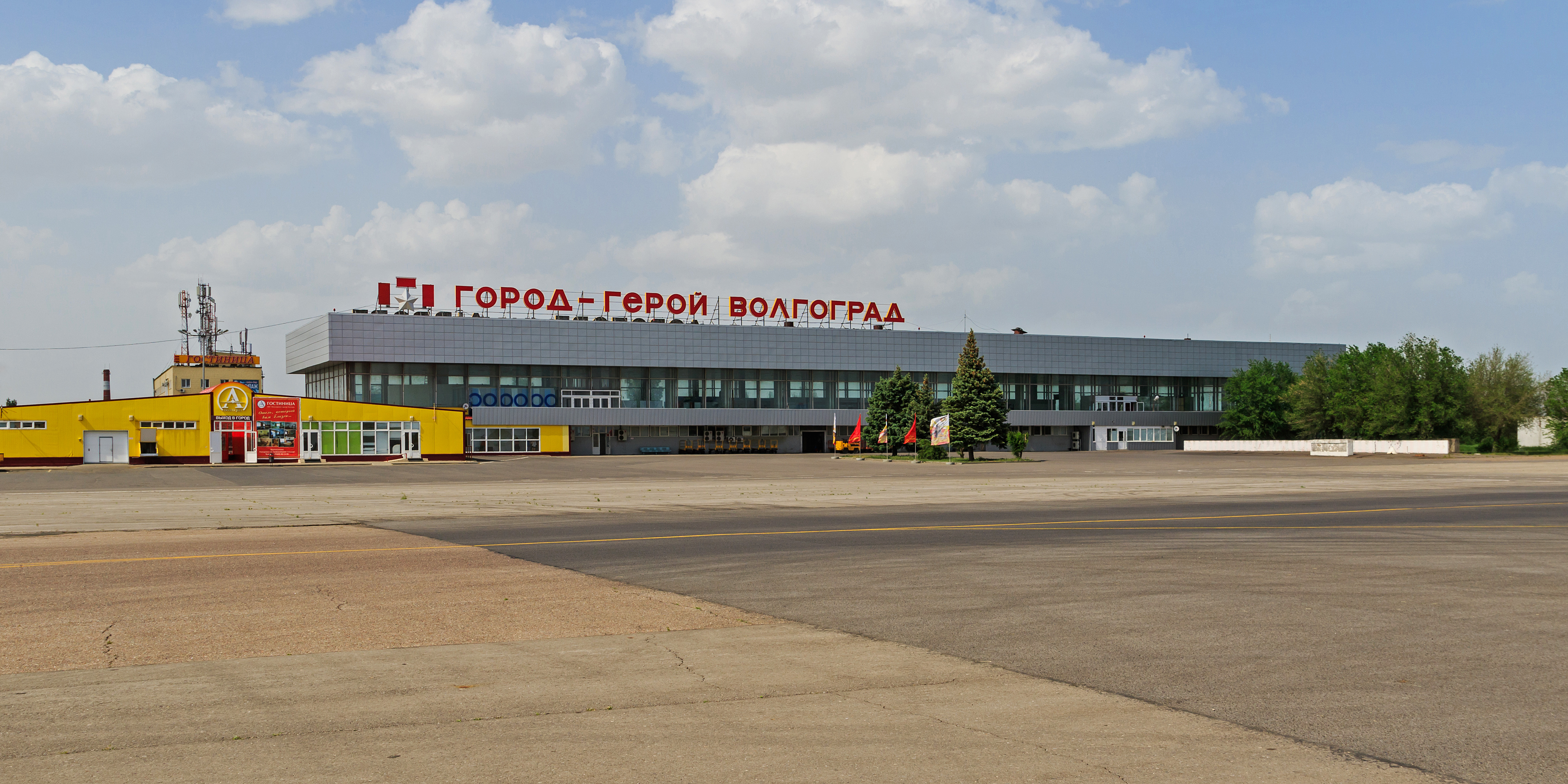
Soviet-built terminal, currently working for international flights, that is due to be converted into an interchange center to rail and bus transports after FIFA-2018.

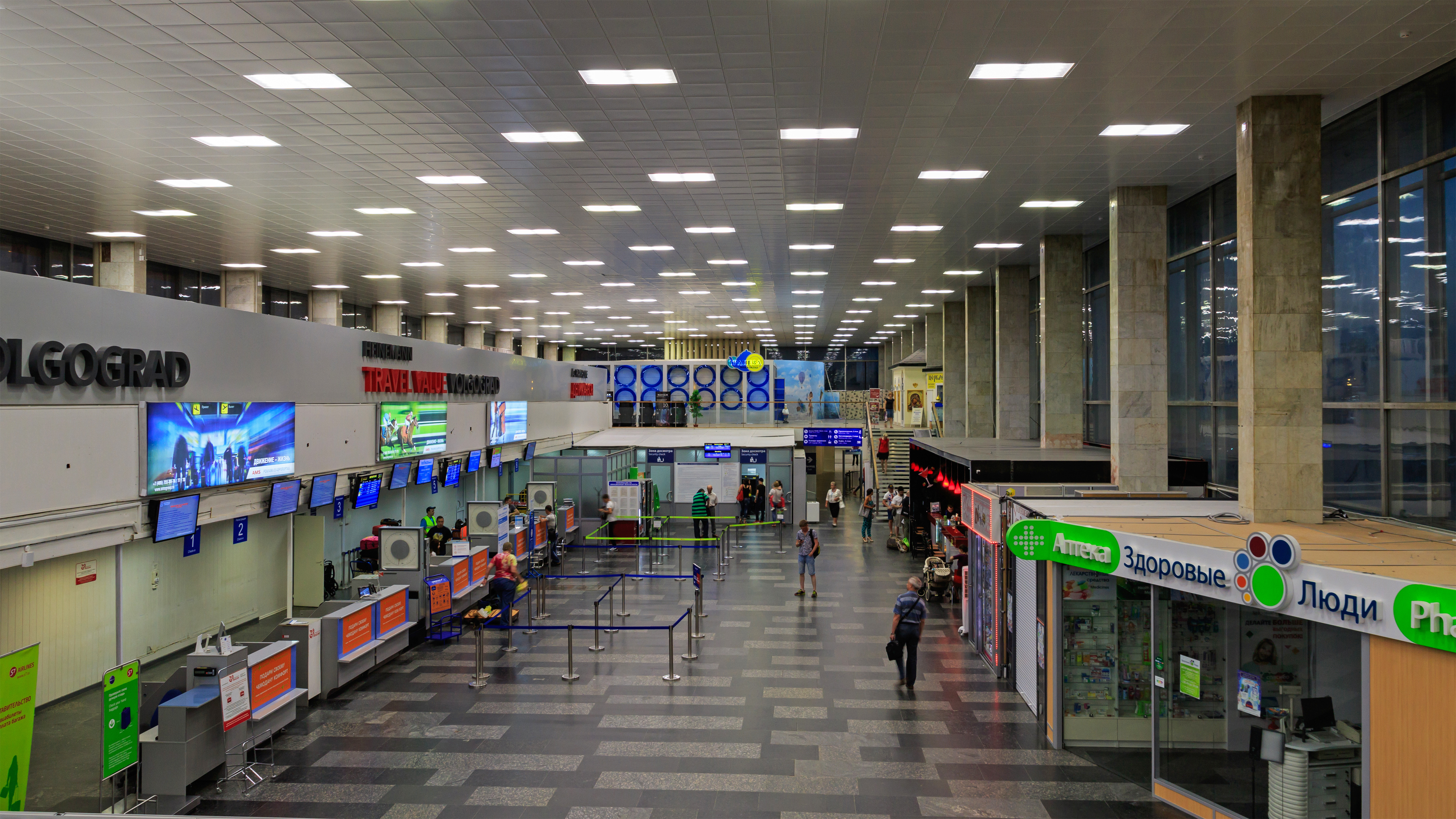
Old terminal interior

Airlines	Destinations
Aeroflot	Moscow–Sheremetyevo, Saint Petersburg
Air Anka	Seasonal charter: Antalya
Air Cairo	Seasonal charter: Sharm El Sheikh
AlMasria Universal Airlines	Seasonal charter: Hurghada
flydubai	Dubai–International
Ikar	Kaliningrad
Nordstar Airlines	Norilsk, Yekaterinburg
Pobeda	Moscow–Sheremetyevo, Saint Petersburg
Red Wings Airlines	Seasonal: Batumi
Rossiya Airlines	Moscow–Sheremetyevo, Saint Petersburg, Yerevan
S7 Airlines	Moscow–Domodedovo, Novosibirsk
Ural Airlines	Seasonal charter: Antalya
Utair	Seasonal: Surgut

== Transportation ==
=== Bus ===
The current soviet-built terminal, after terminal B commences its operations in May, will be converted to the bus terminal. It was planned to do before FIFA World Cup 2018, but due to technical reasons, it will commence its services later.

=== Rail ===
The railway station is integrated with Terminal A, which in future plans to turn into bus terminal. The construction of the line was finished in April 2018, tested with the first train on 11 May and commenced the first journey on 17 May 2018. The train goes to Railway Terminal Volgograd-1 and the journey takes 30 minutes.

The train to and from Volgograd City Zone travels daily.

== See also ==
- List of the busiest airports in the former USSR
