= December 1918 =

Month in 1918

| << | December 1918 | | | | | >> |
| Su | Mo | Tu | We | Th | Fr | Sa |
| 1 | 2 | 3 | 4 | 5 | 6 | 7 |
| 8 | 9 | 10 | 11 | 12 | 13 | 14 |
| 15 | 16 | 17 | 18 | 19 | 20 | 21 |
| 22 | 23 | 24 | 25 | 26 | 27 | 28 |
| 29 | 30 | 31 |

The following events occurred in December 1918:

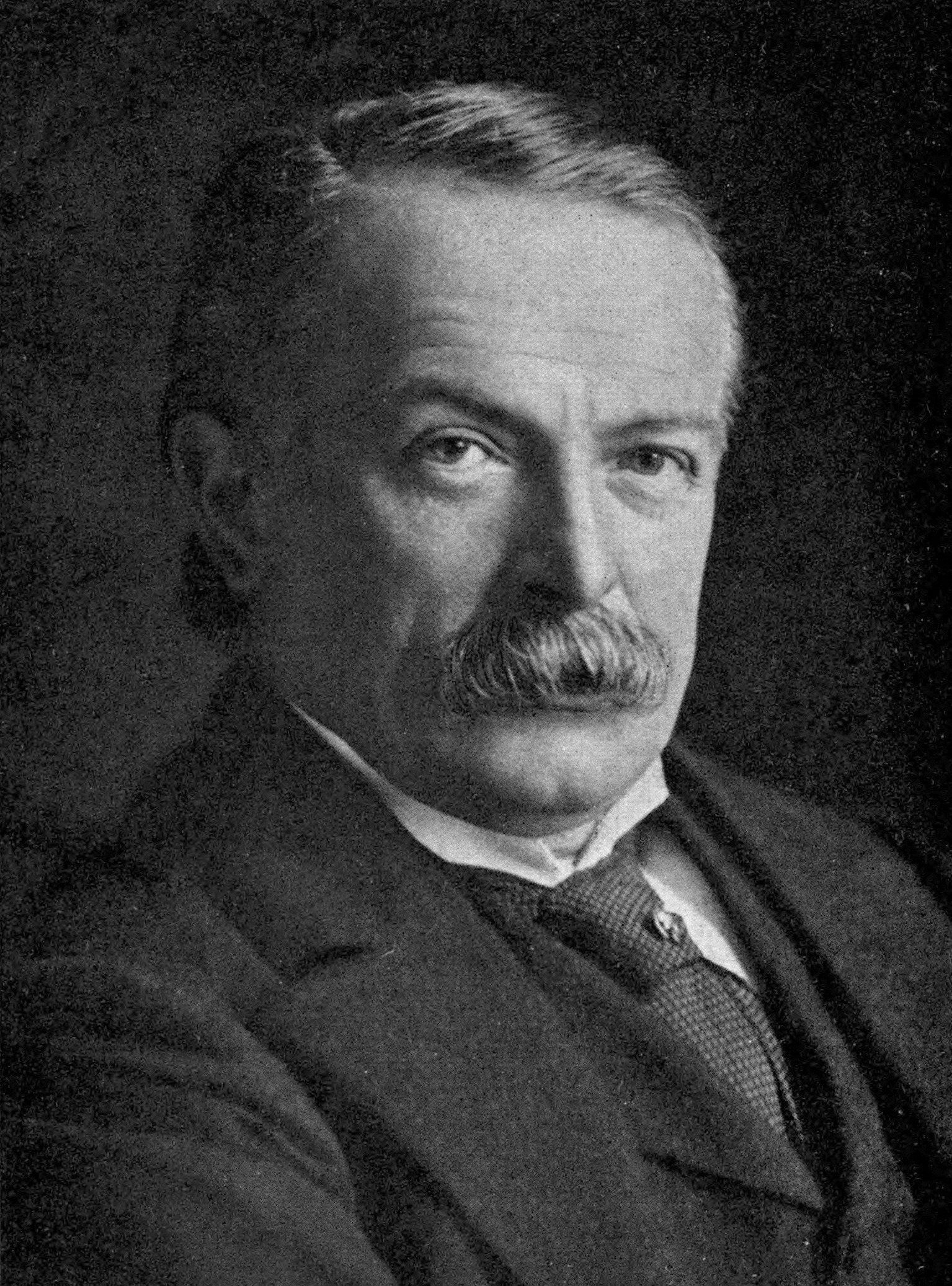
David Lloyd George, re-elected as Prime Minister of the United Kingdom.

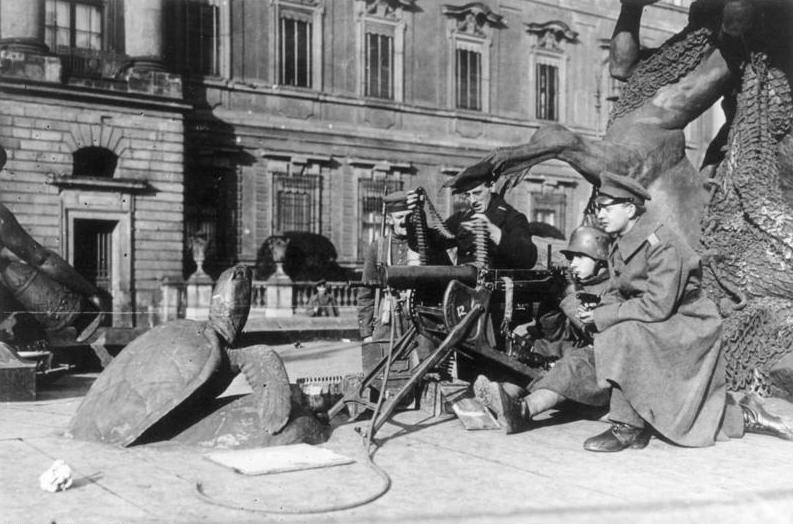
Paramilitary soldiers man a machine gun during an uprising in Berlin on Christmas Eve.

== December 1, 1918 (Sunday) ==
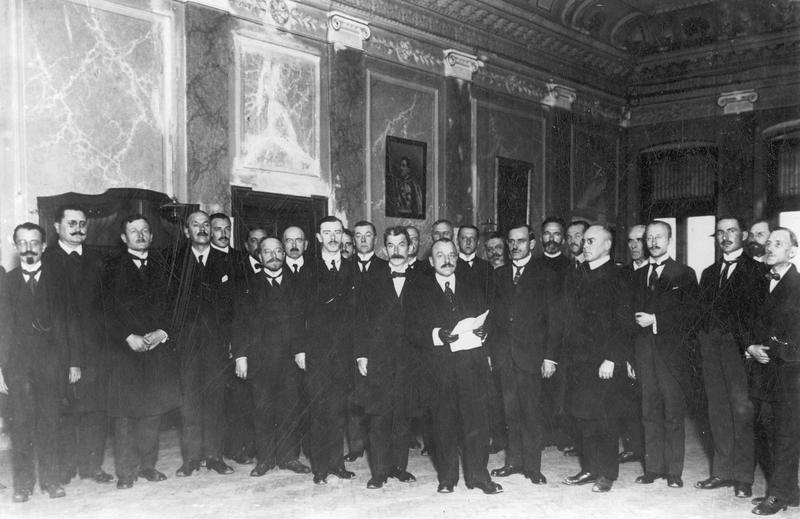
Delegation led by Vice-President Ante Pavelić reading the address proclaiming the creation of the Kingdom of Yugoslavia in front of regent Alexander Karađorđević.

Romanians celebrate the unification of Transylvania and other states with Romania.

- The union of Transylvania with Romania was proclaimed, after the Great National Assembly of Alba Iulia passed a resolution to allow Transylvania, Banat, Crișana, and the Satumare and Maramureș regions to unite with Romania.
- The Kingdom of Yugoslavia was proclaimed by Alexander Karađorđević, prince regent of the Kingdom of Serbia, after an agreement was reached by the State of Slovenes, Croats and Serbs, Kingdom of Serbia, and Kingdom of Montenegro to unite under one sovereignty.
- Iceland regained independence from Denmark through the Danish–Icelandic Act of Union, but remained in personal union with the King of Denmark, who also became the King of Iceland until 1944.
- The Allies began their occupation of the Rhineland that bordered Germany and France, which would continue until 1930.
- The Kars Republic was established in northeastern Turkey but was abolished in six months by the British High Commissioner.
- Pope Benedict released the encyclical Quod iam diu (That which has long been) that requested all Catholics everywhere in the world, no matter which side they were on, to pray for a lasting peace and for those who are entrusted to make it during the upcoming peace negotiations in France.
- The second annual Pulitzer Prizes were awarded in the United States, including the first awards for fiction:
  - The New York Times for Public Service
  - Harold A. Littledale of the New York Evening Post for Reporting
  - Louisville Courier Journal for Editorial Writing
  - Minna Lewinson and Henry Beetle Hough, students at the School of Journalism, Columbia University for the Newspaper History Award
  - Ernest Poole for the novel His Family
  - Jesse Lynch Williams for the drama Why Marry?
  - Sara Teasdale for the poetry collection Love Songs
  - James Ford Rhodes for the history of the American Civil War
  - William Cabell Bruce for the biography on Benjamin Franklin
- The Farm Workers Union of Uppland was established in Uppland, Sweden.
- Born: Shunpei Uto, Japanese swimmer, silver and bronze medalist at the 1936 Summer Olympics; in Kakegawa, Shizuoka, Japan (d. unknown)
- Died:
  - Peter Hume Brown, 68, Scottish historian, proponent of Scottish history as a discipline, member of the Privy Council of Scotland (b. 1849)
  - Margit Kaffka, 38, Hungarian poet, first major female Hungarian writer, member of the Nyugat literary group; died of influenza (b. 1880)

== December 2, 1918 (Monday) ==
- U.S. President Woodrow Wilson addressed the 65th United States Congress where he cited the number of American men who enlisted and served in World War I, which ended about a month ago with an armistice. He concluded: "And throughout it all how fine the spirit of the nation was: what unity of purpose, what untiring zeal!"
- Azerbaijani municipal leader Peri-Khan Sofiyeva was elected to serve on a local counsel for the village council of Karajala, in the Kakheti Region of Georgia, becoming the first Muslim women ever to be elected to public office.
- Died: Edmond Rostand, 50, French poet and playwright, best known for the plays Cyrano de Bergerac and Les Romanesques which was adapted as the musical The Fantasticks; died of influenza (b. 1868)

== December 3, 1918 (Tuesday) ==
- A small annular solar eclipse covered only 94% of the Sun in a broad path up to 236.4 km wide, and lasted 7 minutes and 5.69 seconds. The eclipse was seen across much of South America including Santiago, Buenos Aires, and Montevideo, as well as portions of South West Africa.
- With tensions rising between Romania and the newly formed state of Yugoslavia over occupied space in the Banat Republic, 15,000 French troops under command of Generals Paul Prosper Henrys and Henri Mathias Berthelot occupied the capital city of Timișoara to prevent a regional war from breaking out.
- Faced by superior strength from the invading Red Army, the government of the Belarusian Democratic Republic fled Minsk and retreated to Smolensk, Belarus.
- German Expressionist artists and architects formed the November Group, after the month of the German Revolution, and shortly afterwards merged with the Workers Council for Art.
- Born: Abdul Haris Nasution, Indonesian army officer, 12th Minister of Defence of Indonesia; in North Sumatra, Dutch East Indies (d. 2000)
- Died: John Percival, 84, British clergy and academic, Bishop of Hereford for the Church of England from 1896 to 1917, first headmaster of Clifton College and president of Trinity College, Oxford (b. 1834)

== December 4, 1918 (Wednesday) ==
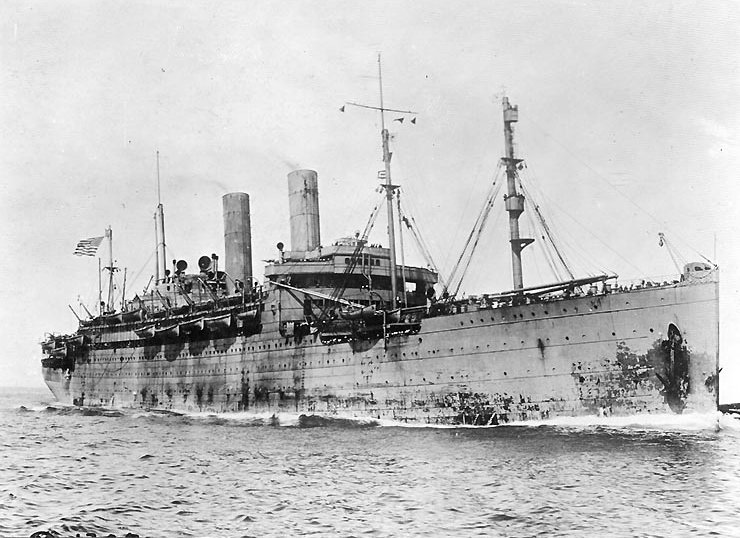
SS George Washington

- U.S. President Woodrow Wilson departed to Europe aboard the SS George Washington for the Paris Peace Conference, becoming the first American president to travel to any foreign country while holding office.
- Belgian politician Frans Van Cauwelaert established the daily newspaper The Standard as the voice for the Christian Democratic and Flemish political party, though the paper eventually moved away from its ideological roots.
- Born:
  - Isabel McNeill Carley, American composer and music educator, co-founder of the American Orff-Schulwerk Association; in Chicago (d. 2011)
  - Gong Qiuxia, Chinese singer, pioneer of Mandopop; in Chongming, China (d. 2004)
  - John Bell Williams, American politician, 55th Governor of Mississippi; in Raymond, Mississippi (d. 1983)
  - Robert Ettinger, American academic, promoter of cryonics, founder of the Immortalist Society; in Atlantic City, New Jersey (d. 2011)
- Died: Teriivaetua, 49, Tahitian noble, heiress of the Kingdom of Tahiti; died of influenza (b. 1869)

== December 5, 1918 (Thursday) ==
- The Lemko Republic was established with the intention of uniting with Soviet Russia but was dissolved into Poland within two years.
- Estonian War of Independence – British light cruiser HMS Cassandra struck a mine and sank near Saaremaa in the Baltic Sea, killing 11 sailors.
- Born:
  - Charity Adams Earley, American army officer, first African American woman to be an officer in the Women's Auxiliary Army Corps; in Kitrell, North Carolina (d. 2002)
  - Jagan Nath Azad, Pakistani poet, president of Anjuman-i Taraqqi-i Urdu from 1993 to 2004; in Isakhel, British India (d. 2004)
  - Bud Mahurin, American air force officer, commander of the 1st Fighter Group during the Korean War, recipient of the Silver Star, Distinguished Service Cross, Distinguished Flying Crosses, and seven Air Medals; in Benton Harbor, Michigan (d. 2010)
- Died: Schalk Willem Burger, 66, South African state leader, 6th State President of the South African Republic (b. 1852)

== December 6, 1918 (Friday) ==
König

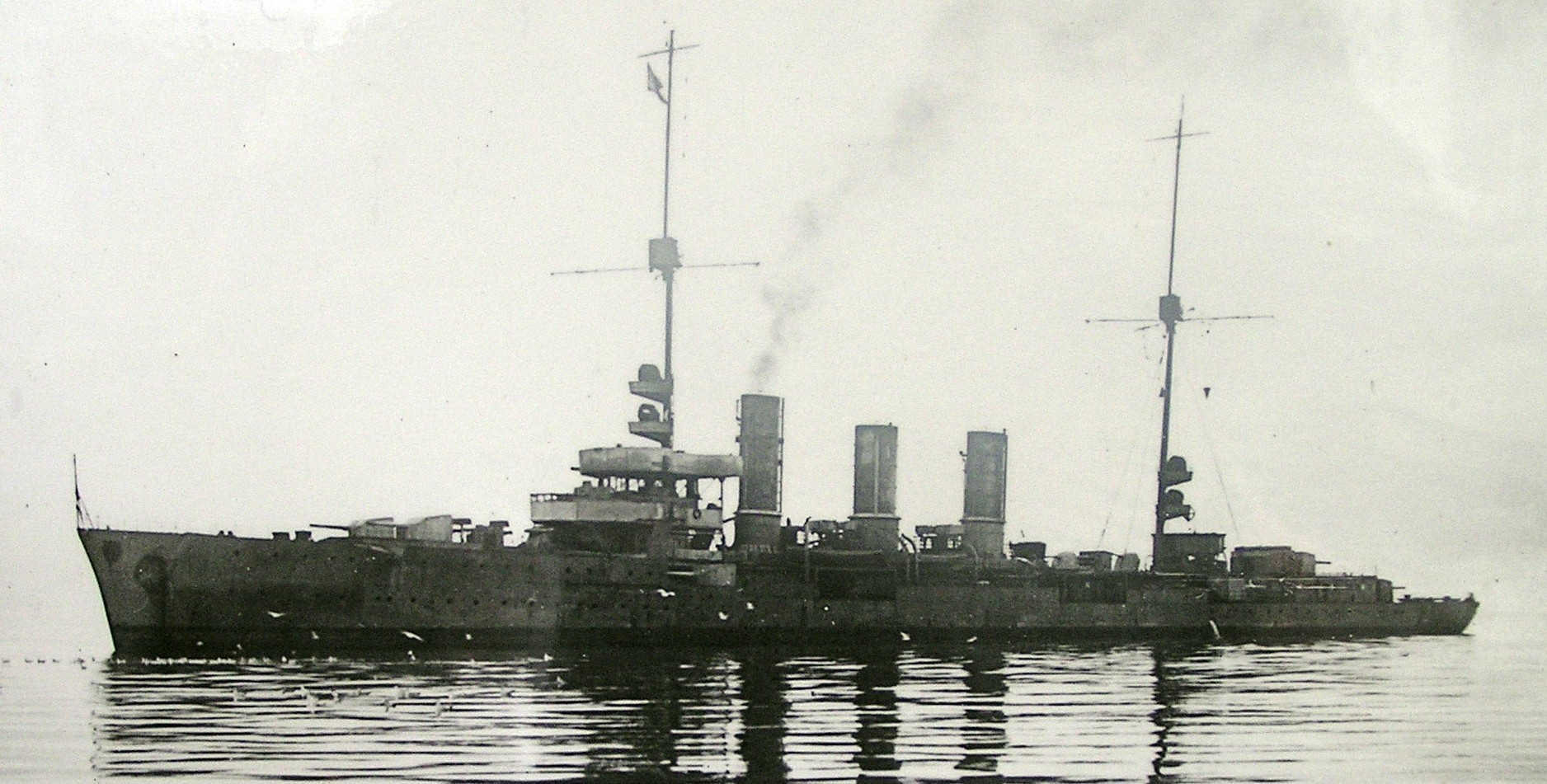
Dresden

- An earthquake measuring 7.2 in magnitude struck western side of Vancouver Island, British Columbia. Because of the sparsely populated area, the most noted damage was to the Estevan Point Lighthouse.
- German battleship König and light cruiser Dresden reached Scapa Flow off the coast of Scotland to join the rest of the interned Imperial German Navy High Seas Fleet.
- The Port Adelaide Workers Memorial was unveiled in Port Adelaide, Australia to commemorate labor activists in the city and throughout the country. The memorial was funded by the Australian Labor Party and United Trades and Labour Council of South Australia.
- Born: Harold Hopkins, British physicist, leading researcher into optics leading to development of the zoom lens, fiberscope, the rod lens for keyhole surgery, and borescopes; in Leicester, England (d. 1994)

== December 7, 1918 (Saturday) ==
- Armeno-Georgian War – A Georgian force of 200 men under command of Varden Tsulukidze was sent to quell a local rising at the village of Uzunlar in the disputed region of Borchaly Uyezd, Georgia (now part of Lori Province, Armenia) but were driven back.
- The Baltische Landeswehr were established as the armed forces for the Baltic German nobility, with the goal to defend the newly independent nations of Estonia and Latvia from being occupied by the advancing Red Army.
- Died: Frank Wilson, 59, Australian politician, 9th Premier of Western Australia (b. 1859)

== December 8, 1918 (Sunday) ==
- The National Progressive Party of Finland was established.
- The St Patrick's Basilica Catholic Church in Oamaru, New Zealand was completed, 25 years after initial construction. The church's architect, Francis Petre, was commemorated in the opening; he died two days later.
- The silent film period drama Arizona, starring Douglas Fairbanks and directed by Albert Parker, was released through Famous Players–Lasky. The film had been adapted from the play of the same name by Augustus Thomas.
- Born:
  - Gérard Souzay, French opera singer, best known for his collaborations with the Aix-en-Provence Festival; in Angers, France (d. 2004)
  - Sam Zoldak, American baseball player, pitcher for the St. Louis Browns, Cleveland Indians, and Philadelphia Athletics from 1944 to 1952; in New York City (d. 1966)

== December 9, 1918 (Monday) ==
- Municipal elections were held in Edmonton, Alberta, with Joseph Clarke elected as Mayor of Edmonton.
- The Young Finnish Party split apart, with National Coalition Party established as the liberal conservative arm in Finland.
- The first secondary school was established in independent Latvia.
- The sports club Fossum was established in Bærum Municipality, Norway. It now has sections on cross-country skiing, biathlon, ski jumping, alpine skiing, Nordic combined, orienteering, and association football.
- Born: Louie Welch, American politician, 54th Mayor of Houston; in Lockney, Texas (d. 2008)

== December 10, 1918 (Tuesday) ==
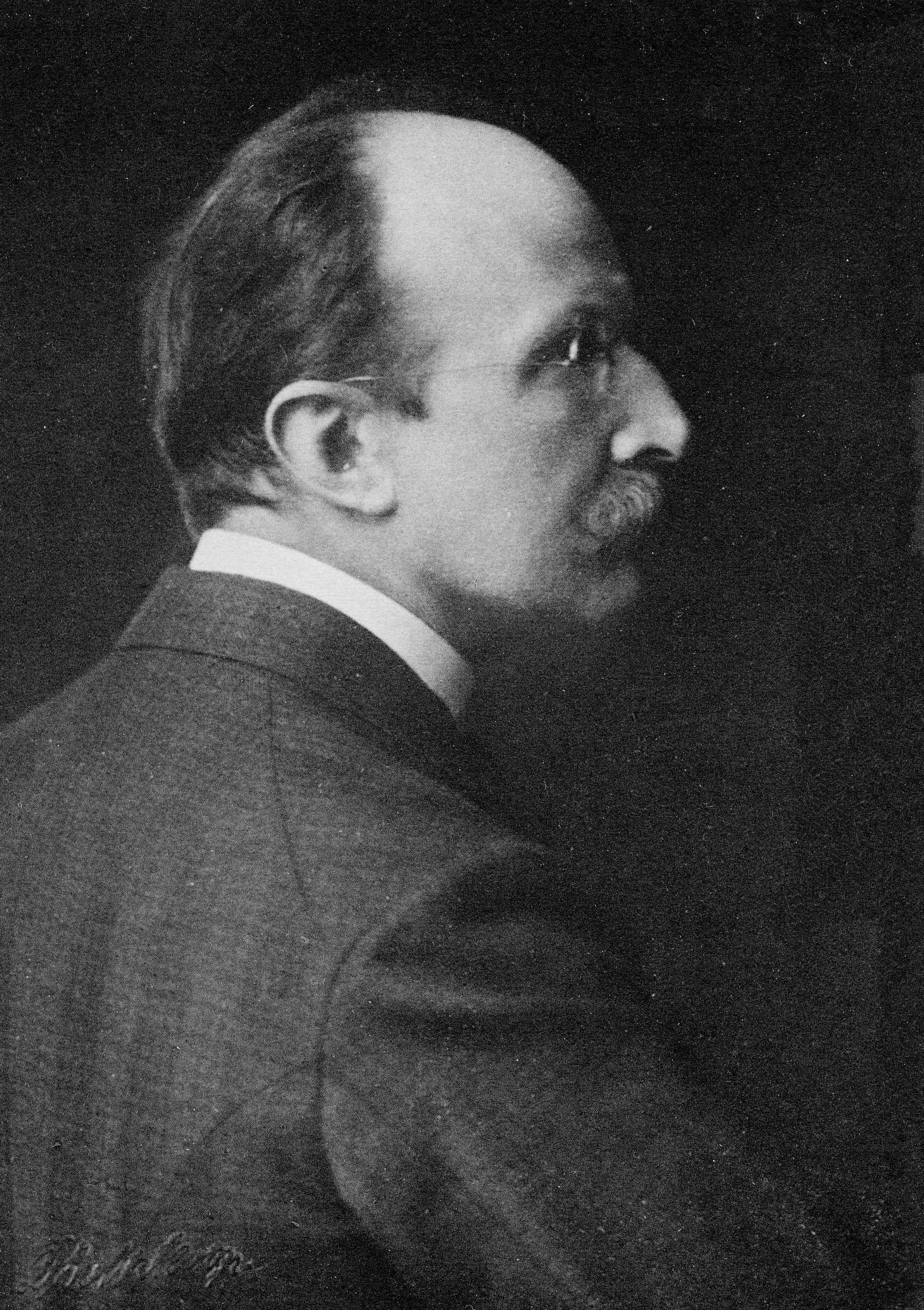
Max Planck

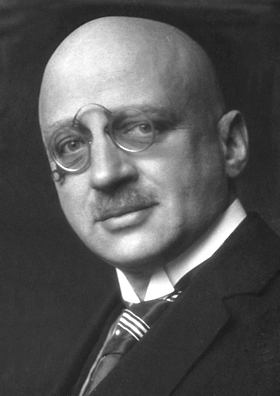
Fritz Haber

- The Red Army captured Minsk.
- Royal Australian Navy ships sailed to the Black Sea to assist the White Army in the Russian Civil War.
- Some 200 soldiers with the ANZAC Mounted Division entered the Arab village of Surafend, Palestine and massacred an estimated 40 men in retaliation for the supposed death of one of their own members of their unit by the villagers. Despite an investigation by General Edmund Allenby, the unit refused to name the key perpetrators in the massacre and no courts-martial were carried out.
- The Nobel Prize Committee selected German physicist Max Planck as recipient for the Nobel Prize in Physics and German chemist Fritz Haber for the Nobel Prize in Chemistry. No other awards were handed out that year.
- The Salangen Airport was established in Salangen Municipality, Norway.
- The Melrose Symphony Orchestra held its first concert at Melrose, Massachusetts. It remains the oldest, continuous, all-volunteer symphony orchestra in the United States.
- Uawa County was established in New Zealand. It was amalgamated with Cook County, New Zealand in 1964.

== December 11, 1918 (Wednesday) ==
- King Ferdinand signed into law the Union of Alba Iulia proclamation that allowed Transylvania, Banat, Crișana, and the Satumare and Maramureș regions to unite with Romania.
- The Socialist Party of Romania was established as a successor to the Social Democratic Party.
- The Cleveland Orchestra, founded by Cleveland philanthropist Adella Prentiss Hughes, held its first concert with Nikolai Sokoloff conducting.
- The final meeting of the National Hockey Association was held to resolve the dispute with Toronto Shamrocks hockey club owner Eddie Livingstone. Frank Calder, president of the National Hockey League, also retained leadership of the organization until he formally folded it years later.
- Born: Aleksandr Solzhenitsyn, Russian writer, recipient of the Nobel Prize in Literature, author of Cancer Ward and One Day in the Life of Ivan Denisovich; in Kislovodsk, Russia (d. 2008)
- Died:
  - Ivan Cankar, 42, Slovenian writer, member of the modernism movement in Slovenia, author of The Ward of Mary Help of Christians; died of pneumonia (b. 1876)
  - Francis Petre, 71, New Zealand architect, best known for applying Gothic Revival architecture designs for New Zealand churches including Sacred Heart Cathedral in Wellington and Cathedral of the Blessed Sacrament in Christchurch (b. 1847)

== December 12, 1918 (Thursday) ==
- Armeno-Georgian War – Georgian forces defended the towns of Sanahin (then part of Georgia but now part of Armenia), Alaverdi, Vorontsovka and Privolnoye against a major Armenian offensive.
- An airplane was launched from an airship for the first time, when U.S. Navy blimp C.1 dropped a Curtiss Jenny fighter plane into flight over Fort Tilden, New York.
- Born:
  - Joe Williams, American jazz singer, lead vocals for the Count Basie Orchestra; in Cordele, Georgia (d. 1999)
  - Emmett Smith Davis, American air force officer, commander of the 35th Fighter Squadron during World War II, recipient of the Silver Star, Legion of Merit, four Air Medals, and two Distinguished Flying Crosses; in Roosevelt, Utah (d. 2015)
  - Oleg Gazenko, Soviet space engineer, member of the Sputnik 2 mission and trainer of Laika, the first animal to go into Earth's orbit, recipient of the Order of Lenin; in Stavropol, Russia (d. 2007)

== December 13, 1918 (Friday) ==
- Brigadier General Norman MacEwen, Flight Sergeant Smith, Sergeant Crockett (fitters), and Sergeant Thomas Brown (navigator), accompanied pilots Major A.C.S. Maclaren and Captain Robert Halley who set out on the first flight from England to India in a Handley aircraft. The flight included stops in Rome, Malta, Cairo, Baghdad, before they finally reached Karachi on January 15.
- Died:
  - Nikolay Figner, 61, Russian opera singer, member of famous opera duo Nikolay and Medea (b. 1857)
  - Emory Speer, 70, American politician, jurist, and United States district judge from 1885 until 1918 (b. 1848)

== December 14, 1918 (Saturday) ==
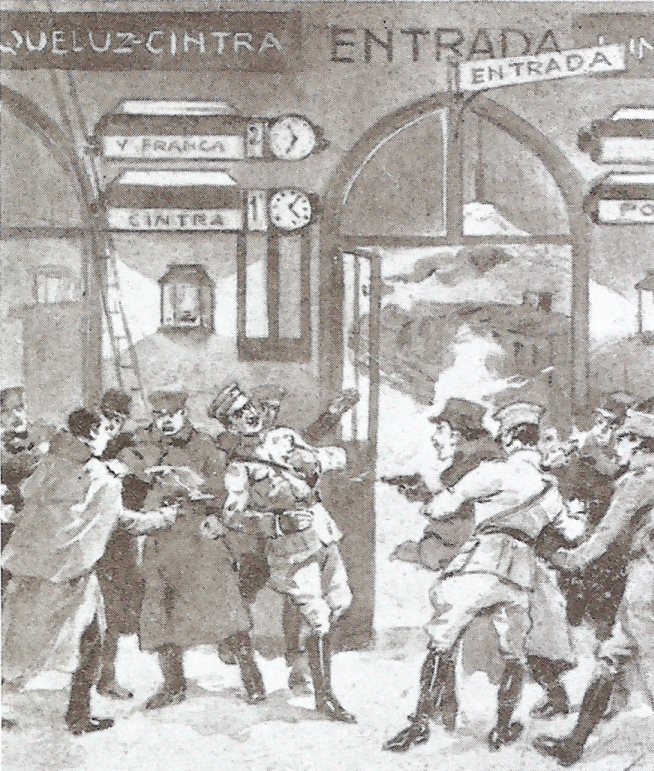
Newspaper illustration depicting José Júlio da Costa assassinating Portuguese President Sidónio Pais at the main rail station in Lisbon.

- The United Kingdom held its first national general election since 1910, resulting in the coalition government of David Lloyd George and Bonar Law being re-elected by a landslide. It was the first national election at which women were entitled to vote or stand, while the male franchise was extended.
- At the part of general election in Ireland, which was still part of the United Kingdom, Sinn Féin defeated the moderate Irish Parliamentary Party, winning 73 of the 105 seats, and set the stage for Irish independence.
- Armeno-Georgian War – An Armenian force of 6,500 forced the Georgians out of Sanahin, Alaverdi, Vorontsovka and Privolnoye at a cost of 100 Georgian casualties. A Georgian force of 6,500 men under command of Abel Makashvili also held off attacks against Armenia in Akhalkalaki, Georgia.
- Sidónio Pais, President of Portugal, was shot and fatally wounded by left-wing political activist José Júlio da Costa at the Lisbon railway station.
- Pavlo Skoropadskyi was forced out as leader of the Ukrainian State and replaced by a directorate led by Volodymyr Vynnychenko, which led to the country becoming a Soviet republic.
- Prince Frederick Charles renounced the throne for the Kingdom of Finland originally awarded to him on October 9 due to the uncertainty as to whether the Finnish population would support a monarchy that had been associated with the old German Empire.
- Composer Giacomo Puccini premiered his opera collection Il trittico (The Triptych) at the Metropolitan Opera in New York City.
- Born:
  - James T. Aubrey, American television producer, creator of 1960s comedy hits The Beverly Hillbillies and Gilligan's Island; in LaSalle, Illinois (d. 1994)
  - B. K. S. Iyengar, Indian yoga guru, founder of Iyengar Yoga; in Mysore State, British India (d. 2014)
  - Grant Sawyer, American politician, 21st Governor of Nevada; in Twin Falls, Idaho (d. 1996)

== December 15, 1918 (Sunday) ==
- Film director Cecil B. DeMille released a second remake of the film western The Squaw Man originally released just four years earlier, based on an experiment that a good film is based on a good story (DeMille would remake it a third time in 1931 when sound in film had become a regular feature). The movie became the fourth-biggest hit of the year. Unfortunately, no full cuts of the film have survived.
- Born:
  - Jeff Chandler, American actor, best known for his Oscar-nominated role of Cochise in Broken Arrow, as well as roles in Sword in the Desert and Female on the Beach; in New York City (d. 1961)
  - Chihiro Iwasaki, Japanese artist, noted illustrator for children's literature including Totto-Chan: The Little Girl at the Window; in Takefu, Fukui, Japan (d. 1974)

== December 16, 1918 (Monday) ==
- The Lithuanian Soviet Socialist Republic was established by a Soviet provisional government headed by Vincas Mickevičius-Kapsukas, but merged with Byelorussia to become a new Soviet republic in 1919.
- João do Canto e Castro was elected as the fifth President of Portugal to replace the deceased Sidónio Pais who has been assassinated two days earlier.
- The Communist Party of Poland was established.
- The American women's suffrage group Silent Sentinels began burning copies of U.S. President Woodrow Wilson's statement supporting a constitutional amendment to extend the right to vote for women in watch fires in front of the White House following the amendment's failure to pass in the United States Senate.
- The Renaissance Cleveland Hotel, a 1000-room accommodation built at a cost of $4.5 million, opened in Cleveland.
- The Armenian sports and scouting organization Homenetmen was established in Constantinople by Armenian athletes Shavarsh Krissian, Hovhannes Hintliyan, and Krikor Hagopian.
- Died: Edward William Cole, 86, Australian publisher, founder of Coles Book Arcade in Melbourne and Cole's Funny Picture Book (d. 1832)

== December 17, 1918 (Tuesday) ==
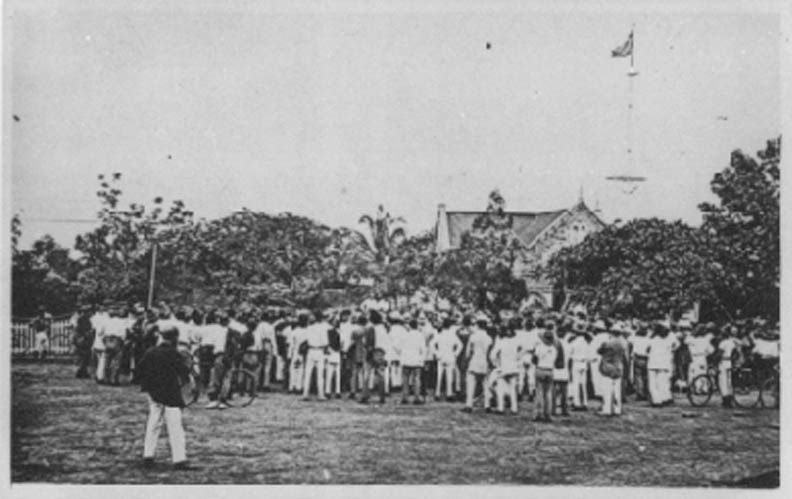
Demonstrators against an alcohol tax gather at Government House in Darwin, Australia.

- The Latvian Socialist Soviet Republic was established with Pēteris Stučka as leader.
- Armeno-Georgian War – Georgian forces retreated by train out of Borchaly Uyezd, Georgia.
- Darwin rebellion – Around 1,000 disaffected workers marched on the government house in Darwin, Australia, demanding the resignation of John A. Gilruth, Administrator of the Northern Territory over a tax on alcohol. Gilruth refused and further unrest forced the Australian government to send a Royal Australian Navy ship to the city to provide further control. Public pressure eventually forced Gilruth to leave the city in February.
- German filmmaker Ernst Lubitsch released his version of Carmen, based on the novella by Prosper Mérimée and more popularly known for the opera by Georges Bizet, with Polish actress Pola Negri playing the title role.
- The Helsinki Philharmonic Orchestra delivered the first performance of Symphony No. 2 by Finnish composer Leevi Madetoja, with Robert Kajanus conducting.
- Died: John Green Brady, 71, American politician, 5th Governor of the District of Alaska (b. 1847)

== December 18, 1918 (Wednesday) ==
- Estonian War of Independence – The Latvian Riflemen allied with the Red Army captured Valga, Estonia.
- Armeno-Georgian War – An encircled Georgian unit defending the retreating flank at Ayrum, Georgia broke out and escaped, but at a cost of 560 casualties. Meanwhile, the Armenians began to assault the Georgian-held town of Sadakhlo.
- The first meeting of the Workers Defense Union, led by labor activist Elizabeth Gurley Flynn, was held in New York City with delegates from 163 trade unions, political groups, and social service organizations.
- Armenpress, the main news agency for Armenia, was established.
- Born: Hanna Weynerowska, or Kali, Polish-American painter, member of the Surrealism movement, member of the Polish resistance movement in World War II; in Warsaw (d. 1998)
- Died: Frank Thornton, 73, English actor, understudy to actor George Grossmith for the D'Oyly Carte Opera Company, and comedic lead roles in The Private Secretary and Charley's Aunt (b. 1845)

== December 19, 1918 (Thursday) ==
- Armeno-Georgian War – Armenian forces captured Shulaveri, Georgia.
- The German National People's Party was established with Oskar Hergt as party leader.
- Ripley's Believe It or Not! first appeared as a cartoon under the title Champs and Chumps in The New York Globe.
- Born: Professor Longhair, American jazz musician, known for his jazz piano recordings including Crawfish Fiesta and New Orleans Piano; in Bogalusa, Louisiana (d. 1980)

== December 20, 1918 (Friday) ==
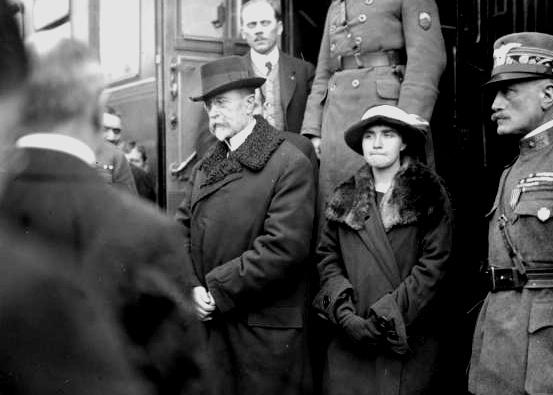
Czech president Tomáš Masaryk and his daughter, Olga, returning to Czechoslovakia from exile in the United States.

- Christmas Uprising – Montenegrin nationalists known as the Greens led by Krsto Popović and Jovan Plamenac began to rebel against the Podgorica Assembly of Yugoslavia in response for what they perceived to be a forced merging with Serbia, Croatia, and Slovenia.
- Armeno-Georgian War – Armenian forces began a full attack on Sadakhlo but were repulsed at a heavy cost for the defenders.
- Tomáš Masaryk returned to Czechoslovakia after years in exile in the United States to formally accept the position of the first president of the newly formed nation.
- The name "Canadian National Railways" was authorized for use to refer to the collection of railway companies that formed Canada's national rail system.
- The Kalev Infantry Battalion was established in Tallinn to fight during the Estonian War of Independence.
- Born: Joseph Payne Brennan, American poet and fantasy writer, known for such works including the anthology Nine Horrors and a Dream and Sixty Selected Poems; in Bridgeport, Connecticut (d. 1990)
- Died:
  - Ali bin Hamud of Zanzibar, 34, Omani noble, 8th Sultan of Zanzibar (b. 1884)
  - Silk O'Loughlin, 46, American baseball umpire, officiated five out of the eleven World Series from 1906 to 1917; died of influenza (b. 1872)

== December 21, 1918 (Saturday) ==
- Russian Civil War – The anti-Bolshevik Siberian Army under command of Anatoly Pepelyayev captured Kungur, Russia as part of the Perm Operation on the Northwest Front.
- Armeno-Georgian War – Armenia forces captured Sadakhlo, forcing Varden Tsulukidze to step down as commander of the Georgian forces in Borchaly Uyezd, Georgia and be replaced by Abel Makashvili. The same day, a Georgian force led by Valiko Jugheli attacked Katharinenfeld and captured it along with critical guns and equipment lost in earlier attacks, marking a turning point in the conflict.
- The National Library of Estonia was established.
- The Scouts Battalion was established in Viljandi, Estonia to combat the Red Army.
- The rail line food service Norsk Spisevognselskap was established in Oslo to provide rail car restaurant service for the Norwegian Trunk Railway.
- Born:
  - Donald Regan, American public servant, 66th United States Secretary of the Treasury and 11th White House Chief of Staff; in Cambridge, Massachusetts (d. 2003)
  - Kurt Waldheim, Austrian state leader, 9th President of Austria and fourth Secretary-General of the United Nations; in Sankt Andrä-Wördern, Austria (d. 2007)
- Died:
  - Prince Konrad, 55, Austrian state leader, 20th Minister-President of Austria (b. 1863)
  - Walter Hines Page, 63, American diplomat, U.S. Ambassador to the United Kingdom from 1913 to 1918 (b. 1855)
  - Hobey Baker, 26, American football and hockey player, quarterback for the Princeton Tigers football team and right wing for the Princeton Tigers men's ice hockey team from 1906 to 1916, recipient of the Croix de guerre for action with the 13th Aero Squadron in World War I; killed in a plane crash (b. 1892)

== December 22, 1918 (Sunday) ==
- Christmas Uprising – Green leader Krsto Popović wrote up a series of requests to be delivered to the Podgorica Assembly including the termination of many of its resolutions in support of Yugoslavia.
- The silent war film The Heart of Humanity was released through Universal Pictures, with Erich von Stroheim as a villainous German army officer.
- Died: Charles Edward Perugini, 79, Italian-born British painter, known for works including A Girl Reading and A Summer Shower (b. 1839)

== December 23, 1918 (Monday) ==
- Christmas Uprising – Serbian militia put down a small uprising in Rijeka Crnojevića and Nikšić, Montenegro.
- Estonian War of Independence – Colonel Johan Laidoner was appointed commander-in-chief of the Estonian armed forces, which included 600 officers and 11,000 volunteers.
- The Kuperjanov Infantry Battalion was established under command of Estonian war hero Julius Kuperjanov during the Estonian War of Independence.
- The Belarusian Telegraph Agency was established as the official news agency of Belarus.
- The football club Hercílio Luz was established in Tubarão, Brazil.
- Born:
  - Henry W. Sawyer, American lawyer and activist, best known for his civil liberties cases Abington School District v. Schempp and Lemon v. Kurtzman; in Philadelphia (d. 1999)
  - Helmut Schmidt, German state leader, 5th Chancellor of Germany; in Hamburg (d. 2015)
- Died: Thérèse Schwartze, 67, Dutch painter, known for her portrait work including Queen Wilhelmina (b. 1851)

== December 24, 1918 (Tuesday) ==
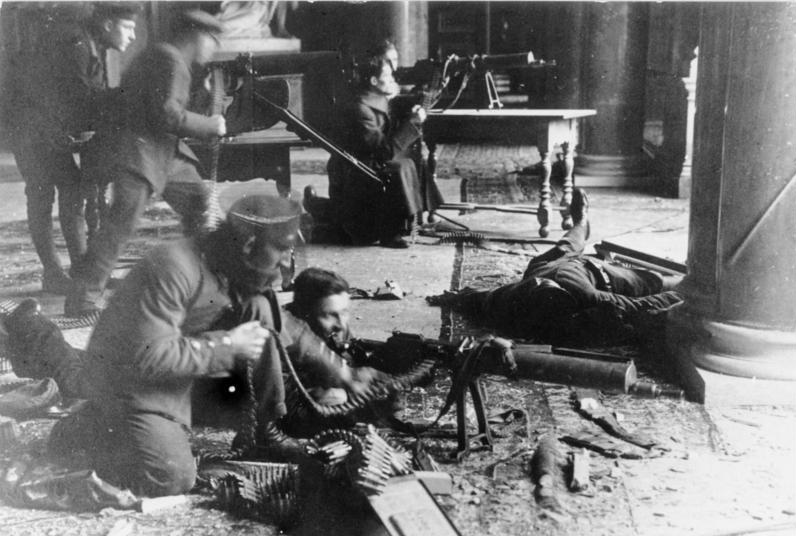
Paramilitary troops fire a machine gun during an uprising in Berlin.

- Russian Civil War – The Siberian Army captured Perm, Russia, with the Red Army losing 18,000 casualties.
- Estonian War of Independence – The Latvian Riflemen captured Tartu and Tapa, Estonia.
- Christmas Uprising – A force of 250 Serbian troops and local Montenegrin volunteer militia fought an estimated 1,500 to 2,000 Green rebels at Cetinje, Montenegro.
- Christmas crisis – German Army troops and members of the revolutionary paramilitary Volksmarinedivision fought outside the City Palace in Berlin, resulting in 70 deaths and leading to the larger scale Spartacist uprising in January.
- The Romanian Army entered Kolozsvár, the capital city of Transylvania.
- The British government endorsed a plan to form a League of Nations.
- The first Festival of Nine Lessons and Carols was held at King's College in Cambridge.
- Born: Dave Bartholomew, American R&B composer, best known for his collaborations with Fats Domino including "Ain't That a Shame"; in Edgard, Louisiana (d. 2019)
- Died: B. O. Flower, 60, American journalist, editor of news magazine The Arena (b. 1858)

== December 25, 1918 (Wednesday) ==
- The Congress of Durrës was held in the capital of the Principality of Albania with Mehmed Konica as chairman. The goal of congress was to establish an Albanian government the following year with ties to Italy.
- The Norwegian airline Det Norske Luftfartsrederi was established.
- Born:
  - Anwar Sadat, Egyptian state leader, third President of Egypt, recipient of the Nobel Peace Prize for brokering a peace treaty with Israel; in Monufia Governorate, Egypt (d. 1981, assassinated)
  - Henry Hillman, American business leader and philanthropist, chairman of The Hillman Company and the Hillman Family Foundations; in Pittsburgh (d. 2017)
  - Bertie Mee, English football player and manager, winger for the Derby and Mansfield from 1938 to 1939, manager of the Aresenal from 1966 to 1976; in Bulwell, England (d. 2001)
- Died: Daniel Webster Jones, 79, American politician, 19th Governor of Arkansas (b. 1839)

== December 26, 1918 (Thursday) ==
- Armeno-Georgian War – Georgian forces began counter offensive against the Armenians at Shulaveri, Georgia.
- The Royal Navy captured Russian destroyers Avtroil and Spartak in the port of Tallinn, Estonia during the British campaign in the Baltic. Russian naval officer Fyodor Raskolnikov, commander of the Spartak was later exchanged for 17 British prisoners of war in May. However, 40 other sailors were not as lucky, and were executed by the Estonian government on Naissaar in February despite protests from the United Kingdom.
- Born: Arthur W. Murray, American air force officer and test pilot, flew the Bell X-1 and Bell X-5 jet craft prototypes, recipient of the Distinguished Flying Cross and Air Medal; in Cresson, Pennsylvania (d. 2011)

== December 27, 1918 (Friday) ==
- Greater Poland Uprising – Poles in Greater Poland (the former Grand Duchy of Posen) rose up against the Germans, ignited by a patriotic speech made in Poznań by pianist and politician Ignacy Jan Paderewski.

== December 28, 1918 (Saturday) ==
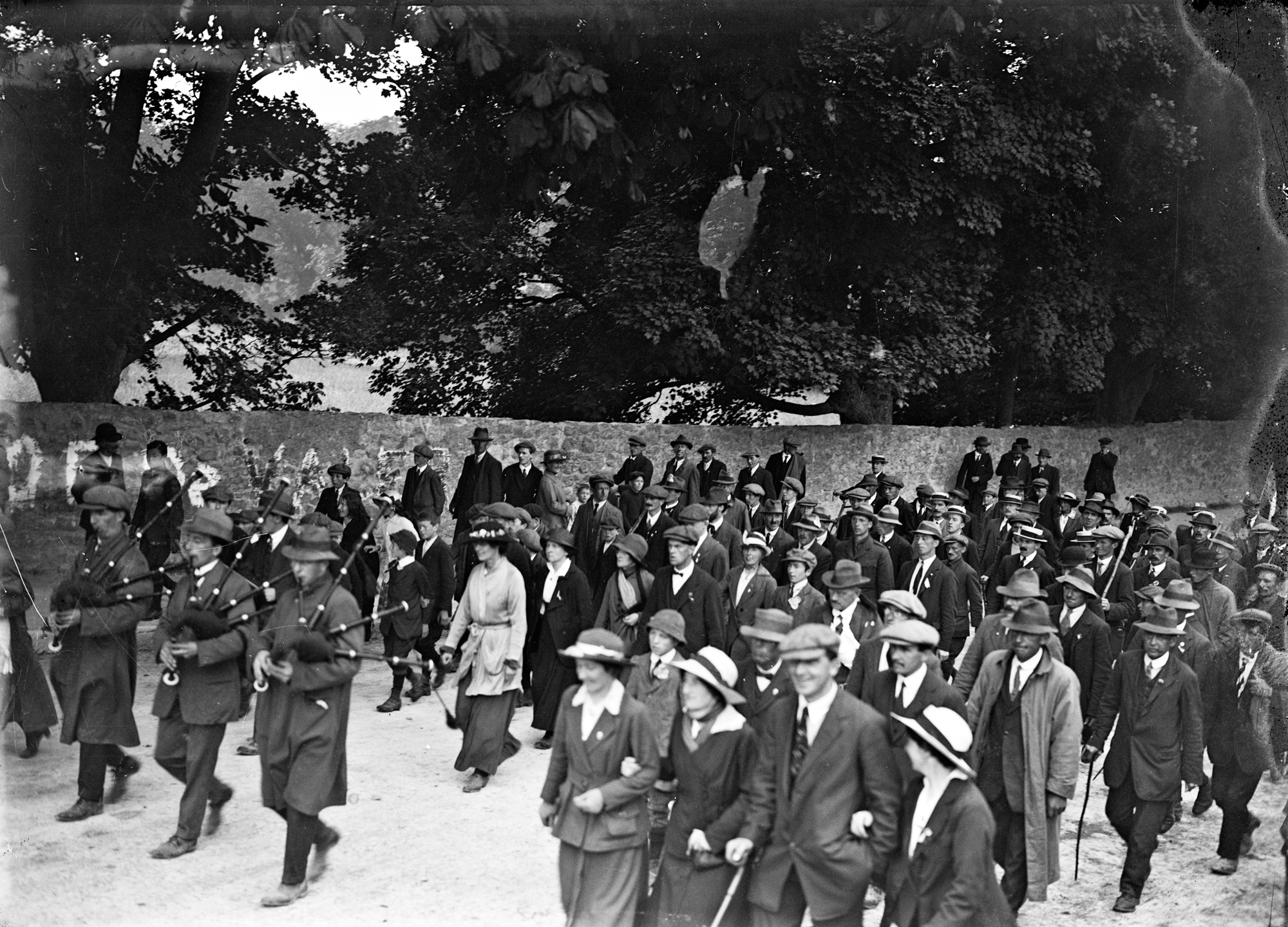
Constance Markievicz, first woman elected to the British House of Commons, leads an election victory procession in County Clare, Ireland.

- The David Lloyd George administration was re-elected in the British general election. Sinn Féin won 73 of the 105 seats in Ireland. In accordance with their manifesto, Sinn Féin members did not take their seats in the Palace of Westminster but formed the First Dáil in Dublin. Countess Constance Markievicz, while detained in Holloway Prison in London, became the first woman elected to (but could not take her seat in) the British House of Commons.
- Armeno-Georgian War – Georgian forces recaptured Shulaveri, Georgia from the Armenians.
- U.S. Navy cargo ship USS Tenadores ran aground off the coast of France.
- The Ukrainian Orthodox Church of Canada was established in Saskatoon.
- Khải Định, Emperor of Vietnam declared the traditional Chữ Nôm script for writing the Vietnamese language to be abolished in favor of the Latin script for the Vietnamese alphabet.
- Died:
  - Olavo Bilac, 53, Brazilian poet, 15th chair of the Brazilian Academy of Letters (b. 1865)
  - George Henry White, 66, American politician, U.S. Representative from North Carolina from 1897 to 1901 (b. 1852)

== December 29, 1918 (Sunday) ==
- The first edition of Sunday Express newspaper was published.

== December 30, 1918 (Monday) ==
- Armeno-Georgian War – Georgian forces recaptured Sadakhlo, Georgia from the Armenians.
- German anti-war activist Rosa Luxemburg led an effort to rename the left-leaning Spartacus League to the Communist Party of Germany.
- The Communist Party of Byelorussia was established in Belarus.
- The football club Paysandú was established in Brusque, Santa Catarina, Brazil. It merged with Carlos Renaux in 1987 to form Brusque.
- Born:
  - Al Purdy, Canadian poet, known for award-winning poetry collections The Cariboo Horses, The Collected Poems of Al Purdy and Rooms for Rent in the Outer Planets, recipient of the Order of Canada; in Wooler, Ontario (d. 2000)
  - W. Eugene Smith, American photographer, noted for his photo essays with Life magazine; in Wichita, Kansas (d. 1978)

== December 31, 1918 (Tuesday) ==
- A British-brokered ceasefire ended the two weeks of fighting in the Armeno-Georgian War.
- Polish forces capture Vilnius from the retreating German army (Battles for Vilnius (1918–1919))
- The Red Army entered Smolensk, Belarus and dissolved the Belarusian Democratic Republic.
- Estonian War of Independence – A Royal Navy squadron commanded by Rear Admiral Edwyn Alexander-Sinclair arrived at Tallinn, Estonia and delivered 6,500 rifles, 200 machine guns, and two field guns to the Estonian armed forces, as well as capturing two Russian destroyers and turning them over to the Estonian Navy.
- With the Bolshevik forces occupying Lithuania, the country's daily newspaper Echo of Lithuania was forced to shut down. It would be revived again in 1928.
- The Dutch newspaper The Belgian Daily ceased publication in The Hague.
- The Municipality of Jerilderie and Wunnamurra Shire merged to become Jerilderie Shire in New South Wales, Australia.
- Born:
  - Griffin Bell, American lawyer, 72nd United States Attorney General; in Americus, Georgia (d. 2009)
  - Al Lakeman, American baseball player, catcher for the Cincinnati Reds, Philadelphia Phillies, Boston Braves, and Detroit Tigers from 1942 to 1954; in Cincinnati (d. 1976)
  - Joachim Müncheberg, German air force officer, commander of Jagdgeschwader 26 and 77 for the Luftwaffe during World War II, recipient of the Knight's Cross of the Iron Cross; in Friedrichsdorf, Germany (now part of Poland) (d. 1943)
- Died: Leefe Robinson, 23, British air force officer, commander of the No. 39 and No. 40 Squadrons, recipient of the Victoria Cross for being the first pilot to shoot down a German airship in World War I; died of influenza (b. 1895)
