= List of people from Gaithersburg, Maryland =

This is a list of people who were born in, lived in, or are closely associated with the city of Gaithersburg, Maryland.

== Athletics ==
- Lawson Aschenbach, NASCAR driver
- Justin Carter (born 1987), basketball player for Maccabi Kiryat Gat of the Israeli Premier League
- Chris Coghlan, Major League Baseball player
- Dominique Dawes, three-time women's Olympic gymnastics team member, member of the Magnificent Seven
- Stefon Diggs, football player for the New England Patriots
- Trevon Diggs, football player for the Dallas Cowboys
- Hank Fraley, former football player in the NFL
- Jake Funk, football player for the Los Angeles Rams and Super Bowl LVI champion
- Dwayne Haskins, NFL quarterback for the Pittsburgh Steelers
- Courtney Kupets, 2004 Olympic gymnast and three-time NCAA champion
- Charles Lee, Charlotte Hornets head coach
- Malcolm Miller, basketball player and NBA champion for the Toronto Raptors
- John Papuchis, college football coach
- Guy Prather, football player
- Paul Rabil, lacrosse player (midfield), four-time All-American at Johns Hopkins University
- Chop Robinson, defensive end for the Miami Dolphins
- James White, basketball player who played for the San Antonio Spurs and Houston Rockets

== Arts & entertainment ==
- 6ix, record producer
- Utkarsh Ambudkar, actor, rapper
- Kimberly J. Brown, actress who starred in Halloweentown
- Mark Bryan, lead guitarist of Hootie & the Blowfish
- Jared E. Bush, filmmaker, director, CCO of Disney
- Isabel McNeill Carley, writer, music teacher, lived in Gaithersburg from 2004 until her death in 2011
- Kiran Chetry, CNN anchor
- Jeanine Cummins, author
- Brandon Victor Dixon, actor, singer and theatrical producer
- Astrid Ellena, Miss Indonesia 2011
- Judah Friedlander, actor, most notably from the television show 30 Rock
- Joshua Harris, author and former Christian pastor
- Matt Holt, former singer of Nothingface and Kingdom of Snakes
- Paul James, actor, most notably from the television show Greek
- Kelela, R&B singer
- Tim Kurkjian, ESPN baseball analyst, appears on SportsCenter and Baseball Tonight
- Matthew Lesko, author of Free Money books
- Logic (Robert Bryson Hall II), hip hop musician, rapper, musical engineer
- Lucas and Marcus, dancers and YouTube personalities
- Shane McMahon, WWE wrestler and commissioner of WWE SmackDown Live
- Jim Miklaszewski, chief Pentagon correspondent for NBC News
- Nick Mullen, comedian
- Eddie Stubbs, country musician, disc jockey, and Grand Ole Opry announcer
- Jodie Turner-Smith, actress and model
- Wale, hip hop musician and rapper

== Military, politics, & public service ==
- Georges C. Benjamin, former secretary of the Maryland Department of Health and Mental Hygiene
- Andrew Platt, former Maryland House of Delegates member
- David P. Weber, former assistant inspector general for the U.S. Securities and Exchange Commission

== Other ==
- Sankar Adhya, member of the National Academy of Sciences
- Jessica Watkins, NASA astronaut
- Frederick Yeh, biologist and animal welfare activist
