= Ventspils Gymnasium No.1 =

School in Ventspils, Latvia

Coordinates: 57°23′42″N 21°34′19″E

Ventspils State Gymnasium No.1
- Ventspils Valsts 1. ģimnāzija
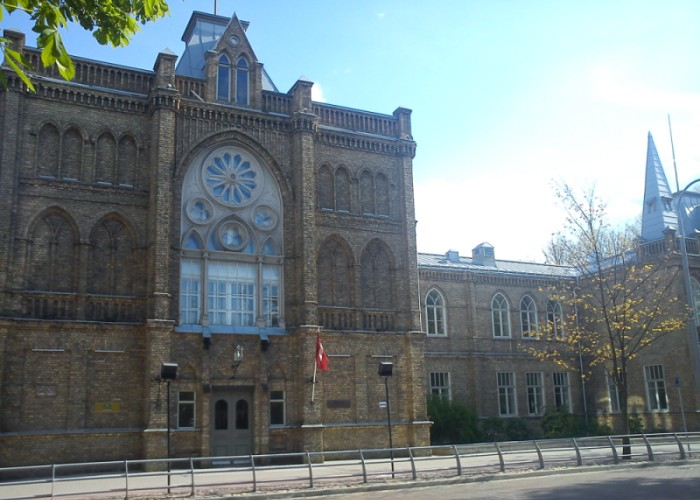

Location
- Kuldīgas 1 Ventspils LV-3601; Latvia

Information
- School type: Public secondary
- Established: 9 December 1918
- Founder: Teodors Grīnbergs
- Head teacher: Ieva Jurova
- Grades: 7–12
- National ranking: 14
- Website: http://gym.ventspils.lv/gym1/

Ventspils State Gymnasium No.1 (Latvian: Ventspils Valsts 1. ģimnāzija) is a secondary school located in Ventspils, Latvia.

== History ==
Ventspils Gymnasium No.1 was founded in December 9, 1918, thus being the first secondary school founded in independent Latvia. Over the years its name has been changed many times mostly because of the regime change in the country, for example, when Latvia was a part of the USSR it was named after Janis Fabricius, a military commander of the Red Army. In 1996 it received status of Gymnasium, meaning that it provides advanced secondary education.

== Renovation ==
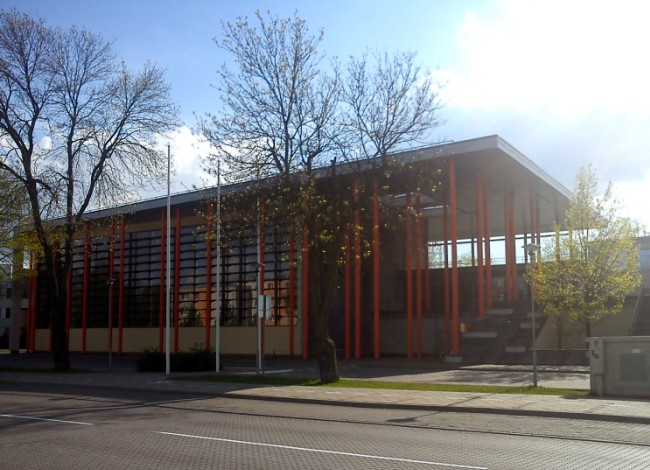
The new sports hall

Since 2004 the school's building has been experiencing a lot of improvements. The Government of Latvia and Ventspils City Council invested more than one million euro to build a new sports hall, proving a new place for students to do sports. Subsequently, communication technology and natural science equipment was installed to accommodate the needs of increasing numbers of young graduates deciding to study IT and natural sciences in universities. For example, among graduates in 2012 almost 40% decided to pursue studies in one of these subjects.

== Notable people ==
=== Head Teachers ===
- Teodors Grīnbergs (1918 - 1932)
- Atis Jaunzemis (1932 - 1939)
- Jānis Gulbis (1939 - 1941)
- Herberts Vikmanis (during the occupation of Nazi Germany)
- Jānis Miza (1945 - 1949)
- Elfrīda Grīnberga (1949 - 1950)
- Rita Ceikele (1951 - 1962)
- Alberts Pukjans (1962 - 1967)
- Jāzeps Marnauza (1967 - 1969)
- Voldemārs Kalniņš (1969 - 1975)
- Inese Vītola (1975 - 1988)
- Maruta Koha (1989 - 1994)
- Pārsla Kopmane (1994 - 2023)
- Ieva Jurova (2023)

=== Alumni ===
- Ģirts Valdis Kristovskis (b. 1962), politician
- Ēriks Rags (b. 1975), javelin thrower
- Ansis Brūns (b. 1976), javelin thrower
- Gatis Gūts (b. 1976), former Latvian bobsleigh pilot
- Jānis Geste (b. 1983), journalist
- Lauma Grīva (b. 1984), athlete
- Jānis Strēlnieks (b. 1989), basketball player
