= Belgisch Dagblad =

Defunct newspaper in the Netherlands

Het Belgisch Dagblad ('The Belgian Daily') was a Dutch-language daily newspaper published in The Hague, Netherlands, from 1915 to 1918. Het Belgisch Dagblad was the organ of the Flemish Patriotic League, an organization of Flemish residents in the Netherlands who defended the notion of a unitary Belgian state. The newspaper repeatedly declared its loyalty to the government in Le Havre.

== History ==
The first issue was published on 15 September 1915. Initially the newspaper was run by Modeste Terwagne, but Léonce du Castillon later took over the helm. The last issue of Het Belgisch Dagblad was published on 31 December 1918.
