= Melrose Symphony Orchestra =

American all-volunteer orchestra

The Melrose Symphony Orchestra (MSO) is the oldest continuing all-volunteer orchestra in the United States of America. Based at Memorial Hall in Melrose, Massachusetts, the orchestra has performed in recent years a Fall and Winter classical concert, as well as a Holiday and May Pops. Several musicians and performers have also played with the orchestra as soloists, including Gary Burton and Boris Goldovsky. Players include adults from all over Massachusetts, as well as a few gifted student musicians from local schools. Currently, the orchestra is conducted by Yoichi Udagawa and the general manager of the orchestra is Jessi Eisdorfer.

== History ==
In 1918, a group of citizens, led by Frank B. Gray and Harold A. Sewall, founded the orchestra. Mr. Elmer Wilson was asked to be the first conductor of the orchestra. The first rehearsal of the orchestra was held at a local YMCA with just thirteen musicians, but on December 10, 1918, the MSO held its first concert with forty-five players performing. Since then, seven conductors have followed Wilson, including Udagawa. On January 8, 1919, the Melrose Orchestra Association was incorporated with Mr. Victor Friend as its president. Since then, ten presidents have succeeded Mr. Friend. They have helped to both organize concerts and continually find ways to make the orchestral experience even more enjoyable for concert goers. Former president Millie Rich in particular is credited with leading the orchestra through "an incredible period of growth and success." Today, the orchestra routinely plays to sold out audiences and has also released two CDs.

== Scholarship Program ==
To benefit the student musicians, the orchestra has a scholarship program. A fund was started by the Melrose Orchestral Association in order to give financial assistance to a student player that participates in all four performances in a season and plans to study music in college. Music awards are also given to graduating high school seniors and college students that play throughout the season.
