= José Júlio da Costa =

Portuguese left-wing political activist who assassinated President Sidónio Pais

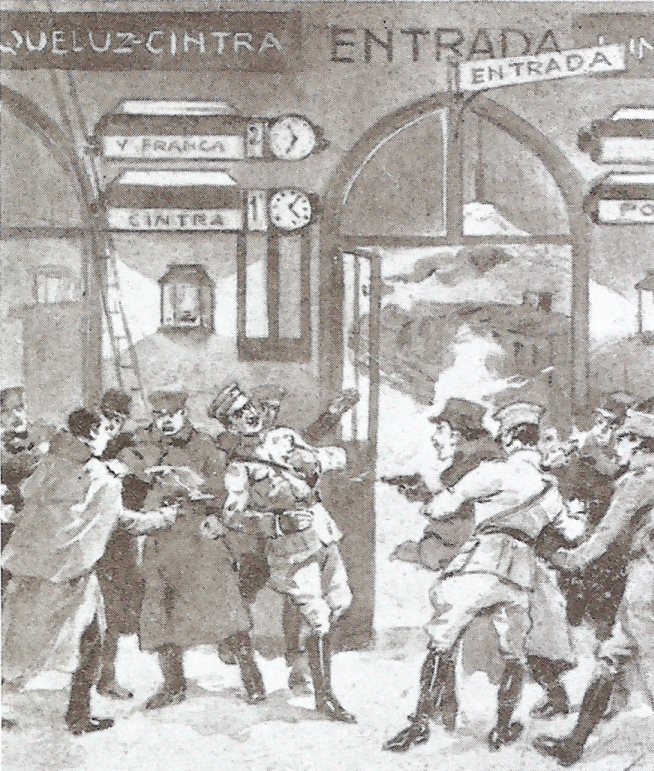
- Assassination of Sidónio Pais
- Born: José Júlio da Costa; 14 October 1893; Garvão, Portugal
- Died: 16 March 1946 (aged 52); Lisbon, Portugal
- Occupation: Staff Sergeant in the Portuguese Army (until 1916)
- Spouse: Maria do Rosário Pereira Costa
- Parent(s): Eduardo Brito Júlio and Maria Gertrudes da Costa Júlio
- Conviction: Assassination of Sidónio Pais
- Penalty: Lifetime imprisonment

José Júlio da Costa (14 October 1893, Garvão – 16 March 1946, Lisbon) was a Portuguese left-wing political activist who assassinated President Sidónio Pais of Portugal on 14 December 1918.

== Early life ==
José Júlio da Costa was the second of seven children of Eduardo Brito Júlio and Maria Gertrudes Júlio. He grew up in a family of landowners that was considered wealthy. At the time of his arrest, he was married to Maria do Rosário Costa Pereira but had no children.

=== Military service ===
On 21 May 1910, at the age of 16, José enlisted as a volunteer in the Portuguese Army. He participated in the military uprising that led to the proclamation of the Portuguese Republic on 5 October 1910. He was later placed in the Portuguese colonial army in which took part in actions in Portuguese Timor, Mozambique and Angola. When World war I started in 1914, José tried to enlist as a volunteer to fight in but was refused.

On 11 April 1916, after six years in service, José left the army with the rank of staff sergeant and returned to his homeland.

=== President Pais ===
When President Sidónio Pais was elected president in April 1918, José became angry with the government. Being a left-wing political activist, José believed that Pais ruled the country like a dictator. In a few interviews that José gave before his death, he said that he was discontent with Pais's policies and even accused him of betraying the ideals of the Portuguese Republican Revolution of 1910 and adapting from Germany, alongside the monarchists and clergy, who were the enemies of the Republic.

José also wanted revenge on Pais because he had abandoned the Portuguese Expeditionary Corps, which had fought in Flanders and France during World War I. Jose was also angry about the outcome of a failed strike by farm workers of Vale de Santiago in which he had acted as a negotiator between the authorities and the rebels, and the agreement that he made with the authorities was repealed, and the workers were severely punished by a number of strikers being deported to Portuguese Africa. After the incident, José felt betrayed by the lack of trust from the authorities. He became radicalized and vowed to avenge his countrymen and fellow soldiers by assassinating the one he felt was the cause of all their problems, President, or, as he called him, President-King Pais.

According to José, he was willing to become a martyr and to die for his republic. He was fully aware that might lead to civil strife later. In this, José was almost prophetic- the Ditatura Militar dictatorship took power only eight years after Sidónio Pais' death.

== Assassination ==
José carefully prepared the assassination of Pais, as a letter written by himself on 12 December indicates. He waited for the President to arrive at the Rossio Station in Lisbon on 14 December 1918. The President arrived in the station but was protected by a number of bodyguards after a previous assassination attempt on 6 December. That, however, could not save the President, who was preparing to embark on the first floor of the station. José drew his pistol which he concealed in his Alentejo cloak and fired two shots at the President.

Both shots hit Pais, who fell to the ground. A panic erupted in the station, but José made no attempt to escape and was arrested moments after he had fired and had been brutally beaten by the crowd. The President was still alive and rushed to a hospital, but the second shot, which had hit him in the stomach, proved to be fatal, and he died shortly before midnight on 14 December 1918.

== Aftermath ==
José was imprisoned and tortured by the government. José's mother and wife were arrested and held in the dungeons of the civil government before they were finally released.

José never stood trial for his actions and was locked away for 28 years in a psychiatric hospital in Lisbon in which he was forgotten by the government and fell into obscurity. José died in the hospital on 16 March 1946, at the age of 52.
