= Joachim Müncheberg =

German fighter pilot (1918–1943)

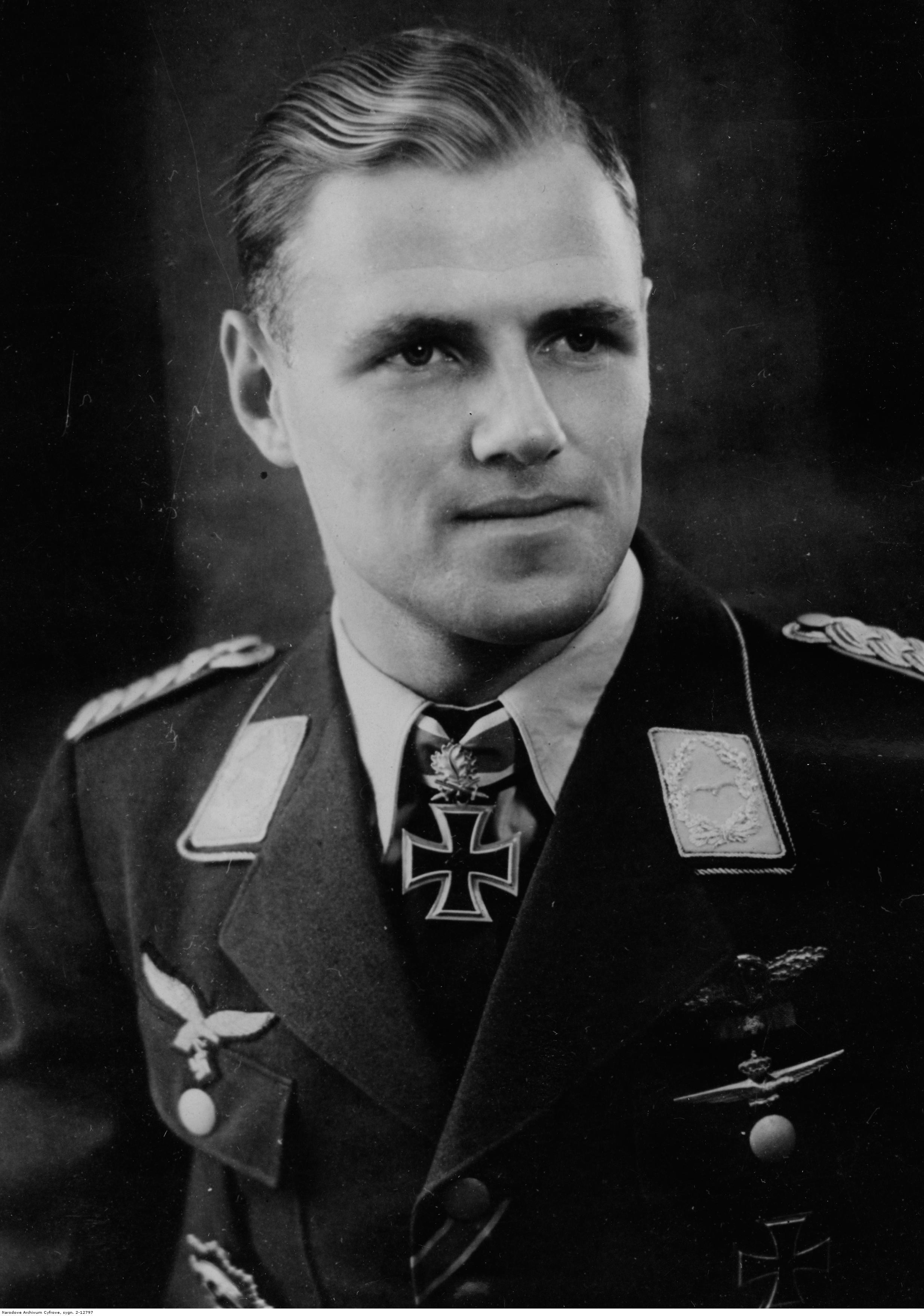
- Born: 31 December 1918; Friedrichsdorf, Kreis Dramburg, Province of Pomerania, Prussia, Germany
- Died: 23 March 1943 (aged 24); Meknassy, French Tunisia
- Cause of death: Killed in action
- Burial place: German Military Cemetery at Bordj-Cedria
- Military career
- Allegiance: Nazi Germany
- Branch: German Army (1936–1938); Luftwaffe (1938–1943)
- Service years: 1936–1943
- Rank: Major (major)
- Units: JG 26, JG 51, JG 77
- Commands: 7./JG 26, II./JG 26, JG 77
- Conflicts: World War II: Battle of Belgium; Battle of France; Battle of Britain; Siege of Malta; Axis invasion of Yugoslavia; Eastern Front; Mediterranean Theatre †
- Awards: Knight's Cross of the Iron Cross with Oak Leaves and Swords; Gold Medal of Military Valor

Joachim Müncheberg (31 December 1918 – 23 March 1943) was a German Luftwaffe fighter pilot during World War II and an ace credited with 135 air victories. The majority of his victories were claimed over the Western Front, with 33 claims over the Eastern Front. Of his 102 aerial victories achieved over the Western Allies, 46 were against Supermarine Spitfire fighters.

Born in Friedrichsdorf, Prussia (now in Poland), Müncheberg volunteered for military service in the Wehrmacht of Nazi Germany in 1936. Initially serving in the Army, he transferred to the Luftwaffe (air force) in 1938. Following flight training, he was posted to Jagdgeschwader 234 (JG 234—234th Fighter Wing) in October 1938. He was transferred to Jagdgeschwader 26 "Schlageter" (JG 26—26th Fighter Wing) a year later and was appointed adjutant of the III. Gruppe (3rd Group). He fought in the Battle of France and received the Knight's Cross of the Iron Cross following his 20th aerial victory and during the Battle of Britain. Serving as a Staffelkapitän (Squadron Leader) he fought in the aerial battles during the siege of Malta and invasion of Yugoslavia. He received the Knight's Cross of the Iron Cross with Oak Leaves and Italian Gold Medal of Military Valor after 43 aerial victories.

Müncheberg then briefly served in North Africa in support of the Afrika Korps before transferring to France. He was given command of JG 26's II. Gruppe (2nd Group) in September 1941 and was then posted to Jagdgeschwader 51 (JG 51 —51st Fighter Wing), on the Eastern Front, in July 1942. Serving as a Geschwaderkommodore (Wing Commander) in training under JG 51 wing commander Karl-Gottfried Nordmann, he claimed his 100th aerial victory on 5 September 1942 for which he was awarded the Knight's Cross of the Iron Cross with Oak Leaves and Swords on 9 September 1942, his score then at 103 aerial victories. On 1 October 1942 Müncheberg was given command of Jagdgeschwader 77 (JG 77—77th Fighter Wing), operating in the Mediterranean Theatre. He died in a mid-air collision with an enemy aircraft in Meknassy, Tunisia on 23 March 1943.

== Childhood, education and early career ==
Joachim "Jochen" Müncheberg was born on 31 December 1918 in Friedrichsdorf near Dramburg in the Province of Pomerania, at the time a province of the Free State of Prussia. Today it is Darskowo in the administrative district of Gmina Złocieniec, within Drawsko County, Poland. He was the second child of Paul Müncheberg, a farmer, and his wife Erika, née Ulrich. His sister Eva-Brigitte was one and a half years older. His father had served as a cavalry officer of the reserves during World War I. The hyperinflation in the Weimar Republic forced his father to sell their farm Friedrichshof in 1923; they resettled in Königsberg, where Müncheberg started his elementary schooling (Grundschule). His father was able to repurchase their old farm in 1927 and the family moved back to Friedrichshof. Müncheberg completed his elementary school in Falkenburg, Pomerania. He walked or rode on a horse-drawn wagon 24 kilometres (15 mi) each way to school. In 1928, he transferred to the Realgymnasium (a type of secondary school) in Dramburg and graduated with his Abitur (diploma) in 1936.

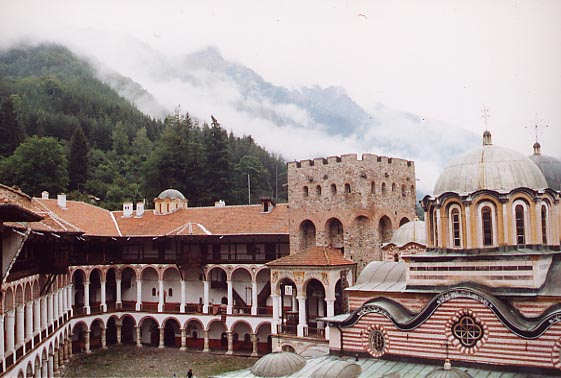
Rila Monastery

Müncheberg, who was talented in sports and athletics, played football for the T.V. Falkenburg youth team in the early 1930s. He attended the Sturmabteilung-sports school in Hammerstein for a few weeks in 1934 and in 1935, spent his summer vacation in Bulgaria where he, among other places, stayed at the Rila Monastery. In early 1936, he attended a National Socialism course in Lauenburg, Pomerania. He completed his compulsory labour service (Reichsarbeitsdienst) in October 1936 with Abteilung (department) 5/50 in Lüttmannshagen, district of Cammin. As an athlete, he especially excelled in the decathlon; almost daily he practised the ten different disciplines. Aged 17, he attended a summer camp held in conjunction with the 1936 Summer Olympics in Berlin.

His interest in flying was kindled by his cousin Hermann Hackbusch, a pilot during World War I, who often took Müncheberg to the Berlin-Staaken airfield for sightseeing flights. Müncheberg volunteered for service in the then newly emerging Luftwaffe and started his recruit training on 4 December 1936 in the Army of the Wehrmacht. Müncheberg spent his 1936/37 winter vacation in Altenberg in the Ore Mountains. He then attended the III. Lehrgang (3rd training course) in the 4. Schülerkompanie (4th student company) at the Luftkriegsschule 1 (1st Air War School) in Dresden as a Fahnenjunker (Officer Applicant) from 1 April to 30 June 1937. A year later, he completed his flight training there and was promoted to Fähnrich (Officer Cadet) on 16 December 1937. (Note: Flight training in the Luftwaffe progressed through the levels A1, A2 and B1, B2, referred to as A/B flight training. The training included theoretical and practical training in aerobatics, navigation, long-distance flights and dead-stick landings. The B courses included high-altitude flights, instrument flights, night landings and training to handle the aircraft in difficult situations.) He transferred to the Luftwaffe in 1938 and attended the Jagdfliegerschule (Fighter Pilot School) in Werneuchen, under the command of Oberst (Colonel) Theodor Osterkamp. He was then posted to I. Gruppe (1st group) of Jagdgeschwader 234 (JG 234—234th Fighter Wing) stationed at Cologne on 23 September 1938. (Note: For an explanation of Luftwaffe unit designations, see Organisation of the Luftwaffe during World War II.) He was promoted to Leutnant (Second Lieutenant) on 8 November 1938.

While stationed in Cologne, Müncheberg trained for the decathlon at the ASV Köln (sports club in Cologne) during his spare time and competed in various national and international track and field events. He even had a training field built on the family estate at Friedrichshof in Pomerania and at the time had strong ambitions to compete in the 1940 Summer Olympics. His commanding officers supported him in this athletic vision and gave him additional time off to practice for the Olympics. Müncheberg owned a dachshund, which his mother had bred, named Seppl. The dog accompanied him from the start of World War II until his death on 23 March 1943.

At the time of Müncheberg's posting to JG 234, the Geschwader was commanded by Oberst Eduard Ritter von Schleich and I. Gruppe was headed by Major Gotthard Handrick. Initially equipped with the Messerschmitt Bf 109 D series, the Gruppe was based in Köln-Ostheim and was renamed on 1 November 1938 to I. Gruppe of Jagdgeschwader 132. In December, the Gruppe was equipped with the Bf 109 E-3. On 1 May 1939, the unit was again re-designated and became I. Gruppe of Jagdgeschwader 26 "Schlageter" (JG 26—26th Fighter Wing), named after Albert Leo Schlageter. Müncheberg was transferred to 11. Staffel of Lehrgeschwader 2 (11./LG 2—11th squadron of the 2nd Demonstration Wing) in mid-1939. This squadron was formed on 1 August 1939 and experimented with night fighting techniques. Only pilots with excellent flying abilities, especially blind flying, were chosen.

== World War II ==
World War II in Europe began on Friday 1 September 1939 when German forces invaded Poland. 11.(Nacht)/LG 2 was re-designated to 10.(Nachtjagd) Staffel of JG 26 which was led by Oberleutnant (First Lieutenant) Johannes Steinhoff. III. Gruppe was formed on 23 September 1939 in Werl and Müncheberg was appointed its adjutant. III. Gruppe relocated to Essen-Mülheim in early November 1939 during the Phoney War period (October 1939 – April 1940). From this airfield, he claimed his first victory on 7 November 1939, a Royal Air Force (RAF) Bristol Blenheim Mk. I bomber L1325 of No. 57 Squadron, piloted by Pilot Officer H.R. Bewlay. This achievement earned him the Iron Cross 2nd Class (Eisernes Kreuz zweiter Klasse) on 9 November 1939.

=== Battle of France ===
The Battle of France, the German invasion of France and the Low Countries, began on 10 May 1940. II. and III. Gruppe flew close air support missions in support of German airborne landings by the Fallschirmjäger (paratroopers) in the Netherlands. Müncheberg filed claim for his second victory on 11 May 1940 when he shot down an Armée de l'Air (French Air Force) Curtiss P-36 Hawk northwest of Antwerp. On 13 May 1940, III. Gruppe was moved to München Gladbach, present-day Mönchengladbach, closer to the border with the Netherlands and Belgium.

On 14 May, JG 26 escorted bombers of III. Gruppe of Lehrgeschwader 1 (LG 1—1st Demonstration Wing). En route, the bombers were attacked by No. 504 Squadron fighters. Four of them were claimed shot down, one by Müncheberg. The claims are confirmed by British records. Two pilots were wounded but Squadron Leader Parnall was killed. On 15 May Müncheberg claimed a Hurricane over Overijse, near Brussels as the Gruppe supported German forces in the Battle of Belgium. Sergeant Jim Williams, No. 3 Squadron was his opponent. Williams was killed when L1645 crashed near Overijse. After the surrender of the Netherlands on 17 May 1940, III. Gruppe moved to Peer in Belgium and again moved on 19 May, this time to Beauvechain near Brussels.

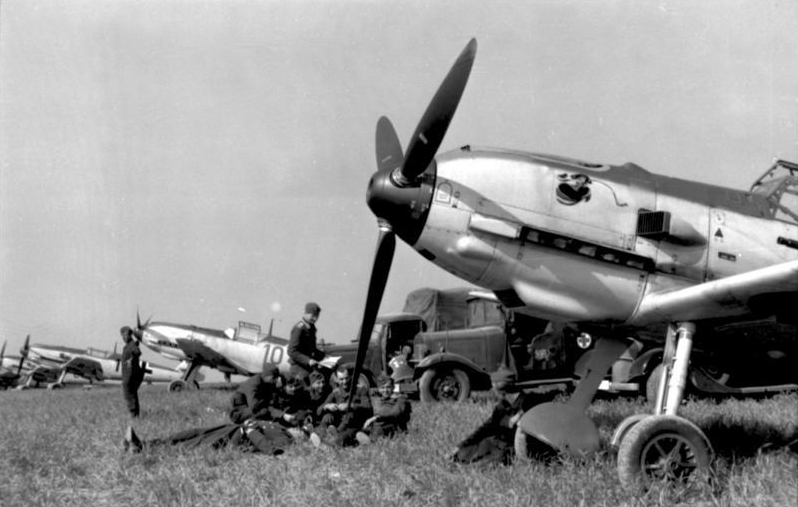
Bf 109 Es, similar to those flown by Müncheberg over France and Belgium.

Operating from Chièvres Air Base from 27 May 1940, Müncheberg claimed his fifth aerial victory over a Supermarine Spitfire on 29 May 1940. This achievement earned him the Iron Cross 1st Class (Eisernes Kreuz erster Klasse). At the time, III. Gruppe was providing fighter escort for Junkers Ju 87 "Stuka" dive bombers and Messerschmitt Bf 110 heavy fighters operating against the beachhead held by British Expeditionary Force (BEF) in the Battle of Dunkirk. Fighter Command recorded the loss of 10 fighters to Bf 109s on 29 May. On 31 May, Müncheberg claimed an unprecedented four Spitfires over Dunkirk, as the evacuation and the battle of the port reached a climax. The last claim of the day was made against No. 609 Squadron. No. 609 Squadron reported two pilots killed and one wounded, though one of the dead pilots was killed in action with Heinkel He 111 bombers according to British sources.

On 4 June 1940, III. Gruppe relocated to La Capelle near Boulogne. The second and decisive phase, Fall Rot (Case Red), of the Battle of France began on 5 June. Major (Major) Adolf Galland was appointed Gruppenkommandeur (group commander) of the III. Gruppe on 6 June and Müncheberg became his first adjutant. The Gruppe was again relocated on 13 June, this time to Les Thilliers-en-Vexin and on 17 June to Villacoublay near Paris. Müncheberg flew ground support missions against the retreating French forces at the time. France surrendered on 22 June 1940 and III. Gruppe of JG 26 "Schlageter" moved back to München Gladbach in Germany. In total, Müncheberg claimed eight Allied aircraft shot down during the invasion of France, including four on 31 May 1940, bringing his total to nine. The Gruppe then moved to Döberitz on 1 July to provide fighter protection for Berlin. The time was also used to repair and upgrade the Bf 109 E-3s to Bf 109 E-4s.

=== Battle of Britain ===
On 21 July 1940, III gruppe JG 26 "Schlageter" received orders to relocate to Caffiers in the Nord-Pas-de-Calais in preparation for actions against Britain in what would become the Battle of Britain. Adolf Hitler had issued Führer Directive no. 17 (Weisung Nr. 17) on 1 August 1940; the strategic objective was to engage and defeat the RAF to achieve air supremacy, or at least air superiority, in preparation for Operation Sea Lion (Unternehmen Seelöwe), the proposed amphibious invasion of Great Britain. III. Gruppe flew fighter protection for bomber formations attacking allied shipping in the English Channel on 24 July. These missions were referred to as Kanalkampf (channel combat) by the Germans. The unit flew its next mission one day later, providing fighter protection for Stukas again targeting shipping. Müncheberg, who had been promoted to Oberleutnant on 19 July 1940, claimed his 10th aerial victory on 28 July when he shot down a No. 257 Squadron Hawker Hurricane 15 kilometres (9.3 mi) northeast of Dover. The claim was made at 15:15. No other German pilot from JG 26 claimed a Hurricane at that time. The only loss suffered by No. 257 Squadron was Sergeant Ronald V. Forward who bailed out wounded. Müncheberg is credited with downing Forward. However, RAF records appear to show he was shot down at 18:40, almost three and a half hours after Müncheberg's claim.

Müncheberg was credited with his 11th victory on 8 August, claiming a No. 65 Squadron Spitfire piloted by Flight Sergeant Norman T. Phillips shot down. The claim would seem unlikely. The war diary for JG 26 "Schlageter" shows that Müncheberg made his claim at 12:55 in the afternoon as did three other pilots. No. 65 Squadron lost only two Spitfires that day, one flown by Phillips. British records show Phillips was killed in action at 10:45 in No. 65 Squadron's first mission of the morning, approximately two hours earlier. On this day, the Germans lost 22 aircraft shot down and 23 damaged; the British lost 16 aircraft shot down and four damaged. Only one III. Gruppe Bf 109 was lost. The only RAF losses occurring at the time of Müncheberg's claim were two Hurricanes belonging to No. 238 Squadron - Flight Lieutenant D.E Turner and Flying Officer D.C. McCaw were killed in action at roughly 12:30.

III. Gruppe continued to fly combat air patrols over the English Channel on 11 and 12 August, however, Müncheberg did not claim any aircraft shot down on these days. The fighting reached a climax on 13 August when Eagle Day was launched (code name Adlertag). Müncheberg claimed a Hurricane shot down from either No. 32 Squadron or No. 615. Squadron on 14 August. On 15 August he claimed a Spitfire at 16:01 CET near Dover while the gruppe flew as escort for Kampfgeschwader 1 Hindenburg (KG 1—1st Bomber Wing) and Kampfgeschwader 2 Holzhammer (KG 2—2nd Bomber Wing). The battles fought on this date became known as "Black Thursday" in the Luftwaffe after it sustained heavy casualties. The bombers broke through RAF defences, and fanned out. They attacked RAF Hawkinge, Maidstone, Dover, Rye and the radar station at Foreness. A pair of Spitfires from No. 64 Squadron were reported shot down near Dungeness at the same time. One pilot was killed, and the other was captured after force-landing near Calais. Galland was appointed Geschwaderkommodore (Wing Commander) of JG 26 "Schlageter" on 22 August 1940. In consequence, Hauptmann Gerhard Schöpfel, who had led 9. Staffel, was appointed Gruppenkomandeur of the III. Gruppe and Müncheberg was given command of the 7. Staffel as Staffelkapitän (Squadron Leader), replacing Oberleutnant Georg Beyer who left to become Galland's adjutant and became a prisoner of war on 28 August after being shot down. Müncheberg may have pressured Galland into awarding him the position.

Flying another fighter escort mission on 24 August in an attack south of London, Müncheberg claimed a victory over a Hurricane from No. 151 Squadron and another Hurricane on 31 August. This brought his total to 15 aerial victories, which increased to 16 the next day. On 13 September 1940, he was awarded the Knight's Cross of the Iron Cross (Ritterkreuz des Eisernen Kreuzes) the same day he achieved his 20th aerial victory - the third in JG 26. The No. 151 pilot was Pilot Officer F Czajkowski, who force-landed wounded. He returned in early October, after the third phase of the Battle of Britain where the Luftwaffe had targeted the British airfields, had come to an end. He claimed his first victory following his vacation on 17 October over a Free French Air Force Bloch MB.150. He shot down a Spitfire on 25 October. The weather then deteriorated, and fog and heavy rain prevented further flight operations and III. Gruppe had to abandon the airfield at Caffiers, relocating to Abbeville-Drucat on 10 November. He claimed his last victory in the Battle of Britain, and his last of 1940, on 14 November, when Galland and Müncheberg each claimed a Spitfire in combat with No. 66. Squadron and No. 74. Squadron. This was Müncheberg's 23rd victory, and was claimed southeast of Dover. Pilot Officer W Armstrong, No. 74 Squadron baled out. Pilot Officer W Rózycki survived a crash-landing but the Hurricane was written off. Hitler visited JG 26 "Schlageter" at Christmas 1940. Hitler dined with a selected group of pilots, among them Oberleutnant Gustav Sprick, Hauptmann Walter Adolph, Hauptmann Rolf Pingel, Galland, Schöpfel and Müncheberg. The war of attrition against the RAF had cost JG 26 "Schlageter" dearly, 7. Staffel alone lost 13 pilots, and the entire Geschwader had to be moved back to Germany to reform and re-equip in early 1941. III. Gruppe was stationed at Bonn-Hangelar, in Sankt Augustin. Before the Gruppe received new aircraft, the men were sent on a skiing vacation in the Austrian Alps. This was to be the last period of leave given to the entire JG 26 for the duration of the war.

=== Malta, Balkans and North Africa in 1941 ===
On 22 January 1941, Müncheberg was informed by Gruppenkommandeur Schöpfel that the 7. Staffel had to relocate to Sicily in support of X. Fliegerkorps, under the command of General der Flieger (General of the Flyers) Hans Geisler, for actions against the strategically important island of Malta. With the opening of a new front in North Africa in mid-1940, British air and sea forces based on the island could attack Axis ships transporting vital supplies and reinforcements from Europe to North Africa. To counter this threat the Luftwaffe and the Regia Aeronautica (Italian Royal Air Force) were tasked with bombing raids in an effort to neutralise the RAF defences and the ports. That day the unit and a 40-strong detachment of ground crews departed Wevelgem.

The red heart was displayed on both sides of the Bf 109 engine cowling, earning the unit the nickname "Red Hearts".

Following a brief stopover in Rome, 7. Staffel arrived in Gela on Sicily on 9 February 1941. Here Müncheberg received a factory new Bf 109 E-7/N with the Werknummer (factory number) 3826 and marked as "White 12". He claimed his first victory in the Siege of Malta on 12 February over a No. 261 Squadron Hurricane south of Siġġiewi, Malta. On 16 February Müncheberg claimed his 26th victory over No. 261 Squadron Hurricane of ace Flight Lieutenant James MacLachlan, who baled out severely wounded. MacLachlan lost his arm, but returned to combat in late 1941. Müncheberg claimed a slow-flying Hurricane—he assumed that the Hurricane had engine trouble—on 25 February. Flying fighter protection for the Stukas, which were targeting the airfield at Luqa, he claimed another Hurricane at 14:06 and another one the following day; the pilot baled out. The seven-victory ace Flying Officer Frederic Frank 'Eric' Taylor DFC was probably Müncheberg's victory. Taylor was declared missing in action but reported killed when his Mae West lifejacket washed ashore with a 20mm cannon shell hole in the chest area. Pilot Officers P Kearsey and C E Langdon were killed in the same battle. Müncheberg said of Taylor, "the fighting spirit of the British pilot was fantastic. He tried, although very badly hit, to still attack a Ju 88 [sic]." Müncheberg claimed his 33rd victory on 28 March 1941. This was also his 200th combat mission which was celebrated by the entire Staffel.

The 7. Staffel, and elements of the support ground personnel, were relocated to Grottaglie airfield near Taranto in Apulia on 5 April 1941. 7/JG 26 flew in support of the German invasion of Yugoslavia and Greece on 6 April. In support of this invasion, the pilots attacked the airfield at Podgorica. Müncheberg claimed a Yugoslav Hawker Fury biplane of Independent Fighter Eskadrila, 81 (Bomber) Grupa, Jugoslovensko Kraljevsko Ratno Vazduhoplovstvo (JKRV - Yugoslav Royal Air Force) on 6 April 1941. Its pilot Porucnik (First Lieutenant) Milenko Milivojevic was killed. He claimed another Fury and a Breguet 19 destroyed on the ground, but he was only given credit for the first aircraft destroyed in aerial combat. The two Furys were in fact Avia BH-33 biplanes.

The Balkan intermezzo was short and the detachment relocated back to Gela beginning on 8 April. On 28 March Müncheberg completed his 200th mission and claimed his 33rd victory, another Hurricane. Müncheberg claimed two Hurricanes of No. 261 Squadron, the first one on 11 April and the second one on 23 April: in the former case the two pilots were killed when they attacked a Bf 110 reconnaissance aircraft and failed to notice Müncheberg and his wingman flying as an escort; in the latter case the pilot survived the parachute jump but drowned. British naval forces were ordered not to undertake rescue missions in the midst of an air raid. A reconnaissance Bf 109 detected a four-engine Short Sunderland flying boat (L5807), belonging to No. 228 Squadron moored at RAF Kalafrana on 27 April. Müncheberg led his 7. Staffel in the attack, destroying the Sunderland. Pilot Officer Rees and his crew survived. On 29 April, 7. Staffel provided fighter protection for Junkers Ju 88 bombers attacking Malta. 7. Staffel claimed two Hurricanes shot down, one by Münchberg, for the loss of one Ju 88. The German actress and UFA star, Carola Höhn, wife of bomber pilot Arved Crüger, on a mission to provide entertainment to the troops, visited the pilots at Gela. According to Röll, Müncheberg was especially attracted to the actress and personally accompanied her during her visit.

Müncheberg surpassed 40 aerial victories on 1 May 1941 after downing two aircraft on an early morning mission and a third in the evening. This feat earned him his second mention in the Wehrmachtbericht. In the afternoon, 7. Staffel flew fighter cover for Italian Savoia-Marchetti SM.79 bombers. In aerial combat with six Hurricanes over the airfields at Hal Far and Luqa he shot down his third opponent of the day. In total, 7. Staffel was credited with six victories on this day, three by Müncheberg. Müncheberg was awarded the Knight's Cross of the Iron Cross with Oak Leaves (Ritterkreuz des Eisernen Kreuzes mit Eichenlaub), following two more Hurricanes shot down on 6 May. His total now at 43 victories, Müncheberg received the news of his award on the early morning of 7 May. Müncheberg became the 12th member of the Wehrmacht to be honoured with the Oak Leaves and two hours later received news that Duce Benito Mussolini had awarded him the Gold Medal of Military Valor (Medaglia d'oro al Valore Militare), the first German to receive this award. Hitler sent him a teleprinter message on 7 May 1941 congratulating him on his 40th aerial victory.

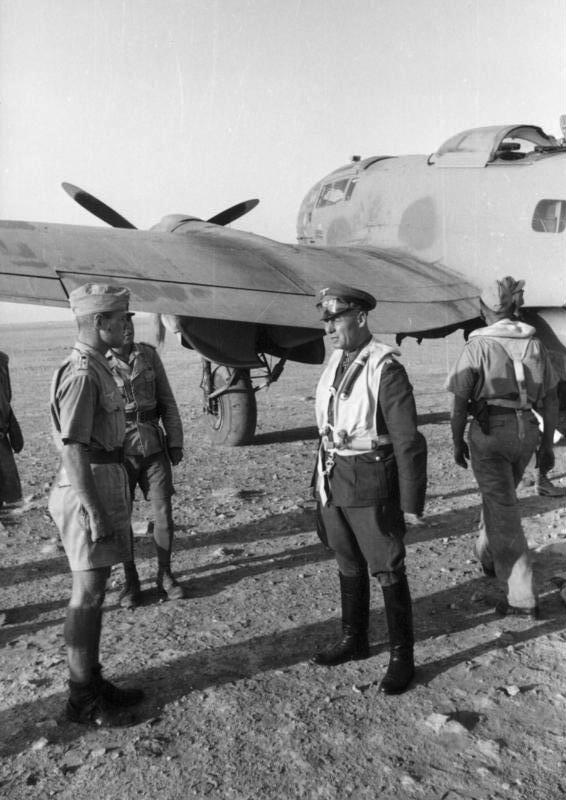
Müncheberg (left) and General (later field marshal) Erwin Rommel in North Africa, 1941. (Note: Hardly visible from this angle, the picture shows Müncheberg wearing a bandage on his left knee. He injured himself in a sporting competition at Erfurt in May 1941. He fell running the 110 metres hurdles.)

7. Staffel then began a series of relocations which eventually took them to the North African theatre of operations. The Staffel first relocated to Greece at the end of May. The ground personnel were shipped from Catania to Piraeus and then to the airfield at Molaoi on the southern tip of the Peloponnese region. The original intent was to participate in the Battle of Crete. The relatively quick but costly victory made these plans obsolete. The Staffel was then given two weeks of rest at Catania before moving on to Molaoi. Here the pilots were initially tasked with long-range combat air patrols before Operation Battleaxe, a British Army operation with the goal of clearing eastern Cyrenaica of German and Italian forces, was initiated on 15 June. 7. Staffel was immediately ordered to relocate to North Africa where they were subordinated to I. Gruppe of Jagdgeschwader 27 (I./JG 27 - 1st group of the 27th Fighter Wing), then under the command of Hauptmann Eduard Neumann. The unit was based at Gazala on 31 May.

Müncheberg claimed his first three victories were over Hurricanes. The one on 20 June was claimed against pilots from either No. 1 Squadron or No. 2 Squadron of the South African Air Force (SAAF); the pilot was reported killed. His victory on 24 June was over Pilot Officer James Alan Frederick Sowrey of No. 6 Squadron who was killed. Sowrey had been conducting a tactical reconnaissance mission alone when he was intercepted. The opponent claimed on 15 July was either a No. 73 Squadron or No. 229 Squadron RAF pilot. No. 73 and No. 229 Squadron patrolled the contested skies over Tobruk, when they spotted and chased a Bf 110 which led them to a formation of Ju 87 Stukas from II./Sturzkampfgeschwader 2. Müncheberg joined the battle with 7./JG 26 southwest of Ras Asaz. He fired at one fighter but could not observe the results when engaged by more. The pursuing Allied pilots were momentarily distracted by a nearby concentration of Ju 87s and Bf 110s, allowing Müncheberg to turn and claim a fighter shot down from behind the Bf 110 flown by Oberfeldwebel Heller, III./ZG 26. Records show Pilot Officer Lauder, No. 229 Squadron and Pilot Officer Moss, No. 73 Squadron were shot down while Squadron Leader Rosier's Hurricane was badly damaged. Müncheberg had accounted for his 46th victory. The final two victories in North Africa of 1941 were over Curtiss P-40 Warhawks, both on 29 July 1941, from No. 2 Squadron SAAF. One pilot survived, the other, Kolo Mason, did not return. Müncheberg's Staffel claimed eight victories during its brief African odyssey; their leader claimed five.

=== Channel operations ===
Fliegerführer Afrika received orders on 4 August 1941 to downsize the 7. Staffel in Africa to four aircraft. The remaining aircraft and aircrews were to relocate to France back to Jagdgeschwader 26. Before Müncheberg arrived in France, he stopped in Rome where he received the Gold Medal of Military Valour from Mussolini. He then travelled to the Wolf's Lair, Hitler's headquarters in Rastenburg, present-day Kętrzyn in Poland, for the Oak Leaves presentation. Following the presentation Müncheberg went on two weeks of vacation. Following their return from North Africa to France the pilots of 7. Staffel were given newer Bf 109 F-4 aircraft in replacement for the older Bf 109 E-7 type. Müncheberg claimed his first victory here on 26 August over a Spitfire and another one, his 50th overall, on 29 August. He claimed two Spitfires on 4 September and one more from No. 71 Squadron three days later. Fighter Command attributed the loss of Sergeant A E Gray, No. 611 Squadron, flying of "Circus" No. 87, was captured to Müncheberg's claim. The following day eleven fighters were lost, with nine pilots killed and one captured. Only one loss is attributed to a specific unit—ZG 76. Ten Spitfires were lost on 4 September—eight to aerial combat and one to ground fire. Six formed part of "Circus" No. 93. The action cost No. 71 Squadron two pilots killed, one captured and one wounded. Three Spitfires were destroyed and one damaged.

On 19 September 1941, Müncheberg was promoted to the rank of Hauptmann and became Gruppenkommandeur of II./JG 26 "Schlageter" following the death of Hauptmann Walter Adolph the day before, in aerial combat with RAF Spitfire fighters. Müncheberg's position of Staffelkapitän of the 7. Staffel was passed on to Oberleutnant Klaus Mietusch. II. Gruppe had already been equipped with the new Focke-Wulf Fw 190 A-1. It was the first Gruppe in the Luftwaffe completely equipped with the Fw 190. Müncheberg's number of victories continued to increase; all but his 55th on 18 September, which was over a No. 607 Squadron Hurricane, were claimed against Spitfires. Galland was replaced by Schöpfel on 5 December as Geschwaderkommodore of JG 26 "Schlageter". Reichsmarschall Hermann Göring had appointed Galland as General der Jagdflieger (General of Fighters) following the death of Oberst Werner Mölders.

On 8 November 1941, in an air battle near Dunkirk which involved Spitfire Vb's of RCAF No. 412 Squadron, based at RAF Wellingore, Müncheberg attacked a section of four Spitfires, shooting down three of them; all three pilots were killed. The fourth Spitfire in the section, which was undamaged, and its pilot unharmed, was flown by John Gillespie Magee Jr., author of the famous aviation poem, "High Flight." Three pilots from the squadron were reported killed by Fighter Command. Squadron Leader C Bushell was killed, on what was "Circus" No. 110. JG 26 was credited with the destruction of two Spitfires from No. 401 (Canadian) Squadron the same day. One pilot was killed and another wounded and captured. A further pilot from No. 308 Polish Fighter Squadron was killed in action with JG 26 along with two from No. 452 (Australian) Squadron. Two more Fighter Command aircraft are known to have been lost in combat with unknown German fighter units, four to unstated causes, one to fuel starvation, one to engine trouble and another to ground fire.

On 8 December Müncheberg achieved his 60th aerial victory which was announced in the Wehrmachtbericht, his third such mention. He claimed his 61st and 62nd overall victory and the last of the year 1941 on 16 December 1941. The claims are confirmed as aircraft belonging to No. 411 (Canadian) Squadron. Pilot Officer G A Chamberlain and Sergeant T D Holden were killed. Müncheberg went on a lengthy vacation in early 1942, not returning before March 1942. He therefore did not participate in Operation Donnerkeil, the air superiority operation to support the Kriegsmarine's (German Navy) Operation Cerberus, which was executed on 11–12 February 1942. Müncheberg claimed the first victory following his vacation on 13 March 1942, a Spitfire of No. 124 Squadron. During his absence the Fw 190 A-1 and A-2 had been replaced with the newer A-3 variant. Two Spitfires of No. 412 Squadron fell to his guns on 24 March which brought his score to 65. In the former engagement, Fighter Command attributes four losses to combat with JG 26. No. 124 Squadron lost two of them, while losing a third in combat with JG 2. Czech pilot Flight Lieutenant J Kulhanek was killed and American Sergeant E Pendelton was captured after combat with JG 26 Fw 190s. No. 401 and No. 602 Squadrons lost one fighter each in combat with JG 26. In the latter battle Müncheberg shot down Squadron Leader, No. 412 Squadron, J D Morrison who was killed and Pilot Officer A T A Young, who was captured.

Müncheberg claimed his 70th and 71st victory on 26 April within two minutes of combat. II. Gruppe at the time was referred to as the "Abbeville Boys" by the RAF pilots based on the Abbeville airfield where they were stationed. On 29 April 1942, he probably shot down and killed No. 131 Wing RAF leader and Polish ace Wing Commander Marian Pisarek. On 2 June, Müncheberg was credited with the destruction of two Spitfires taking his total to 81 aerial victories. This achievement was announced on 4 June 1942 in the Wehrmachtbericht and was followed by the presentation of the German Cross in Gold (Deutsches Kreuz in Gold) on 5 June. 403 Squadron was led by Squadron Leader Al Deere. Deere ordered his pilots to conduct a three-way break with the hope of turning on their attackers from Müncheberg's group in a head-on position. Other Spitfire units nearby, mindful of the unfavourable tactical situation did not support Deere. The dogfight caused the destruction of seven No. 403 Squadron Spitfires, four pilots were captured and one killed. He claimed his final two victories (82–83) with II. Gruppe on 20 June 1942 in combat with Spitfires of No. 118 and No. 501 Squadron. II. Gruppe was credited with the destruction of five enemy aircraft for one pilot killed; 118 reported four losses and 501 a single fighter lost. No. 118, No. 133 and No. 501 Squadron lost four, one and one Spitfires respectively while No. 501 suffered a further damage. Four pilots were killed, two were captured while one was safe. Attribution by Fighter Command in each case was either to JG 2 and JG 26. The German fighter wings claimed 10 Spitfires in total between them.

=== Eastern Front ===
Following his 83rd aerial victory, Müncheberg was summoned to his commanding officer, Geschwaderkommodore Schöpfel, who informed him of his transfer to Jagdgeschwader 51 (JG 51—51st Fighter Wing) on the Eastern Front. Müncheberg was destined to become a Geschwaderkommodore but prior to receiving his own command, he would have to serve as a Kommodore in training. He went on three-week home leave, staying at his parents' home, before he received his orders to head east on 21 July 1942.

On his way to the Eastern Front, Müncheberg travelled to Berlin where he briefly served on the staff of the General der Jagdflieger Galland discussing air combat tactics and how to lead a fighter wing. On 26 July 1942, he participated in the German track and field championships, starting for the ASV Köln in the decathlon. Müncheberg finally arrived on the Eastern Front in early August 1942 where he was welcomed by the Geschwaderkommodore of JG 51, Major Karl-Gottfried Nordmann. Initially Müncheberg believed that combat on the Eastern Front was child's play in comparison to the Western Front. He was shot down or damaged on two or three occasions. His first major task was re-equipping JG 51 with the Fw 190. Under his leadership JG 51 became the first fighter wing on the Eastern Front to be equipped with this type. He claimed his first victories in the east on 3 August 1942, shooting down two Petlyakov Pe-2 dive bombers near Rzhev.

He quickly achieved further victories, reaching 90 victories on 22 August and surpassing the 100 victories on 5 September. He was the 19th Luftwaffe pilot to achieve the century mark. On 9 September, he was awarded the Knight's Cross of the Iron Cross with Oak Leaves and Swords (Ritterkreuz des Eisernen Kreuzes mit Eichenlaub und Schwertern) following his 103rd victory. Müncheberg was the 19th member of the Wehrmacht to receive the award. Müncheberg claimed his last victory in this theatre on 27 September 1942, claiming 33 victories in total over Russian aircraft, this took his overall score to 116 aerial victories. He was then ordered to the Wolf's Lair where Hitler presented him the Swords to his Knight's Cross with Oak Leaves. Following the award ceremony he was granted home leave before being appointed Geschwaderkommodore of Jagdgeschwader 77 (JG 77—77th Fighter Wing), replacing Gordon Gollob in this role.

=== North Africa ===
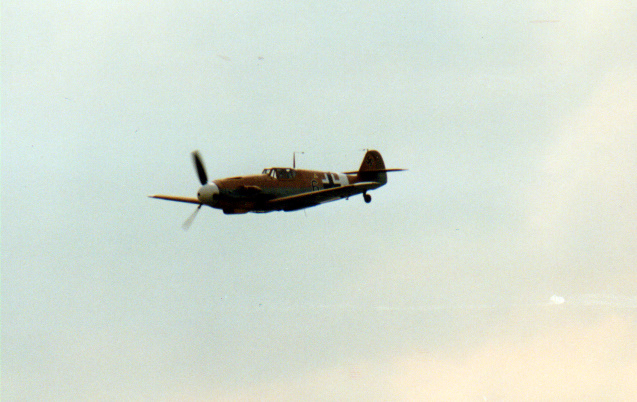
Bf 109G-2/trop "Black 6", formerly of JG 77 (1996), prior to its crash. Müncheberg flew this exact type.

Müncheberg took over command of Jagdgeschwader 77 on 1 October 1942. Jagdgeschwader 77 at the time was deployed on the southern sector of the Eastern Front and was scheduled to relocate to North Africa where I. Gruppe under the command of Heinz Bär arrived in Ain el Gazala on 26 October. Under the leadership of Müncheberg, the Geschwaderstab (headquarters unit) which was equipped with new Bf 109 G-2s, arrived on 1 November.

He scored over a No. 92 Squadron Spitfire piloted by Flight Sergeant Blade on 9 November. Lieutenant M Marshall, 1 SAAF, was killed in combat on 27 November 1942 when Müncheberg dived to attack ten of their fighters. Marshall's Spitfire shed a wing before spinning into the ground. Three other SAAF pilots were killed in the engagement—the Germans reported no losses. Promoted to Major on 30 November 1942, he claimed a No. 601 Squadron fighter 10 December and made a forced landing in his Bf 109 G-2 (Werknummer 10 725—factory number; 35% damage) following combat with a P-40 of the 66th Fighter-Interceptor Squadron, 57th Fighter Group, United States Army Air Forces (USAAF). Warrant Officer B. Raises was posted missing in action from No. 601 Squadron. On 15 December, while flying a patrol during the Battle of El Agheila, Müncheberg intercepted P-40s from the 64th Fighter Squadron, 57th Fighter Group accompanied by 12 bomb-carrying P-40s from No. 112 Squadron. Müncheberg shot down two USAAF P-40s. Second Lieutenants Chester Kroplodowski was reported missing, presumed killed, and Steven Merena was captured. On 15 December Müncheberg took off with seven Bf 109s from III./JG 77 and attacked eleven British P-40s practicing ground attack tactics; he claimed one shot down. The pilot, RCAF Sgt N. E. McKee, crashed onto the shore and was captured.

Müncheberg accounted for three P-40s on 14 January 1943 in a single combat. German pilots claimed 24 P-40s on this day. Actual British Commonwealth casualties were 12 destroyed and two damaged with five killed, one missing and one wounded. US forces reported on loss from the 85th Fighter Squadron, 79th Fighter Group. On 22 January Müncheberg accounted for two 3 RAAF P-40s. Sergeant Righetti parachuted out and Flying Officer Russell was wounded and his aircraft damaged. Another success claimed on 28 January was a P-40 belonging to the 33rd Fighter Group which crashed. On 10 March Müncheberg claimed Flight Lieutenant R. R. Smith DFC, a Canadian pilot with 8 victory claims who was captured. No. 112 Squadron lost six in that fight, but claimed their 200th victory. A Bell P-39 Airacobra from 93d Fighter Squadron, 81st Fighter Group was claimed that day. Three days later, 10 P-39s of the 92nd Squadron and two from the 91st Squadron, 81st Fighter Group were ordered to attack targets of opportunity in the La Fauconnerie area. Spitfires of the 307th and 308th Squadrons of the 31st Fighter Group acted as escort but were distracted by Fw 190s and left the P-39s unprotected. Müncheberg claimed one, Ernst-Wilhelm Reinert, claimed four and Siegfried Freytag claimed two. The US units lost seven; Lieutenants Murray, Turkington, Smith, Leech, McCreight and Lewis of the 93rd and Lt Lyons of the 91st were lost. Murray escaped and returned the following day. The success was added to another claimed earlier in the morning when his unit engaged 34 P-40s from the US 57th Fighter Group, containing the 64th, 65th and 66th Squadrons. Reinert and another pilot claimed two each—the Americans lost four, with one pilot escaping to Allied lines, and most likely the pilot shot down by Müncheberg.

=== Death ===
Müncheberg was killed in an engagement in his Bf 109 G-6 (Werknummer 16 381) on 23 March 1943 over Tunisia when his 135th victim, a USAAF 52nd Fighter Group Spitfire exploded in front of him after a close-range burst of cannon fire, incapacitating Muncheberg's aircraft. The Spitfire was piloted by Captain Theodore Sweetland. Captain Hugh L. Williamson, who was also shot down in the engagement, later stated that he thought Sweetland had deliberately rammed Müncheberg's aircraft. Müncheberg's speed had been the fatal contributing factor, leaving him unable to avoid the rapidly approaching Spitfire. One of his wings snapped off during the collision and fluttered down suggesting a collision. Müncheberg's body was originally buried at El Aouina; it was later moved to the "Heroes' Cemetery" at Tunis. In the 1950s, it was moved again and re-buried at the German Military Cemetery at Bordj-Cedria. After the Luftwaffe reported his death, the fact made news in Britain along with the death of Hans Beißwenger in a 1943 issue of The Aeroplane, entitled "Gap in the Fighter Ranks".

== Summary of career ==
=== Aerial victory claims ===
According to US historian David T. Zabecki, Müncheberg was credited with 135 aerial victories. His 135 aerial victories were claimed in more than 500 combat missions, 102 on the Western Front - including 19 over Malta, one in Yugoslavia and 24 in North Africa - and 33 on the Eastern Front. In addition, Spick lists him with a mission-to-claim ratio of 3.70. His tally includes at least 46 Supermarine Spitfire fighter aircraft shot down. Mathews and Foreman, authors of Luftwaffe Aces - Biographies and Victory Claims, researched the German Federal Archives and found documentation for 135 aerial victory claims, plus nine further unconfirmed claims. This number includes 102 on the Western Front and 33 on the Eastern Front.

=== Awards and honours ===
- Iron Cross (1939)
  - 2nd Class (17 September 1939) (Note: According to Röll on 9 November 1939.)
  - 1st Class (10 May 1940)
- German Cross in Gold on 5 June 1942 as Hauptmann in the II./Jagdgeschwader 26
- Knight's Cross of the Iron Cross with Oak Leaves and Swords
  - Knight's Cross on 14 September 1940 as Oberleutnant and Staffelkapitän of the 7./Jagdgeschwader 26 "Schlageter" (Note: According to Scherzer as adjutant in the III./Jagdgeschwader 26 "Schlageter".)
  - 12th Oak Leaves on 7 May 1941 as Oberleutnant and Staffelkapitän of the 7./Jagdgeschwader 26 "Schlageter"
  - 19th Swords on 9 September 1942 as Hauptmann and deputy Geschwaderkommodore of Jagdgeschwader 51 "Mölders"
- Gold Medal of Military Valor (7 May 1941)

On 30 November 1962 an honorary one-time pension of 1,500 DM was paid to the relatives of Müncheberg (and relatives of Hans-Joachim Marseille) by the Italian Minister of Defence Giulio Andreotti.

=== Dates of rank ===
1 August 1937:	Fahnenjunker-Unteroffizier
16 December 1937:	Fähnrich
13 September 1938:	Oberfähnrich
8 November 1938:	Leutnant (Second Lieutenant)
19 July 1940:	Oberleutnant (First Lieutenant)
19 September 1941:	Hauptmann (Captain)
30 November 1942:	Major (Major)

== Notes ==
Military offices
Preceded by Major Gordon Gollob	Commander of Jagdgeschwader 77 Herz As; 1 October 1942 – 23 March 1943	Succeeded by Oberstleutnant Johannes Steinhoff
