= Jānis Geste =

Latvian journalist (born 1983)

Jānis Geste (born 3 January 1983 in Užava) is a Latvian journalist and TV presenter. He was injured while reporting on the 2009 Riga riot. In 2012, he received the Latvian Journalists' Union Award for Best Young Journalist.
