= American Orff-Schulwerk Association =

The American Orff-Schulwerk Association (AOSA) is an organization of American music educators dedicated to utilizing, advancing and preserving Orff-Schulwerk, a developmental learning approach to music education which was created by composer Carl Orff and his colleague Gunild Keetman. It is an affiliate of the National Association for Music Education, the National Music Council, and the Orff-Schulwerk Forum in Salzburg, Austria. With approximately 4,500 members, it is one of the larger professional organizations for music educators in the United States.

AOSA offers several opportunities for professional development, including an annual national conference and the quarterly academic journal The Orff Echo. The organization has 96 local chapters throughout the United States which also provide workshops locally to their members. AOSA is also responsible for accrediting and organizing graduate level certifications in Orff-Schulwerk at numerous universities throughout the United States. A certificate in Orff-Schulwerk requires the successful completion of three graduate level courses in Orff-Schulwerk.

== History ==
AOSA was founded in 1968 in Muncie, Indiana by ten music teachers. Its founding members were:

- Arnold E. Burkart
- Isabel McNeill Carley
- Norman Goldberg
- Ruth Pollock Hamm
- Joachim Matthesius
- Elizabeth Nichols
- Jacobeth Postl
- Wilma Salzman
- Jacques Schneider
- William Wakeland

== AOSA accredited graduate courses ==
The following is a list of universities that offer AOSA accredited graduate music studies in Orff-Schulwerk:

- Anderson University (Indiana)
- Appalachian State University
- Arizona State University
- Baker University
- Baldwin Wallace University
- Belmont University
- Boston University
- Bridgewater State University
- California State University Los Angeles
- DePaul University
- Drake University
- Eastman School of Music
- Florida State University
- George Mason University
- Gordon College
- Hofstra University
- Illinois State University
- Madonna University
- Miami University
- Samford University
- Southern Methodist University
- Stetson University
- The Hartt School
- Trinity University
- University of Alaska
- University of Arkansas
- University of Central Arkansas
- University of Georgia
- University of Kentucky
- University of Memphis
- University of Mississippi
- University of Missouri at St. Louis
- University of Nebraska–Lincoln
- University of Nevada, Las Vegas
- University of Northern Colorado
- University of Southern Maine
- University of St. Thomas
- Utah State University
- VanderCook College of Music
- Villanova University
- Virginia Commonwealth University
- West Chester University

== Sources ==
- Michael Mark (2008). A Concise History of American Music Education. R&L Education. pp. 159–160.
- Michael L. Mark; Patrice Madura (2012). Contemporary Music Education, 4th ed. Cengage Learning. pp. 104–106.
