= Darskowo, Drawsko County =

Darskowo
- Village
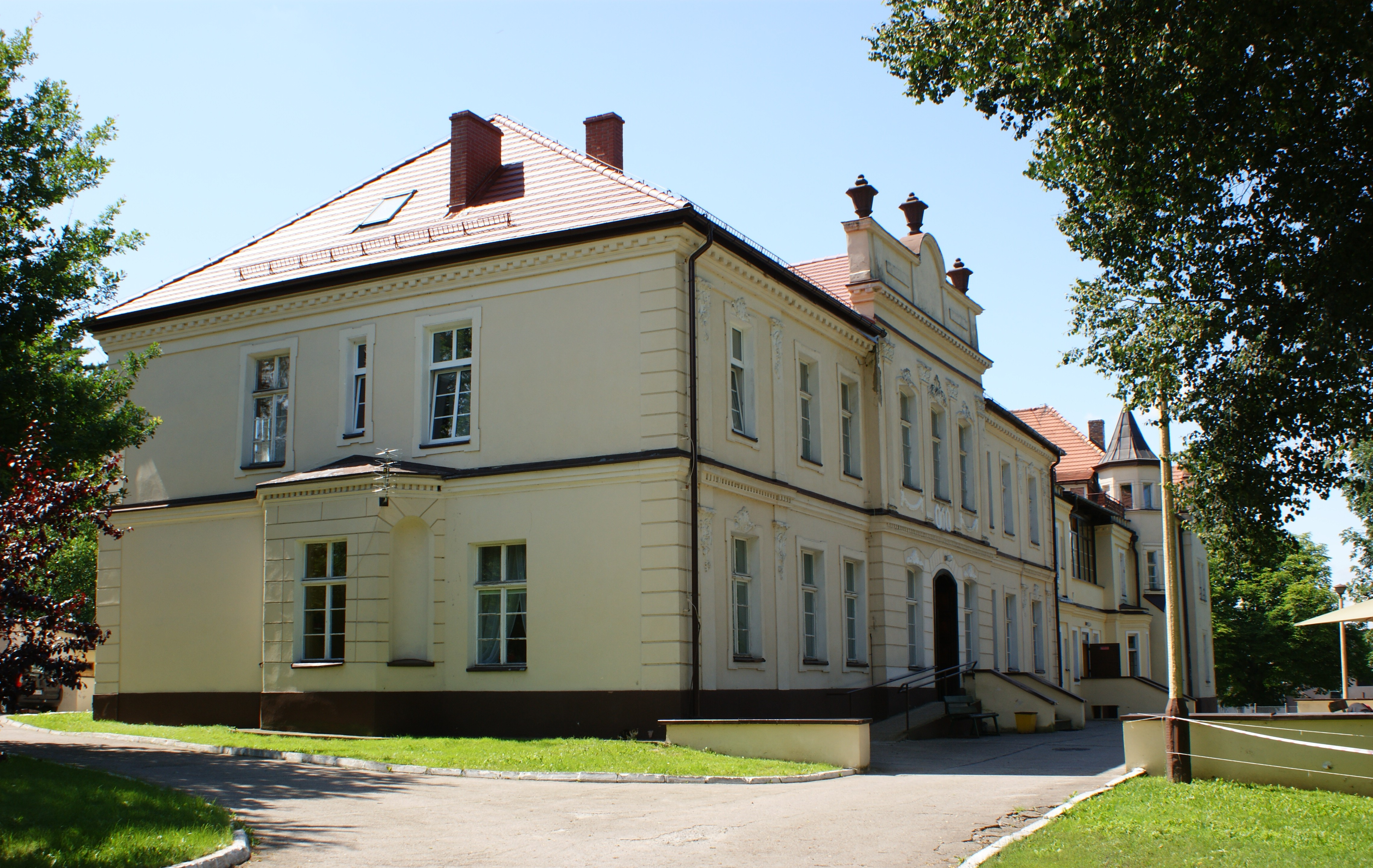
- Nursing home in Darskowo

- Location within Poland
- Coordinates: 53°32′N 15°57′E
- Country: Poland
- Voivodeship: West Pomeranian
- County: Drawsko
- Gmina: Złocieniec

Population
  - Total: 340
- Time zone: UTC+1 (CET)
  - Summer (DST): UTC+2 (CEST)

Darskowo [darsˈkɔvɔ] (German: Friedrichsdorf) is a village in the administrative district of Gmina Złocieniec, within Drawsko County, West Pomeranian Voivodeship, in north-western Poland. It lies approximately 5 km (3 mi) west of Złocieniec, 10 km (6 mi) east of Drawsko Pomorskie, and 92 km (57 mi) east of the regional capital Szczecin.

The village has a population of 340.

== History ==
During World War II the Germans established and operated a forced labour camp for prisoners of war of various nationalities in the village. On 29 January 1945, the village was the site of the second stop during the German-organised march of some 6,000 Polish prisoners of war from the Oflag II-D camp headed westwards.

== Sights ==
There is a nursing home and a historic church of Saints Peter and Paul in Darskowo.

== Notable residents ==
- Joachim Müncheberg (1918-1943), Luftwaffe pilot
