= Assassination of Sidónio Pais =

1918 murder in Lisbon, Portugal

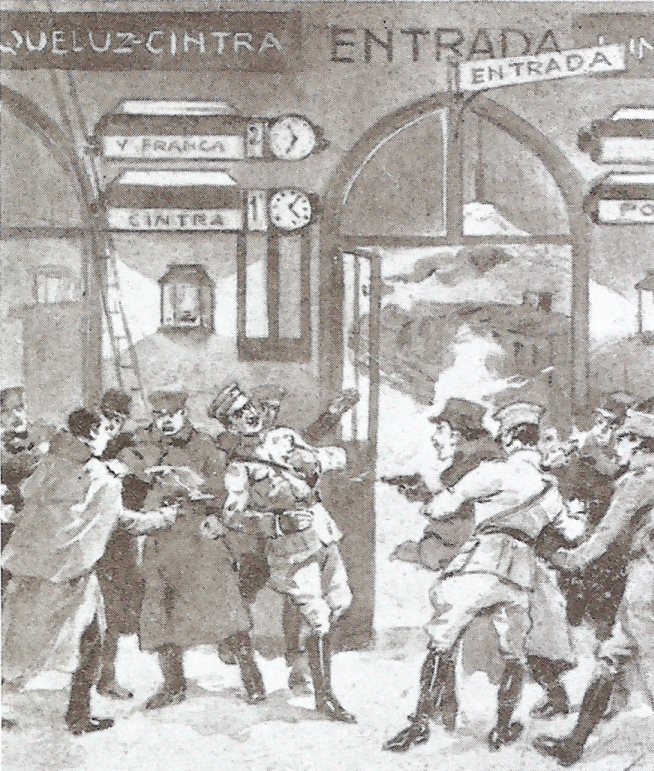
- José Júlio da Costa shoots President Pais with a pistol.
- Location: 38°42′N 9°8′W; Lisboa-Rossio Railway Station, Lisbon, Portugal
- Date: 14 December 1918; Evening (around 11 pm)
- Target: Sidónio Pais (died the same day of his wounds)
- Weapon: Pistol
- Perpetrator: José Júlio da Costa (Died in Psychiatric Hospital 16 March 1946)
- Motive: Revenge, Political Ideas

The fourth President of Portugal, Sidónio Pais, was shot and fatally wounded at the Lisboa-Rossio Railway Station in Lisbon, Portugal on 14 December 1918. The act was carried out by the left-wing political activist José Júlio da Costa.

== Assassination ==
Portuguese President Sidónio Pais was on his way to the Lisboa-Rossio Railway Station after he had dinner at the Silva Restaurant, at the Chiado. He was accompanied by his brother and his son and was going to take the train to Porto to confer with the Board of the Northern Military. When he entered the station at around 11 p.m. on 14 December 1918, he was received by a Republican Guard to protect him. There had been a failed assassination attempt on the President on 6 December and so the security was higher than ever, but that could not spoil the mood as a band played a popular song when he entered the station.

Morro bem! Salvem a Pátria! [I die well! Save the Fatherland!]

— Reporter Reinaldo Ferreira, describing Sidónio's Pais supposed dying words, 14 December 1918.

The President did not know that José Júlio da Costa was waiting for him with a pistol, that the assassin had concealed in his Alentejo Cloak. When the President passed by the assassin on the first floor of Rossio station, the assassin penetrated the double police cordon that surrounded the President and fired two shots from the pistol hidden under his Alentejo cloak.

The first shot hit Pais in the right arm, and the bullet became lodged in his arm, but the second shot hit the President in the stomach, which made it a fatal wound. The President fell immediately to the ground, and panic broke out. During the confusion, four innocent bystanders were fatally wounded by the guards. The assassin did not try to escape but was arrested after he had been brutally beaten by the crowd.

The President was still alive at this point and was rushed to St. Joseph Hospital, but died of his wounds en route to the hospital shortly before midnight.

== Aftermath ==
The assassination was a traumatic moment for the First Republic of Portugal since semblance of stability vanished. A permanent crisis started and ended only after almost eight years with the National Revolution of 28 May 1926, which ended the regime. New elections were held two days after the assassination to elect a new President.

His funeral was momentous and brought together tens of thousands of people. The funeral, however, was interrupted by multiple violent incidents since some viewed him as a dictator. He was called a true King President and entered the Portuguese imaginary, in particular in some of the most conservative Catholic sectors. He is viewed as a mix of saviour and martyr by some Portuguese.

The image of a martyr led to the emergence of a popular cult, similar to what exists around the figure Sousa Martins, who made Pais holy with promises of honours and ex-votos, and it still remains. Flowers and other votive elements are commonly lain next to Pais's grave.
