= Isabel McNeill Carley =

American writer and composer (1918–2011)

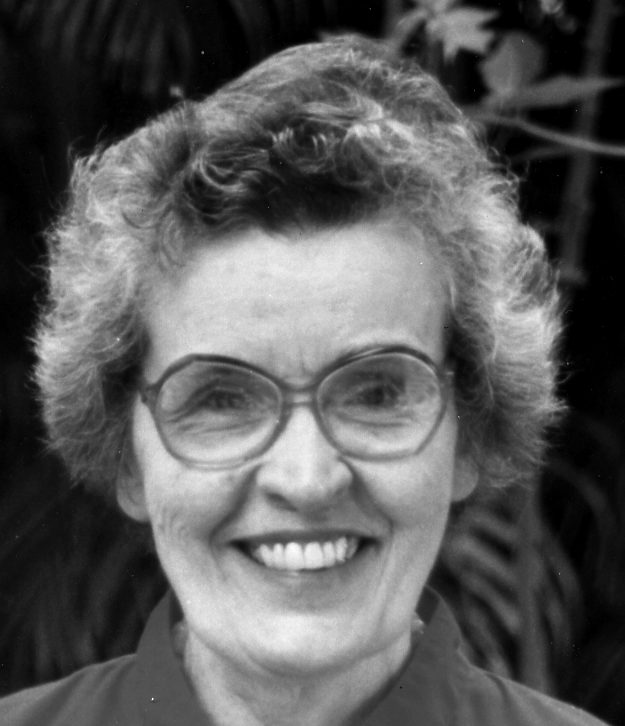
- Born: Isabel McNeill; 4 December 1918; Chicago, Illinois, US
- Died: 14 July 2011 (aged 92); Gaithersburg, Maryland, US
- Occupations: Writer; composer; music educator
- Known for: Co-founder of American Orff-Schulwerk Association
- Spouse: James Carley (married 1943)
- Children: Elizabeth Carley Oddy; John M. Carley; Anne M. Carley
- Parents: John T. McNeill; Netta H. McNeill

Isabel McNeill Carley (4 December 1918 – 14 July 2011) was a published writer, editor, composer and music teacher. She is considered one of the leaders of the Orff Schulwerk when it began to take hold in the United States in the 1960s. As a co-founder of the American Orff-Schulwerk Association (AOSA), Carley contributed greatly to the organization's beginnings, serving as a board member and magazine editor. Carley devoted much of her life to musical instruction, publishing a series of books titled Recorder Improvisation and Technique.

Carley died on 14 July 2011, at her home in Gaithersburg, Maryland.

== Early life and education ==
Daughter of John T. and Netta H. McNeill, Isabel McNeill was born on 4 December 1918, in Chicago, Illinois, and grew up there and in Toronto, Ontario, Canada. In 1943, she married James Carley, who served in the United States Army and later pursued a career as a music professor. They had two daughters, Elizabeth and Anne, and one son, John.

Carley lived in various locations over the course of her lifetime. During World War II, she moved to her husband's post in Alamogordo, New Mexico. For the next ten years, she and her family lived in New York, Oregon and Texas. In 1953, they moved to Indianapolis, Indiana. After her husband's retirement in 1973, they lived in western North Carolina for thirty years. After her retirement in 2004, she and her husband settled in Gaithersburg, Maryland.

Carley's education focused primarily on music. In 1939, she attended Queen's University at Kingston in Ontario, obtaining a Bachelor of Arts in German, philosophy and the classics. In 1941, she attended graduate school at the University of Chicago and earned a master's degree in music history. Carley's interest in music education intensified in 1962 when she took an Orff-Schulwerk course in Toronto and subsequently enrolled in the Orff-Institute in Salzburg, Austria, for the 1963–64 academic year. During her time at the institute, she obtained private lessons from Carl Orff and participated in 36 hours of classes weekly. Carley completed a three-year education program in one year and earned a Specialist Diploma with honors to become the first American honors graduate at the institute.

== Career ==
=== Teaching ===
Carley devoted over sixty years of her life to music education and composition. She instructed children and adults in the United States and abroad. She pursued doctoral work at the University of Chicago in 1941-42 and taught a humanities survey course at Stephens College in 1943. In 1949, after World War II ended, she taught pre-school music classes to children in addition to private lessons in piano, recorder, hand-drum and ensemble.

=== American Orff-Schulwerk Association ===
In 1968, Carley co-founded the American Orff-Schulwerk Association (AOSA) and continued her involvement with the organization for over thirty years. She served on the AOSA board and The Orff Echo board during its first fifteen years of publication (1968-1983). She is credited with transforming the publication "from a slick newspaper to a professional journal".

Carley also organized numerous Orff certification courses through AOSA. From 1992 to 1995, she contributed to the AOSA Recorder and Curriculum Task Forces. Additionally, she taught courses in the United States (including Ball State University, University of Cincinnati, Rutgers University, Florida Atlantic University, Florida State University), and in Puerto Rico and Taiwan. Carley also participated in national and state-level National Association for Music Education (then known as the Music Educators National Conference) events and AOSA conferences.

In honor of her contributions to the organization, Carley achieved the AOSA Distinguished Service Award in 1998. The organization also established the Isabel McNeill Carley Library in 1982.

== Philosophical views ==
In her classes from pre-school to adult, Carley taught the importance of improvisation, speech and ensemble. She admired the Orff Schulwerk, calling it "music education taking the composer’s point of view, an approach not tied to one single period or tradition [and] fostering innate musicality and building fundamentals like increased aural discrimination and muscular control".

Describing her approach to applying Orff Schulwerk to North American students, Isabel Carley wrote, "I have attempted to construct a new kind of [American] curriculum, one that keeps repeating key activities, but with a difference each time. [This means] new suggestions, new demands, new contexts, new combinations of movement, of speech, song and accompaniments, using body percussion, unpitched percussion, and one or two bar instruments – whatever seems appropriate and the class is ready to play with."

Carley's theoretical work identified the expanded tonal possibilities within the gapped pentatonic scales typically used in Orff-Schulwerk music for children. She identified and promoted the use in classrooms of the rich heritage in North America of pentatonic folk songs, many of them in pentatonic modes not based on the tonic. Carley cited examples like "Nottamun Town" (La Pentatonic), "The Cherry-Tree Carol" (La Pentatonic, Plagal), "Pretty Saro" (So Pentatonic, Authentic) and "Shady Grove" (Re Pentatonic, Authentic).

Rejecting rote learning of prepackaged performances, Carley exhorted teachers to "see to it that every child is included and challenged at an appropriate level", believing that "[m]usicality is not simply another reading skill or a laborious cultivation of various kinds of physical dexterity. It is the joy of real creative music making in the classroom".

== Published works ==
Carley's published works include beginning and intermediate piano compositions; collections of singing games and activities for young children; instructional books for the recorder, for children and adults; collections of Medieval and Renaissance dances and music for the classroom; recorder repertoire for adult ensembles; choral church music, and numerous essays and editorials for The Orff Echo, American Recorder, Ostinato (Orff Canada) and other publications. Carley edited two collections of essays and articles from The Orff Echo, 1969–1985, titled Orff Re-Echoes Books I and II.

=== Recorder Improvisation and Technique (RIT) series ===
In the 1970s, Carley published the Recorder Improvisation and Technique (RIT) books, a series of three books intended initially for use at the Orff certification courses at the University of Denver under the direction of Barbara Grenoble. She published the books through Brasstown Press, a publishing company founded by her and her husband. In writing the books, she sought to create a "more integrated approach to using the recorder as an essential part of the learning experience in the Orff classroom". The books contain lessons in playing the recorder, musical improvisation, ensemble musicianship, and speech, movement and compositional form.

Each of the three books is divided into short lessons. Book One, subtitled "Beginning with the Soprano Recorder", is an introduction to the recorder and improvisation techniques. The second book, subtitled "Intermediate for Alto and Soprano Recorder" transfers familiar fingering patterns to the alto recorder and introduces hexatonic and diatonic major and minor modes, along with exercises in improvisation and technique. Book Three, subtitled "Advanced: Composing, Arranging, Analysis" expands on the previous materials and parallels the Orff Schulwerk volumes III and V, introducing major and minor modes with functional harmony, along with many historical techniques of ornamentation and improvisation such as heterophony, variation and chaconne. Book Three also explores improvisation for movement, free solo improvisation and various kinds of group improvisation.

Before Carley's death in July 2011, her daughter Anne M. Carley undertook the project of producing new editions of the RIT books as well as editing selected essays into a companion book, Making It Up As You Go. Nearly half the essays are new work, previously unpublished, from Carley's handwritten manuscripts, typescripts and computer files. Grouped into three sections, Origins, Practicum and Exhortations, the book provides information and opinion from the life of an early pioneer of the Orff Approach in North America.

The project, collectively, the Isabel McNeill Carley Orff Essentials Collection, published by Brasstown Press, was completed in the fall of 2011. New editions of Carley's Five Little Books appeared in 2013, and another collection of essays, Taking the Orff Approach to Heart, was published in 2015 as an e-book.

=== Selected music publications ===
- The Magic Circle (1966)
- Carols and Anthems from the Schulwerk I and II, Editor (1972)
- Simple Settings – American Folk Songs and Rhymes with Orff Ensemble Book 1, CDEGA Pentatonic (1972)
- Simple Settings – American Folk Songs and Rhymes with Orff Ensemble Book 2 (1974)
- Music for Children Orff Schulwerk American Edition Book 2, Contributor (1977)
- Music for Children Orff Schulwerk American Edition Book 3, Contributor (1980)
- Music for Children Orff Schulwerk American Edition Book 1, Contributor (1982)
- Recorders with Orff Ensemble I (1982)
- For Hand Drums and Recorders (1983)
- Recorders with Orff Ensemble II and III (1984)
- Renaissance Dances for Dancers Young and Old (2000)
- Medieval and Renaissance Dances for Recorders, Dancers and Hand Drums (2000)
- That First Christmas Day, Choristers Guild A-160 (before 1982)
