= Erich Leie =

German World War II flying ace and wing commander (1916–1945)

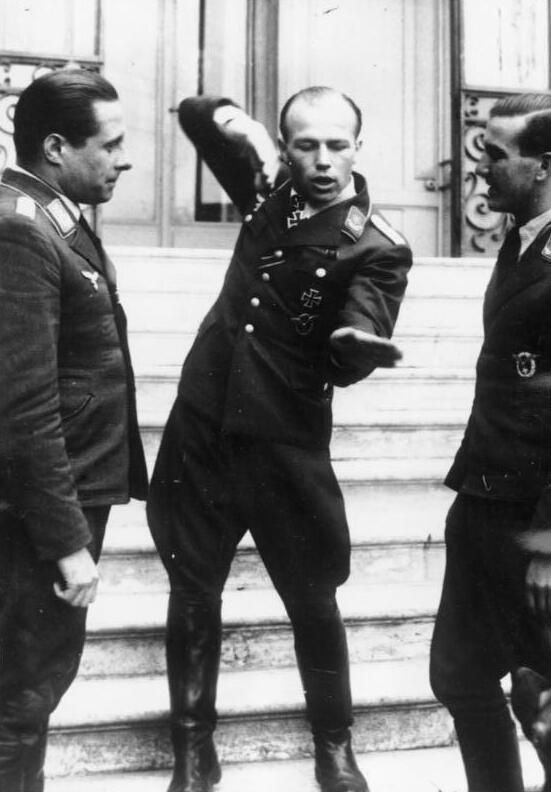
- Helmut Wick (center), Erich Leie (right) on 6 October 1940
- Born: 10 September 1916; Kiel, German Empire
- Died: 7 March 1945 (aged 28); Bielitz, German-occupied Poland
- Cause of death: Killed in action
- Burial place: Cemetery in Valašské Meziříčí
- Military career
- Allegiance: Nazi Germany
- Branch: Luftwaffe
- Service years: 1936–1945
- Rank: Oberstleutnant (lieutenant colonel)
- Units: JG 71, JG 2, JG 51, JG 77
- Commands: I./JG 2, I./JG 51, JG 77
- Conflicts: See battles World War II: Western Front; Battle of France; Battle of Britain; Channel Dash; Eastern Front †
- Awards: Knight's Cross of the Iron Cross

Erich Leie (10 September 1916 – 7 March 1945) was a German Luftwaffe military aviator and wing commander during World War II. As a fighter ace, he is credited with 121 aerial victories claimed in more than 500 combat missions. He claimed 44 on Western Front, 77 on the Eastern Front, including one four-engine bomber.

Born in Kiel, Leie grew up in the Weimar Republic and Nazi Germany. In 1939, he served with Jagdgeschwader 51 (JG 51—51st Fighter Wing) before he was transferred to Jagdgeschwader 2 "Richthofen" (JG 2—2nd Fighter Wing) in early 1940. Flying with this wing, Leie claimed his first aerial victory on 14 May during the Battle of France and received the Knight's Cross of the Iron Cross on 1 August 1941. In June 1942, he was given command of I. Gruppe of JG 2. In 1943, he transferred back to JG 51 where he commanded I. Gruppe. This unit fought on the Eastern Front where he claimed his 100th aerial victory on 6 November 1943. In December 1944, he was given command of Jagdgeschwader 77 (JG 77—77th Fighter Wing). Leie was killed in action on 7 March 1945. Posthumously, he was promoted to Oberstleutnant (lieutenant colonel) and nominated for the Knight's Cross of the Iron Cross with Oak Leaves.

== Early life and career ==
Leie was born on 10 September 1916 in Kiel, at the time in the Province of Schleswig-Holstein, a province of the Kingdom of Prussia. In August 1939, Leie temporarily led the Reservestaffel of Jagdgeschwader 71 (JG 71—71st Fighter Wing) until he was replaced by Oberleutnant (First Lieutenant) Horst Tietzen on 29 August. (Note: For an explanation of Luftwaffe unit designations see Organization of the Luftwaffe during World War II.) The Reservestaffel was a training squadron equipped with the Messerschmitt Bf 109 D-1, at the time based at Bad Aibling and subordinated to the I. Gruppe (1st group) of Jagdgeschwader 51 (JG 51—51st Fighter Wing). On 26 August, during the German mobilization phase, the Reservestaffel was ordered to Fürstenfeldbruck where it was tasked with providing fighter protection over Munich.

== World War II ==
World War II in Europe had begun on Friday 1 September 1939 when German forces invaded Poland. On 21 March 1940, Leie was transferred to III. Gruppe (3rd group) of Jagdgeschwader 2 "Richthofen" (JG 2—2nd Fighter Wing), named after World War I fighter ace Manfred von Richthofen. He claimed his first victory on 14 May during the Battle of France when he shot down a Bristol Blenheim bomber 12 kilometres (7.5 miles) east of Sedan. By October 1940, Leie was serving with the Geschwaderstab (headquarters unit) of JG 2. On 28 November 1940, Leie was wingman of Major (Major) Helmut Wick, Geschwaderkommodore (wing commander) of JG 2, on a mission to the Isle of Weight. Leie claimed a Supermarine Spitfire fighter destroyed, his eleventh aerial victory. On that mission, Wick was killed in action when he was shot down, probably by Flight Lieutenant John Dundas of No. 609 Squadron who was also killed that day.

On 23 July 1941, he claimed six Spitfires shot down in one day, an "ace-in-a-day" achievement, taking his total to 21 aerial victories. For this, Leie was awarded the Knight's Cross of the Iron Cross (Ritterkreuz des Eisernen Kreuzes) on 1 August 1941. He received the award from Feldmarschall (Field Marschal) Hugo Sperrle with fellow JG 2 "Richthofen" pilots Leutnant Egon Mayer and Oberleutnant Rudolf Pflanz on that day. The triple award presentation was recorded by the Deutsche Wochenschau (German Weekly Review), a newsreel series released in the cinemas. By the end of 1941, his total stood at 32 aerial victories. His 32nd claim was a Handley Page Halifax heavy bomber shot down on 30 December in the vicinity of Brest. On 26 January 1942, Leie claimed a Spitfire shot down south of Rame Head. The Spitfire was piloted by Kazimierz Kosinski from the No. 302 Polish Fighter Squadron who was killed in action on a shipping reconnaissance mission that day.

=== Group commander ===
On 24 June 1942, Leie was officially appointed as Gruppenkommandeur (group commander) of I. Gruppe of JG 2. Leie thus succeeded Hauptmann Ignaz Prestele in this capacity who had been killed in action on 4 May 1942. He saw action in the air battle of the Dieppe Raid on 19 August and claimed a Spitfire shot down 5 km (3.1 mi) north of Dieppe. This was his last claim on the Western Front. He was then shot down and wounded, bailing out of his Focke-Wulf Fw 190 A-2 (Werknummer 0326—factory number) 12 km (7.5 mi) southwest of Abbeville.

His injuries required hospitalization. Leie returned to his unit on 2 October 1942. During his convalescence, Oberleutnant Christian Eickhoff temporarily led I. Gruppe. On 13 August, Sperrle had approved Leie's preferential promotion to Hauptmann (captain). The Gruppe saw relatively little action in October. In fear of an Allied invasion on the French Mediterranean coast, I. Gruppe was ordered to Marseille-Marignane airfield on 8 November. There, it was tasked with providing fighter protection over the coastal area. Without engaging in aerial combat, the Gruppe stayed in Southern France until the end of 1942.

=== Eastern Front ===
In January 1943, Leie transferred as Gruppenkommandeur to I. Gruppe of JG 51, based on the Eastern Front. Command of I. Gruppe of JG 2 was then given to Major Helmut Bolz. Leie had received the transfer-order on 6 January and arrived at his new unit on 17 January which at the time was based at Isotscha near Nevel. That day, Leie's predecessor as Gruppenkommandeur, Oberleutnant Rudolf Busch, was killed in action when he collided in mid-air with Geschwaderkommodore Oberstleutnant (Lieutenant Colonel) Karl-Gottfried Nordmann. Busch had temporarily led the Gruppe after its former commander, Hauptmann Heinrich Krafft, had been killed on 14 December 1942. At the time of Leie's arrival on the Eastern Front, Soviet and German forces were engaged in the Battle for Velikiye Luki and in the Battles of Rzhev in the sector of JG 51 area of operation. On 28 January, I. Gruppe was forced to give up its airfield at Isotscha and moved to an airfield west of Oryol. Flying from Oryol, Leie claimed a Mikoyan-Gurevich MiG-3 fighter shot down on 2 February, his first aerial victory on the Eastern Front.

Leie led the Gruppe during the offensive operations leading up to Operation Citadel, which initiated the Battle of Kursk. The battle began on 5 July 1943 with I. Gruppe of JG 51 supporting the German 9th Army in its northern attack on the Kursk salient. For the first days of the operation, I. Gruppe primary task was to provide fighter escort for the bombers of Kampfgeschwader 4, Kampfgeschwader 51 and Kampfgeschwader 53, as well as for the Junkers Ju 87 dive bombers of Sturzkampfgeschwader 1. On the first day of the Zitadelle, Leie claimed his 50th aerial victory, an Il-2 shot down in the vicinity of Maloarkhangelsk.

On 6 November 1943 Leie, by now a Major, recorded his 100th victory. He was the 57th Luftwaffe pilot to achieve the century mark. After a lengthy spell of leave, he returned in late March 1944. On 6 July, during Operation Bagration, he was shot down by Soviet fighters. He baled out over Soviet lines but on descending by parachute, was blown back over German lines. By the end of October 1944, Leie's victory total stood at 117.

=== Wing commander of JG 77 and death ===
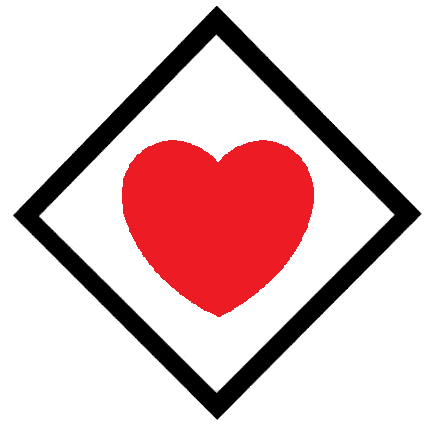
Herzas (Ace of Hearts) emblem of JG 77

On 29 December 1944, Leie was appointed Geschwaderkommodore of Jagdgeschwader 77 (JG 77—77th Fighter Wing). He replaced Major Siegfried Freytag in this function who had temporarily assumed command after Major Johannes Wiese was wounded in combat on 25 December. Freytag continued to lead JG 77 until Leie's arrival with the Geschwader on 15 January 1945. Command of his former I. Gruppe of JG 51 was passed to Hauptmann Günther Schack. On 12 January, the Red Army had launched the Vistula–Oder Offensive on the Eastern Front. The offensive required the Luftwaffe to relocate its forces, defeated Army Group A, taking much of Poland and striking deep within the pre-war borders of Germany. JG 77 was one of the first Luftwaffe fighter units ordered to relocate to the Eastern Front on 19 January.

As Geschwaderkommodore, Leie was ordered to Berlin on 22 January 1945 and attended the meeting with Reichsmarschall Hermann Göring which was later dubbed the Fighter Pilots' Mutiny. This was an attempt to reinstate Generalleutnant Adolf Galland as General der Jagdflieger who had been dismissed for outspokenness regarding the Oberkommando der Luftwaffe (Luftwaffe high command), and had been replaced by Oberst Gordon Gollob. The meeting was held at the Haus der Flieger in Berlin and was attended by a number of high-ranking fighter pilot leaders which included Leie, Günther Lützow, Hannes Trautloft, Hermann Graf, Gerhard Michalski, Helmut Bennemann, Kurt Bühligen and Herbert Ihlefeld, and their antagonist Göring supported by his staff Bernd von Brauchitsch and Karl Koller. The fighter pilots, with Lützow taking the lead as spokesman, criticized Göring and made him personally responsible for the decisions taken which effectively had led to the lost air war over Europe.

On 7 March 1945, Leie claimed his last two aerial victories and was killed in action. At 14:56, he claimed a La-5 shot down. Half an hour later, he claimed a Yakovlev Yak-9 fighter west of Bielitz, present-day Bielsko-Biała, but collided in mid-air with the crashing Yak-9 fighter in his Bf 109 G-14/AS (Werknummer 786329—factory number). He baled out at an altitude of 60 metres (200 feet), too low for his parachute to fully deploy. Posthumously, he was promoted to Oberstleutnant (lieutenant colonel), and nominated for the Knight's Cross of the Iron Cross with Oak Leaves (Ritterkreuz des Eisernen Kreuzes mit Eichenlaub) which was not approved. He was buried at the German war cemetery in Valašské Meziříčí.

== Summary of career ==
=== Aerial victory claims ===
According to US historian David T. Zabecki, Leie was credited with 118 aerial victories. Spick also lists him with 118 aerial victories, 75 on the Eastern Front and 43 on the Western Front, claimed in approximately 500 combat missions and a mission-to-claim ratio of 4.24. Mathews and Foreman, authors of Luftwaffe Aces – Biographies and Victory Claims, researched the German Federal Archives and found records for 121 aerial victory claims, plus one further unconfirmed claim. This figure includes 77 aerial victories on the Eastern Front and 44 over the Western Allies, including one four-engine bomber.

Victory claims were logged to a map-reference (PQ = Planquadrat), for example "PQ 14 West 4911". The Luftwaffe grid map (Jägermeldenetz) covered all of Europe, western Russia and North Africa and was composed of rectangles measuring 15 minutes of latitude by 30 minutes of longitude, an area of about 360 square miles (930 km^{2}). These sectors were then subdivided into 36 smaller units to give a location area 3 km × 4 km (1.9 mi × 2.5 mi) in size.

Chronicle of aerial victories
This and the ♠ (Ace of spades) indicates those aerial victories which made Leie an "ace-in-a-day", a term which designates a fighter pilot who has shot down five or more airplanes in a single day. This and the – (dash) indicates unwitnessed aerial victory claims for which Leie did not receive credit. This and the ? (question mark) indicates information discrepancies listed by Prien, Stemmer, Rodeike, Balke, Bock, Mathews and Foreman.
Claim	Date	Time	Type	Location	Claim	Date	Time	Type	Location
– Stab III. Gruppe of Jagdgeschwader 2 "Richthofen" – Battle of France — 10 May – 25 June 1940
1	14 May 1940	19:20	Blenheim	12 km (7.5 mi) east of Sedan					
– Stab I. Gruppe of Jagdgeschwader 2 "Richthofen" – At the Channel and over England — 26 June 1940 – 21 June 1941
2	5 October 1940	15:58	Hurricane	south of Bournemouth					
– Stab of Jagdgeschwader 2 "Richthofen" – At the Channel and over England — 26 June 1940 – 21 June 1941
3	29 October 1940	15:29	Hurricane	Portsmouth	8	7 November 1940	15:25	Hurricane	south of Portsmouth
4	5 November 1940	14:35	Hurricane	northeast of the Isle of Portland	9	7 November 1940	15:25	Hurricane	south of Portsmouth
5	5 November 1940	14:40	Spitfire	northeast of Portland	10	10 November 1940	15:43	Spitfire	east of Portland
6	6 November 1940	15:35	Hurricane	Southampton	11	28 November 1940	15:17	Spitfire	south of the Isle of Wight
7	6 November 1940	15:37	Hurricane	Southampton					
– Stab of Jagdgeschwader 2 "Richthofen" – On the Western Front — 22 June – 31 December 1941
12	22 June 1941	16:10	Spitfire	Arques	22	10 August 1941	14:25	Hurricane	14 km (8.7 mi) northeast of Calais
13	24 June 1941	20:55	Spitfire	east of Calais	23	12 August 1941	12:54	Spitfire	northwest of Saint-Omer
14	24 June 1941	20:57	Spitfire	north of Calais	24	12 August 1941	13:08	Spitfire	15 km (9.3 mi) southeast of Dover
—	25 June 1941	16:30	Spitfire	northeast of Boulogne	25	12 August 1941	19:28	Spitfire	12 km (7.5 mi) south of Dungeness
15	6 July 1941	14:35	Spitfire	30 km (19 mi) north of Grand-Fort-Philippe	26	21 August 1941	15:15	Spitfire	south of Étaples
16♠	23 July 1941	13:21	Spitfire	10 km (6.2 mi) east of Calais	27	13 October 1941	14:40	Spitfire	15 km (9.3 mi) west of Boulogne
17♠	23 July 1941	13:28	Spitfire	northwest of Calais	28	13 October 1941	14:43	Spitfire	25 km (16 mi) west of Boulogne
18♠	23 July 1941	20:35	Spitfire	west of Hesdin	29	13 October 1941	15:40	Spitfire	5 km (3.1 mi) west-northwest of Étaples
19♠	23 July 1941	20:39	Spitfire	west of Hesdin	30	8 November 1941	12:30	Spitfire	Baie de Somme
20♠	23 July 1941	20:43	Spitfire	southwest of Berck	31	8 December 1941	15:45	Spitfire	35 km (22 mi) west of Boulogne
21♠	23 July 1941	20:47	Spitfire	20 km (12 mi) west of Berck	32	30 December 1941	15:30	Halifax	PQ 14 West 4911 vicinity of Brest
– Stab of Jagdgeschwader 2 "Richthofen" – On the Western Front — 1 January – May 1942
33	8 January 1942	10:09	Hudson	PQ 14 West 6927	37	1 May 1942	19:40	Spitfire	northwest of Cap Gris-Nez
34	26 January 1942	13:40	Spitfire	PQ 14 West 6042 off Rame Head	38	19 May 1942	15:23	Spitfire	40 km (25 mi) north of Fécamp
35	2 February 1942	19:05	Beaufort	18 km (11 mi) north-northwest of Brignogan-Plages	39	2 June 1942	17:45	Spitfire	20 km (12 mi) south-southeast of Eastbourne
— (Note: According to Mathews and Foreman this claim is listed as Leie's 36th aerial victory. However, Prien, Stemmer, Rodeike and Bock consider this claim unconfirmed.)	25 April 1942	16:45? (Note: According to Mathews and Foreman claimed at 16:43.)	Spitfire	25 km (16 mi) west of Le Crotoy	40	3 June 1942	16:39	Spitfire	40 km (25 mi) northwest of Le Havre
36	1 May 1942	19:37	Spitfire	15 km (9.3 mi) west-northwest of Wissant	41	5 June 1942	15:35	Spitfire	50 km (31 mi) northwest of Fécamp
– Stab I. Gruppe of Jagdgeschwader 2 "Richthofen" – On the Western Front — June – 31 December 1942
42	26 June 1942	17:44	Spitfire	50 km (31 mi) north of Fécamp	43	19 August 1942	11:50	Spitfire	5 km (3.1 mi) north of Dieppe
– Stab I. Gruppe of Jagdgeschwader 51 "Mölders" – Eastern Front — February 1943
44	2 February 1943	14:05	MiG-3	PQ 7376					
– Stab I. Gruppe of Jagdgeschwader 51 "Mölders" – Eastern Front — 4 February 1943 – 31 December 1943
45	4 February 1943	12:10	Il-2	PQ 35 Ost 63632, Kosakowa; 25 km (16 mi) east-northeast of Maloarkhangelsk	75	7 September 1943	12:29	LaGG-3	PQ 35 Ost 35893; 25 km (16 mi) west-southwest of Kirov
46	5 February 1943	14:25	Il-2	PQ 35 Ost 73551, east of Tatrino; 25 km (16 mi) west-southwest of Livny	76	9 September 1943	15:40	La-5	PQ 35 Ost 34235; 25 km (16 mi) southeast of Kirov
47	16 March 1943	11:27	Pe-2	PQ 35 Ost 44593, north of Bryansk; 10 km (6.2 mi) northeast of Bryansk	77	10 September 1943	13:53	Il-2 m.H. (Note: The "m.H." refers to an Ilyushin Il-2 with rear gunner (mit Heckschütze).)	PQ 35 Ost 44712; 20 km (12 mi) west-northwest of Bryansk
48? (Note: This claim is not listed by Mathews and Foreman.)	4 June 1943	19:35	Pe-2	5 km (3.1 mi) west of Bokowoje	78	10 September 1943	13:56	Il-2 m.H.	PQ 35 Ost 44728; 10 km (6.2 mi) west of Bryansk
49	8 June 1943	19:35	Yak-7	PQ 35 Ost 53423, Kromy; 5 km (3.1 mi) west of Kromy	79	10 September 1943	14:00	Il-2 m.H.	PQ 35 Ost 44766; 15 km (9.3 mi) south of Bryansk
50	5 July 1943	18:44	Il-2	PQ 35 Ost 63534 vicinity of Maloarkhangelsk	80	11 September 1943	11:10	Yak-7	PQ 35 Ost 44229; 25 km (16 mi) north of Zhizdra
51	11 July 1943	19:00	P-39	PQ 35 Ost 63572; 20 km (12 mi) south-southeast of Trosna	81	11 September 1943	11:32	Il-2 m.H.	PQ 35 Ost 44769; 15 km (9.3 mi) south of Bryansk
52	13 July 1943	13:44	Il-2	PQ 35 Ost 63255; 10 km (6.2 mi) south of Zalegoshch	82	15 September 1943	09:34	La-5	PQ 35 Ost 35348; 15 km (9.3 mi) northwest of Yelnya
53	13 July 1943	13:48	Il-2	PQ 35 Ost 64894; 25 km (16 mi) east-northeast of Zalegoshch	83	15 September 1943	13:20	Il-2 m.H.	PQ 35 Ost 35378; 10 km (6.2 mi) west of Yelnya
54	13 July 1943	14:05	Il-2	PQ 35 Ost 63213 vicinity of Zalegoshch	84	15 September 1943	13:25	La-5	PQ 35 Ost 25465; 20 km (12 mi) west of Yelnya
55	13 July 1943	18:32	Yak-1	PQ 35 Ost 64878; 10 km (6.2 mi) north of Zalegoshch	85	15 September 1943	13:40	Pe-2	PQ 35 Ost 25466; 20 km (12 mi) west-northwest of Yelnya
56	29 July 1943	16:28	LaGG-3	PQ 35 Ost 54653, southwest of Bolkhov; 25 km (16 mi) east-northeast of Belyov	86	17 September 1943	11:32	Yak-9	PQ 35 Ost 35511; 15 km (9.3 mi) south-southwest of Yelnya
57	29 July 1943	16:57	Il-2	PQ 35 Ost 54648, southwest of Bolkhov; 20 km (12 mi) northeast of Znamenskoye	87	4 October 1943	15:51	Yak-9	PQ 35 Ost 15318; 25 km (16 mi) northwest of Krassnyj
58	29 July 1943	18:55	Il-2	PQ 35 Ost 64755; 20 km (12 mi) northeast of Orel	88	5 October 1943	10:46	Yak-9	PQ 35 Ost 06891 vicinity of Gorki
59	31 July 1943	11:49	La-5	PQ 35 Ost 64548; 10 km (6.2 mi) west of Telchje	89	5 October 1943	10:47	Yak-9	PQ 35 Ost 06868; 15 km (9.3 mi) northeast of Liozna
60	1 August 1943	10:10	Su-2 (Seversky)	PQ 35 Ost 53522; 5 km (3.1 mi) southeast of Dmitrowsk-Orlowskiy	90	5 October 1943	10:48	Yak-9	PQ 35 Ost 06833; 20 km (12 mi) north-northeast of Liozna
61	1 August 1943	18:45	Yak-1	PQ 35 Ost 53446; 15 km (9.3 mi) south-southeast of Sockowo	91	5 October 1943	15:19	La-5	PQ 35 Ost 15378; 20 km (12 mi) west of Krassnyj
62	2 August 1943	10:05	Pe-2	PQ 35 Ost 53528; 5 km (3.1 mi) southeast of Dmitrowsk-Orlowskiy	92	6 October 1943	12:08	LaGG-3	PQ 35 Ost 06152; 25 km (16 mi) southeast of Nevel
63	4 August 1943	16:59	La-5	PQ 35 Ost 53355; 20 km (12 mi) southwest of Sockowo	93	6 October 1943	15:42	Pe-2	PQ 35 Ost 06219
64	6 August 1943	16:59	Il-2	PQ 35 Ost 54599; 10 km (6.2 mi) north of Znamenskoye	94	15 October 1943	07:53	Yak-9	PQ 35 Ost 15617; 15 km (9.3 mi) southeast of Krassnyj
65	7 August 1943	08:20? (Note: According to Mathews and Foreman claimed at 14:00.)	LaGG-3	PQ 35 Ost 54762; 10 km (6.2 mi) south of Znamenskoye	95	20 October 1943	15:20	Yak-9	PQ 35 Ost 03876; 40 km (25 mi) south-southeast of Rechytsa
66	7 August 1943	14:00? (Note: According to Mathews and Foreman claimed at 14:06.)	Il-2 m.H.	PQ 35 Ost 54733 vicinity of Znamenskoye	96	22 October 1943	11:44	Yak-9	PQ 35 Ost 02246; 45 km (28 mi) northwest of Ossijaki
67	7 August 1943	14:05	Il-2 m.H.	PQ 35 Ost 54738 vicinity of Znamenskoye	97	22 October 1943	11:49	Yak-9	PQ 35 Ost 02227; 40 km (25 mi) northwest of Ossijaki
68	8 August 1943	16:32	Il-2 m.H.	PQ 35 Ost 35423; 40 km (25 mi) north-northwest of Spas-Demensk	98	23 October 1943	15:29	Yak-9	PQ 35 Ost 05463; 30 km (19 mi) east-northeast of Orsha
69	8 August 1943	16:41	Il-2 m.H.	PQ 35 Ost 35491; 20 km (12 mi) north-northwest of Spas-Demensk	99	29 October 1943	12:24	Il-2 m.H.	PQ 35 Ost 05451; 15 km (9.3 mi) southwest of Orsha
70	8 August 1943	16:45	Il-2 m.H.	PQ 35 Ost 35636; 10 km (6.2 mi) northwest of Spas-Demensk	100	6 November 1943	15:00	La-5	PQ 35 Ost 01754; 10 km (6.2 mi) southwest of Vasilikov
71	8 August 1943	16:46	Il-2 m.H.	PQ 35 Ost 45514; 10 km (6.2 mi) north of Spas-Demensk	101	6 November 1943	15:03	Il-2 m.H.	PQ 35 Ost 01756; 10 km (6.2 mi) southwest of Vasilikov
72	12 August 1943	12:50	La-5	PQ 35 Ost 51574 vicinity of Kirikowka	102	6 November 1943	15:05	Il-2 m.H.	PQ 35 Ost 01738; 10 km (6.2 mi) east of Vasilikov
73	12 August 1943	13:25	La-5	PQ 35 Ost 51387 vicinity of Slawgorod	103	6 November 1943	15:15	La-5	PQ 35 Ost 01677; 20 km (12 mi) south-southeast of Kiev
74	13 August 1943	16:55	La-5	PQ 35 Ost 50289; 20 km (12 mi) west of Merefa					
– Stab I. Gruppe of Jagdgeschwader 51 "Mölders" – Eastern Front — 1 January – 31 December 1944
104	29 March 1944	12:37	Yak-7	PQ 35 Ost N/04457; 25 km (16 mi) southwest of Tschaussy	111	9 October 1944	13:01? (Note: According to Mathews and Foreman claimed at 13:03.)	Yak-9	PQ 25 Ost N/26868; 20 km (12 mi) southeast of Tauroggen
105	1 April 1944	12:16? (Note: According to Mathews and Foreman claimed at 12:26.)	Yak-9	PQ 35 Ost N/04593; 25 km (16 mi) south-southeast of Stara Bychow	112	9 October 1944	16:00	Il-2 m.H.	PQ 25 Ost N/26872; 25 km (16 mi) east-northeast of Neusiedel
106	8 April 1944	09:30	Yak-9	PQ 25 Ost N/42688; 10 km (6.2 mi) north of Kovel	113	13 October 1944	13:36	Pe-2	PQ 25 Ost N/25312; 10 km (6.2 mi) east of Neusiedel
107	4 September 1944	17:19	Il-2 m.H.	PQ 25 Ost N/14871; 10 km (6.2 mi) south of Ostroleka	114	14 October 1944	15:12	Il-2 m.H.	PQ 25 Ost N/16624; 15 km (9.3 mi) east of Laschon
108	5 September 1944	16:14	Yak-7	PQ 25 Ost N/13344; 20 km (12 mi) east of Nasielsk	115	14 October 1944	15:13	Il-2 m.H.	PQ 25 Ost N/16655; 15 km (9.3 mi) east-southeast of Laschon
109	5 September 1944	16:17	Il-2 m.H.	PQ 25 Ost N/13347; 20 km (12 mi) east of Nasielsk	116	14 October 1944	15:42	Il-2 m.H.	PQ 25 Ost N/16176; 15 km (9.3 mi) north of Memel
110	6 September 1944	15:02	Il-2 m.H.	PQ 25 Ost N/13348; 20 km (12 mi) east of Nasielsk	117	16 October 1944	13:05	Yak-9	PQ 25 Ost N/25621; 15 km (9.3 mi) east-southeast of Trakehnen
– Stab of Jagdgeschwader 77 – Defense of the Reich on the Eastern Front — January – May 1945
118	14 February 1945	16:13	Il-2		120	7 March 1945	14:56	La-5	
119	20 February 1945	16:29	La-5		121	7 March 1945	15:30	Yak-9	

=== Awards ===
- Iron Cross (1939) 2nd and 1st Class
- German Cross in Gold on 20 October 1942 as Oberleutnant in the I./Jagdgeschwader 2
- Knight's Cross of the Iron Cross on 1 August 1941 as Oberleutnant and pilot in the Stab of I./Jagdgeschwader 2 "Richthofen" (Note: According to Scherzer as pilot in the Stab/Jagdgeschwader 2 "Richthofen".)

== Notes ==
Military offices
Preceded by Major Siegfried Freytag	Commander of Jagdgeschwader 77 Herz As; 29 December 1944 – 7 March 1945	Succeeded by Major Siegfried Freytag
