= Jagdgeschwader 77 =

- Unit insignia
- Active: 1939–45
- Country: Nazi Germany
- Branch: Luftwaffe
- Type: Fighter Aircraft
- Role: Air superiority
- Size: Air Force Wing
- Nickname: Herz As
- Engagements: Western Front: Battle of France; Battle of Britain; Eastern Front (World War II): German-Soviet air war 22 June 1941; Operation Barbarossa

Commanders
- Notable commanders: Gordon Gollob; Johannes Steinhoff

Jagdgeschwader 77 (JG 77) Herz As ("Ace of Hearts") was a Luftwaffe fighter wing during World War II. It served in all the German theaters of war, from Western Europe to the Eastern Front, and from the high north in Norway to the Mediterranean.

All three gruppen (groups) within the unit operated variants of the Messerschmitt Bf 109. II. Gruppe was the only German unit entirely equipped, albeit only during November–December 1943, with the Macchi C.205, a highly regarded Italian fighter.

== Formation ==
Initially, JG 77 was created with two Gruppen (groups) and without a Geschwaderstab (headquarters unit). I. Gruppe of JG 77 was created from IV. Gruppe of Jagdgeschwader 132 (JG 132—132nd Fighter Wing), which had become I. Gruppe of Jagdgeschwader 331 (JG 331—331st Fighter Wing) on 3 November 1938 before it was renamed to I. Gruppe of JG 77 on 1 May 1939.

II. Gruppe of JG 77 was derived from one of the oldest units of the Luftwaffe and based on the Küstenjagdgruppe (Coastal Fighter Group) named I./136. On 1 October 1936, this unit was relabeled and became I. Gruppe of Jagdgeschwader 136 (JG 136—136th Fighter Wing).

It was renamed to II. Gruppe of Jagdgeschwader 333 (JG 333—333rd Fighter Wing) on 1 November 1938. It became II. Gruppe of JG 77 on 1 May 1939. The Geschwaderstab was formed on 1 October 1939 at Neumünster and its first Geschwaderkommodore (wing commander) was Oberstleutnant Eitel Roediger von Manteuffel.

III. Gruppe of JG 77 was formed on the Trägerjagdgruppe (Carrier Fighter Group) with the designation II./186 (T), (Note: The suffix 'T' denotes Träger (carrier) in German use.) at the time based at Trondheim, Norway. I./JG 77 was reorganized on 21 November 1940 into IV./JG 51 and a new I./JG 77 was established. In January 1942 I./JG 77 was transferred to I./JG 5 and a new I./JG 77 was created. In April 1942 I. Staffel was transferred to Romania and designated the defence unit for the Ploieşti oil fields at Mizil. This staffel was redesignated I./JG 4 in August 1942.

== World War II ==
I./JG 77 took part in the invasion of Poland on 1 September 1939, while attached to Luftflotte 3. In April 1940, JG 77 took part in Operation Weserübung, the invasion of Denmark and Norway. After the invasion of France, I. Gruppe supported 10th Air Corps (under Luftflotte 5) in operations against the United Kingdom from bases in Norway. While stationed in Norway and Denmark in 1940 II./JG 77 claimed some 79 victories, for 6 pilots killed, before leaving in November 1940 for defence duties in Brest, France. In May 1941 II. and III./JG 77 were used in support of the invasion of Greece and the paratroop assault on Crete.

Following the operations in Crete, JG 77 was withdrawn to Romania. III. Gruppe was converted to the new Bf 109F. As Operation Barbarossa, the Axis invasion of the Soviet Union, started on 22 June 1941, II. and III. Gruppe plus Stab supported the advance East as part of Army Group South, while I. Gruppe served on the Finnish front. The Jagdgeschwader scored quickly. On 25 June, Walter Hoeckner of 6./JG 77 shot down 8 of 10 Tupolev SB claimed by III./JG 77. On 26 June, Oblt. Kurt Ubben shot down 4 SB and Ofw. Reinhold Schmetzer shot down 5 SB. Between 22 June to December 1941, the unit and its attachment I.(J)/LG 2, destroyed 1,166 Soviet aircraft, in return for 52 losses in aerial combat and two aircraft on the ground.

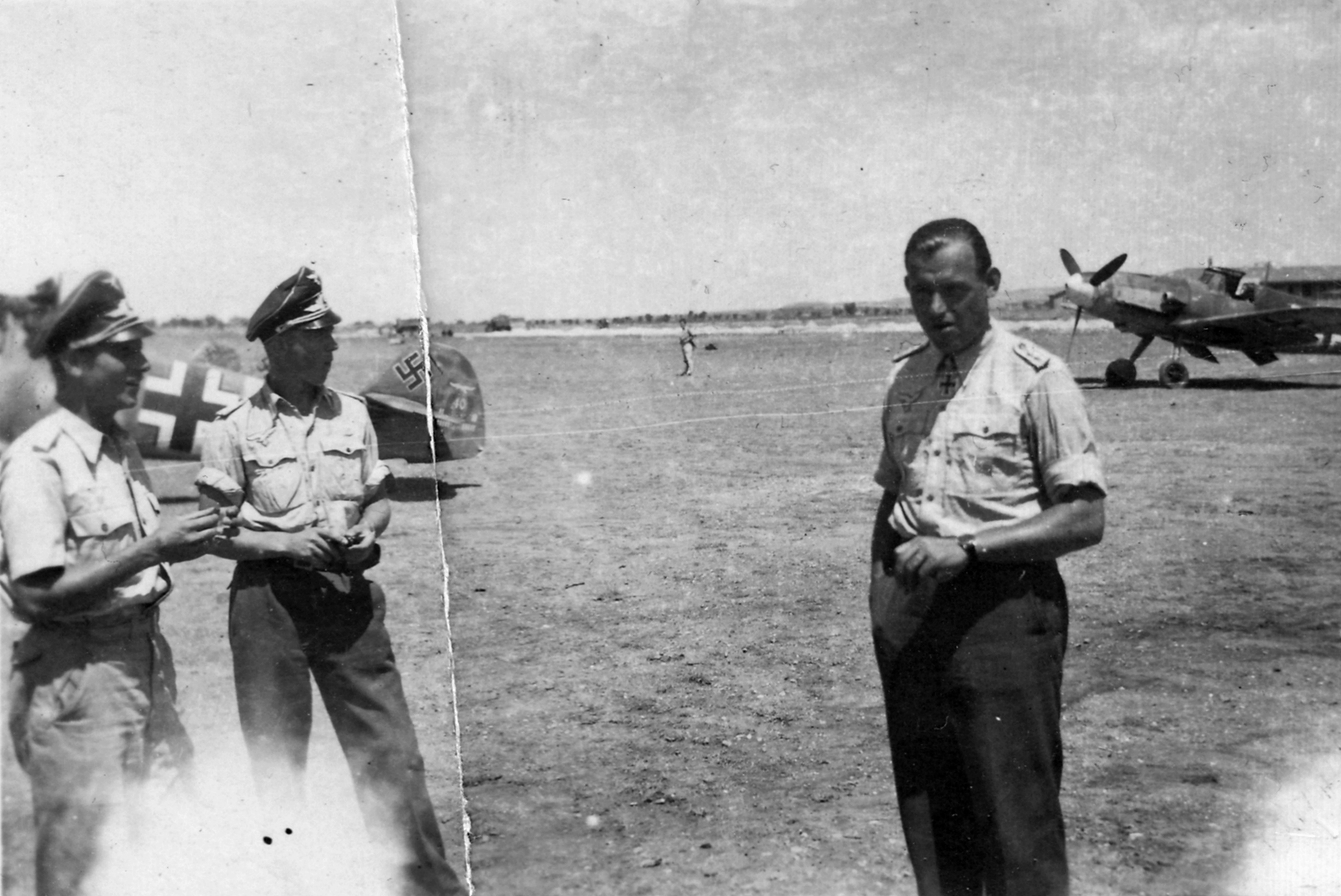
German Luftwaffe ace Oskar-Heinrich ("Heinz) Bär (right) the Stab I./JG 77. The photo was probably taken at Comiso, Italy, in July 1942.

In January 1942, I. Gruppe, which was still based in Norway, was reorganized into I. Gruppe/JG 5. The entire JG 77, with a newly created I. Gruppe, was then transferred south to the Mediterranean area from June - December 1942. JG 77 saw extensive action against the Desert Air Force fighter-bombers. Total Allied air superiority led to the JG 77 bases in Tunisia coming under constant air attack, and a large number of Bf 109's were written off on the ground. Following the death in late March 1943 of the unit's commander Joachim Müncheberg during a mid-air collision during combat, Oberstleutnant Johannes Steinhoff was appointed commander of the unit.

While I. and II./JG 77 returned to Germany to re-equip, III./JG 77 remained in Italy, based at Foggia, north-east of Naples and flying sorties into Sardinia and Sicily. In mid-June, I./JG 77 flew into Sciacca on Sicily.

The Geschwader, as part of 2nd Air Corps, was then stationed in Italy and Sicily. During the rest of 1943 and 1944 JG 77 was stationed on the Southern Front, mainly in the Balkans, Sardinia and Italy, but also in Romania. Luftwaffe II.Gruppe of JG 77 operated with requisitioned Macchi C.205Vs, for two months, from October until the end of 1943, in December, when the German unit was re-equipped with new Bf 109s. Thus there are photos of C.205s with black crosses painted over the mid-fuselage Italian white strip markings.

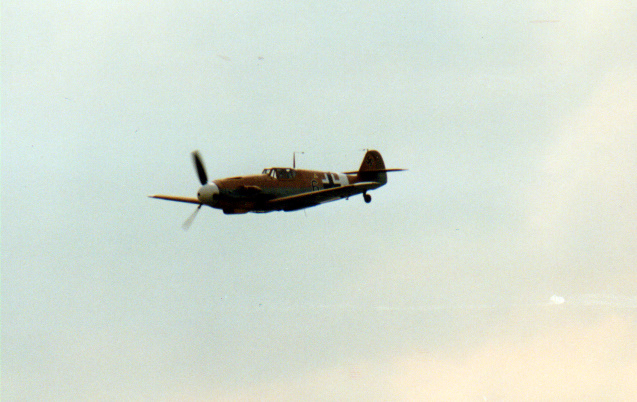
Bf 109G-2/trop "Black 6", formerly of JG 77, 1996, prior to its crash

In 1945, JG 77 was relocated to Germany to help with the Reichsverteidigung (Defense of the Reich). In the last months of the war, part of JG 77 was employed against the Soviet Air Force in Silesia. In this area on 7 March 1945 Kommodore Major Erich Leie, a 118-kill ace, was killed in combat with Yak-9 fighters.

== Commanding officers ==
=== Geschwaderkommodore ===
• Oberstleutnant Eitel Roediger von Manteuffel	1 October 1939	–	22 December 1940
• Major Bernhard Woldenga	2 January 1941	–	June 1941
• Major Gotthard Handrick	June 1941	–	May 1942
• Major Gordon M. Gollob	16 May 1942	–	30 September 1942
• Major Joachim Müncheberg	1 October 1942	–	23 March 1943
• Oberstleutnant Johannes Steinhoff	1 April 1943	–	November 1944
• Major Johannes Wiese	1 December 1944	–	25 December 1944
• Major Siegfried Freytag (acting)	26 December 1944	–	15 January 1945
• Major Erich Leie	29 December 1944	–	7 March 1945
• Major Siegfried Freytag (acting)	7 March 1945	–	1 April 1945
• Major Fritz Losigkeit	1 April 1945	–	8 May 1945

=== Gruppenkommandeure ===
==== I. Gruppe of JG 77 ====
First formation, IV.(l)/JG 132 was renamed to I./JG 331 on 3 November 1938 which then became the I./JG 77 on 1 May 1939.

• Oberstleutnant Theo Osterkamp	1 July 1938	–	July 1938
• Hauptmann Johannes Janke	July 1938	–	18 February 1942

On 3 November 1940, I. Gruppe leaves JG 77 and becomes IV. Gruppe of Jagdgeschwader 51. A new I. Gruppe was formed from I.(Jagd) Gruppe of Lehrgeschwader 2 on 6 January 1942.

• Major Hanns Trübenbach	1 October 1937	–	18 August 1940
• Hauptmann Bernhard Mielke	21 August 1940	–	30 August 1940 †
• Hauptmann Herbert Ihlefeld	30 August 1940	–	11 May 1942
• Major Heinz Bär	11 May 1942	–	6 August 1943
• Oberleutnant Armin Köhler (acting)	31 July 1943	–	19 August 1943
• Hauptmann Lutz-Wilhelm Burckhardt	19 August 1943	–	30 November 1943
• Hauptmann Theo Lindemann	30 November 1943	–	28 August 1944
• Hauptmann Armin Köhler (acting)	May 1944	–	13 June 1944
• Hauptmann Lothar Baumann	1 August 1944	–	24 December 1944
unknown squadron leader	25 December 1944	–	10 January 1945
• Hauptmann Joachim Deicke	10 Januar 1945	–	17 April 1945
• Hauptmann Heinz Grosser	17 April 1945	–	8 May 1945

==== II. Gruppe of JG 77 ====
Formed from I./136 which was renamed to II./JG 333 on 1 November 1938 and then became the II./JG 77 on 1 May 1939.

• Major Hermann Edert	1 September 1936	–	29 September 1937
• Oberstleutnant Carl-August Schumacher	29 September 1937	–	30 November 1939
• Major Hilmer von Bülow-Bothkamp	30 November 1939	–	31 March 1940
• Hauptmann Karl Hentschel	31 March 1940	–	9 September 1940
• Hauptmann Franz-Heinz Lange	9 September 1940	–	23 April 1941 †
• Hauptmann Helmut Henz	23 April 1941	–	25 May 1941 †
• Major Anton Mader	26 May 1941	–	7 March 1943
• Oberleutnant Heinz Dudeck (acting)	7 March 1943	–	13 March 1943
• Major Siegfried Freytag	13 March 1943	–	3 April 1945
• Hauptmann Emil Omert (acting)	29 January 1944	–	31 March 1944
• Major Armin Köhler	4 April 1945	–	8 May 1945

==== III. Gruppe of JG 77 ====
Formed from II.(T)/186 and was renamed to III./JG 77 on 5 July 1939.

• Major Walter Hagen	1939	–	15 September 1939
• Major Heinrich Seeliger	15 September 1939	–	14 October 1940
• Major Alexander von Winterfeldt	October 1940	–	2 August 1941
• unknown (acting)	3 August 1941	–	4 September 1941
• Major Kurt Ubben	5 September 1941	–	10 March 1944
• Hauptmann Karl Bresoschek (acting)	10 March 1944	–	3 April 1944
• Hauptmann Emil Omert	3 April 1944	–	24 April 1944 †
• Hauptmann Karl Bresoschek	24 April 1944	–	31 July 1944
• Oberleutnant Erhard Niese (acting)	6 June 1944	–	July 1944
• Major Armin Köhler	August 1944	–	April 1945
