= Anton Mader =

German World War II flying ace (1913–1984)

- Born: 7 January 1913; Kaštel Novi, Kingdom of Dalmatia, Austria-Hungary
- Died: 19 February 1984 (aged 71); Vienna, Austria
- Military career
- Allegiance: Nazi Germany; Austria
- Branch: Luftwaffe; Austrian Air Force
- Service years: 1933–1945; 1955–1973
- Rank: Oberstleutnant (Wehrmacht); Brigadier (Bundesheer)
- Commands: II./JG 77, JG 11, JG 54
- Conflicts: World War II
- Awards: Knight's Cross of the Iron Cross; Grand Decoration of Honour for Services to the Republic of Austria

Anton Mader (7 January 1913 – 19 February 1984) was a German pilot during World War II. He claimed 86 victories and was a recipient of the Knight's Cross of the Iron Cross. He commanded the fighter wing Jagdgeschwader 54 in 1944.

== Early life and career ==
Mader was born on 7 January 1913 in Castelnuovo, at the time in the Kingdom of Dalmatia of Austria-Hungary, present-day Kaštel Novi in Dalmatia, Croatia. He was the son of an Imperial and Royal Kapellmeister, a leader of a musical ensemble, who later served in the Austrian Armed Forces.

In 1933, Mader was conscripted into the Austrian Armed Forces serving with Alpenjägerregiment 10, the 10th Alpine Mountain Regiment. He then attended the military academy at Enns and the Theresian Military Academy at Wiener Neustadt. Promoted to Leutnant (second lieutenant), he was transferred to Fliegerregiment 2, the 2nd Flight Regiment of the Austrian Air Force. Following the Anschluss in March 1938, the forced incorporation of Austria into Nazi Germany, Mader was transferred to the Luftwaffe (the Nazi German Air Force) holding the rank of Oberleutnant (first lieutenant). On 1 April, a newly formed I. Gruppe (1st group) of Jagdgeschwader 138 (JG 138—138th Fighter Wing) stationed in Wien-Aspern also referred to as the "Wiener-Jagdgruppe" ("Vienna fighter group") was created, largely staffed with former Austrian Air Force personnel. There, Mader was made Staffelkapitän (squadron leader) of 3. Staffel (3rd squadron) of JG 138. On 1 May 1939, his unit I. Gruppe of JG 138 was re-designated and became I. Gruppe of Jagdgeschwader 76 (JG 76—76th Fighter Wing). Initially equipped with the Fiat CR.32, 3. Staffel received the Messerschmitt Bf 109 B. The Gruppe was reequipped with the Bf 109 E-1 and E-3 in 1939. That year, command of 3. Staffel transferred to Oberleutnant Franz Eckerle.

== World War II ==
World War II in Europe began on Friday 1 September 1939 when German forces invaded Poland. In preparation of the invasion, I. Gruppe of JG 76 had been moved to an airfield at Stubendorf, present-day Izbicko in Poland, on 17 August 1939 and supported the German advance on the central and southern sectors of the front.

On 24 September 1940, Mader was appointed Staffelkapitän of 1. Staffel of Jagdgeschwader 2 "Richthofen" (JG 2—2nd Fighter Wing). He succeeded Oberleutnant Otto Bertram who was transferred.

The Gruppenkommandeur of II. Gruppe of JG 77, Hauptmann Helmut Henz, was killed in action on 25 May 1941. In consequence, Mader was given command of the Gruppe. Command of 1. Staffel of JG 2 was given to Leutnant Ulrich Adrian. In July 1941, SS-Gruppenführer Reinhard Heydrich briefly served in II. Gruppe under the command of Mader.

=== Eastern Front ===
In preparation for Operation Barbarossa, the German invasion of the Soviet Union, II. Gruppe was moved to Bucharest and was located in the sector of Heeresgruppe Süd (Army Group South). II. Gruppe arrived in Bucharest on 15 June. Five days later, III. Gruppe moved to Roman. That evening, the pilots and ground crews were briefed of the upcoming invasion of the Soviet Union, which opened the Eastern Front.

On 7 November 1942, II. Gruppe received orders to immediately transfer to the Mediterranean theater.

=== North Africa ===
The first elements of II. Gruppe arrived in North Africa on 5 December where it was based at Zarzur airfield, approximately 15 km (9.3 mi) west of Tripoli. Mader's Gruppenstab (headquarters unit) arrived in North Africa on 13 December, initially based at Tripoli and then moved to Zarzur. On 7 March 1943, Mader left North Africa and JG 77 for a short vacation prior to taking on a new assignment.

=== Wing commander ===
On 1 April 1943, Mader was tasked with the formation of the newly created Jagdgeschwader 11 (JG 11—11th Fighter Wing) and became its first Geschwaderkommodore (wing commander). At first, Major Johannes Steinhoff had been considered for this position. Command of II. Gruppe of JG 77 was given to Hauptmann Siegfried Freytag who had already severed as acting commander since 7 March. Mader claimed his first aerial victory in defense of the Reich on 19 May. That day, the United States Army Air Forces (USAAF) attacked Kiel and Flensburg. That day, JG 11 claimed seven Boeing B-17 Flying Fortress bombers shot down, including one by Mader, for no losses of their own. Two days later, the USAAF VIII Bomber Command, later renamed to Eighth Air Force, attacked Wilhelmshaven and Emden in northern Germany. German radar spotted the approaching bombers in an area north of Terschelling. Defending against this attack, Mader claimed a B-17 bomber shot down. On 26 July, USAAF bombers attacked Hamburg for the second time while second formation headed for the Continental AG rubber factory in Hanover. The bombers came under attack by JG 11 in the area of Husum after they had dropped their bombs on Hanover between 12:00 and 12:43. In this aerial battle over sea, Mader claimed a B-17 shot down.

On 23 October, Reichsmarschall Hermann Göring, the commander-in-chief of the Luftwaffe, visited Jagdgeschwader 1 (JG 1—1st Fighter Wing) at Deelen Air Base near Arnhem. In consequence, all the pilots of JG 1 were summoned to the airfield. Mader and Major Hermann Graf, who had recently been appointer Geschwaderkommodore of JG 1 also attended the meeting. En route from Jever, Mader and Graf were nearly shot down by a flight of two de Havilland Mosquitos over the North Sea Coast, while flying in an unarmed Messerschmitt Bf 108. In early November, Mader was relieved of command and sent on vacation. In consequence, command of JG 11 was given to Graf. Replacing Mader with Graf, was a decision not well received by Oberst Max Ibel, the commander of the 2. Jagd-Division (2nd Fighter Division).

Emblem of JG 54

On 28 January 1944, Mader succeeded Oberstleutnant Hubertus von Bonin, who had been killed in action on 15 December 1943, as Geschwaderkommodore of Jagdgeschwader 54 (JG 54—54th Fighter Wing). Mader took command of JG 54 on 15 February. At the time, the Geschwaderstab (headquarters unit) was based at Wesenberg, an airfield near Rakvere in northern Estonia. Here, JG 54 was under control of Luftflotte 1 and subordinated to the 3. Flieger Division (3rd Air Division), supporting German forces fighting in the Battle of Narva.

In the fall Mader fell ill and had to transfer command of JG 54 to Oberst Dietrich Hrabak on 1 October. After hospitalization, Mader attended staff training at the Luftkriegsschule Berlin-Gatow, the air war school in Gatow. Mader was then posted to the staff of the General der Jagdflieger (General of Fighters), an office held by Oberst Gordon Gollob. In late April 1945, Mader, along with Gollob's staff, was taken prisoner of war by US forces in Austria.

== Later life and service ==
Mader was released from captivity in June 1945. He then worked as a courier for the Embassy of the United States in Vienna. In 1955, the Austrian State Treaty re-established Austria as a sovereign state. Mader joined the Austrian Air Force, referred to as the Österreichische Luftstreitkräfte, holding the rank of Oberstleutnant. He served with the Fliegerführungskommando (Air Command) and was promoted to Oberst in the general staff in 1961 and to Brigadier in 1966. Mader died on 19 February 1984 at the age of 71 in Vienna, Austria.

== Summary of career ==
=== Aerial victory claims ===
According to US historian David T. Zabecki, Mader was credited with 86 aerial victories. Spick also lists him with 86 aerial victories, 61 on the Eastern Front and 25 on the Western Front, claimed in an unknown number combat missions. Mathews and Foreman, authors of Luftwaffe Aces — Biographies and Victory Claims, researched the German Federal Archives and found records for 78 aerial victory claims. This figure includes 73 aerial victories on the Eastern Front and five over the Western Allies, including three four-engined heavy bombers.

Victory claims were logged to a map-reference (PQ = Planquadrat), for example "PQ 72263". The Luftwaffe grid map (Jägermeldenetz) covered all of Europe, western Russia and North Africa and was composed of rectangles measuring 15 minutes of latitude by 30 minutes of longitude, an area of about 360 square miles (930 km^{2}). These sectors were then subdivided into 36 smaller units to give a location area 3 km × 4 km (1.9 mi × 2.5 mi) in size.

Chronicle of aerial victories
This and the # (hash mark) indicates those aerial victories listed by Prien, Stemmer, Rodeike and Bock without an explicit sequence number. This and the ? (question mark) indicates information discrepancies listed by Prien, Stemmer, Rodeike, Balke, Bock, Mathews and Foreman.
| Claim | Date | Time | Type | Location | Claim | Date | Time | Type | Location |
– 1. Staffel of Jagdgeschwader 2 "Richthofen" – At the Channel and over England — 26 June 1940 – 21 June 1941
| 1 | 24 September 1940 | 09:45 | Spitfire | east-southeast of London | 2 | 7 October 1940 | 16:57 | Spitfire | 20 km (12 mi) north of Portland |
– II. Gruppe of Jagdgeschwader 77 – Operation Barbarossa — 22 June – 5 December 1941
| # | 2 July 1941 | 17:50 | I-16 | | # | 12 August 1941 | 15:27 | I-16 | |
| # | 6 July 1941 | 12:43 | I-16 | | # | 12 August 1941 | 15:28 | I-16 | |
| # | 11 July 1941 | 17:40 | I-16 | | # | 22 August 1941 | 09:10 | Il-2 | |
| # | 27 July 1941 | 14:53 | MiG-3 | | # | 1 September 1941 | 09:37 | MiG-3 | |
| # | 12 August 1941 | 12:20 | R-10 (Seversky) | | # | 2 September 1941 | 09:55 | R-5 | |
According to Prien, Stemmer, Rodeike and Bock, Mader claimed two undocumented aerial victories in the timeframe 22 August to 5 September 1941. These two claims are not listed by Mathews and Foreman.
| 16 | 6 September 1941 | 14:38 | Il-2 | | 24 | 15 October 1941 | 15:20 | MiG-3 | |
| 17 | 7 September 1941 | 16:35 | I-16 | | 25 | 17 October 1941 | 11:15 | I-16 | |
| 18 | 8 September 1941 | 14:38 | Seversky | | 26 | 19 October 1941 | 15:06 | I-16 | |
| 19 | 10 September 1941 | 15:50 | MiG-3 | | 27 | 21 October 1941 | 15:20 | I-5 | |
| 20 | 20 September 1941 | 11:00 | MiG-3 | | 28 | 21 October 1941 | 15:21 | I-5 | |
| 21 | 6 October 1941 | 11:45 | LaGG-3 | | 29 | 22 October 1941 | 11:45 | R-5 | |
| 22 | 9 October 1941 | 13:30 | V-11 (Il-2) | | 30 | 24 October 1941 | 15:09 | I-15 | |
| 23 | 15 October 1941 | 08:35 | MiG-3 | | | | | | |
– II. Gruppe of Jagdgeschwader 77 – Eastern Front — 17 March – 30 April 1942
| 31 | 19 March 1942 | 15:28 | I-301 (LaGG-3) | | 34 | 24 March 1942 | 12:58 | DB-3 | |
| 32 | 22 March 1942 | 17:30 | I-61 (MiG-3) | | 35 | 27 March 1942 | 16:24 | I-16 | |
| 33 | 23 March 1942 | 11:53 | I-153 | | | | | | |
– II. Gruppe of Jagdgeschwader 77 – Eastern Front — 1 May – 7 November 1942
| 36 | 4 June 1942 | 12:10 | LaGG-3 | | 50 | 25 August 1942 | 17:33 | Il-2? (Note: According to Mathews and Foreman claimed as a Petlyakov Pe-2.) | PQ 72263; 60 km (37 mi) east-northeast of Tim |
| 37 | 8 June 1942 | 16:47 | MiG-1 | PQ 35392, Sevastopol | 51 | 5 September 1942 | 17:17 | Il-2 | PQ 83754; 55 km (34 mi) southeast of Livny |
| 38 | 8 June 1942 | 16:49 | MiG-1 | PQ 35392, Sevastopol | 52 | 11 September 1942 | 16:02 | Il-2 | PQ 92724; 30 km (19 mi) northwest of Sloboda |
| 39 | 14 June 1942 | 14:51 | I-153 | | 53 | 15 September 1942 | 08:45 | LaGG-3 | PQ 92321; 10 km (6.2 mi) north of Voronezh |
| 40 | 14 June 1942 | 14:52 | I-16 | | 54 | 15 September 1942 | 13:08 | LaGG-3 | PQ 92471; 25 km (16 mi) southeast of Voronezh |
| 41 | 6 August 1942 | 18:07 | Douglas DB-7 | PQ 82151; 65 km (40 mi) northwest of Voronezh | 55 | 15 September 1942 | 17:14 | Il-2 | PQ 82432; 15 km (9.3 mi) west-northwest of Voronezh |
| 42 | 6 August 1942 | 18:09 | Douglas DB-7 | PQ 82122; 65 km (40 mi) northwest of Voronezh | 56 | 16 September 1942 | 08:40? (Note: According to Mathews and Foreman claimed at 08:50.) | Douglas DB-7 | PQ 92372; 10 km (6.2 mi) south of Voronezh |
| 43 | 6 August 1942 | 18:11 | Douglas DB-7 | PQ 83763; 65 km (40 mi) south-southwest of Yelets | 57 | 16 September 1942 | 08:51 | Douglas DB-7 | PQ 92372; 20 km (12 mi) south of Voronezh |
| 44 | 12 August 1942 | 09:33 | LaGG-3 | PQ 83881; 50 km (31 mi) north-northwest of Voronezh | 58 | 16 September 1942 | 14:40? (Note: According to Mathews and Foreman claimed at 14:49.) | LaGG-3 | PQ 92381; 10 km (6.2 mi) south-southeast of Voronezh |
| 45 | 12 August 1942 | 16:05? (Note: According to Mathews and Foreman claimed at 16:08.) | LaGG-3 | PQ 83833; 55 km (34 mi) south-southeast of Yelets | 59 | 18 September 1942 | 17:06? (Note: According to Mathews and Foreman claimed at 17:16.) | MiG-1 | PQ 92294; 10 km (6.2 mi) north of Voronezh |
| 46 | 13 August 1942 | 08:06 | Douglas DB-7 | PQ 92332; 20 km (12 mi) east-northeast of Voronezh | 60 | 18 September 1942 | 17:16 | Il-2 | PQ 92312; 20 km (12 mi) northwest of Voronezh |
| 47 | 13 August 1942 | 08:25 | MiG-1 | PQ 92321; 10 km (6.2 mi) north of Voronezh | 61? (Note: This claim is not listed by Mathews and Foreman.) | 18 September 1942 | 17:20 | MiG-1 | PQ 92311 |
| 48 | 23 August 1942 | 14:21 | LaGG-3 | PQ 82892; 20 km (12 mi) southwest of Voronezh | 62 | 22 September 1942 | 15:31 | MiG-1 | PQ 92141; 25 km (16 mi) north of Voronezh |
| 49 | 25 August 1942 | 17:30 | Il-2? | PQ 82452; 15 km (9.3 mi) west-northwest of Voronezh | 63 | 31 October 1942 | 13:55 | Il-2 | PQ 92774; 30 km (19 mi) west-northwest of Sloboda |
– Stab of Jagdgeschwader 11 – Defense of the Reich — 1 April – 31 December 1943
| 64 | 19 May 1943 | 13:23 | B-17 | 2–3 km (1.2–1.9 mi) northeast of Arenberg | 66 | 26 July 1943 | 13:21 | B-17 | 9 km (5.6 mi) west of Papenburg |
| 65 | 21 May 1943 | 12:56 | B-17 | PQ 05 Ost 75/7/2 | | | | | |
– Stab of Jagdgeschwader 54 – Eastern Front — 28 January – 30 September 1944
| 67 | 25 February 1944 | 14:05 | LaGG-3 | PQ 26 Ost 70822; 25 km (16 mi) southwest of Narva | 75 | 17 July 1944 | 16:44 | Il-2 | PQ 25 Ost HR-2/3 |
| 68 | 6 March 1944 | 14:37 | Il-2 | PQ 26 Ost 88162 vicinity of Pskov | 76 | 17 July 1944 | 16:53 | Il-2 | PQ 25 Ost HR-2/6 |
| 69 | 7 March 1944 | 14:04? (Note: According to Mathews and Foreman claimed at 14:34.) | Pe-2 | PQ 25 Ost 69622 north of Dorpat | 77 | 24 July 1944 | 16:36 | Il-2 | PQ 25 Ost TQ-6/4 |
| 70 | 7 March 1944 | 14:07? (Note: According to Mathews and Foreman claimed at 14:37.) | Pe-2 | PQ 25 Ost 79532; Lake Peipus | 78 | 5 August 1944 | 17:00 | La-5 | PQ 25 Ost JH-7/5 |
| 71 | 2 April 1944 | 16:00 | Il-2 | PQ 26 Ost 8836 | 79 | 7 August 1944 | 15:16 | Il-2 | PQ 25 Ost KM-7/9 |
| 72 | 3 April 1944 | 12:35 | Il-2 | PQ 25 Ost 88352 vicinity of Selo | 80 | 7 August 1944 | 15:40 | Il-2 | PQ 25 Ost KN-9/1 |
| 73 | 24 June 1944 | 19:25 | Il-2 | PQ 25 Ost 79551 vicinity of Ostrov | 81 | 15 August 1944 | 17:06 | Il-2 | PQ 25 Ost LK-7/5 |
| 74 | 17 July 1944 | 16:43 | Il-2 | PQ 25 Ost GR-9/1 | 82 | 26 August 1944 | 13:50 | La-5 | PQ 25 Ost JN-6/6 |

=== Awards ===
- Iron Cross (1939) 2nd and 1st Class
- Honour Goblet of the Luftwaffe on 15 September 1941 as Hauptmann and Gruppenkommandeur
- German Cross in Gold on 2 January 1942 as Hauptmann in the II./Jagdgeschwader 77
- Knight's Cross of the Iron Cross on 23 July 1942 as Major and Gruppenkommandeur of the II./Jagdgeschwader 77 (Note: According to Scherzer on 15 July 1942.)
- Decoration of Honour for Services to the Republic of Austria
  - Decoration of Honour in Gold (1964)
  - Grand Decoration of Honour (1970)

== Notes ==
Military offices
| Preceded by none | Commander of Jagdgeschwader 11; 1 April 1943 – 11 November 1943 | Succeeded by Oberstleutnant Hermann Graf |
| Preceded by Major Hubertus von Bonin | Commander of Jagdgeschwader 54 Grünherz; 28 January 1944 – September 1944 | Succeeded by Oberst Dietrich Hrabak |
