= Emil Omert =

German fighter ace and Knight's Cross recipient (1918–1944)

- Born: 15 January 1918; Ginolfs
- Died: 24 April 1944 (aged 26); Finta Mare
- Cause of death: Killed in action
- Military career
- Allegiance: Nazi Germany
- Branch: Luftwaffe
- Rank: Hauptmann (captain)
- Units: JG 3, JG 2, JG 77
- Commands: II./JG 77, III./JG 77
- Conflicts: World War II: Invasion of Yugoslavia; Battle of Crete; Operation Barbarossa; North African Campaign; Defense of the Reich
- Awards: Knight's Cross of the Iron Cross

Emil Omert (15 January 1918 – 24 April 1944) was a German Luftwaffe ace and recipient of the Knight's Cross of the Iron Cross during World War II. Omert claimed 70 aerial victories in over 700 missions, including 125 fighter-bomber and ground attack missions. He also claimed 25 aircraft destroyed on the ground. Emil Omert was awarded the Knight's Cross on 19 March 1942 for 50 victories. The Knight's Cross of the Iron Cross, and its variants were the highest awards in the military and paramilitary forces of Nazi Germany during World War II.

== Career ==
Omert was born on 15 January 1918 in Ginolfs, present-day part of Oberelsbach, at the time in the Kingdom of Bavaria within the German Empire. Following flight training, (Note: Flight training in the Luftwaffe progressed through the levels A1, A2 and B1, B2, referred to as A/B flight training. A training included theoretical and practical training in aerobatics, navigation, long-distance flights and dead-stick landings. The B courses included high-altitude flights, instrument flights, night landings and training to handle the aircraft in difficult situations.) he was posted to the II. Gruppe (2nd group) of Jagdgeschwader 3 (JG 3—3rd Fighter Wing) on 1 February 1940. He was then transferred to the 4. Staffel (4th squadron) of Jagdgeschwader 2 "Richthofen" (JG 2—2nd Fighter Wing).

On 23 March 1940, Omert was promoted to Leutnant (second lieutenant). Two days later, he was posted to II. Gruppe of Jagdggruppe 186 (II./186—186th Fighter Group). This group, also known as the Trägerjagdgruppe (Carrier Fighter Group), was destined to be stationed on the aircraft carrier Graf Zeppelin which was never completed. II./186 (T) initially consisted of two squadrons, 4./186 (T) equipped with the Junkers Ju 87 dive bomber, (Note: The suffix 'T' denotes Träger (carrier) in German use.) and 6./186 (T).

== World War II ==
World War II in Europe had begun on Friday, 1 September 1939, when German forces invaded Poland. Following the decision by Adolf Hitler to halt work on the aircraft carrier Graf Zeppelin, II./186 (T) was redesignated and became the III. Gruppe of Jagdgeschwader 77 (JG 77—77th Fighter Wing). In consequence, Omert's Staffel 6./186 (T) became the 9. Staffel of JG 77 which was headed by Oberleutnant Lorenz Weber. A week later, III. Gruppe was withdrawn from this theater of operations and relocated to Döberitz where it was tasked with fighter protection of Berlin. In November, JG 77 was ordered to the English Channel to continue fighting the Royal Air Force (RAF) in the aftermath of the Battle of Britain. 8. Staffel moved to an airfield at Cherbourg-en-Cotentin on 30 November.

In preparation for Operation Marita, the German invasion of Greece, III. Gruppe of JG 77 was moved to Deta in western Romania on 4 April 1941. Two days later, German forces launched the invasion of Yugoslavia. That day, Omert claimed his first aerial victory on a mission to Belgrade.

=== Eastern Front ===
In preparation for Operation Barbarossa, the German invasion of the Soviet Union, III. Gruppe was moved to Bucharest and was located in the sector of Heeresgruppe Süd (Army Group South). III. Gruppe arrived in Bucharest on 16 June. Four days later, III. Gruppe moved to Roman. On 22 June, German forces launched operation Barbarossa, two days later Omert claimed his first aerial victory on the Eastern Front. On the sixth mission of the day, III. Gruppe flew a combat air patrol along the Prut river near Iași when they encountered nine Tupolev SB bombers, claiming four SB-2 bombers shot down, including one by Omert. On 2 July in support of the German and Romanian Operation München, III. Gruppe moved to an airfield at Iași.

On 9 December 1941, Omert claimed three Polikarpov I-15 fighters over the Mius-Front, aerial victories 36 to 38. By end-1941, Omert had increased his total number of aerial victories to 40 claims. On 10 February 1942, Omert was appointed Staffelkapitän of 8. Staffel of JG 77, replacing Leutnant Wilhelm Schopper in this capacity. On 19 March, III. Gruppe flew its last combat missions before it was replaced by II. Gruppe of JG 77 and withdrawn for a brief period of rest and replenishment. That day, Omert was awarded the Knight's Cross of the Iron Cross (Ritterkreuz des Eisernen Kreuzes). In mid-April, the Gruppe reunited again at Wien-Aspern Airfield where they received 40 factory new Bf 109 F4/R1 aircraft. On 5 May, the Gruppe began its relocation back to the Eastern Front to participate in Operation Fredericus, the Second Battle of Kharkov.

=== Mediterranean Theater and Romania ===
On 23 October 1942, the British Eighth Army launched the Second Battle of El Alamein. Preceding this attack, the Luftwaffe had already planned to replace Jagdgeschwader 27 (JG 27—27th Fighter Wing), which had been fighting in North African theater, with JG 77. In preparation for this rotation, III. Gruppe of JG 77 was moved to Munich on 19 October where it was equipped with the Bf 109 G-2/trop. On 23 and 24 October, the Gruppe moved to Bari in southern Italy. The Gruppe then relocated to Tobruk Airfield on 26 October. The following day, the Gruppe moved to an airfield at Tanyet-Harun.

On 31 January 1943, Omert claimed two Curtiss P-40 Warhawk fighters near Kebili and El Hamma. On 17 February, Omert was awarded the German Cross in Gold (Deutsches Kreuz in Gold). On 4 April, Omert claimed a Supermarine Spitfire fighter shot down 10 kilometers (6.2 miles) northwest of Skhira. On 13 July, Omert was shot down and wounded in his Messerschmitt Bf 109 G-6 (Werknummer 18447—factory number) in aerial combat with Lockheed P-38 Lightning fighters resulting in an emergency landing north-northeast of Enna. During his convalescence, he was temporarily replaced by Oberleutnant Helmut Hänsel.

When on 10 March 1944, Major Kurt Ubben, the commander of III. Gruppe of JG 77 was transferred, Omert was appointed Gruppenkommandeur (group commander) of III. Gruppe. At the time, Omert at the time was still with II. Gruppe of JG 77 and in consequence, III. Gruppe was briefly led by Hauptmann Karl Bresoschek. Omert was killed in action on 24 April 1944 after attacking USAAF four engine bombers over Finta Mare, Romania. He bailed out of his Bf 109 G-6 (Werknummer 160826) and was then shot and killed by marauding US fighter aircraft while hanging in his parachute. Command of III. Gruppe was then again given to Bresoschek, and later to Oberleutnant Erhard Niese, before Major Armin Köhler took command on 1 August 1944.

== Summary of career ==
=== Aerial victory claims ===
According to US historian David T. Zabecki, Omert was credited with 70 aerial victories. Spick also lists him with 70 aerial victories, 50 on the Eastern Front, 3 in the Mediterranean theater and 17 on the Western Front, claimed in approximately 700 combat missions. Mathews and Foreman, authors of Luftwaffe Aces — Biographies and Victory Claims, researched the German Federal Archives and found documentation for 55 aerial victory claims, plus ten further unconfirmed claims. This number includes 42 claims on the Eastern Front and 13 on the Western Front, including two four-engined bombers.

Victory claims were logged to a map-reference (PQ = Planquadrat), for example "PQ 3744". The Luftwaffe grid map (Jägermeldenetz) covered all of Europe, western Russia and North Africa and was composed of rectangles measuring 15 minutes of latitude by 30 minutes of longitude, an area of about 360 square miles (930 km^{2}). These sectors were then subdivided into 36 smaller units to give a location area 3 km × 4 km (1.9 mi × 2.5 mi) in size.

Chronicle of aerial victories
This and the – (dash) indicates unconfirmed aerial victory claims for which Omert did not receive credit. This along with the * (asterisk) indicates an Herausschuss (separation shot)—a severely damaged heavy bomber forced to separate from his combat box which was counted as an aerial victory. This and the ? (question mark) indicates information discrepancies listed by Prien, Stemmer, Rodeike, Bock, Mathews and Foreman.
Claim	Date	Time	Type	Location	Claim!	Date	Time	Type	Location
– 9. Staffel of Jagdgeschwader 77 – Balkans and Crete — 1 April – 1 June 1941
1	6 April 1941	12:40	IK-2	Belgrade northwest of Prnjavor	2	26 May 1941	15:50	Blenheim	Maleme
– 9. Staffel of Jagdgeschwader 77 – Operation Barbarossa — 22 June – September 1941
3	24 June 1941	— ? (Note: According to Mathews and Foreman claimed at 05:55 as a Ilyushin DB-3.)	SB-2?		14	29 August 1941	07:24	DB-3	
4	24 June 1941	18:42	SB-2		? (Note: According to Prien, Stemmer, Rodeike and Bock, this claim was attributed to Feldwebel Robert Helmer, not to Omert as stated by Mathews and Foreman.)	1 September 1941	16:02	I-16	
5	24 June 1941	18:50	SB-2		15	2 September 1941	08:55	SB-2	
6	26 June 1941	— ? (Note: According to Mathews and Foreman claimed at 10:58 as a Ilyushin DB-3.)	ZKB-19?		16	6 September 1941	09:20	I-16	
7	26 June 1941	10:50	SB-2		17	6 September 1941	09:30	I-16	
8	26 June 1941	10:56	SB-2		18	8 September 1941	07:30	I-16	PQ 3744
9	26 June 1941	11:12	SB-2		19	23 September 1941	17:17	I-153	
10	4 August 1941	18:44? (Note: According to Mathews and Foreman claimed at 16:35 as a Polikarpov R-5.)	R-10?		20	25 September 1941	13:13	SB-2	
11	20 August 1941	18:32	Seversky		21	28 September 1941	15:50	Il-2	
12? (Note: This claim is not listed by Mathews and Foreman.)	22 August 1941	14:38	I-15		22	30 September 1941	10:30	Il-2	
13	29 August 1941	07:16	DB-3						
– Stab III. Gruppe of Jagdgeschwader 77 – Operation Barbarossa — October – 5 December 1941
23	2 October 1941	11:51	MiG-3	PQ 3858	30	20 October 1941	13:10	LaGG-3	10 km (6.2 mi) northwest of Dzhankoi
24	9 October 1941	15:10	MiG-3		31	20 October 1941	16:15	I-15	8 km (5.0 mi) southwest of Juschun
25	9 October 1941	15:11	MiG-3		32? (Note: According to Mathews and Foreman this claim is unconfirmed.)	20 October 1941	—	I-15	
26	10 October 1941	06:22	MiG-3		33?	23 October 1941	—	I-16	
27	10 October 1941	06:24	MiG-3		34	23 October 1941	16:25	I-15	
28	12 October 1941	10:10	I-16	PQ 3628	35	26 October 1941	15:32	I-15	
29	18 October 1941	06:10	LaGG-3						
– Stab III. Gruppe of Jagdgeschwader 77 – Eastern Front — 6 December 1941 – 10 February 1942
36	9 December 1941	12:33	I-15		39	11 December 1941	13:39	SB-2	
37	9 December 1941	12:36	I-15		40	24 January 1942	16:05	R-5	
38	9 December 1941	12:38	I-15						
– 8. Staffel of Jagdgeschwader 77 – Eastern Front — 10 February – 20 March 1942
41	23 February 1942	11:20	I-153		43?	14 March 1942	—	I-61 (MiG-3)	
42?	23 February 1942	—	I-15		44	16 March 1942	10:58	DB-3	PQ 5687 vicinity of Kerch
—	12 March 1942	—	I-153		45?	16 March 1942	—	I-180 (Yak-7)	
– 8. Staffel of Jagdgeschwader 77 – Eastern Front — 1 May – 16 October 1942
47? (Note: The authors Prien, Stemmer, Rodeike and Bock, list this claim as his 47th aerial victory, not stating when the 46th victory was claimed. According to Mathews and Foreman this claim is unconfirmed.)	9 May 1942	—	I-16		51	18 June 1942	— ? (Note: According to Mathews and Foreman claimed at 15:13.)	Il-2	
48	20 May 1942	04:07	Pe-2	PQ 79241; 5 km (3.1 mi) north-northwest of Sloviansk	52	12 September 1942	14:02	LaGG-3	PQ 10182
49	26 May 1942	14:10	Il-2	PQ 60832 vicinity of Petrovskaya	53?	13 September 1942	—	Il-2	
50	12 June 1942	18:26	Il-2	PQ 35444					
– 8. Staffel of Jagdgeschwader 77 – Mediterranean Theater, North Africa — 26 October – 31 December 1942
54?	7 November 1942	—	P-40		—	21 December 1942	—	P-40	southeast of Sirte
55	10 December 1942	10:30	P-40	PQ 03 Ost 9135					
– 8. Staffel of Jagdgeschwader 77 – Mediterranean Theater, North Africa — 1 January – May 1943
56	14 January 1943	11:25	P-40	PQ 13 Ost 42143, west of Bir Dufan	59	26 February 1943	08:45	P-40	PQ 13 Ost 04353, Mareth
57	31 January 1943	12:43	P-38	PQ 03 Ost 94153, south of Sened	60	26 February 1943	15:45	P-40	PQ 13 Ost 04874, southeast of Medenine
58	31 January 1943	12:48	P-38	PQ 03 Ost 94151, south of Sened	61	4 April 1943	10:57	Spitfire	10 km (6.2 mi) northwest of Cekleira
– 8. Staffel of Jagdgeschwader 77 – Mediterranean Theater, Italy — June – 25 October 1943
— ? (Note: This unconfirmed claim is not listed by Mathews and Foreman.)	23 June 1943	—	P-38		— ?	24 June 1943	—	P-38	
– Stab II. Staffel of Jagdgeschwader 77 – Mediterranean Theater, Italy — 29 January – 31 March 1944
62	19 February 1944	13:27	Spitfire	15 km (9.3 mi) northeast of Nettuno	63	19 February 1944	13:57	Spitfire	PQ 14 Ost S/GD-5; Marta
– Stab III. Staffel of Jagdgeschwader 77 – Mediterranean Theater, Italy — 3 – 24 April 1944
64	5 April 1944? (Note: According to Mathews and Foreman claimed on 4 April 1944.)	14:22	B-24*	PQ 24 Ost 55143; 20 km (12 mi) east of Pitești	65	5 April 1944?	15:00	B-24	PQ 24 Ost 55242; 25 km (16 mi) west-southwest of Târgșoru Nou

=== Awards ===
- Iron Cross (1939) 2nd and 1st Class
- Honour Goblet of the Luftwaffe on 25 January 1942 as Leutnant and pilot
- Knight's Cross of the Iron Cross on 19 March 1942 as Leutnant and pilot in the III./Jagdgeschwader 77 (Note: According to Scherzer as pilot in the 8./Jagdgeschwader 77.)
- German Cross in Gold on 17 February 1943 as Oberleutnant in the I./Jagdgeschwader 77

== Notes ==
Military offices
Preceded by Major Siegfried Freytag	Gruppenkommandeur of II./JG 77; 29 January 1944 - 3 April 1944	Succeeded by Major Armin Köhler
Preceded by Hauptmann Karl Bresoschek	Gruppenkommandeur of III./JG 77; 3 April 1944 - 24 April 1944	Succeeded by Hauptmann Karl Bresoschek
