= Siegfried Freytag =

German World War II flying ace and member of the French Foreign Legion

- Born: 10 November 1919; Danzig-Langfuhr
- Died: 1 June 2003 (aged 83); Puyloubier, France
- Military career
- Allegiance: Nazi Germany; France (1952–1970)
- Branch: Luftwaffe; French Foreign Legion
- Rank: Major (Germany); Sergent (France)
- Units: JG 51, JG 77, JG 7 5th Foreign Infantry Regiment; 13th Demi-Brigade of the Foreign Legion; 1st Foreign Regiment
- Commands: II./JG 77, JG 77
- Conflicts: See battles World War II: Battle of Greece; Battle of Crete; Eastern Front; Defense of the Reich; First Indochina War Algerian War
- Awards: Knight's Cross of the Iron Cross

Siegfried Freytag (10 November 1919 – 1 June 2003) was a World War II German Luftwaffe pilot and wing commander. As a fighter ace, he was credited with 102 aerial victories of which 49 victories were claimed over the Eastern Front. Among his victories over the Western Front are at least 2 four-engine bombers. He was a recipient of the Knight's Cross of the Iron Cross. Freytag had been nominated for the Knight's Cross of the Iron Cross with Oak Leaves, but the war ended before the paperwork had been processed.

Freytag was born on 10 November 1919 and joined the Luftwaffe in 1938. After completing training as a fighter pilot he was posted to 6. Staffel (squadron) Jagdgeschwader 77 (JG 77—Fighter Wing 77) in the autumn, 1940. Freytag claimed his first victory on 31 October 1940 on the final day of the Battle of Britain. In April 1941 he participated in the Balkans Campaign, the Battle of Greece and Battle of Crete. In June Freytag was deployed to the Eastern Front with JG 77 for Operation Barbarossa, the invasion of the Soviet Union. Freytag passed five victories becoming a flying ace and by 3 June 1942 he had claimed 50 enemy aircraft destroyed.

On 27 June 1942, Freytag was appointed Staffelkapitän (Squadron leader) of 1. Staffel and relocated to the Mediterranean Theatre. Freytag participated in the air battle over Malta. On 3 July 1942 Freytag was awarded the Knight's Cross of the Iron Cross for 53 aerial victories. He became the most successful German pilot over Malta. Freytag was transferred with his unit to North Africa to assist the collapsing Axis forces. On 13 March 1943, Freytag was appointed Gruppenkommandeur (Group Commander) of II./JG 77. By this date he had claimed 85 victories. Freytag continued operations over Sicily where he was shot down and wounded in action on 12 July 1943.

Thereafter, Freytag led the group in Defence of the Reich operations. On 13 June 1944 Freytag scored his 100th victory. In December 1944 Freytag commanded JG 77 in air superiority operations on the Western Front at the beginning Ardennes Offensive until 25 December 1944 when he was appointed Geschwaderkommodore (Wing Commander) on a temporary basis. Freytag scored his 102nd and last aerial victory during Operation Bodenplatte, on 1 January 1945. In April 1945 Freytag served with Jagdgeschwader 51 (JG 51—Fighter Wing 51) and Jagdgeschwader 7 (JG 7—Fighter Wing 7), where he flew the Messerschmitt Me 262 until the German surrender in May 1945.

After the war he served in the French Foreign Legion. Freytag died in France in 2003.

== Early life ==
Freytag was born on 10 November 1919 in Danzig-Langfuhr, at the time in the Province of West Prussia. Today Danzig-Langfuhr is Wrzeszcz, a borough of the Polish city of Gdańsk. Following flight training, (Note: Flight training in the Luftwaffe progressed through the levels A1, A2 and B1, B2, referred to as A/B flight training. A training included theoretical and practical training in aerobatics, navigation, long-distance flights and dead-stick landings. The B courses included high-altitude flights, instrument flights, night landings and training to handle the aircraft in difficult situations. For pilots destined to fly multi-engine aircraft, the training was completed with the Luftwaffe Advanced Pilot's Certificate (Erweiterter Luftwaffen-Flugzeugführerschein), also known as the C-Certificate.) he was posted to the 6. Staffel (6th squadron) of Jagdgeschwader 77 (JG 77—77th Fighter Wing).

== World War II ==
World War II in Europe had begun on Friday 1 September 1939 when German forces invaded Poland. Freytag began wartime operations in October 1940. On 31 October—considered by the British to be the final day of the Battle of Britain—on patrol west of Lista, Norway, at 16:00 CET, he shot down a RAF Coastal Command Lockheed Hudson, T9377 from No. 233 Squadron RAF. Pilot Officer W.O. Weaber, B. P. Erskine Sergeant J. A. Wallace and H. Dean were killed in action, buried at Sola Church and commemorated at the Runnymede Memorial. During the Battle of Greece, on 24 April 1941, Freytag crashed his Bf 109E near Athens following combat and was wounded.

=== Eastern Front ===
In early June I. and III./JG 77 were deployed to Romania and subordinated to IV. Fliegerkorps under the command of Kurt Pflugbeil. The battle group was designated as close air support to Army Group South. On 22 June 1941 the German Wehrmacht commenced Operation Barbarossa, the invasion of the Soviet Union. Freytag achieved steady success. He reported his 10th claim on 12 August 1941 and his 20th victory on 31 October 1941. This day he downed a Mikoyan-Gurevich MiG-3 in the morning during a combat air patrol to support German forces in the Battle of Rostov. Aleksandr Grosul and Ivan Voytenko of the 55 IAP were reported missing in action. On 23 March 1942, Freytag engaged and shot down a Yakovlev Yak-1. The Staffel engaged three Yak-1s from the 247 IAP this day, piloted by Major Mikhail Fedoseyev, the unit commander, Stepan Karnach, Vasiliy Shevchuk and Viktor Golovko. Fedoseyev was killed while Shevchuk was shot down and force-landed. One of the Yak fighters became Freytag's 26th victory. II./JG 77 also took a heavy toll of Soviet air forces in the Siege of Odessa, before Freytag's group was withdrawn to Kherson. In the autumn, 1941, JG 77 was heavily involved in operations over the Crimea. In December the Red Army made an amphibious assault on the eastern end of the region to disrupt the Siege of Sevastopol and re-establish airbases there. Throughout December 1941 and through to June 1942, north I. and II./JG 77 were involved in combat operations (III./JG 77 was removed because of losses). Kerch fell to the Axis on 20 May 1942. Freytag's II. Gruppe (2nd group) participated in the Sevastopol operation with III. Gruppe until mid-June.

=== Malta, North Africa and Sicily ===
On 27 June 1942, Freytag was appointed Staffelkapitän (squadron leader) of 1. Staffel and was transferred with this squadron to Sicily. From here, I./JG 77 was to escort German bomber formations attacking Malta and its sea communications. Freytag achieved a series of successes against Royal Air Force (RAF) fighters over the summer of 1942 that he was nicknamed the Stern von Malta (The Star of Malta). On 3 July Freytag was awarded the Knight's Cross of the Iron Cross (Ritterkreuz des Eisernen Kreuzes) for 50 victories. On 27 July Freytag led eight Bf 109s in a battle against Supermarine Spitfires, but the German formation lost three—including Freytag who ditched into the Mediterranean Sea after being shot down. Freytag was rescued by a seaplane. On 6 July Freytag shot down American Flight Sergeant Edwin Moye of No. 185 Squadron RAF, who was killed. By 11 October 1942 Freytag had claimed 73 aircraft destroyed. On this date Freytag claimed a solitary Spitfire.

On 23 October 1942 1. Staffel was transferred to Egypt as the North African campaign entered its final phase. The British Army began the Second Battle of El Alamein and the Luftwaffe rushed in reinforcements. On 11 November 1942, near El Alamein, Freytag claimed two Spitfires. On 13 January Freytag may have shot down a Martin Baltimore. On 28 January he accounted for a Martin B-26 Marauder. On 1 March 1943 Freytag was promoted to Hauptmann.

=== Group commander ===
On 7 March 1943 Freytag was appointed temporary Gruppenkommandeur (group commander) of II./JG 77 based at La Fauconnerie, Tunisia. He officially succeeded Major Anton Mader in this capacity who had been transferred on 1 April. In the afternoon of the 13 March Geschwaderkommodore (wing commander) Joachim Müncheberg led I./JG 77 over Gabes. On this sortie, Freytag claimed his 86th and 87th victories, after Müncheberg ordered them to attack some low-flying United States Army Air Force (USAAF) P-39 Airacobras.

On 30 March Freytag led the Gruppe against USAAF bombing raids. The Bf 109s engaged the US 52d Fighter Group, which was escorting 18 A-20 Havoc bombers against La Fauconnerie. Ernst-Wilhelm Reinert claimed two bombers before the P-40s claimed two German fighters. Freytag claimed one P-40 in this battle for his 88th victory. On 4 April JG 77 engaged in a day of heavy air combat with the new commanding officer Johannes Steinhoff and lost three pilots. Steinhoff and Reinert claimed three and one respectively. Their opponents were Spitfires and Curtiss P-40 Warhawks from the US 33rd Fighter Group. Freytag claimed a Spitfire on this day. On 5 April Operation Flax commenced as Allied air forces attacked German air transports. The Tunisian Campaign ended with the Axis capitulation on 13 May 1943. Freytag accounted for his last victory in this theatre on 7 May when he downed a Spitfire over Tunis—his 94th victory. JG 77 was the last German fighter unit to leave Africa.

II./JG 77 relocated to Sicily. There the formation was responsible for the air defence of the island. Freytag gained four victories over Sicily including two on 9 July. The same day Operation Husky began and Allied forces landed. Three days later Freytag was shot down and wounded in combat with Lockheed P-38 Lightning over Gela. Allied forces achieved air supremacy by 13 July and all except II./Jagdgeschwader 51 (JG 51—51st Fighter Wing) had been driven to the northeastern coast. Few fighters remained, but II./JG 77 abandoned Trapani and the remnants of the German fighter units retreated to Foggia in Italy. By the time JG 77 departed Sicily, it had claimed 27 Allied aircraft in combat from 10 to 31 July 1943 but lost 51 Bf 109s and 12 pilots killed. II./JG 77 remained on the Mediterranean Front. Freytag was wounded by an Allied air attack on the group's airfield at Siena, Italy on 29 January 1944. During his convalescence, he was temporarily replaced by Hauptmann Emil Omert as Gruppenkommandeur of II. Gruppe. Freytag returned to his command in April 1944.

The Gruppe participated in the Italian Campaign until its withdrawal the following summer. Freytag claimed his victories over Consolidated B-24 Liberators on 29 May and 13 June 1944. On the latter date the US 15th Air Force bombed targets in Sisak, Yugoslavia and Pétfürdő, Hungary using the 47th Bomb Wing and 55th Bomb Wing. The B-24 Freytag claimed was his 100th victory. According to Obermaier, he claimed his 100th aerial victory in December 1944 which would make him the 96th Luftwaffe pilot to achieve the century mark.

=== Defence of the Reich and Western Front ===
II. Gruppe flew its last combat mission in Italy on 6 September. Two days later the Gruppe began relocating to Germany, arriving at Munich-Riem Airfield on 12 September, completing the transfer to Jüterbog Airfield on 14 September for Defence of the Reich operations. This period was not successful for Freytag. On 27 September 1944 during the Battle of Arnhem, 26 Bf 109 fighters of Gefechtsverband Michalski, named after Major Gerhard Michalski, flew a combat air patrol to Arnhem and Nijmegen, focusing on the area south of Driel to west of Elst. On this mission, Feytag may have shot down Henry Wallace McLeod, who was also one of the most successful aces over Malta. Freytag claimed the only Spitfire on 27 September 1944 in the Duisburg area. James "Johnnie" Johnson had been in the same combat and saw McLeod chasing a Bf 109 and then lost sight of McLeod. Johnson concluded that the Bf 109 had shot down McLeod. His body was found in the wreckage of his Spitfire near Wesel, not far from Duisburg.

On 16 December the German High Command (Oberkommando der Wehrmacht) initiated Unternehmen Wacht am Rhein (Operation Watch on the Rhine), a land offensive through the Ardennes. The Luftwaffe supported the offensive. JG 77 suffered heavily in the air battles with the RAF Second Tactical Air Force and the US Ninth Air Force and Eighth Air Force. On 23 December 1944 I./JG 77 lost 15 fighters and six pilots killed in exchange for one P-47 Thunderbolt and a B-26 Marauder. In the afternoon, III./JG 77 were engaged by P-47s over Bad Münstereifel and lost 10 Bf 109s destroyed and three damaged along with two pilots killed and six wounded. Only three P-47s were claimed.

On Christmas Eve, JG 77 attempted an all-out effort to support the 5th Panzer Army and the 6th Panzer Army as their advance stalled. Freytag's I./JG 77 took off from Dortmund with 24 Bf 109s and flew a patrol in the Luxembourg area. In large-scale air fighting, Major Johannes Wiese, Geschwaderkommodore of JG 77 was wounded in combat with Spitfires. I./JG 77 was decimated when it encountered P-47 and P-38s in the target area. 16 Bf 109s were shot down and 10 pilots killed, including experienced leader Lothar Baumann (2./JG 77). One pilot became a prisoner of war in exchange for a single P-38. The losses had a devastating effect on morale. Until Wiese's formal replacement arrived with the Geschwader, command was temporally passed on to Freytag. JG 77's ordeal was not over. On Christmas Day 1944, the Eighth Air Force sent 2,034 heavy bombers and 818 fighters to attack airfields and communication centres in the largest single-attack of the war. RAF Bomber Command sent 338 aircraft (248 Avro Lancaster, 248 Handley-Page Halifax and 11 de Havilland Mosquito bombers) to attack airfields at Düsseldorf-Lohausen and Essen-Mülheim. The airfields were home to III. and II./JG 77. The bases were severely damaged and forced the units to operate from grass airfields.

=== Acting wing commander and end of war ===
On 26 December, Freytag temporarily assumed command of JG 77 as Geschwaderkommodore. JG 77 tried to support the offensive in the last week of December. On 27 December, the Geschwader flew operations with all Gruppen but in small numbers. Three P-47s were claimed for the loss of three pilots and four Bf 109s. On 29 December the grass at Essen became to wet and II./JG 77 moved to Bönninghardt, a small grass field southwest of Wesel. On 31 December Freytag organised III./JG 77s withdrawal to Dortmund. During the transfer, the remaining 12 Bf 109s of the Gruppe were engaged by Allied fighters and lost three Bf 109s and two pilots. Freytag's command had lost 31 dead or missing, 13 wounded and one captured. The fighter unit had lost 86 Bf 109s destroyed or damaged against 15 Allied aircraft claimed.

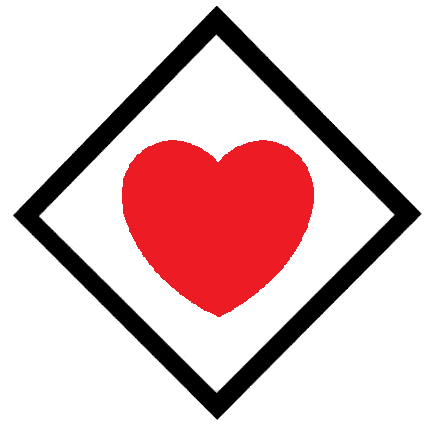
Herzas (Ace of Hearts) emblem of JG 77

Freytag participated and led JG 77 in Operation Bodenplatte, the failed attempt to cripple Allied air forces in the Low Countries. The objective of Bodenplatte was to gain air superiority. Freytag was ordered to lead II./JG 77 in an attack on the airfield at Antwerp-Deurne. This airbase hosted RAF Hawker Typhoon wings that had dogged German forces from Normandy to Germany. On the morning of 1 January 1945 Freytag was ordered to lead both I. and III. He conducted the brief that morning. At 08:00, the two formations 18 Bf 109s of I. and III./JG 77 took off. At the same time 23 Bf 109s of II./JG 77 took off. Around the Bocholt area they formed up with the other two Gruppen. As the fighter wing headed north, it passed Woensdrecht airfield. The aerodrome was home to 132 Wing and its five Spitfire squadrons; 331, 332, 66 and 127, and 322 (Dutch). Some pilots from II./JG 77 either mistakenly believed it to be Antwerp, or thought the opportunity was too good to pass up. Two German fighters were claimed shot down, and one pilot captured. However, none of the JG 77 casualties fit this description.

The main body continued to Antwerp. Some 12–30 German fighters attacked the airfield from 09:25 to 09:40. The ground defences were alert and the German formations attacked in a disorganised manner. 145 Wing RAF was missed completely and considering the large number of targets the destruction was light; just 12 Spitfires were destroyed. In total, 14 Allied aircraft were destroyed and nine damaged. JG 77 lost 11 Bf 109s and their pilots were lost. Six were killed and five captured according to Allied sources. However, German records show the loss of only 10 pilots. Four are listed as captured. During the battle Freytag claimed his 102nd aerial victory over a Spitfire that day, his last aerial victory claimed. No details are known. JG 77's attack was a failure.

On 15 January 1945, Freytag relinquished command of JG 77 to Major Erich Leie who had already officially been appointed Geschwaderkommodore on 29 December 1944. On 7 March 1945, Leie was killed in action when he collided with a crashing Russian Yakovlev Yak-9 fighter which he had just shot down. Freytag was subsequently again given the task of leading JG 77. Freytag returned to II. Gruppe on 1 April when command of JG 77 was given to Major Fritz Losigkeit. Freytag had left JG 77 in late April. He was scheduled to take over command of JG 51 but never took command of this unit. Instead, he traveled to Prague where he joined Jagdgeschwader 7 "Nowotny" (JG 7—7th Fighter Wing), flying the Messerschmitt Me 262, the first operational jet fighter. He had been nominated for the Knight's Cross of the Iron Cross with Oak Leaves (Ritterkreuz des Eisernen Kreuzes mit Eichenlaub) which was not approved before the war ended.

== French Foreign Legion and death ==
Following World War 2, Freytag was without a job and without a family. One of his brothers was killed in 1944 on the Eastern Front, his sister and the rest of his family disappeared in the sinking of the MV Wilhelm Gustloff. The family assets having been confiscated by the post-war territorial divisions, he then worked as a miner and then as a technician.

In 1952, Freytag, volunteered in the Legion thinking that the Legion would recruit pilots; at least, that was the official version of a wrong assumption. Assigned to the 5th Foreign Infantry Regiment after his basic training at Sidi Bel Abbès, Legionnaire Siegfried served and fought with distinction for 18 years with the 13th Demi-Brigade of the Foreign Legion; the former Free French Demi-Brigade, in the Indochina War, the Algerian War and Djibouti. Promoted to Sergent in 1962, he asked to be demoted to the rank of Caporal Chef and served in the 1st Foreign Regiment from 1965 to 1970, the year in which he retired from active duty. Freytag died on 2 June 2003 in Marseille. He was interred in the Carré militaire of the Institution des invalides de la Légion étrangère in Puyloubier.

== Summary of career ==
=== Aerial victory claims ===
According to US historian David T. Zabecki, Freytag was credited with 102 aerial victories. Spick lists Freytag with 102 aerial victories as well, of which approximately 70 were claimed over the Eastern Front and further 32 over the Western Front, North Africa and Mediterranean theater, claimed in an unknown number of combat missions. Obermaier also lists him with 102 aerial victories, of which 49 were claimed over the Eastern Front. Mathews and Foreman, authors of Luftwaffe Aces — Biographies and Victory Claims, researched the German Federal Archives and state that Freytag was credited with 89 aerial victories, 44 on the Eastern Front and 45 on the Western Front, including three heavy bombers. In addition to these claims, according to Prien, Stemmer, Rodeike and Bock, Freytag further claimed eleven, potentially twelve, undocumented aerial victories.

Victory claims were logged to a map-reference (PQ = Planquadrat), for example "PQ 35391". The Luftwaffe grid map (Jägermeldenetz) covered all of Europe, western Russia and North Africa and was composed of rectangles measuring 15 minutes of latitude by 30 minutes of longitude, an area of about 360 square miles (930 km^{2}). These sectors were then subdivided into 36 smaller units to give a location area 3 km × 4 km (1.9 mi × 2.5 mi) in size.

Chronicle of aerial victories
This and the – (dash) indicates unconfirmed aerial victory claims for which Freytag did not receive credit. This and the ? (question mark) indicates information discrepancies listed by Prien, Stemmer, Rodeike, Bock, Mathews and Foreman. This and the # (hash mark) indicates those aerial victories listed by Prien, Stemmer, Rodeike and Bock, in some instances without an explicit sequence number. This and the ! (exclamation mark) indicates those aerial victories listed by Mathews and Foreman.
Claim#	Claim!	Date	Time	Type	Location	Claim#	Claim!	Date	Time	Type	Location
– 6. Staffel of Jagdgeschwader 77 – Action in Norway — 6 April – 10 November 1940
1	1	31 October 1940	16:00	Hudson	west of Lista						
– 5. Staffel of Jagdgeschwader 77 – Operation Barbarossa — 22 June – 5 December 1941
#	2	28 July 1941	19:20	I-153		#	5	10 August 1941	16:55	I-153	
#	—	3 August 1941	—	I-16		#	6	12 August 1941	15:48	I-16	
#	3	10 August 1941	08:15	I-15		#	7	12 August 1941	18:35	I-16	
#	4	10 August 1941	10:43	I-15							
According to Prien, Stemmer, Rodeike and Bock, Freytag claimed eight undocumented aerial victories in the timeframe 22 August to 5 September 1941. These eight claims are not listed by Mathews and Foreman.
#	8	31 October 1941	10:45	MiG-3		#	10	29 November 1941	11:00	MiG-3	
#	9	27 November 1941	08:57	MiG-3		#	11	29 November 1941	11:18	I-16	
– 5. Staffel of Jagdgeschwader 77 – Eastern Front — 17 March – 30 April 1942
21	12	17 March 1942	12:12	I-153		#	19	26 March 1942	07:17	I-16	
22	13	17 March 1942	12:31	I-16		#	20	9 April 1942	12:02	I-301 (LaGG-3)	
23	14	19 March 1942	16:27	DB-3		#	21	9 April 1942	17:35	I-153	
24	15	19 March 1942	16:29	DB-3		#	22	9 April 1942	17:40	I-301 (LaGG-3)	
25	—	19 March 1942	—	DB-3		#	23	13 April 1942	17:20	P-40	
26	16	24 March 1942	07:20	SB-2		#	24	19 April 1942	09:00	I-153	
27	17	24 March 1942	07:22	SB-2		#	25	19 April 1942	12:13	I-16	
28	18	24 March 1942	09:41	DB-3		#	26	20 April 1942	14:25	R-5	
According to Prien, Stemmer, Rodeike and Bock, Freytag claimed two undocumented aerial victories in either March/April 1942. These two claims are not listed by Mathews and Foreman.
– 5. Staffel of Jagdgeschwader 77 – Eastern Front — May 1942
#	27	1 May 1942	10:55	I-16? (Note: According to Mathews and Foreman claimed as a Mikoyan-Gurevich MiG-1.)		#	35	11 May 1942	12:05	DB-3	
#	28	2 May 1942	12:42	I-16		#	36	13 May 1942	07:37	R-5	
#	29	2 May 1942	18:00	I-153		#	37	13 May 1942	07:55	LaGG-3	
#	30	8 May 1942	11:37	I-153		#	38	13 May 1942	14:12	Il-2	
#	31	8 May 1942	11:52	LaGG-3		#	39	13 May 1942	14:18	Yak-1	
#	32	8 May 1942	11:59	Il-2		#	40	16 May 1942	11:45	LaGG-3	
#	33	8 May 1942	13:40	MiG-1		#	41	16 May 1942	11:47	LaGG-3	
#	34	11 May 1942	08:50	Il-2							
– 6. Staffel of Jagdgeschwader 77 – Eastern Front — June – 7 November 1942
#	42	8 June 1942	12:30	LaGG-3	PQ 35391	#	44	11 June 1942	16:05	MiG-1	
#	43	8 June 1942	19:10	I-153	PQ 35441	#	45	13 June 1942	06:15	LaGG-3	
– 1. Staffel of Jagdgeschwader 77 – Mediterranean Theater, Sicily — 1 July – 31 December 1942
58	46	6 July 1942	15:20	Spitfire	vicinity of Malta	69	56	30 July 1942	11:25	Spitfire	vicinity of Malta
59	47	9 July 1942	19:22	Spitfire	vicinity of Malta	70	57	3 August 1942	11:30	Spitfire	vicinity of Malta
60		10 July 1942	06:20	Spitfire		71	58	8 August 1942	11:10	P-40	vicinity of Malta
61	48	18 July 1942	14:53	Spitfire	vicinity of Malta	72	59	8 August 1942	11:15	P-40	vicinity of Malta
62	49	21 July 1942	16:20	Spitfire	vicinity of Malta	73	60	13 August 1942	08:30	Beaufighter	vicinity of Malta
63	50	22 July 1942	11:35	Spitfire	vicinity of Malta	74	61	4 October 1942	08:10	Spitfire	vicinity of Malta
64	51	23 July 1942	10:36	Spitfire	vicinity of Malta	75	62	10 October 1942	09:02	Spitfire	vicinity of Malta
65	52	23 July 1942	16:46	Spitfire	vicinity of Malta	76	63	11 October 1942	08:32	Spitfire	vicinity of Malta
66	53	28 July 1942	10:40	Spitfire	vicinity of Malta	77	64	13 October 1942	17:12	Spitfire	vicinity of Malta
67	54	28 July 1942	17:25	Spitfire	vicinity of Malta	78	65	14 October 1942	17:46	Spitfire	vicinity of Malta
68	55	28 July 1942	17:27	Spitfire	vicinity of Malta						
According to Prien, Stemmer, Rodeike and Bock, Freytag claimed one or two undocumented aerial victories over Malta. These two claims are not listed by Mathews and Foreman.
– 1. Staffel of Jagdgeschwader 77 – Mediterranean Theater, North Africa — 1 July – 31 December 1942
#	66	30 October 1942	—	P-40	El Alamein	#	69	11 November 1942	—	P-40	Sallum/Bir-el-Acra
#	67	10 November 1942	—	Spitfire		#	70	19 December 1942	—	Beaufighter	
#	68	11 November 1942	—	P-40	Sallum/Bir-el-Acra						
– 1. Staffel of Jagdgeschwader 77 – Mediterranean Theater, North Africa — January 1943
84	71	1 January 1943	—	P-40		85	72	13 January 1943	08:40	Baltimore	
– Stab II. Gruppe of Jagdgeschwader 77 – Mediterranean Theater, North Africa — 1 January – 31 December 1943
86	73	13 March 1943	17:43	P-39	50 km (31 mi) southwest of Sfax	91	78	4 April 1943	17:15	Spitfire	35 km (22 mi) east of Meknassy
87	74	13 March 1943	17:55	P-39	15 km (9.3 mi) southeast of La Fauconnerie	92	79	5 April 1943	17:12	Boston	60 km (37 mi) northwest of La Fauconnerie
88	75	21 March 1943	11:47	Spitfire	PQ 03 Ost 9544, 10 km (6.2 mi) southeast of Meknassy	93	80	6 May 1943	15:55	Spitfire	PQ 03 Ost 97261, west of Tunis
89	76	22 March 1943	16:30	Spitfire	PQ 03 Ost 04193, 12 km (7.5 mi) north of Zarat	94	81	6 May 1943	18:30	Spitfire	PQ 03 Ost 97431, southwest of Tunis
90	77	30 March 1943	09:50	P-40	20 km (12 mi) northeast of La Fauconnerie		82	13 June 1943	09:07	B-24	southeast of Pieve
– Stab II. Gruppe of Jagdgeschwader 77 – Mediterranean Theater, Italy — 1 January – 31 December 1943
95	83	4 July 1943	11:38	Spitfire	PQ 13 Ost 57613, southeast of Capo Passero	97	85	9 July 1943	11:00	P-40	15 km (9.3 mi) southeast of Trapani
96	84	8 July 1943	12:25	B-17	18 km (11 mi) north-northeast of Agrigento	98	86	9 July 1943	11:12	P-40	13 km (8.1 mi) southeast of Marsala
– Stab II. Gruppe of Jagdgeschwader 77 – Mediterranean Theater, Italy — May – June 1944
99		28 May 1944	11:42	B-24		100		13 June 1944	09:07	B-24	PQ 14 Ost S/LF-1/4
	87	29 May 1944	11:43	B-24	PQ 14 Ost 66321						
– Stab II. Gruppe of Jagdgeschwader 77 – Defense of the Reich — September – October 1944
101	88	27 September 1944	09:23	Spitfire	PQ 05 Ost HN-7/7; Doesburg						
– Stab II. Gruppe of Jagdgeschwader 77 – Ardennes Offensive — January 1945
102	89	1 January 1945	—	Spitfire							

=== Awards ===
- Iron Cross (1939) 2nd and 1st Class
- Honor Goblet of the Luftwaffe (Ehrenpokal der Luftwaffe) on 18 May 1942 Oberleutnant and pilot
- Knight's Cross of the Iron Cross on 3 July 1942 as Oberleutnant and pilot in the I./Jagdgeschwader 77 (Note: According to Scherzer as pilot in the II./Jagdgeschwader 77)
- German Cross in Gold on 25 January 1943 as Oberleutnant in the 1./Jagdgeschwader 77

== Notes ==
Military offices
Preceded by Major Johannes Wiese	Acting Commander of Jagdgeschwader 77 Herz As; 26 December 1944 – 29 December 1944	Succeeded by Major Erich Leie
Preceded by Major Erich Leie	Acting Commander of Jagdgeschwader 77 Herz As; 7 March 1945 – 31 March 1945	Succeeded by Major Fritz Losigkeit
