= Johannes Wiese =

German fighter pilot during World War II

- Johannes Wiese
- Born: 7 March 1915; Breslau, Schlesien, German Empire
- Died: 16 August 1991 (aged 76); Kirchzarten, Germany
- Military career
- Allegiance: Nazi Germany (to 1945); West Germany
- Branch: Army (1934–36); Luftwaffe (1936–45); German Air Force (1956–70)
- Service years: 1934–45, 1956–70
- Rank: Major (Wehrmacht); Oberstleutnant (Bundeswehr)
- Nickname: "Lion of Kuban"
- Units: JG 52, JG 77
- Commands: 2./JG 52, I./JG 52, JG 77
- Conflicts: See battles World War II: Operation Barbarossa; Eastern Front; Battle of Kursk; Defense of the Reich
- Awards: Knight's Cross of the Iron Cross with Oak Leaves

Johannes Wiese (7 March 1915 – 16 August 1991) was a German Luftwaffe pilot during World War II, a fighter ace credited with 133 enemy aircraft shot down in 480 combat missions. He claimed all of his victories over the Eastern Front, including over 50 Ilyushin Il-2 Shturmovik ground attack aircraft.

Born in Breslau, Wiese volunteered for military service in the Reichswehr of Nazi Germany in 1934. (Note: From 1919, Germany's national defense force was known as the Reichswehr. That name was dropped in favor of Wehrmacht on 16 March 1935.) Initially serving in the Heer (Army), he transferred to the Luftwaffe (Air Force) in 1936. Following flight training, he was posted to Jagdgeschwader 52 (JG 52—52nd Fighter Wing) in June 1941 just prior to Operation Barbarossa, the invasion of the Soviet Union. He claimed his first aerial victory on 23 September 1941. On 26 June 1942, Wiese was appointed Staffelkapitän (squadron leader) of the 2. Staffel (2nd squadron) of JG 52 and received the Knight's Cross of the Iron Cross on 5 January 1943 following his 53rd aerial victory. On 11 May 1943, Wiese was tasked with the leadership of I. Gruppe (1st group) of JG 52 and was officially appointed its Gruppenkommandeur (group commander) on 13 November 1943. Following his 133rd aerial victory, he received the Knight's Cross of the Iron Cross with Oak Leaves on 2 March 1944.

In October 1944, Wiese was posted to the Geschwaderstab (headquarters unit) of Jagdgeschwader 77 (JG 77—77th Fighter Wing) in Defense of the Reich and on 7 November 1944, he was appointed its Geschwaderkommodore (wing commander). After the war in 1956 he joined the Bundeswehr and worked for the Military History Research Office. He retired on 10 November 1970 holding the rank of Oberstleutnant (Lieutenant Colonel). Wiese died on 16 August 1991 in Kirchzarten and was buried in Berlin-Nikolassee.

== Early life and career ==
Wiese was born on 7 March 1915, in Breslau in the Kingdom of Prussia of the German Empire, present-day Wrocław in western Poland, the son of a minister. In 1934, Wiese volunteered for service in the Heer (German Army) and joined Infanterie-Regiment 6 (6th Infantry Regiment) under command of Oberst Kuno-Hans von Both.

In 1936, Wiese transferred to the Luftwaffe as an Oberfähnrich (Officer candidate). There, he was trained as an aerial observer with the Heeresaufklärer (Army Reconnaissance). Wiese was promoted to Leutnant (second lieutenant) on 1 April 1937, and in September 1938 transferred to the Fliegerersatzabteilung 17 (17th Flier Replacement Unit) in Quedlinburg. He then volunteered for the Jagdwaffe (fighter force) and holding the rank of Oberleutnant (first lieutenant) he began fighter pilot training in October 1938. (Note: Flight training in the Luftwaffe progressed through the levels A1, A2 and B1, B2, referred to as A/B flight training. A training included theoretical and practical training in aerobatics, navigation, long-distance flights and dead-stick landings. The B courses included high-altitude flights, instrument flights, night landings and training to handle the aircraft in difficult situations.)

== World War II ==
Wiese was posted to a front-line unit in June 1941, almost two years after the start of World War II. His unit was the Geschwaderstab (headquarters unit) of Jagdgeschwader 52 (JG 52—52nd Fighter Wing) where he served as an adjutant. (Note: For an explanation of Luftwaffe unit designations see Organization of the Luftwaffe during World War II.) On 22 June, the Geschwader crossed into Soviet airspace in support of Operation Barbarossa, the invasion of the Soviet Union, which opened the Eastern Front. He claimed his first aerial victory on 23 September 1941 and was awarded the Iron Cross 2nd Class (Eisernes Kreuz zweiter Klasse) on 27 September 1941 and the Front Flying Clasp of the Luftwaffe in Silver (Frontflugspange in Silber) on 11 October 1941.

=== Eastern Front ===
Wiese received the Iron Cross 1st Class (Eisernes Kreuz erster Klasse) on 1 May 1942. Following his 7th aerial victory he was appointed Staffelkapitän (squadron leader) of the 2. Staffel (2nd squadron) of JG 52 on 26 June 1942. That day, I. Gruppe (1st group), to which his 2. Staffel was subordinated, moved to Bilyi Kolodyaz, approximately 10 kilometers (6.2 miles) southeast of Vovchansk, and fighting in support of Case Blue, the strategic summer offensive in southern Russia with the objective to capture the oil fields of Baku, Grozny and Maykop. He received the Front Flying Clasp of the Luftwaffe in Gold (Frontflugspange in Gold) on 13 July 1942.

To support German forces fighting in the Battle of the Caucasus, I. Gruppe relocated to an airfield at Kerch, in the east of Crimea, on 2 August. At the time, the Gruppe was moved around as a kind of fire brigade, deployed in areas where the Soviet Air Forces was particular active. The Gruppe then moved to Oryol on 15 August. On 29 September 1942, Wiese he claimed his 25th aerial victory. On 25 October 1942, he became an "ace-in-a-day" for the first time, claiming victories 29 to 33. Wiese was awarded the Honour Goblet of the Luftwaffe (Ehrenpokal der Luftwaffe) on 6 November 1942.

On 6 December, the Gruppe moved to an airfield at Rossosh. Here on 16 December, he became an "ace-in-a-day" again which took his total to 43. On 25 December, Wiese claimed his 50th aerial victory. Together with Feldwebel Wilhelm Freuwörth, Wiese was awarded the Knight's Cross of the Iron Cross (Ritterkreuz des Eisernen Kreuzes) on 5 January 1943 following their 56th and 51st aerial victories respectively. The presentation was made by General der Flieger (General of the Flyers) Günther Korten in Rossosh on the Eastern Front. Sources contradict themselves on the exact date of the presentation of the German Cross in Gold (Deutsches Kreuz in Gold). According to Thomas, Patzwall and Scherzer, the presentation was made on 5 December 1942. According to Obermaier and Stockert, the presentation occurred on 8 February 1943.

I./JG 52 insignia

Following a lengthy home leave, Wiese was tasked with the leadership of I. Gruppe of JG 52 on 11 May 1943. The former commander, Major Helmut Bennemann had been severely injured by an incendiary bomb the day before. Initially, Wiese led both 2. Staffel and I. Gruppe in unison until on 1 July Oberleutnant Paul-Heinrich Dähne was given command of the Staffel. On 13 November 1943, he was officially appointed Gruppenkommandeur (group commander) of I. Gruppe and at the end of 1943, Wiese was promoted to Major (major). His most successful day was 5 July 1943, the first day of the Battle of Kursk, when he shot down twelve enemy aircraft in one mission, a double "ace-in-a-day" achievement. All 12 victories were over Ilyushin Il-2 Sturmovikground attack aircraft and took his total to 95 victories. On 17 July 1943, Wiese was credited with his 100th aerial victory. He was the 45th Luftwaffe pilot to achieve the century mark. In end July, Wiese had fallen sick and had to go to a Bad Wiessee for treatment. During his absence, Hauptmann Gerhard Barkhorn, the commander of 4. Staffel, temporarily led I. Gruppe from 4 to 30 August.

Following his 133rd aerial victory and his last, Wiese was awarded the Knight's Cross of the Iron Cross with Oak Leaves (Ritterkreuz des Eisernen Kreuzes mit Eichenlaub) on 2 March 1944, the 418th officer or soldier of the Wehrmacht so honored. Wiese and fellow JG 52 pilots Erich Hartmann, Walter Krupinski, for the Oak Leaves presentation, and Gerhard Barkhorn, for the Swords to his Knight's Cross presentation, travelled on an overnight train from the Anhalter Bahnhof in Berlin to the Führerhauptquartier (Führer Headquarter) at the Berghof in Berchtesgaden for the award ceremony by Adolf Hitler on 4 April 1944. Also present at the award ceremony were Kurt Bühligen, Horst Ademeit, Reinhard Seiler, Hans-Joachim Jabs, Dr. Maximilian Otte, Bernhard Jope and Hansgeorg Bätcher from the bomber force, and the Flak officer Fritz Petersen, all destined to receive the Oak Leaves. On the train, all of them got drunk on cognac and champagne. Supporting each other and unable to stand, they arrived at Berchtesgaden. Major Nicolaus von Below, Hitler's Luftwaffe adjutant, was shocked. After some sobering up, they were still intoxicated. Hartmann took a German officer's hat from a stand and put it on, but it was too large. Von Below became upset, told Hartmann it was Hitler's and ordered him to put it back.

On 22 February 1944, Wiese was injured in combat when he was shot down by anti-aircraft artillery in his Bf 109 G-6. Command of I. Gruppe was temporarily assumed by Oberleutnant Paul-Heinrich Dähne before Hauptmann Adolf Borchers was given command on 11 June. Following his convalescence, he was posted to the Verbandsführerschule (Training School for Unit Leaders) of the General der Jagdflieger (General of Fighters) at Königsberg in der Neumark, present-day Chojna in western Poland, on 11 June 1944. This ended his service on the Eastern Front.

=== Defense of the Reich and wing commander of JG 77 ===
On 19 June 1944, Wiese participated in comparison test flights at the Luftwaffe's main testing ground for new aircraft designs at Rechlin. On that day, the Luftwaffe tested and compared the Messerschmitt Bf 109 G-6, a Bf 109 G-6/AS, a Focke-Wulf Fw 190 A-8 against a P-47 Thunderbolt and a P-51 Mustang.

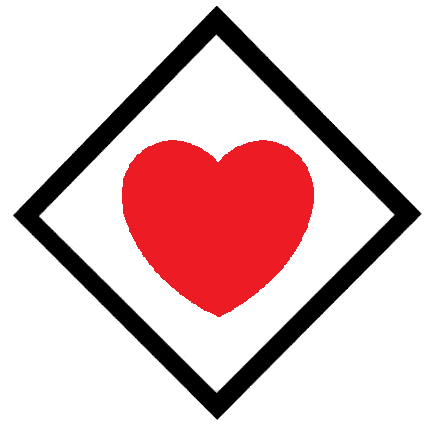
Herzas (Ace of Hearts) emblem of JG 77

In October 1944, Wiese was posted to the Geschwaderstab of Jagdgeschwader 77 (JG 77—77th Fighter Wing) in Defense of the Reich on the Western Front. On 7 November 1944, he was appointed Geschwaderkommodore (wing commander) of JG 77, replacing Oberstleutnant (Lieutenant Colonel) Johannes Steinhoff, who was given command of Jagdgeschwader 7 "Nowotny" (JG 7—7th Fighter Wing), the first operational jet fighter wing in the world. Officially, command was handed over on 1 December 1944.

On 16 December 1944, the Wehrmacht launched its last major offensive campaign of the war. The operation codenamed Unternehmen Wacht am Rhein, or Battle of the Bulge (16 December 1944 – 25 January 1945), which failed to achieve its objectives, intended to split the British and American Allied line in half, so the Germans could then proceed to encircle and destroy four Allied armies, forcing the Western Allies to negotiate a peace treaty in the Axis Powers' favor.

Wiese led JG 77 in the opening phase of the offensive until 25 December 1944, when he was severely injured in a training exercise. Wiese and his wingman, Feldwebel (Sergeant) Hansch, took off at 11:20 a.m. on a training flight over German held territory. The plan was to meet up with I. Gruppe but the two failed to establish contact. Instead, flying at an altitude of 8,700 meters (28,500 feet), they encountered a flight of Supermarine Spitfires in the vicinity of Bottrop and Essen. In the resulting aerial combat, both Bf 109 G-14s were shot down, Hansch was killed in action while Wiese bailed out. He came down near Essen-Dellwig. His parachute only opened partially, resulting in a harsh landing, and loss of consciousness. Wiese was taken to a field hospital at Bottrop where he was diagnosed with a concussion and minor skull fracture. He spent the rest of the winter in hospital, and was replaced as commander by Major Siegfried Freytag. Their victors may have been Spitfires from the Royal Canadian Air Force (RCAF) No. 401 Squadron which claimed two Bf 109s from the Stab of JG 77 shot down over Duisburg that day. One of these victories was credited to Flying Officer John MacKay.

Wiese surrendered to U.S. forces at the end of the war and was handed over by the Americans to the Soviet Red Army on 6 September 1945. Wiese spent over four years in Soviet prisoner of war camps and was released on 28 November 1949. He was officially credited with 133 victories claimed in 480 combat missions. Additionally, he had 25 more unconfirmed claims. Among his claims were over 50 Il-2 Sturomoviks. Soviet fighter pilots therefore greatly respected Wiese, and referred to him as the "Lion of Kuban", a name he earned during combat over the Kuban bridgehead.

== Later life ==
After the war in 1956, Wiese joined the Bundeswehr, the armed forces of the Federal Republic of Germany, and worked for the Military History Research Office. He retired on 10 November 1970 holding the rank of Oberstleutnant. Wiese died on 16 August 1991 in Kirchzarten and was buried in Berlin-Nikolassee.

== Summary of career ==
=== Aerial victory claims ===
According to US historian David T. Zabecki, Wiese was credited with 133 aerial victories. Spick also lists him with 133 aerial victories claimed in approximately 480 combat missions, and a mission-to-claim ratio of 3.61. Mathews and Foreman, authors of Luftwaffe Aces — Biographies and Victory Claims, researched the German Federal Archives and state that Wiese was credited with 118 aerial victories, plus 27 further unconfirmed claims. All of his victories were claimed on the Eastern Front.

Victory claims were logged to a map-reference (PQ = Planquadrat), for example "PQ 49423". The Luftwaffe grid map (Jägermeldenetz) covered all of Europe, western Russia and North Africa and was composed of rectangles measuring 15 minutes of latitude by 30 minutes of longitude, an area of about 360 square miles (930 km^{2}). These sectors were then subdivided into 36 smaller units to give a location area 3 km × 4 km (1.9 mi × 2.5 mi) in size.

Chronicle of aerial victories
This and the ♠ (Ace of spades) indicates those aerial victories which made Wiese an "ace-in-a-day", a term which designates a fighter pilot who has shot down five or more airplanes in a single day. This and the – (dash) indicates unconfirmed aerial victory claims for which Wiese did not receive credit. This and the ! (exclamation mark) indicates those aerial victories listed by Prien, Stemmer, Rodeike and Bock. This and the # (hash mark) indicates those aerial victories listed by Mathews and Foreman. This and the ? (question mark) indicates an unnumbered claim listed by Prien, Stemmer, Rodeike and Bock.
Claim!	Claim#	Date	Time	Type	Location	Claim!	Claim#	Date	Time	Type	Location
– Stab of Jagdgeschwader 52 – Operation Barbarossa — 22 June – 5 December 1941
1	1	23 September 1941	17:37	DB-3							
– Stab of Jagdgeschwader 52 – Eastern Front — March – April 1942
2	2	30 March 1942	11:45	R-10 (Seversky)		5	5	20 April 1942	14:55	I-61 (MiG-3)	
3	3	19 April 1942	11:47	I-153		6	6	21 April 1942	15:25	I-301 (LaGG-3)	
4	4	19 April 1942	15:21	I-61 (MiG-3)		7	7	22 April 1942	06:55	I-301 (LaGG-3)	
– Stab of Jagdgeschwader 52 – Eastern Front — May 1942
8	8	2 June 1942	12:25	I-16							
– 2. Staffel of Jagdgeschwader 52 – Eastern Front — July 1942 – 3 February 1943
	—	2 July 1942	—	LaGG-3		30	30	25 October 1942	11:23	Il-2	PQ 49423; 25 km (16 mi) east of Stalingrad
9	9	5 July 1942	13:02	Boston		31	31	25 October 1942	14:07	Il-2	PQ 49361; 10 km (6.2 mi) south of Stalingrad
	—	6 July 1942	—	LaGG-3		32	32	25 October 1942	14:12	Il-2	PQ 49362; 10 km (6.2 mi) south of Stalingrad
	—	6 July 1942	—	Pe-2		33	33	25 October 1942	14:14	Il-2	PQ 49334 south of Stalingrad
10	10	10 July 1942	13:55	LaGG-3		34	34	27 October 1942	16:17	La-5	PQ 49273; 15 km (9.3 mi) east of Stalingrad
11	11	3 August 1942	17:00	Pe-2	PQ 76583 vicinity of Temryuk		—	29 October 1942	—	unknown	
12	12	4 August 1942	05:20	LaGG-3	PQ 66652 vicinity of Malikut		—	29 October 1942	—	unknown	
13	13	5 August 1942	04:45	LaGG-3	PQ 66661; Kerch Strait, west of Zaporozhskaya	35	35	31 October 1942	06:05	Yak-1	PQ 49363; 10 km (6.2 mi) south of Stalingrad
14	14	11 August 1942	08:20	LaGG-3	PQ 75272 north of Krymsk	36	36	31 October 1942	09:55	LaGG-3	PQ 49413 vicinity of Krasnaya Sloboda
15	15	13 August 1942	12:50	LaGG-3	PQ 76422 northeast of Novorossiysk	37	37	31 October 1942	14:00	Yak-1	PQ 49412; 5 km (3.1 mi) east of Stalingrad
16	16	18 August 1942	16:50	I-180 (Yak-7)	PQ 54134 vicinity of Duminichi		—	31 October 1942	—	Yak-1	
	—	18 August 1942	—	Yak-7		38	38	2 November 1942	09:05	Yak-1	PQ 49273; 15 km (9.3 mi) east of Stalingrad
17	17	21 August 1942	14:22	Yak-1	PQ 64173	? (Note: According to Prien, Stemmer, Rodeike and Bock, Wiese claimed five confirmed aerial victories over Ilyushin Il-2 ground-attack aircraft on 16 December and another on 17 December 1942. However, these six claims are unnumbered. The authors additionally state that Wiese was credited with another aerial victory of unknown type in the timeframe 6 November to 31 December 1942. The first numbered claim is listed on 21 December 1942 and labeled as his 47th aerial victory.)	—	16 December 1942	—	Il-2	
18	18	23 August 1942	09:57	Yak-1	PQ 54263 vicinity of Uljanowo	?	—	16 December 1942	—	Il-2	
19	19	3 September 1942	14:54	Il-2	PQ 57712; Sea of Azov	?	—	16 December 1942	—	Il-2	
	—	3 September 1942	—	unknown		?	—	16 December 1942	—	Il-2	
	—	3 September 1942	—	unknown		?	—	16 December 1942	—	Il-2	
	—	3 September 1942	—	unknown		?	39	17 December 1942	13:32	Il-2	PQ 01342
20	20	5 September 1942	14:00	Il-2	PQ 46271		—	17 December 1942	—	MiG-3	
21	21	11 September 1942	11:10	Yak-1	PQ 47871		—	17 December 1942	—	MiG-3	
	—	12 September 1942	—	LaGG-3		?	—	6 November – 31 December 1942	—	unknown	
22	22	13 September 1942	16:14	Il-2	PQ 47592	47	40	21 December 1942	07:37	MiG-3? (Note: According to Mathews and Foreman claimed as a Mikoyan-Gurevich MiG-1.)	PQ 01564 south of Kamenka
23	23	26 September 1942	05:55	LaGG-3	PQ 30142	48	41	21 December 1942	07:38	MiG-3	PQ 10742
24	24	28 September 1942	05:47	Il-2	PQ 49262; 35–40 km (22–25 mi) east of Stalingrad	49	42	25 December 1942	13:02	Il-2	PQ 01771
25	25	29 September 1942	15:47	LaGG-3	PQ 49292; 40 km (25 mi) east of Stalingrad	50	43	25 December 1942	13:05	Il-2	PQ 01775
26	26	2 October 1942	11:34	Il-2	PQ 49271; 5 km (3.1 mi) east of Stalingrad	51	44	25 December 1942	13:08	Il-2	PQ 01753
27	27	9 October 1942	15:00	Yak-1	PQ 49733; 35–40 km (22–25 mi) north of Grebenka	52	45	29 December 1942	12:20	La-5	PQ 01234
28	28	14 October 1942	07:30	Yak-1	PQ 40581; 50 km (31 mi) north-northwest of Grebenka	53	46	29 December 1942	12:45	MiG-3	PQ 00134
29	29	17 October 1942	07:27	I-180 (Yak-7)	PQ 49272; 10 km (6.2 mi) east of Stalingrad						
– 2. Staffel of Jagdgeschwader 52 – Eastern Front — 4 February – June 1943
54	47	7 May 1943	12:34	Yak-1	PQ 35 Ost 71742, 8 km (5.0 mi) south of Bely Kolodez	66	59	30 May 1943	15:35	Il-2 m.H. (Note: The "m.H." refers to an Ilyushin Il-2 with rear gunner (mit Heckschütze).)	PQ 34 Ost 76893 south of Bakanskij
55	48	7 May 1943	18:25	LaGG-3	PQ 35 Ost 6130, 15 km (9.3 mi) southeast of Belgorod	67	60	30 May 1943	15:38	Il-2 m.H.	PQ 34 Ost 75233 west of Krymsk
56	49	9 May 1943	06:28	Yak-1	PQ 34 Ost 98853; 10 km (6.2 mi) south of Rostov	68	61	2 June 1943	13:30	Il-2 m.H.	PQ 34 Ost 75232 north of Krymsk
57	50	9 May 1943	15:25	Il-2 m.H.	PQ 35 Ost 61455; 15 km (9.3 mi) northeast of Belgorod	69	62	2 June 1943	13:32	La-5	PQ 34 Ost 75262, west of Krymskaja south of Krymsk
58	51	26 May 1943	05:55	Yak-1	PQ 34 Ost 86777 vicinity of Bondarenka	70	63	5 June 1943	18:15	Il-2 m.H.	PQ 34 Ost 75262, 5 km (3.1 mi) east of Moldawanskoje
59	52	26 May 1943	08:32	Pe-2	PQ 34 Ost 85112 north of Mertschanskaja	71	64	5 June 1943	18:18	Il-2 m.H.	PQ 34 Ost 75262, 3 km (1.9 mi) west of Krymskaja
60	53	26 May 1943	08:40	Spitfire	PQ 34 Ost 85152 east of Sorin	72	65	5 June 1943	18:22	Yak-1	PQ 34 Ost 75262, 4 km (2.5 mi) west of Krymskaja
61	54	26 May 1943	17:37	LaGG-3	PQ 34 Ost 75222 vicinity of Gladkowskaja Krassnyj	73	66	6 June 1943	17:38	Il-2 m.H.	PQ 34 Ost 76812
62	55	27 May 1943	18:28	Il-2 m.H.	PQ 34 Ost 75262 south of Krymsk	74	67	6 June 1943	17:42	Il-2 m.H.	PQ 34 Ost 76683 vicinity of Sswistelijnikoff
63	56	28 May 1943	18:05	Il-2 m.H.	PQ 34 Ost 75232 northwest of Krymsk	75	68	7 June 1943	09:22	La-5	PQ 34 Ost 76823 vicinity of Kalabatka
64	57	28 May 1943	18:08	Yak-1	PQ 34 Ost 75232 north of Krymsk	76	69	21 June 1943	17:14	Il-2 m.H.	PQ 34 Ost 76851 northeast of Varenikovskaya
65	58	28 May 1943	18:12	La-5	PQ 34 Ost 75234 vicinity of Krymsk						
– I. Gruppe of Jagdgeschwader 52 – Eastern Front — July – 31 December 1943
77♠	70	5 July 1943	03:47	Il-2 m.H.	PQ 35 Ost 61891; 20 km (12 mi) south-southwest of Bilyi Kolodiaz	102	87	17 July 1943	05:45	Il-2 m.H.	PQ 35 Ost 62742, 3 km (1.9 mi) west of Oboyan
78♠	71	5 July 1943	03:55	Il-2 m.H.	PQ 35 Ost 60123	103	88	17 July 1943	05:50	Il-2	PQ 35 Ost 62753, 5 km (3.1 mi) south of Oboyan
79♠	72	5 July 1943	04:03	Il-2 m.H.	PQ 35 Ost 60193	104	89	18 July 1943	17:52	Yak-1	PQ 34 Ost 88256, south of Marinovka vicinity of Kalinovka
80♠	73	5 July 1943	07:50	Il-2 m.H.	PQ 35 Ost 61321	105	90	18 July 1943	17:53	Yak-1	PQ 34 Ost 88256, south of Marinovka vicinity of Kalinovka
81♠	74	5 July 1943	08:12	Il-2 m.H.	PQ 35 Ost 61321	106	91	20 July 1943	07:25	Il-2 m.H.	PQ 34 Ost 88252, south of Marinovka; 25 km (16 mi) east-northeast of Kuteinykove
82♠	75	5 July 1943	09:40	Il-2	PQ 35 Ost 61352	107	92	22 July 1943	15:10	Yak-1	PQ 34 Ost 88259, southeast of Kalinovka
83♠	76	5 July 1943	15:25	Il-2 m.H.	PQ 35 Ost 61812	108	93	23 July 1943	19:01	Yak-1	PQ 34 Ost 89889; 20 km (12 mi) north of Jalisawehino
84♠	77	5 July 1943	18:30	Il-2	PQ 35 Ost 61622, 3 km (1.9 mi) south of Poljana	109	94	27 July 1943	15:14	Il-2 m.H.	PQ 34 Ost 88258, 3 km (1.9 mi) west of Kalinovka
85♠	78	5 July 1943	18:33	Il-2 m.H.	PQ 35 Ost 61622, 4 km (2.5 mi) south of Poljana	110	95	27 July 1943	15:18	Il-2 m.H.	PQ 34 Ost 88294, 6 km (3.7 mi) south-southeast of Kalinovka
86♠	79	5 July 1943	18:40	Il-2 m.H.	PQ 35 Ost 61624, 3 km (1.9 mi) northeast of Wolkowo	111	96	13 October 1943	10:23	Il-2 m.H.	PQ 34 Ost 58182; 5 km (3.1 mi) southeast of Zaporizhia
87♠	80	5 July 1943	18:45	Il-2	PQ 35 Ost 61651, 3 km (1.9 mi) southwest of Wolkowo	112	97	13 October 1943	10:26	Il-2 m.H.	PQ 34 Ost 58162; 20 km (12 mi) east of Zaporizhia
88♠	81	5 July 1943	18:50	Il-2	PQ 35 Ost 61621, 2 km (1.2 mi) northeast of Toplinka	113	98	14 October 1943	11:58	Yak-1	PQ 34 Ost 58154, south of Saporoshkaja northeast of Zaporizhia
—		5 July 1943	18:55	Il-2	vicinity of Toplinka	114	99	19 October 1943	07:58	Pe-2	PQ 34 Ost 49312 vicinity of Borodajewka
89	82	6 July 1943	18:15	La-5	PQ 35 Ost 61242, vicinity of Leski; 10 km (6.2 mi) south of Prokhorovka	115♠	100	20 October 1943	10:21	Il-2 m.H.	PQ 34 Ost 48283; 25 km (16 mi) west of Zaporizhia
90		6 July 1943	18:25	La-5	PQ 35 Ost 61243, south of Luchki	116♠	101	20 October 1943	10:23	Il-2 m.H.	PQ 34 Ost 48281; 25 km (16 mi) west of Zaporizhia
91	—	7 July 1943	09:27	La-5	PQ 35 Ost 61253	117♠	102	20 October 1943	10:26	Il-2	PQ 34 Ost 48281; 25 km (16 mi) west of Zaporizhia
92	—	7 July 1943	—	Il-2		118♠	103	20 October 1943	10:33	Il-2	PQ 34 Ost 48291; 20 km (12 mi) west of Zaporizhia
93	—	7 July 1943	—	Il-2		119♠	104	20 October 1943	10:35	Il-2	PQ 34 Ost 48283; 25 km (16 mi) west of Zaporizhia
94	—	7 July 1943	—	Il-2		120♠	105	20 October 1943	12:09	Il-2 m.H.	PQ 34 Ost 48294; 20 km (12 mi) west of Zaporizhia
95	—	7 July 1943	—	Il-2		121♠	106	20 October 1943	12:10	Il-2 m.H.	PQ 34 Ost 58181; 5 km (3.1 mi) southeast of Zaporizhia
96	—	7 July 1943	—	Il-2		122	107	23 October 1943	15:23	La-5	PQ 34 Ost 49842; 40 km (25 mi) south-southwest of Werchnedjeprowak
97	—	7 July 1943	—	Il-2		123	108	28 October 1943	10:13	Il-2 m.H.	PQ 34 Ost 47193; 20 km (12 mi) northwest of Ivanovka
98	83	16 July 1943	05:25	Il-2 m.H.	PQ 35 Ost 61212, 10 km (6.2 mi) southwest of Prokhorovka	124	109	28 October 1943	10:15	Il-2 m.H.	PQ 34 Ost 47193; 20 km (12 mi) northwest of Ivanovka
99	84	16 July 1943	05:30	Il-2	PQ 35 Ost 61212, 10 km (6.2 mi) southwest of Prokhorovka	125	110	28 October 1943	10:18	Il-2 m.H.	PQ 34 Ost 47271; 20 km (12 mi) north of Ivanovka
100	85	17 July 1943	05:40	Il-2 m.H.	PQ 35 Ost 61121, 5 km (3.1 mi) northeast of Bogatoje	126	111	28 October 1943	10:21	Il-2 m.H.	PQ 34 Ost 47242; 20 km (12 mi) north of Ivanovka
101	86	17 July 1943	05:41	Il-2	PQ 35 Ost 62753, west of Alisowka; 10 km (6.2 mi) south of Oboyan	—	—	29 October 1943	—	La-5	
– I. Gruppe of Jagdgeschwader 52 – Eastern Front — 1 January – February 1944
127	112	6 January 1944	14:27	Il-2 m.H.	10 km (6.2 mi) west of Losowatka	131	116	26 January 1944	07:59	Il-2 m.H.	PQ 34 Ost 66564 vicinity of Kerch
128	113	7 January 1944	11:35	Il-2 m.H.	PQ 34 Ost 29372, 2 km (1.2 mi) north of Gruskoje	132	117	22 February 1944	08:05	Yak-9	PQ 34 Ost 38664; 30 km (19 mi) southeast of Apostolove
129	114	7 January 1944	11:38	Il-2 m.H.	PQ 34 Ost 29391, 10 km (6.2 mi) northwest of Kirovograd	133	118	22 February 1944	08:10	Yak-9	PQ 34 Ost 48712; 45 km (28 mi) south-southwest of Nikopol
130	115	8 January 1944	13:03	Yak-9	PQ 34 Ost 29514; 20 km (12 mi) north-northwest of Bobrinez						

=== Awards ===
- Iron Cross (1939)
  - 2nd Class (27 September 1941)
  - 1st Class (1 May 1942)
- Front Flying Clasp of the Luftwaffe
  - in Silver (11 October 1941)
  - in Gold (13 July 1942)
- Honour Goblet of the Luftwaffe (Ehrenpokal der Luftwaffe) on 16 November 1942 as Hauptmann and Staffelkapitän (Note: According to Obermaier and Thomas on 6 November 1942.)
- German Cross in Gold on 5 December 1942 as Hauptmann in the I./Jagdgeschwader 52 (Note: According to Obermaier and Stockert on 8 February 1943.)
- Knight's Cross of the Iron Cross with Oak Leaves
  - Knight's Cross on 5 January 1943 as Hauptmann and Staffelkapitän of the 2./Jagdgeschwader 52
  - 418th Oak Leaves on 2 March 1944 as Major and Gruppenkommandeur of the I./Jagdgeschwader 52

== Notes ==
Military offices
Preceded by Oberstleutnant Johannes Steinhoff	Commander of Jagdgeschwader 77 "Herz As"; 1 December 1944 – 25 December 1944	Succeeded by Major Siegfried Freytag
