= Johannes Steinhoff =

German general and fighter pilot during World War II (1913–1994)

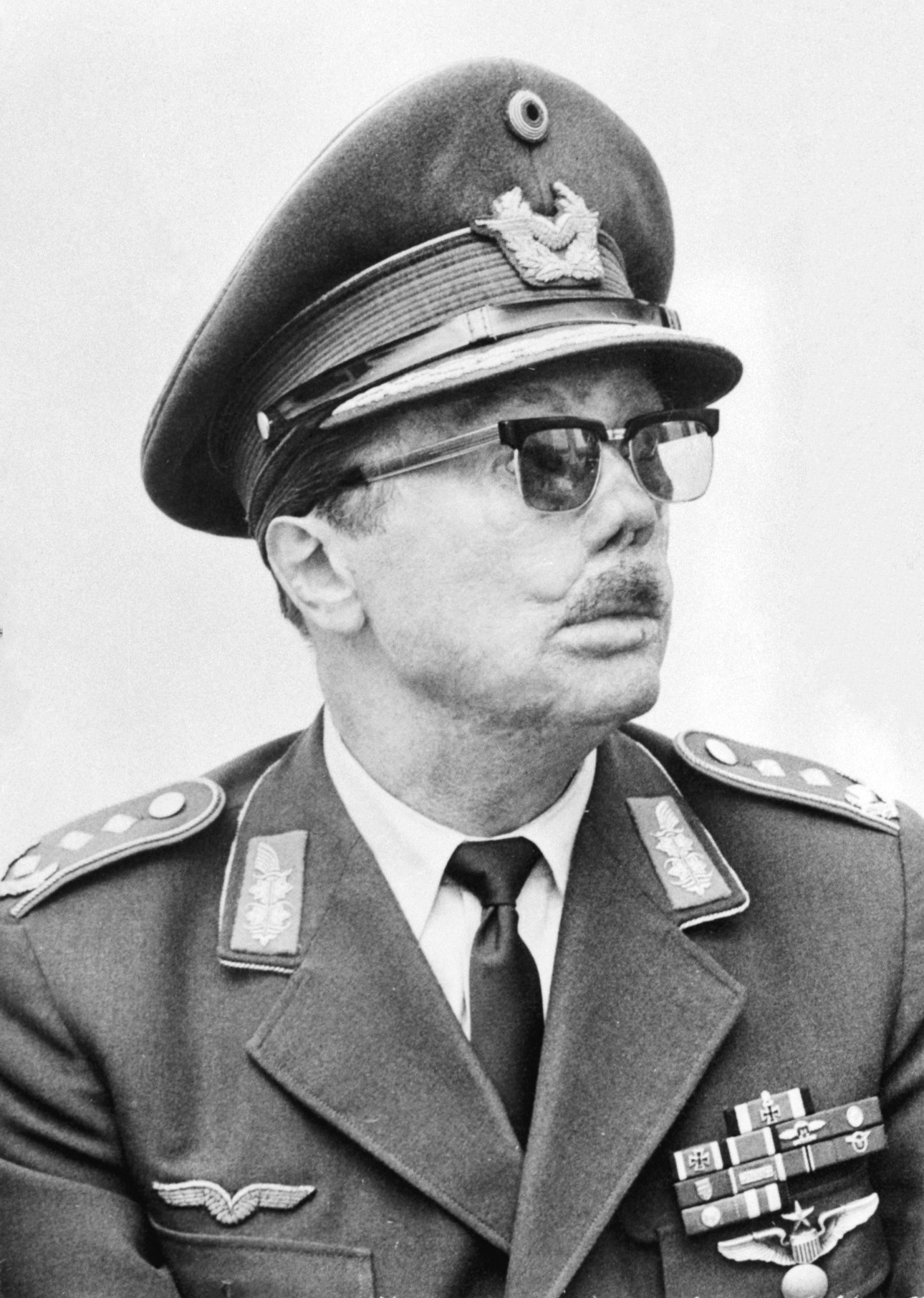
- Steinhoff in 1966

Chairman of the NATO Military Committee
- In office 1971–1974
- Preceded by: Sir Nigel Henderson
- Succeeded by: Sir Peter Hill-Norton

Inspector of the Air Force
- In office 1966–1970
- Preceded by: Werner Panitzki
- Succeeded by: Günther Rall

Personal details
- Born: 15 September 1913 Bottendorf, Province of Saxony, Prussia, Germany
- Died: 21 February 1994 (aged 80) Wachtberg-Pech, North Rhine-Westphalia, Germany
- Resting place: Cemetery in Villip, Wachtberg
- Spouse: Ursula Steinhoff
- Relations: Ludwig Hahn (brother-in-law); Michael Bird (son-in-law)
- Awards: Knight's Cross of the Iron Cross with Oak Leaves and Swords; Great Cross of the Order of Merit of the Federal Republic of Germany; Grand Officer of the Order of Merit of the Italian Republic; American Legion of Merit; French Legion of Honour
- Nickname: Macky

Military service
- Allegiance: Nazi Germany (to 1945); West Germany
- Branch/service: Luftwaffe; German Air Force
- Years of service: 1934–1945; 1955–1974
- Rank: Oberst (Wehrmacht); General (Bundeswehr)
- Unit: JG 26, JG 52, JG 77, Kommando Nowotny, JG 7 and JV 44
- Commands: II./JG 52, JG 77 and JG 7
- Battles/wars: See battles World War II: Battle of the Heligoland Bight; Battle of France; Battle of Britain; Operation Barbarossa; Defence of the Reich; Cold War

Johannes "Macky" Steinhoff (15 September 1913 – 21 February 1994) was a Nazi Luftwaffe fighter ace during World War II, Nazi general, and NATO official. He was one of very few Luftwaffe pilots who survived to fly operationally through the whole of the war period 1939–45 until he was severely burned during a failed take-off. Steinhoff was also one of the highest-scoring pilots with 176 victories, and one of the first to fly the Messerschmitt Me 262 jet fighter in combat as a member of the Jagdverband 44 squadron led by Adolf Galland. Steinhoff was decorated with the Knight's Cross of the Iron Cross with Oak Leaves and Swords, and later received the Great Cross of the Order of Merit of the Federal Republic of Germany and several foreign awards including the American Legion of Merit and the French Legion of Honour. He played a role in the so-called Fighter Pilots' Revolt late in the war, when several senior air force officers confronted Hermann Göring.

Steinhoff joined the West German government's Rearmament Office as a consultant on military aviation in 1952 and became one of the principal officials tasked with rebuilding the German Air Force through the Cold War. In retirement, Steinhoff became a widely read author of books on German military aviation during the Second World War and the experiences of the German people at that time.

== Early years ==
Johannes Steinhoff was born on 15 September 1913 in Bottendorf, Thuringia, the son of an agricultural mill-worker and his traditional housewife. He had two brothers, Bernd and Wolf, and two sisters, Greta and Charlotte. His sister Charlotte married Ludwig Hahn, the Kommandeur of the Sicherheitspolizei (Security Police) and Sicherheitsdienst (Security Service) in occupied Warsaw, who participated in the evacuation and destruction of the Warsaw Ghetto.

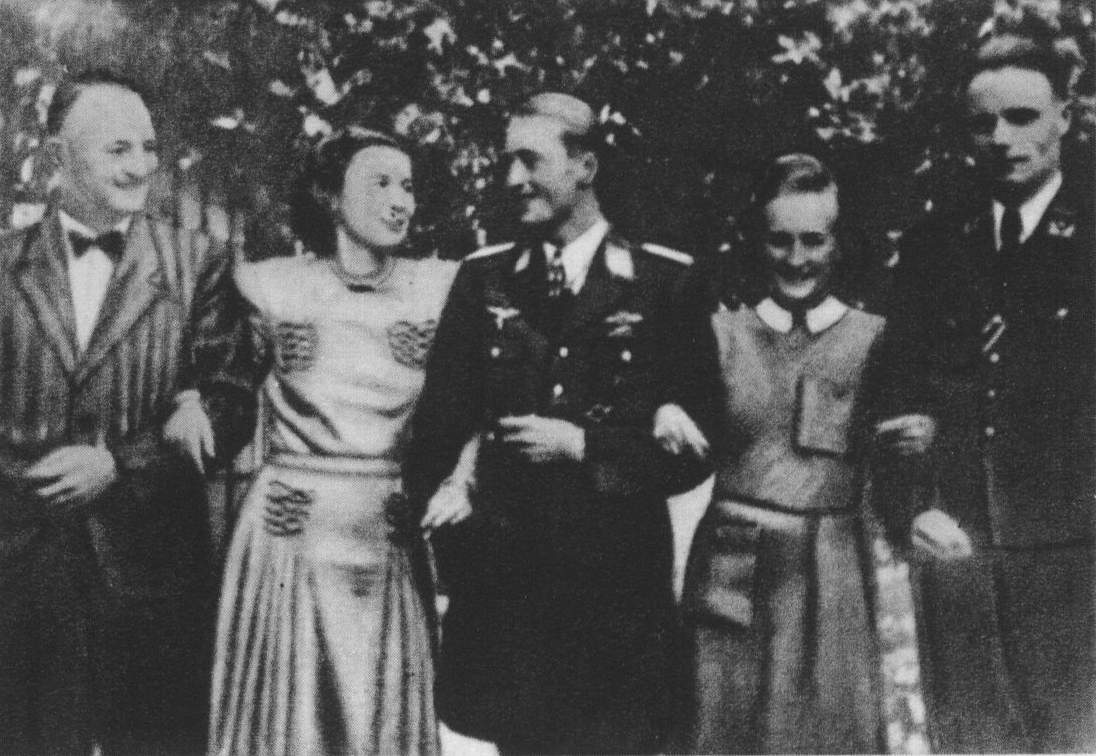
Hahn (right), with his wife Charlotte and Steinhoff (centre).

Steinhoff graduated from the Klosterschule Roßleben convent school after having "studied the classics and languages such as French, English, Latin and Greek," and from 1932–1934 he read philology at the University of Jena, where he was a member of the Landsmannschaft Suevia academic fencing society and male fraternity. Steinhoff enlisted in the Nazi Kriegsmarine, where he served for one year alongside his friend Dietrich Hrabak as a naval flying cadet before transferring to the Luftwaffe in 1936.

Steinhoff was promoted to Leutnant (second lieutenant) on 1 April 1936. He married his wife Ursula on 29 April 1939 and they had a son, Wolf and a daughter, Ursula. Ursula married economics professor and (now-retired) Colorado State Senator Michael Bird. On 1 January 1939, Steinhoff was promoted to Oberleutnant (first lieutenant).

In the early summer of 1939, the Luftwaffe began experimenting with night fighter procedures for single engine aircraft. Due to a lack of experienced flyers, operations were restricted to evening and early morning hours. On 1 August, Steinhoff was appointed Staffelkapitän (squadron leader) of 11. (Nachtjagd) Staffel (squadron) of Lehrgeschwader 2 (LG 2—2nd Demonstration Wing) which was based at Greifswald. Initially, the squadron was equipped with the Arado Ar 68 fighter before it was reequipped with the Messerschmitt Bf 109 D-1. The unit was subordinated to the Stab (headquarters unit) of Kampfgeschwader 2 (KG 2—2nd Bomber Wing).

== World War II ==
World War II in Europe began on Friday 1 September 1939, when German forces invaded Poland. That day, Steinhoff was transferred to Jagdgeschwader 26 "Schlageter" (JG 26—26th Fighter Wing), which had been named after Albert Leo Schlageter on 1 May 1939. He was appointed Staffelkapitän of a newly created night fighter unit named 10. (Nacht) Staffel of JG 26 which was based at Bonn-Hangelar, near Sankt Augustin, and equipped with the Bf 109 D. On 12 November, the unit was moved to Jever Airfield. On 18 December, Royal Air Force (RAF) Bomber Command launched an attack on German warships assumed to be at Wilhelmshaven in what became known as the Battle of the Heligoland Bight. The RAF attack force was intercepted and Steinhoff was credited with the destruction of two Vickers Wellington bombers from 57th Squadron and Number 3 Group which he claimed to have shot down 25–35 kilometers (16–22 miles) south-southwest of Heligoland.

On 3 February 1940, a new night fighter unit was created by consolidating three independent single engine fighter squadrons at Jever Airfield. This unit was labelled IV. (Nacht) Gruppe (4th night group) of Jagdgeschwader 2 "Richthofen" (JG 2—2nd Fighter Wing) and placed under the leadership of Hauptmann Albert Blumensaat. In consequence, 10. (Nacht) Staffel of JG 26 became the 11. (Nacht) Staffel of JG 2 which was headed by Steinhoff and was based at Hage. On 23 April, 11. (Nacht) and 12. (Nacht) Staffeln of JG 2 were ordered to Aalborg Airfield in support of Operation Weserübung, the German assault on Denmark and Norway. The two squadrons returned to Germany on 9 May in preparation for the Battle of France. At the start of the campaign on 10 May, 11. (Nacht) Staffel was based at Cologne Butzweilerhof Airfield where it supported Army Group B in the Battle of the Netherlands. That day, Steinhof claimed a Bristol Blenheim bomber near The Hague and a second near Düsseldorf.

In August 1940, he was transferred to 4. Staffel of Jagdgeschwader 52 (JG 52—52nd Fighter Wing) where he replaced Oberleutnant Heinz Schumann as Staffelkapitän. The Staffel was subordinated to II. Gruppe of JG 52 which was headed by Hauptmann Wilhelm Ensslen. At the time, the Gruppe was based at Peuplingues near the English Channel and were fighting the RAF during the Battle of Britain. Steinhoff claimed his fifth aerial victory on 30 September. He was credited with the destruction of a Supermarine Spitfire fighter over Dorking. II. Gruppe was withdrawn from the Channel Front on 2 November and moved to München Gladbach, present-day Mönchengladbach, on 5 November for a period of rest and replenishment. The Gruppe had also lost its commanding officer, Ensslen, who was killed in action on 2 November. Ensslen was replaced by Hauptmann Erich Woitke. On 22 December, II. Gruppe was ordered to Leeuwarden Airfield where they were tasked with flying fighter patrols along the Dutch North Sea coast. On 15 January 1941, the Gruppe moved to Ypenburg Airfield where they stayed until 10 February. The Gruppe then moved to Berck-sur-Mer on 14 February, where Steinhoff claimed to have shot down another Spitfire in aerial combat, near Dungeness. On 17 May, II. Gruppe reached Raversijde, its last airfield near the English Channel. Two days later, Steinhoff claimed to have shot down a further two Spitfires on a mission to Canterbury. On 9 June, the air elements of II. Gruppe began relocating east.

=== Operation Barbarossa ===
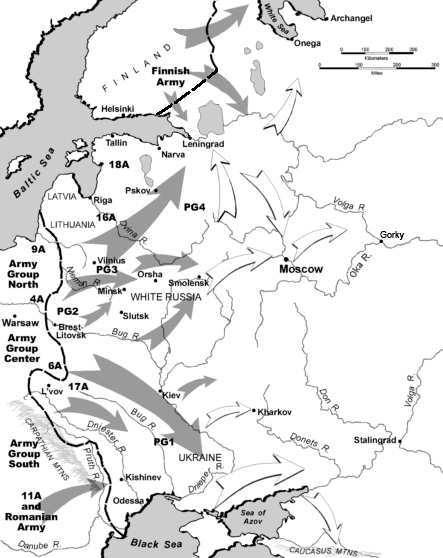
Map indicating Operation Barbarossa's attack plan

In preparation for Operation Barbarossa, the German invasion of the Soviet Union, II. Gruppe of JG 52, without a period of replenishment in Germany, was ordered to airfields close to the German-Soviet demarcation line. While the Gruppenstab (group headquarters unit) and 4. Staffel were based at Suwałki in northeastern Poland, 5. and 6. Staffel were transferred to a forward airfield at Sobolewo. For the invasion, II. Gruppe of JG 52 was subordinated to the Geschwaderstab (headquarters unit) of Jagdgeschwader 27 (JG 27—27th Fighter Wing). The Geschwader was part of the VIII. Fliegerkorps commanded by Generaloberst Wolfram Freiherr von Richthofen which supported the northern wing of Army Group Centre.

On 22 June, the German forces launched the attack on the Soviet Union which opened the Eastern Front. The Gruppe supported the advancing 9th Army and 3rd Panzer Group in their attack on the border fortifications east and southeast of Suwałki. That day, Steinhoff claimed a Soviet Polikarpov I-153 fighter shot down near Varėna in Lithuania. On 25 June, the Gruppe moved to an airfield at Varėna which had previously been occupied by the Soviet Air Forces (VVS—Voyenno-Vozdushnye Sily). The next day, Steinhoff claimed an Ilyushin DB-3 bomber shot down south of Varėna. On 28 June, the Gruppe moved to Maladzyechna, supporting the advance 3rd Panzer Group near Barysaw.

On 24 August, II. Gruppe was ordered to an airfield at Spasskaya Polist on the river Polist, south of Chudovo and north of Novgorod on Lake Ilmen, supporting the 18th Army in its advance towards the Neva and Lake Ladoga. Here, Steinhoff claimed his 35th aerial victory on 29 August, for which he was awarded the Knight's Cross of the Iron Cross (Ritterkreuz des Eisernen Kreuzes) the following day.

=== Eastern Front ===
On 24 January 1942, having been withdrawn from the Eastern Front, II. Gruppe arrived in Jesau near Königsberg, present-day Kaliningrad in Russia, for a period of recuperation and replenishment. That day, the commander of the Gruppe, Woitke, was transferred. On 1 March, Steinhoff became its new Gruppenkommandeur (group commander). In consequence, command of 4. Staffel was handed to Oberleutnant Gerhard Barkhorn. In Jesau, the Gruppe received many factory new Bf 109 F-4 aircraft. On 14 April, II. Gruppe received orders to move to Pilsen, present-day Plzeň in the Czech Republic, for relocation to the Eastern Front.

II. Gruppe was ordered to Tusov on 20 August which is located approximately 25 kilometers (16 miles) southwest of Kalach-na-Donu on the western bank of the Don where the Gruppe operated in the combat area of Stalingrad. Here, Steinhoff claimed his 100th aerial victory on 31 August when he shot down two LaGG-3 fighters. He was the 18th Luftwaffe pilot to achieve the century mark. On 1 September, II. Gruppe was ordered to and airfield at Kerch on the Kerch Peninsula. The objective was to capture the Taman Peninsula and Novorossiysk. Here, Steinhoff was credited with the destruction of a minesweeper and the sinking of a motorboat.

On 2 September, Steinhoff was awarded the Knight's Cross of the Iron Cross with Oak Leaves (Ritterkreuz des Eisernen Kreuzes mit Eichenlaub). He was the 115th member of the German armed forces to be so honoured. On 4 November, Steinhoff, together with Alfred Druschel, Ernst-Wilhelm Reinert, Günther Rall and Max Stotz received the Oak Leaves from Adolf Hitler personally. On 11 December, during the Battle of Stalingrad, Steinhoff was hit by anti-aircraft artillery in his Bf 109 G-2 (Werknummer 13853—factory number), resulting in a forced landing near Oblivskaya.

=== Wing commander ===
Steinhoff left JG 52 on 24 March 1943 and handed over II. Gruppe to Hauptmann Helmut Kühle. On 1 April, he was given command of Jagdgeschwader 77 (JG 77—77th Fighter Wing) as Geschwaderkommodore (wing commander) after its former commander, Major Joachim Müncheberg, had been killed in action on 23 March. Steinhoff took command JG 77 on 3 April. At the time, the Geschwader was based at an airfield north of Sfax, Tunisia and was fighting in the North African campaign. The following day, Steinhoff claimed his only aerial victory in North Africa when he shot down a Spitfire fighter on a mission to El Guettar. On 5 April, he was shot down by a Spitfire fighter resulting in a forced landing at La Fauconnerie which destroyed his Bf 109 G-6 (Werknummer 16492).

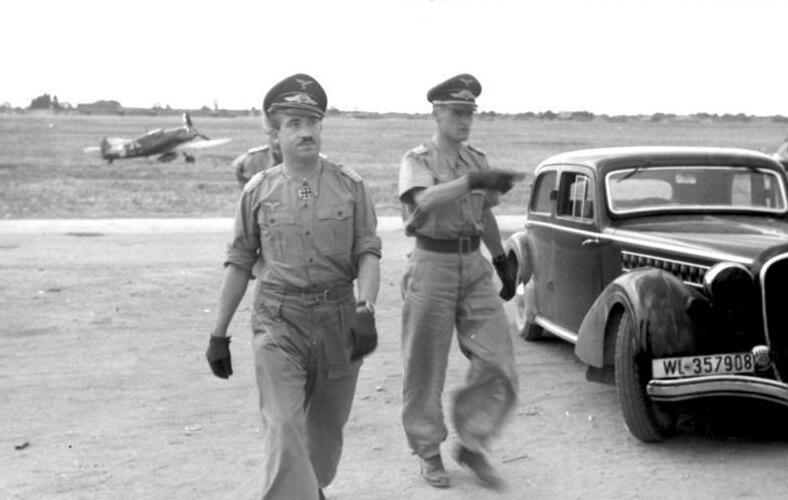
Galland and Lützow, Sicily 25 June 1943

Before noon on 25 June, Luftwaffe radar on Monte Erice picked up a large formation of United States Army Air Forces (USAAF) four-engine bombers north of Sicily. The Luftwaffe initially assumed that the bombers were heading for Naples. In reality, the 124 Boeing B-17 Flying Fortress bombers attacked Messina, causing significant damage. The Luftwaffe aerial defences were coordinated by Generalmajor Adolf Galland, the General der Jagdflieger (General of the Fighter Force), and his Inspekteur der Jadgflieger Süd (Inspector of Fighter Pilots South), Oberst Günther Lützow, personally. Galland had intended to consolidate fighters from both JG 77 and Jagdgeschwader 53 (JG 53—53rd Fighter Wing) and to vector the fighters in a closed formation to a point of interception. Because the target was mistaken, the bombers could only be intercepted on their return. Galland scrambled approximately 80 fighters from Stab, I., II. Gruppe of JG 77 and Gruppe of JG 53 at 12:55. Due to hazy weather conditions, the German formation was spread out, and failed to find the bombers quickly. Fuel was already running low when the bombers were spotted approximately 150 kilometers (93 miles) northwest of Trapani. Only a few Luftwaffe fighters reached the bombers, including Steinhoff who shot down a B-17.

In late 1943, Steinhoff had initiated disciplinary measures against a number of pilots from JG 77. These pilots were accused of "cowardice before the enemy", demoted and transferred to defense of the Reich duties for redemption in combat. Steinhoff's disciplinary action included the pilots Major Heinrich Bär, Hauptmann Lutz-Wilhelm Burckhardt, Leutnant Ernst-Wilhelm Reinert, Oberfeldwebel Alexander Preinfalk, and Oberfeldwebel Herbert Kaiser.

Steinhoff was promoted to Oberstleutnant (lieutenant colonel) on 1 April 1944. On 14 July, Steinhoff's Bf 109 G-6 was damaged in aerial combat with Spitfire fighters and Martin B-26 Marauder bombers near Modena. In this engagement, Steinhoff claimed one of the B-26 damaged. (Note: According to the authors Shores, Massimello, Guest, Olynyk, Bock and Thomas, this action took place on 13 July 1944.) Following a meetings held by the Jagdfliegerführer Oberitalien (Fighter Leader Northern Italy) and by the staff of Luftflotte 2 (Air Fleet 2), orders were issued on 23 July to withdraw I. Gruppe of JG 77 and I. Gruppe of Jagdgeschwader 4 (JG 4—4th Fighter Wing) to Germany for a period of rest and replenishment. The following day, Steinhoff flew to Berlin for a meeting held by the General der Jagdflieger. Steinhoff stayed in Germany until early September 1944 in Germany. During this stay on 28 July, Steinhoff was awarded the Knight's Cross of the Iron Cross with Oak Leaves and Swords (Ritterkreuz des Eisernen Kreuzes mit Eichenlaub und Schwertern). He was the 82nd member of the German armed forces to be so honored. On 9 September, the Geschwaderstab of JG 77 was withdrawn from Italy and relocated to Pișcolt where it came under the control of Luftflotte 4 (Air Fleet 2) fighting on the Eastern Front.

On 10 October, JG 77 relocated to an airfields near Berlin. The Geschwaderstab and I. Gruppe were based at Schönwalde, II. Gruppe at Eggersdorf while III. Gruppe was based at Neuruppin. In late October, the Geschwaderstab received factory new Bf 109 G-10 fighter aircraft. On 7 November, Steinhoff left JG 77 and was replaced by Major Johannes Wiese. In total, Steinhoff had flown 100 combat missions and had claimed eleven aerial victories while serving with JG 77. On 11 November, Reichsmarschall Hermann Göring, in his role as commander-in-chief of the Luftwaffe, organized a meeting of high-ranking Luftwaffe officers, including General der Jagdflieger Galland and Steinhoff. The meeting, also referred to as the "Areopag", was held at the Luftkriegsakademie (air war academy) at Berlin-Gatow. This Luftwaffe version of the Greek Areopagus—a court of justice—aimed at finding solutions to the deteriorating air war situation over Germany. At this meeting, Galland asked Steinhoff if he would be interested in commanding the first jet fighter unit.

=== Flying the Messerschmitt Me 262 ===
Jagdgeschwader 7 "Nowotny" (JG 7—7th Fighter Wing) "Nowotny" was the first operational jet fighter wing in the world and was named after Walter Nowotny, who was killed in action on 8 November 1944. Nowotny had been assessing the Messerschmitt Me 262 jet aircraft under operational conditions. JG 7 was equipped with the Me 262, an aircraft which was heavily armed and faster than any Allied fighter. Galland hoped that the Me 262 would compensate for the Allies' numerical superiority. On 12 November 1944, the Oberkommando der Luftwaffe (OKL—Air Force High Command) ordered JG 7 to be equipped with the Me 262. Following the exchange with Steinhoff at the "Areopag", Galland appointed Steinhoff as its first Geschwaderkommodore.

Steinhoff was allowed to hand-pick several Staffelkapitäne, including Heinz Bär and Gerhard Barkhorn. After the heavy losses suffered during Operation Bodenplatte (Unternehmen Bodenplatte), Steinhoff and other fighter leaders fell into disfavour following the so-called 'Fighter Pilots' Revolt' against what was perceived as the incompetence of Luftwaffe high command and Göring in particular. Along with several others, Steinhoff was relieved of his command for challenging Göring's leadership. On 26 December, Steinhoff was replaced by Major Theodor Weissenberger as commander of JG 7.

After a brief period spent in internal exile, Steinhoff transferred to the Jet Experten unit Jagdverband 44 (JV 44—44th Fighter Detachment) being formed by his close friend and confidant Adolf Galland in early 1945. Steinhoff initially acted as a de facto recruiting officer, persuading a number of veteran Luftwaffe aces to join the unit, some coming out of the Fighter Pilots' Rest Home at Bad Wiessee to do so. Steinhoff scored six confirmed kills with the unit. (Note: For a list of Luftwaffe Jet aces see List of German World War II jet aces) Steinhoff survived nearly 1,000 combat missions, only to see his flying career come to an end on the ground.

On 18 April 1945, elements of the USAAF Eighth, Ninth and Fifteenth Air Force attacked railway targets and fuel depots in southern Germany and in the area of Prague and Pilsen. To defend against this attack, JV 44 prepared six Me 262 fighters, half of them equipped with the R4M unguided air-to-air rockets. The six Me 262 fighters were grouped in two flights of three aircraft each, referred to as a Kette (Vic formation) by the Luftwaffe. The first Kette was led by Galland, and included Oberleutnant Franz Stigler and Leutnant Klaus Neumann. While Steinhoff led the second Kette with Hauptmann Walter Krupinski and Leutnant Gottfried Fährmann. Galland took off first, with Stigler next followed by Neumann. Next came Steinhoff, Krupinski to his left and Fährmann to his right. During acceleration, Steinhoff's left wheel struck debris, causing his Me 262 to break out to left, nearly causing a collision with Krupinski who managed to lift off just in time. Steinhoff's Me 262 however ran off the runway and exploded in flames.

This accident left Steinhoff permanently disfigured after receiving major burns across most of his body. Steinhoff spent two years in hospital, and years of reconstructive surgery, with his eyelids being rebuilt by British surgeon George Henry Morley at the Princess Mary's Royal Air Force Hospital Halton after the war, his 69th surgery.

His wartime record was 176 aircraft claimed destroyed, of which 152 were on the Eastern Front, 12 on the Western Front and 12 in the Mediterranean. He also flew 993 operational sorties. Steinhoff was shot down 12 times but bailed out only once. Explaining his preference to remain with his damaged aircraft, Steinhoff admitted, "I bailed out only once. I never trusted the parachutes. I always landed my damaged planes, hoping not to get bounced on the way down when I lost power".

== Later life and service ==
Following World War II, Steinhoff continued to undergo surgery until he was released from a hospital in 1947. He then worked in ceramic painting and for a marketing firm in Munich before he became a member of the German delegation working on the Treaty establishing the European Defence Community. Steinhoff then entered the Amt Blank (Blank Agency), named after Theodor Blank, the forerunner of the German Federal Ministry of Defense. Steinhoff then transferred to the newly created German Air Force, at the time referred to as the Bundesluftwaffe. He was among the first three Bundesluftwaffe pilots to receive jet aircraft training. This group also included Dietrich Hrabak and Kurt Kuhlmey. All three of them were trained by the United States Air Force (USAF) in the USA. On 1 October 1958, Steinhoff was promoted to Brigadegeneral (brigadier general).

=== With the German Air Force and NATO ===
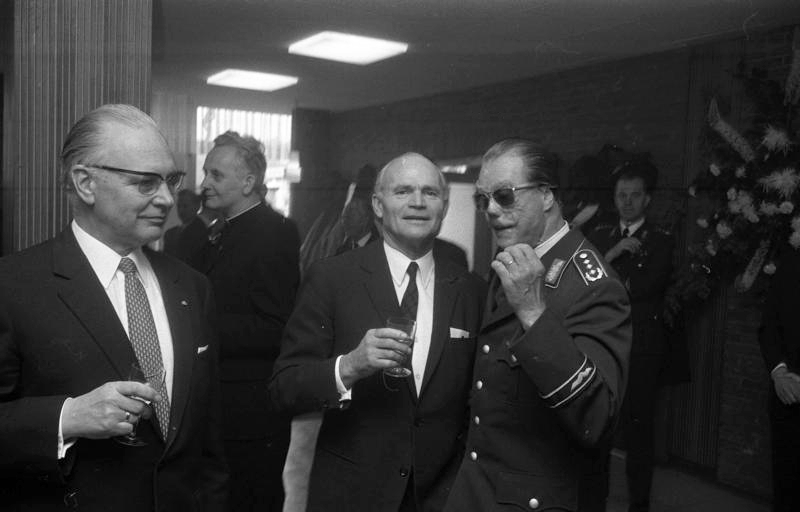
Johannes Steinhoff at NATO

Steinhoff was invited by West Germany's new interim government to rebuild the Bundesluftwaffe within NATO, eventually rising to the rank of full general. Steinhoff became the German Military Representative to the NATO Military Committee in 1960. In this capacity he was promoted to Generalmajor (major general) on 1 February 1961. On 4 December 1963, Steinhoff was appointed commander of the 4. Luftwaffendivision (4th Air Force Division) in Aurich, serving in this role until 14 April 1965 when command was transferred to Generalmajor Herbert Wehnelt. Steinhoff then served as Acting Commander Allied Air Forces Central Europe in NATO 1965–1966, as Inspector of the Air Force 1966–1970 and as Chairman of the NATO Military Committee 1971–1974. Steinhoff received numerous honors for his work on the structure of the post war German Air Force and the integration of the German Federal Armed Forces into NATO, including: Great Cross of Merit of Merit of the Federal Republic with Star and Sash (Großes Verdienstkreuz mit Stern und Schulterband), the American Legion of Merit and the French Légion d'honneur.

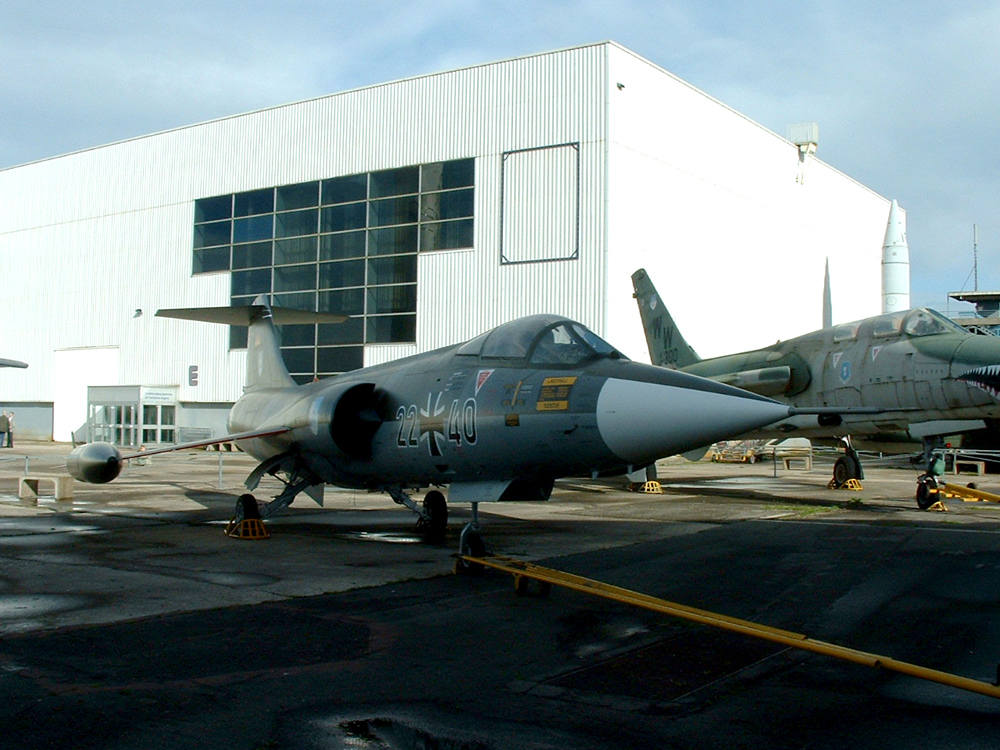
A former Luftwaffe Lockheed F-104 Starfighter at Le Bourget.

One of Steinhoff's contributions was dealing with the high accident rate the air force was having with its F-104 Starfighters. Upon researching the issue, Steinhoff, who had always been a good teacher, deduced that the problem was not the aircraft but poor training for pilots on that particular aircraft. He addressed the problem with an intensive training regime and the accident rate dropped dramatically, from 44.3 total losses per 100,000 flight hours in 1965 to 9.3 total losses per 100,000 flight hours in 1967.

After retiring from his NATO command in 1974, Steinhoff became a widely read author of books on German military aviation during the war and the experiences of the German people at that time. He wrote The Final Hours, which detailed a late-war plot against Hermann Göring, and also published a vivid account of his time in Italy: Messerschmitts over Sicily: Diary of a Luftwaffe Fighter Commander. Steinhoff also became a water-colourist, and chairman of Germany's Dornier Flugzeugwerke.

Steinhoff, who had joined Dornier's supervisory board on 28 June 1974, was not without controversy because Dornier was a major contractor for the German Air Force. Defense Minister Georg Leber announced that Steinhoff was not a member of the Bundeswehr, but of NATO. Consequently, his transition did not fall under the regulations that prohibited such a postings for Bundeswehr soldiers. On 16 December 1977, Steinhoff became chairman of the supervisory board of Dornier and held this position until 1 July 1983.

=== Bitburg cemetery controversy ===
In May 1985, Steinhoff met Ronald Reagan, then President of the United States, during a visit to the WWII Kolmeshöhe Military Cemetery near Bitburg. The event was planned to be an act of reconciliation on the 40th anniversary of V-E Day. Reagan and West German Chancellor Helmut Kohl were to pay their respects at the German military cemetery. However, the US President faced national and political pressure to cancel the visit from American Jewish groups and World War II American veterans after it was discovered that 22 Waffen-SS men were buried among the 2,000 military graves. The presence of Nazi soldiers led to the controversy because the entire SS had been adjudged to be a criminal organisation at the Nuremberg trials. Although not part of the original itinerary, as part of their own reconciliatory gesture, Reagan and Kohl made an impromptu visit to the Bergen-Belsen concentration camp before visiting Bitburg, thus reducing the time Reagan had to spend at Kolmeshöhe Military Cemetery to only eight minutes. He was joined by Steinhoff, Kohl and 90-year-old US Army General Matthew Ridgway who had commanded the 82nd Airborne in World War II. On May 3, Ridgway had called White House Deputy Chief of Staff Mike Deaver and offered to lay the wreath himself to save Reagan's precarious situation. The White House instead arranged for Ridgway and Steinhoff to solemnly shake hands. After Reagan placed a wreath at the cemetery memorial, they all stood to attention while a short trumpet salute was played. At the end, Steinhoff suddenly turned and shook hands with Ridgway. A surprised Kohl later thanked Steinhoff for his actions, who later said that it just seemed to be the right thing to do.

=== Death ===
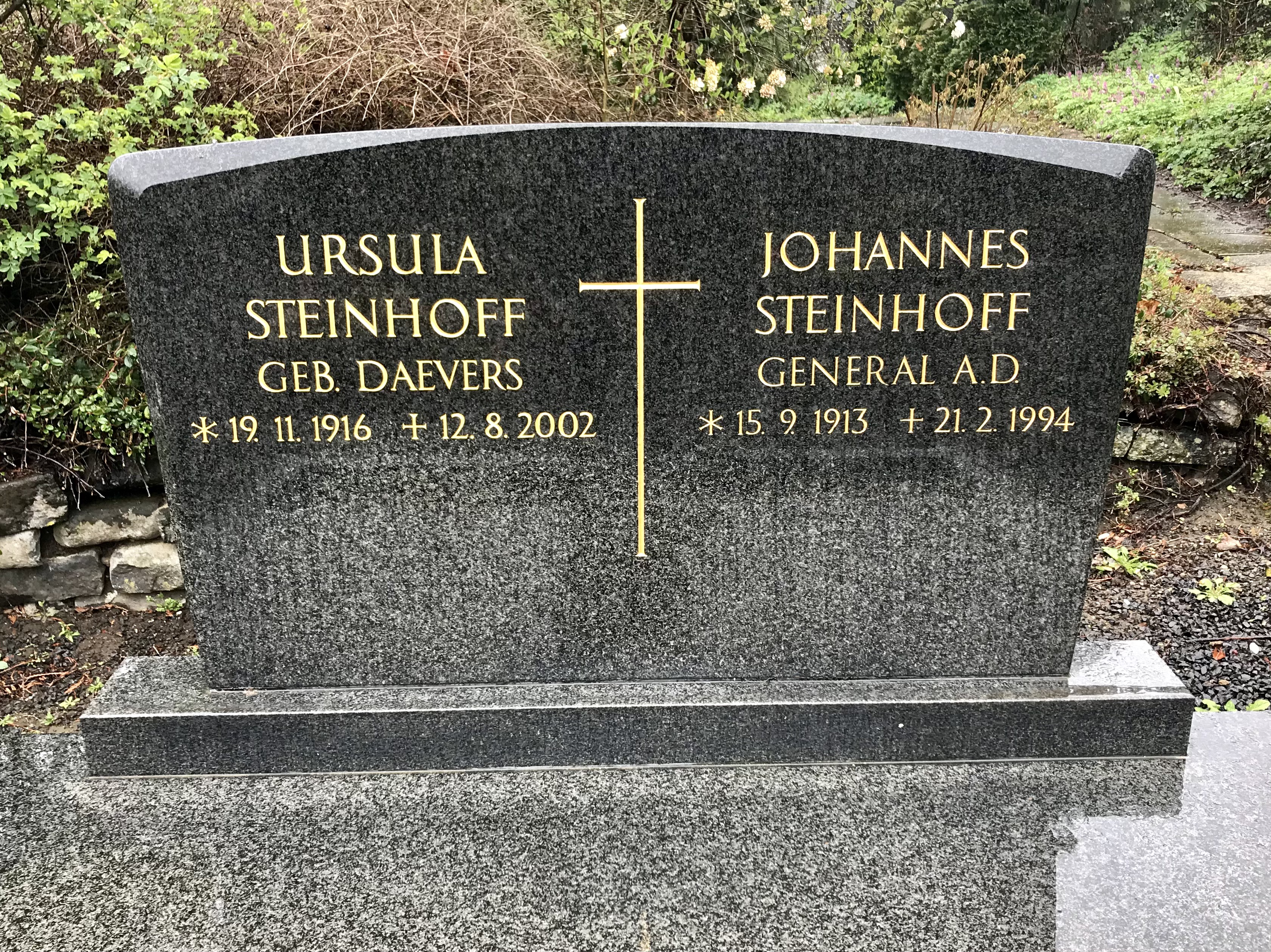
Graves of Ursula and Johannes Steinhoff in Villip, Wachtberg.

On 21 February 1994, Steinhoff died in Wachtberg-Pech from complications arising from a heart attack he suffered the previous December. He was 80, and had lived in nearby Bad Godesberg.

== Summary of career ==
=== Aerial victory claims ===
According to US historian David T. Zabecki, Steinhoff was credited with 176 aerial victories. Spick also lists him with 176 aerial victories claimed in 993 combat missions. This number includes 148 claims on the Eastern Front and 28 claims over the Western Allies, including six flying the Me 262 jet fighter. Mathews and Foreman, authors of Luftwaffe Aces — Biographies and Victory Claims, researched the German Federal Archives and found records for 168 aerial victory claims, plus nine further unconfirmed claims. This figure of confirmed claims includes 149 aerial victories on the Eastern Front and 19 on the Western Front, including three four-engine bombers and six victories with the Me 262 jet fighter.

Victory claims were logged to a map-reference (PQ = Planquadrat), for example "PQ 95371". The Luftwaffe grid map (Jägermeldenetz) covered all of Europe, western Russia and North Africa and was composed of rectangles measuring 15 minutes of latitude by 30 minutes of longitude, an area of about 360 square miles (930 km^{2}). These sectors were then subdivided into 36 smaller units to give a location area 3 km × 4 km (1.9 mi × 2.5 mi) in size.

Chronicle of aerial victories
This and the ♠ (Ace of spades) indicates those aerial victories which made Steinhoff an "ace-in-a-day", a term which designates a fighter pilot who has shot down five or more airplanes in a single day. This and the – (dash) indicates unwitnessed aerial victory claims for which Steinhoff did not receive credit. This along with the * (asterisk) indicates an Herausschuss (separation shot)—a severely damaged heavy bomber forced to separate from his combat box which was counted as an aerial victory. This and the ? (question mark) indicates information discrepancies listed by Barbas, Prien, Stemmer, Rodeike, Bock, Mathews and Foreman.
Claim	Date	Time	Type	Location	Claim	Date	Time	Type	Location
– 10(Nacht). Staffel of Jagdgeschwader 26 "Schlageter" – "Phoney War" — 1 September 1939 – 9 May 1940
1	18 December 1939	14:30	Wellington	30 km (19 mi) southwest of Heligoland	2	18 December 1939	14:35	Wellington	30 km (19 mi) southwest of Heligoland
– 11(Nacht). Staffel of Jagdgeschwader 2 "Richthofen" – Battle of France — 10 May – 25 June 1940
3	10 May 1940	—	Blenheim	The Hague	4	10 May 1940	—	Blenheim	Düsseldorf
– 4. Staffel of Jagdgeschwader 52 – Action at the Channel and over England — 26 June 1940 – 9 June 1941
5	30 September 1940	13:45	Spitfire	Dorking	7	19 May 1941	12:40	Spitfire	north of Dover; Canterbury
6	14 February 1941	13:00	Spitfire	30 km (19 mi) north of Dungeness	8	19 May 1941	12:45	Spitfire	north of Dover
– 4. Staffel of Jagdgeschwader 52 – Operation Barbarossa — 22 June – 5 December 1941
9	22 June 1941	10:00? (Note: According to Barbas claimed at 09:53 over a Polikarpov I-153.)	I-15?	Varėna	31	26 August 1941	08:55	I-17 (MiG-1)	Malaya Bronnitsa
10	26 June 1941	09:32	DB-3	south of Varėna	32	26 August 1941	08:58	I-17 (MiG-1)	15 km (9.3 mi) southeast of Lyuban
11	1 July 1941	18:26	I-16	north of Barysaw	33	27 August 1941	15:38	R-5	6 km (3.7 mi) northeast of Ljesja
12	2 July 1941	17:22	DB-3	Barysaw	34	27 August 1941	15:39	R-5	3 km (1.9 mi) northeast of Ljesja
13? (Note: According to Mathews and Foreman this claim is unconfirmed.)	2 July 1941	—	DB-3	south of Barysaw	35	29 August 1941	15:10	I-15	southeast of Kolpino
14	2 July 1941	17:34	DB-3	south of Smalyavichy	36	1 September 1941	15:15	DB-3	30 km (19 mi) northeast of Lyuban
15	3 July 1941	18:19	DB-3	northeast of Barysaw	37	6 September 1941	11:55	I-18 (MiG-1)	1 km (0.62 mi) northwest of Mga railroad
16	3 July 1941	18:30	DB-3	northeast of Barysaw	38	6 September 1941	16:47	I-18 (MiG-1)	Makovo railway station
17	4 July 1941	12:02	DB-3	west of Vitebsk	39	26 September 1941	07:55	I-18 (MiG-1)	10 km (6.2 mi) west of Wolchowstroj
18	5 July 1941	06:28	DB-3	north of Ulla	40	3 October 1941	14:17	I-153	10 km (6.2 mi) northeast of Chełm
19	6 July 1941	12:40	DB-3	north of Dzisna	41	5 October 1941	07:10	I-18 (MiG-1)	30 km (19 mi) northwest of Vyazma
20	7 July 1941	12:15	DB-3	west of Polotsk	42	6 October 1941	06:25? (Note: According to Mathews and Foreman claimed at 06:15.)	I-16	10 km (6.2 mi) southeast of Chełm
21?	9 July 1941	—	Pe-2	northwest of Besvhenkowitschi	43	18 October 1941	15:17	Pe-2	north of Kalinin
22	22 July 1941	11:05	I-16	south of Wyssokaja	44	18 October 1941	15:18	Pe-2	Kalinin
23	26 July 1941	05:12	V-11 (Il-2)	northeast of Yartsevo	45	24 October 1941	15:55	Pe-2	southwest of Kalinin
24	27 July 1941	18:05	I-18 (MiG-1)	north of Vyazma	46	14 November 1941	15:55? (Note: According to Mathews and Foreman claimed at 14:55.)	I-18 (MiG-1)	5 km (3.1 mi) south of Vyazma
25	28 July 1941	17:35	I-18 (MiG-1)	6 km (3.7 mi) east of Gorky	47	26 November 1941	13:20? (Note: According to Mathews and Foreman claimed at 13:30.)	I-26 (Yak-1)	10 km (6.2 mi) south of Stolnetschnogorst
26	29 July 1941	17:28	DB-3	northwest of Lake Tschutsche	48	28 November 1941	09:20	Il-2	10 km (6.2 mi) east of Istra
27	29 July 1941	17:34	DB-3	southwest of Tschernaja	49	28 November 1941	14:50	BB-22 (Seversky)	10 km (6.2 mi) southwest of Stolnetschnogorst
28	10 August 1941	13:35? (Note: According to Mathews and Foreman claimed at 19:55.)	I-16	8 km (5.0 mi) north of Shimsk	50	2 December 1941	08:25	BB-22 (Seversky)	Belji-Rast
29	25 August 1941	12:10	I-16	10 km (6.2 mi) northwest of Tosno	51	2 December 1941	14:30	BB-22 (Seversky)	10 km (6.2 mi) west of Moscow
30	26 August 1941	08:50	I-17 (MiG-1)	10 km (6.2 mi) southwest of Lyuban					
– II. Gruppe of Jagdgeschwader 52 – Eastern Front — 7 May 1942 – 3 February 1943
52	9 May 1942	04:00	I-153	5 km (3.1 mi) west of Akmonaj	102	8 September 1942	14:40	LaGG-3	5 km (3.1 mi) northeast of Malgobek
53	9 May 1942	12:43	I-153	2 km (1.2 mi) west of Sedshent	103	8 September 1942	14:42	LaGG-3	5 km (3.1 mi) northeast of Malgobek
54	15 May 1942	04:17	MiG-1	Staryi Saltiv	104	10 September 1942	14:25	LaGG-3	10 km (6.2 mi) southeast of Malgobek
55	17 May 1942	09:34	MiG-1	Borogoditschnoje	105	16 September 1942	16:20	LaGG-3	5 km (3.1 mi) north of Kalinowskaja
56	19 May 1942	08:35	MiG-1	3 km (1.9 mi) west of Jaskow	106	17 September 1942	14:40	Su-2	5 km (3.1 mi) northwest of Meckenskaja
57	19 May 1942	14:55	Il-2	20 km (12 mi) south of Izium	107	17 September 1942	16:40	LaGG-3	2 km (1.2 mi) west of Kalaus River
58	23 May 1942	05:45	MiG-1	2 km (1.2 mi) south of Petrowerka	108	20 September 1942	09:40	I-16	PQ 95371, Gelendzhik
59	23 May 1942	14:26	V-11 (Il-2)	6 km (3.7 mi) northwest of Odjanyi	109	26 September 1942	15:39	Yak-1	10 km (6.2 mi) northeast of Gelendzhik
60	26 May 1942	11:30	Il-2	4 km (2.5 mi) north of Petroskaja	110	26 September 1942	15:40	Yak-1	10 km (6.2 mi) northeast of Gelendzhik
61	26 May 1942	17:24	Il-2	1 km (0.62 mi) east of Iwanowka	111	11 November 1942	08:10	Yak-1	PQ 94161, Lazarevskoye
62	2 June 1942	12:38	I-16	5 km (3.1 mi) east of Grakowo	112	11 November 1942	14:18	LaGG-3	10 km (6.2 mi) north of Lazarevskoye
63	4 June 1942	18:45	Il-2	4 km (2.5 mi) east of Grakowo	113	28 November 1942	07:50	P-40	5 km (3.1 mi) south of Pitomnik airfield
64	14 June 1942	16:10	LaGG-3	5 km (3.1 mi) west of Kosorsha	114	28 November 1942	10:40	Yak-1	PQ 49184, Pitomnik Airfield
65	22 June 1942	17:55	Hurricane	5 km (3.1 mi) northwest of Kupiansk	115	30 November 1942	07:45	Yak-1	25 km (16 mi) northwest of Morozovsk (Morosowskaja)
66	23 June 1942	19:21	Su-2	5 km (3.1 mi) north of Kupiansk	116	30 November 1942	07:47? (Note: According to Mathews and Foreman claimed at 07:46.)	Yak-1	25 km (16 mi) north of Morosowskaja
67	1 July 1942	10:05	Il-2	Krasowka	117	30 November 1942	10:15	Yak-1	PQ 39424, Marinowka
68	1 July 1942	10:10	Boston	Krasowka	118	30 November 1942	10:30	P-40	PQ 40754, Schirkokow
69	3 July 1942	13:15	Hurricane	8 km (5.0 mi) east of Novy Oskol	119	1 December 1942	08:20	Yak-1	5 km (3.1 mi) south of Spartek
70	4 July 1942	10:32	LaGG-3	1 km (0.62 mi) southwest of Ostroghosk	120	2 December 1942	12:15	Yak-1	5 km (3.1 mi) south of Bassargewo
71	10 July 1942	10:30	LaGG-3		121	7 December 1942	13:23	P-40	10 km (6.2 mi) southeast of Bratkij
72	17 July 1942	07:55	I-16		122	8 December 1942	09:10	Boston	PQ 29253, Sslepichin
73	19 July 1942	13:50	I-153	5 km (3.1 mi) southwest of Koisug	123	8 December 1942	12:30	Boston	10 km (6.2 mi) west of Karachev
74	20 July 1942	16:15	LaGG-3	5 km (3.1 mi) southeast of Batajsk	124	8 December 1942	12:40	MiG-1	3 km (1.9 mi) east of Nishnj Kubanskij
75	23 July 1942	18:10	I-16	2 km (1.2 mi) south of Kastora	125	8 December 1942	12:50	MiG-1	3 km (1.9 mi) east of Nishnj Kubanskij
76	24 July 1942	16:23	Il-2	4 km (2.5 mi) south of Wislyi	126	10 December 1942	11:40	LaGG-3	8 km (5.0 mi) west of Pitomnik airfield
77	25 July 1942	17:40	I-153	5 km (3.1 mi) west of Martinowskaja	127	11 December 1942	09:23	Yak-1	PQ 29633, southwest of Grosnaja
78	21 August 1942	16:00	I-180 (Yak-7)	PQ 49411, Stalingrad; 5 km (3.1 mi) east of Stalingrad	128	11 December 1942	09:26	Yak-1	PQ 2949, Ostrowskoj
79	22 August 1942	10:20	LaGG-3	1 km (0.62 mi) south of Serepta	129	12 December 1942	12:22	Pe-2	PQ 38342, west of Kotelnikowo
80	22 August 1942	10:55	Hurricane	PQ 49411, Stalingrad	130	13 December 1942	12:15	Pe-2	PQ 38282, Ssamchin
81♠	23 August 1942	05:40	LaGG-3	4 km (2.5 mi) south of Semenk	131	13 December 1942	12:16	Yak-1	5 km (3.1 mi) south of Aksay
82♠	23 August 1942	05:50	LaGG-3	2 km (1.2 mi) north of Jaryew	132	17 December 1942	07:10	P-40	5 km (3.1 mi) north of Shutow 2
83♠	23 August 1942	12:20	I-153	10 km (6.2 mi) west of Gorodischtsche	133	17 December 1942	13:15	Yak-1	10 km (6.2 mi) northeast of Shutow 2
84♠	23 August 1942	15:10	I-180 (Yak-7)	PQ 49413, Krasnaya Sloboda	134	18 December 1942	10:33	Yak-1	6 km (3.7 mi) east of Gromoslawka
85♠	23 August 1942	17:25	LaGG-3	PQ 49411, Stalingrad	135	20 December 1942	10:53	Yak-1	5 km (3.1 mi) southwest of Vasilyevka
86	24 August 1942	06:20	I-180 (Yak-7)	PQ 59323, Leninsk	136	25 December 1942	13:00	Yak-1	PQ 38241, south of Shutowo
87	25 August 1942	11:05	LaGG-3	1 km (0.62 mi) north of Stalingrad	137	25 December 1942	13:30	Pe-2	PQ 38334, north of Tschernj
88	25 August 1942	11:07	LaGG-3	10 km (6.2 mi) northwest of Akhtuba	138	28 December 1942	10:37? (Note: According to Mathews and Foreman claimed at 10:27.)	La-5	5 km (3.1 mi) north of Kotelnikowo
89	25 August 1942	14:45	I-180 (Yak-7)	2 km (1.2 mi) north of Saplaunoje	139	28 December 1942	12:55	La-5	10 km (6.2 mi) east of Kotelnikowo
90	25 August 1942	17:37	I-180 (Yak-7)	5 km (3.1 mi) east of Stalingrad	140	9 January 1943	12:43	Yak-1	PQ 28782, 2 km (1.2 mi) north of Kuberke railway station
91	27 August 1942	05:35	I-180 (Yak-7)	PQ 49431, Srednyaya Akhtuba	141	9 January 1943	12:50	Yak-1	PQ 28872, 2 km (1.2 mi) east of Matschenkow
92	27 August 1942	11:34	I-180 (Yak-7)	1 km (0.62 mi) east of Krasnaya Sloboda	142	14 January 1943	14:32	Il-2	PQ 17263, east of Igand
93	28 August 1942	14:50	LaGG-3	PQ 49223, Werchne	143	14 January 1943	14:33	La-5	PQ 17263, east of Igand
94	28 August 1942	14:57	LaGG-3	10 km (6.2 mi) east of Rachinka	144	14 January 1943	14:33	La-5	PQ 27242, east of Igand
95♠	30 August 1942	13:10	LaGG-3	5 km (3.1 mi) north of Konnoja railway station	145	25 January 1943	11:50	La-5	PQ 9865, east of Rostov
96♠	30 August 1942	13:12	LaGG-3	30 km (19 mi) west of Dubovka	146	26 January 1943	10:15	Boston	PQ 08521, Nowo Tscherkassk
97♠	30 August 1942	17:00	LaGG-3	PQ 49362, Beketowka	147	31 January 1943	13:00	Boston	PQ 09871, east of Rostov
98♠	30 August 1942	17:10	LaGG-3	5 km (3.1 mi) south of Andrejewka	148	1 February 1943	14:25	Yak-1	PQ 9962, east of Rostov
99♠	30 August 1942	17:12	LaGG-3	5 km (3.1 mi) south of Andrejewka	149	2 February 1943	09:25	Yak-1	PQ 9962, east of Rostov
100	31 August 1942	05:20	LaGG-3	1 km (0.62 mi) south of Kurpjok	150	2 February 1943	09:28	Yak-1	PQ 99622, east of Rostov
101	31 August 1942	17:05	LaGG-3	10 km (6.2 mi) north of Krasnoarmejsk					
– II. Gruppe of Jagdgeschwader 52 – Eastern Front — February 1943
151	12 February 1943	12:02	Yak-1	PQ 34 Ost 8659, Flamanskaja	154	23 February 1943	12:47	Yak-1	PQ 34 Ost 8656, 10 km (6.2 mi) north of Staromyschastowskaja
152	23 February 1943	09:02	Il-2	PQ 34 Ost 76664, west of Flamjanskaja	155	25 February 1943	08:40	Yak-1	PQ 34 Ost 7523, Krymskaja; Krymsk
153	23 February 1943	12:45	Yak-1	PQ 34 Ost 8656					
– Stab of Jagdgeschwader 77 – North Africa — April 1943
156	4 April 1943	—	Spitfire	southwest of La Fauconnerie					
– Stab of Jagdgeschwader 77 – Italy — June – 31 December 1943
157	25 June 1943	13:25	B-17	PQ 03 Ost 19154, west of Trapani	161	25 August 1943	09:59	P-38	8 km (5.0 mi) south of San Severo
158	7 July 1943	17:25	Martlet	20 km (12 mi) southwest of Marsala	162?	25 August 1943	10:00	P-38	10 km (6.2 mi) south-southwest of San Severo
159? (Note: This claim is not listed by Mathews and Foreman.)	8 July 1943	—	P-40	Trapani	163	25 August 1943	10:01	P-38	15 km (9.3 mi) south-southwest of San Severo
160	25 August 1943	09:58	P-38	5 km (3.1 mi) south of San Severo	164	1 December 1943	10:59	Mosquito	southwest of Piacenza
– Stab of Jagdgeschwader 77 – Italy — June – 31 December 1943
165?	25 February 1944	—	B-17*	southwest of Klagenfurt	167	9 June 1944	11:45	B-24	PQ 14 Ost S/TH-1, south of Pula
166	10 May 1944	12:50	P-38	60 km (37 mi) southeast of Zagreb	—	14 July 1944	—	B-25	
– Stab of Jagdgeschwader 77 – Eastern Front — September 1944
—	22 September 1944	—	Yak-9		—	24 September 1944	—	Yak-9	
—	24 September 1944	—	Il-2		—	25 September 1944	—	Bf 109	vicinity of Klausenberg
– Stab of Jagdgeschwader 7 "Nowotny" – Eastern Front — February – March 1945
169	27 February 1945	—	Yak-9		171	20 March 1945	—	Il-2	
170	27 February 1945	—	Yak-9						
– Jagdverband 44 – Defense of the Reich — April 1945
172	3 April 1945	—	B-17		174	9 April 1945	—	P-51	
173	5 April 1945	—	P-51	Riem					

=== Awards and honours ===
- Iron Cross (1939) 2nd and 1st Class
- Honor Goblet of the Luftwaffe (Ehrenpokal der Luftwaffe) (18 August 1941)
- Knight's Cross of the Iron Cross with Oak Leaves and Swords
  - Knight's Cross on 30 August 1941 as Oberleutnant and Staffelkapitän of the 4./Jagdgeschwader 52
  - 115th Oak Leaves on 2 September 1942 as Hauptmann and Gruppenkommandeur of the II./Jagdgeschwader 52
  - 82nd Swords on 28 July 1944 as Oberstleutnant and Geschwaderkommodore of Jagdgeschwader 77
- Great Cross of Merit of Merit of the Federal Republic with Star and Sash (4 July 1972)
- Legion of Merit (1970)
- Légion d'honneur (March 1972)

On 6 October 1994, the former RAF Gatow barracks in Berlin Gatow, were named General Steinhoff Kaserne on being taken over by the German Federal Armed Forces. On 18 September 1997, Jagdgeschwader 73 (fighter wing 73) of the German Air Force was named "Steinhoff" in honor of the general. Steinhoff is one of only a handful of pilots honored in this way, along with Manfred von Richthofen and Max Immelmann.

== Publications ==
Steinhoff wrote the following books:

- Die Straße von Messina. Tagebuch des Kommodore (in German). Kulbach & Munich: List. 1969. ISBN 978-3-47178-822-6. English translation: Messerschmitts Over Sicily: Diary of a Luftwaffe Fighter Commander 2004. ISBN 978-0-81174-150-7.
- In letzter Stunde. Verschwörung der Jagdflieger. Vom Widerstand der Jagdflieger gegen Reichsmarschall Göring [In the last hour. Conspiracy of the fighter pilots. On the resistance of the fighter pilots against Reichsmarschall Göring] (in German). Flechsig. 1974. ISBN 978-3-88189-592-7.
- Wohin treibt die NATO? Probleme der Verteidigung Westeuropas [Where is NATO going? Defence Problems of Western Europe] (in German). Hamburg: Hoffmann und Campe. 1976. ISBN 978-3-455-08986-8.
- The Last Chance - The Pilots' Plot Against Goering 1944–1945. London: Hutchinson & Co. 1977. ISBN 978-0-09-129620-9.

== Notes ==
Military offices
Preceded by Major Joachim Müncheberg	Commander of Jagdgeschwader 77 Herz As; 1 April 1943 – 1 December 1944	Succeeded by Major Johannes Wiese
Preceded by none	Commander of Jagdgeschwader 7 Nowotny; 1 December 1944 – 26 December 1944	Succeeded by Major Theodor Weissenberger
Preceded by —	Commander of 4. Luftwaffendivision (Bundeswehr); 4 December 1963 – 14 April 1965	Succeeded by Generalmajor Herbert Wehnelt
Preceded by Air Chief Marshal Sir Edmund Hudleston	Commander Allied Air Forces Central Europe; Acting; 1965 – 1966	Formation disbanded
Preceded by Generalleutnant Werner Panitzki	Inspector of the Air Force; 2 September 1966 – 31 December 1970	Succeeded by Generalleutnant Günther Rall
Preceded by Admiral Sir Nigel Henderson	Chairman of the NATO Military Committee; 1971 – 1974	Succeeded by Admiral of the Fleet Sir Peter Hill-Norton
