= Senator Bird =

Senator Bird may refer to:

- Claire B. Bird (1868–1954), Wisconsin State Senate
- D. Woodrow Bird (1912–1995), Virginia State Senate
- Daniel W. Bird Jr. (born 1938), Virginia State Senate
- Harlan P. Bird (1838–1912), Wisconsin State Senate
- Israel Bird (fl. 1870s–1880s), South Carolina State Senate
- Lester Bird (1938–2021), Senate of Antigua and Barbuda
- Lloyd C. Bird (1894–1978), Virginia State Senate
- Michael Bird (politician) (born c. 1930), Colorado State Senate

== See also ==
- Senator Byrd (disambiguation)
