= Compbach =

River in Germany

- North Rhine-Westphalia

Location
- Country: Germany
- State: North Rhine-Westphalia

Physical characteristics
- Mouth
  - location: Godesberger Bach
  - coordinates: 50.6553°N 7.1238°E

Basin features
- Progression: Godesberger Bach→ Rhine→ North Sea

Compbach is a small river of North Rhine-Westphalia, Germany. It flows into the Godesberger Bach in Pech.

== See also ==
- List of rivers of North Rhine-Westphalia
