= Hugo Juhl =

German Jewish businessman (1872–1939)

Hugo Juhl (27 November 1872 – 10 June 1939) was a German-born Jewish businessman who ran the 'Wäschefabrik Juhl & Helmke', a textile factory in Bielefeld from 1913 to 1938. In 1993, the factory building was converted into a museum which is located today at Viktoriastrasse 48a, Bielefeld.

== Early life ==
Juhl was born in Adendorf (now part of the municipality of Wachtberg near Meckenheim, Germany). In 1892, at the age of 20, Juhl started an apprenticeship in the linen industry of Moritz Dahl, which had been initiated by Juhl’s father Michael Juhl (1836-1906). Moritz Dahl died in 1899 and his widow, Bertha Dahl, sold the business to the former employees Hugo Juhl and Max Helmke in 1900.

== Business career ==
In 1911, Juhl bought the houses on Viktoriastrasse 48 and 50, including a property which was located next to the manufactory where he set up an integrated residential building for the entire family to live. The manufactory began its work in 1913 producing bed and table linen, underwear, women’s blouses and men’s shirts by making use of modern industrial production processes. Klara Juhl (née Selig), Hugo's wife, who was born into a prosperous Jewish family, played a crucial role in supporting her husband financially in the creation of his textile business. In the beginning of the 1920s, the 'Wäschefabrik' experienced economic prosperity and benefited from a continuing export boom due to the expanding demand for textiles and linen encouraged by the currency decline at that time. This was the reason Hugo Juhl set up further production halls in Viktoriastrasse 65 and Heeper Straße 48 in order to increase the workforce. However, these 'golden years' were not of lasting nature. The stabilisation of the Reichsmark in 1924 led to a crisis of lower demand for textile goods in 1925. Given these conditions, Juhl was forced to take action and introduced some restructuring measures within the factory which yielded a positive economic gain.

== After Nazi takeover ==
After the NSDAP came to power, the manufactory was not immediately affected by the boycott on Jewish businesses because of the 'Aryanisation'. However, Jewish business people were systematically displaced from the German industry branch. Given the political change within the country, Juhl's youngest daughter Hannah and her husband Dr. Fritz Bender had already emigrated to the Netherlands in the beginning of the 1930s. From 1938 onwards, the manufactory and other buildings in Bielefeld were sold to the brothers Theodor and Georg Winkel; in between the health condition of Juhl became worse and he died in June 1939 from kidney failure. After his death, both his wife Klara and their elder daughter Mathilde flew to Amsterdam to join Hannah and her husband in order to escape the Nazi Regime. However on 10 May 1940 Nazi Germany invaded the Netherlands. On 3 July 1940, Klara, Hannah, Mathilde and the daughter of Hannah and Fritz Bender chose to commit suicide. Fritz Bender was the only one who survived his family by fleeing on a rowing boat in the North Sea to England. From there he flew to Canada where he stayed till his death. While he was in an internment camp in Canada, he learned from the Red Cross that his family had died.

== Remembrance ==
Today, Stolpersteine inscribed with the names and the life dates of the family members have been placed in front of the building on Viktoriastraße Bielefeld where the Juhls had lived.
