= Heinrich Bartels =

German fighter pilot during World War II (1918–1944)

- Bartels as an Oberfeldwebel
- Born: 13 July 1918; Linz, Austria-Hungary
- Died: 23 December 1944 (aged 26); Bad Godesberg, Nazi Germany
- Cause of death: Killed in action
- Burial place: Cemetery in Villip, Wachtberg
- Military career
- Allegiance: Nazi Germany
- Branch: Luftwaffe
- Service years: 1939–1944
- Rank: Oberfeldwebel (staff sergeant)
- Units: Erg./JG 26, JG 1, JG 5, JG 27
- Conflicts: World War II
- Awards: Knight's Cross of the Iron Cross
- Other work: Butcher

Heinrich Bartels (13 July 1918 – 23 December 1944) was an Austrian-born German fighter pilot in the Luftwaffe and fought during World War II. Bartels was credited with 99 victories, making him a fighter ace. A fighter ace is a military aviator credited with shooting down five or more enemy aircraft during aerial combat.

Born in Austria in 1918 and working as a baker to his late teenage years Bartels joined the Luftwaffe after Germany's union with Austria in 1938. Bartels completed his training as a pilot in 1941. He was assigned to Jagdgeschwader 26 "Schlageter" (JG 26—26th Fighter Wing) on the Channel Front which was tasked with intercepting Royal Air Force (RAF) incursions over occupied France and Belgium. He achieved his first aerial victory in August 1941. Bartels was transferred to Jagdgeschwader 5 (JG 5—5th Fighter Wing) on the Eastern Front where he was awarded the Knight's Cross of the Iron Cross for 46 aerial victories. In 1943 Bartels moved to Jagdgeschwader 27 "Afrika" (JG 27—27th Fighter Wing) to serve in the Mediterranean and Balkans theatres and by the years end had 73 victories. In 1944 he returned to the Western Front and fought Normandy Campaign in June to August 1944. Bartel's personal tally rose to 96 and he was nominated for the Oak Leaves of the Knight's Cross.

On 23 December 1944, while supporting German forces in the Battle of the Bulge Bartels was shot down by United States Army Air Force (USAAF) P-47 Thunderbolts belonging to the US 56th Fighter Group after achieving his 99th aerial victory and he was posted missing in action. On 26 January 1968, 23 years later, Bartel's fighter and remains were found near Bad Godesberg, Germany.

== Career ==
Bartels was born on 13 July 1918 in Linz, Austria. Prior to his military service, Bartels was working as a butcher. (Note: According to Dixon, Bartels worked as a baker.) During his combat career, he frequently had his wife's name Marga painted on his aircraft. World War II in Europe had begun on Friday 1 September 1939 when German forces invaded Poland. Following completion of flight and fighter pilot training, (Note: Flight training in the Luftwaffe progressed through the levels A1, A2 and B1, B2, referred to as A/B flight training. A training included theoretical and practical training in aerobatics, navigation, long-distance flights and dead-stick landings. The B courses included high-altitude flights, instrument flights, night landings and training to handle the aircraft in difficult situations.) Bartels joined the Ergänzungsgruppe of Jagdgeschwader 26 "Schlageter" (JG 26—26th Fighter Wing) in the summer of 1941. The Ergänzungsgruppe of JG 26, a supplementary training group, was formed on 22 June 1941 in Wevelgem under the command of Hauptmann Fritz Fromme. The Gruppe was made up of two Staffeln (squadrons): The first squadron was the operational squadron and designated 1. (Einsatzstaffel) or 1. Erg./JG 26, while the second squadron was the training squadron referred to as 2. (Schulstaffel) or 2. Erg./JG 26. Serving with the 1. Erg./JG 26, Bartels claimed his first aerial victory on 19 August, a Royal Air Force (RAF) Supermarine Spitfire shot down at the English Channel. On 27 August, he was credited with another Spitfire shot down. On 1 February 1942, 1. Erg./JG 26 was renamed and became the 11. Staffel of Jagdgeschwader 1 (JG 1—1st Fighter Wing) under the command of Oberleutnant Hermann Segatz. The unit then participated in Operation Donnerkeil. The objective of this operation was to give the German battleships Scharnhorst and Gneisenau and the heavy cruiser Prinz Eugen fighter protection in the breakout from Brest to Germany. The Channel Dash operation (11–13 February 1942) by the Kriegsmarine was codenamed Operation Cerberus by the Germans. In support of this, the Luftwaffe, formulated an air superiority plan dubbed Operation Donnerkeil for the protection of the three German capital ships. Following the German ships, 11. Staffel arrived in Jever Air Field on 14 February and in Trondheim-Lade on 6 March. There, on 21 March, the squadron was re-designated 8. Staffel of Jagdgeschwader 5 (JG 5—5th Fighter Wing).

=== War on the Arctic Front ===
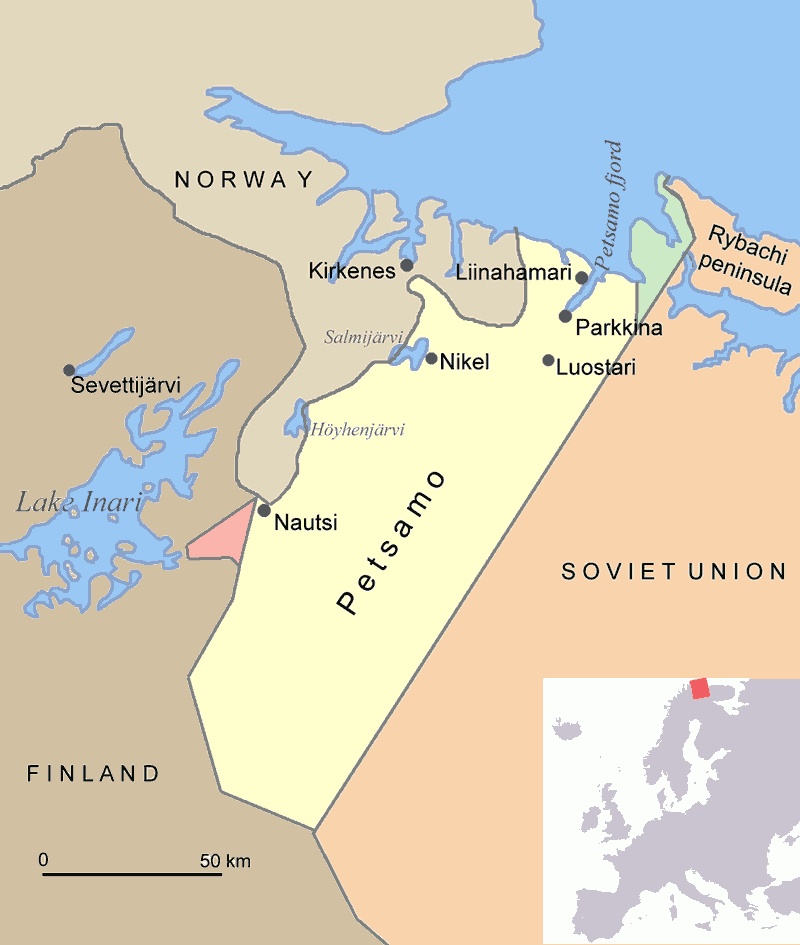
Area of operations.

On 20 April, 8. Staffel moved to an airfield at Petsamo, present-day Pechenga in Murmansk Oblast, Russia. On 26 April, the Staffel escorted Junkers Ju 87 dive bombers to Murmansk. The flight was intercepted by Hawker Hurricane fighters from 2 GvSAP (Gvardeyskiy Smeshannyy Aviatsionnyy Polk—Guards Composite Aviation Regiment). In this encounter, Bartels claimed one of the Hurricanes shot down, his first on the Arctic Front. JG 5 flew numerous fighter escort missions on 10 May resulting in aerial combat with the Soviet Air Forces (VVS). The VVS lost eight aircraft plus further two were severely damaged that day, including a Hurricane fighter shot down by Bartels. On 14 May between 17:55 and 19:03, eighteen German fighters flew on a Ju 87 escort mission to Murmansk. They encountered twenty-six Hurricanes, eleven Curtiss P-40 Warhawk and six Polikarpov I-16 fighters. Soviet reports indicate that one Hurricane and one P-40 was effectively lost with a I-16 and a further P-40 damaged. German pilots had claimed five aerial victories, including a I-16 by Bartels. The following day, in combat over the Liza Bight, Bartels shot down a Hurricane fighter. On 17 May, he increased his number of aerial victors to seven when he again claimed a Hurricane fighter shot down. On 29 July, on a Ju 87 dive bomber escort mission to Murmansk and Murmashi, Bartels claimed two Mikoyan-Gurevich MiG-3 fighters shot down north of Murmansk. According to Soviet records, no aircraft of that type were lost in that area that day. On 10 August, 8. Staffel had combat with 20 Hurricane fighters near Ura-Guba during the course of which Bartels claimed three Hurricanes shot down.

Bartels became an "ace-in-a-day" on 22 September. He claimed six aerial victories on two separate combat missions, including four Hurricanes and two MiG-3 fighters in the vicinity of Murmashi. Following his 40th aerial victory, he received the German Cross in Gold (Deutsches Kreuz in Gold) on 20 October. Bartels shot down three MiG-3 fighters during the third mission on 29 October, a fighter escort mission for Ju 87 dive bombers. On 5 November, 8. Staffel flew a combat air patrol to Murmansk. During the course of this mission, Bartels claimed the destruction of a Lavochkin-Gorbunov-Gudkov LaGG-3 fighter. He received the Knight's Cross of the Iron Cross (Ritterkreuz des Eisernen Kreuzes) after 46 aerial victories on 13 November 1942. That day, Leutnant Theodor Weissenberger from 6. Staffel of JG 5 was also awarded the Knight's Cross. The presentation was made by Generalmajor Alexander Holle on 30 November at Petsamo.

In early 1943, Bartels was transferred due to disciplinary reasons. According to Walter Schuck, the events leading to this disciplinary measure were made under the influence of large quantities of alcohol. Bartels, Schuck, and Kurt Dylewski had consumed three bottles of cognac. The intoxicated Bartels then attempted to drive a truck, was caught in the act by a fellow soldier who hit Bartels in the face. Bartels pursued the soldier only to get into a fight with another soldier. The events pinnacled when Bartels made a donkey empty its bladder into the company sergeant major's bed.

=== Greece and the Balkans ===
From August 1943, Bartels served with 11. Staffel of Jagdgeschwader 27 "Afrika" (JG 27—27th Fighter Wing). This Staffel was subordinated to the newly created IV. Gruppe of JG 27. The Gruppe had been formed in May 1943 at the Kalamaki Airfield in Athens, Greece under the command of Hauptmann Rudolf Sinner. 11. Staffel was commanded by Oberleutnant Alfred Buk. On 17 July, IV. Gruppe moved to Tanagra Airfield. Bartels claimed his first aerial victories with JG 27 on 1 October. Flying from Gadurrà Airfield on Rhodes, he claimed two Douglas A-20 Havoc bombers, also known as Bostons, near of Kos. In early October, the United States Army Air Forces (USAAF) flew many missions in support of British forces fighting in the Dodecanese campaign. On 5 October, IV. Gruppe intercepted a flight of Consolidated B-24 Liberator bombers over the northern Attica. In this encounter, Bartels claimed the destruction of two B-24 bombers. That day, Luftwaffe pilots claimed seven B-24 bombers shot down. USAAF records indicate the loss of four bombers, one by the 98th Bombardment Group and three by the 376th Bombardment Group. Three days later, 105 USAAF aircraft attacked German airfields in Greece. IV. Gruppe encountered the escort fighters and shot down three Lockheed P-38 Lightning fighters, all of them credited to Bartels. Other units of JG 27 were also engaged in aerial combat that day. In total, JG 27 pilots claimed eight P-38 fighters shot down while USAAF records indicate the loss of two P-38 fighters from the 95th Fighter Squadron.

On 18 October, IV. Gruppe command was passed on to Hauptmann Joachim Kirschner after the former commander Sinner had been transferred on 13 September. In the intermediate period, two officers had led the Gruppe, Oberleutnant Dietrich Boesler, who was killed on 10 October, and by Burk, the commander of 11. Staffel. Bartels claimed a Spitfire shot down on 23 October. Two days later, IV. Gruppe claimed seven aerial victories without loss. Between Stari Bar and Cape of Rodon the Gruppe engaged in combat with P-38 fighters of which Bartels shot down four of the USAAF fighters. On 31 October, 11. Staffel lost its Staffelkapitän (squadron leader) Burk who was shot down over sea near Cape of Rodon. In this encounter, Bartels shot down two P-38 fighters. Command of 11. Staffel was then briefly led by Leutnant Wolfgang Hohls until he was killed in action on 10 December. The Staffel was then led by Leutnant Rolf Heissner until 17 December when he was also killed. The next Staffelkapitän was then Leutnant Paul Becker. On 17. December, the Gruppenkommandeur (group commander) Kirschner was also shot down in combat and later killed. He was replaced by Hauptmann Otto Meyer.

Bartels claimed his 70th aerial victory on 15 November 1943. That day, he claimed to have shot down four P-38 fighters southeast of Kalamaki. That day, the USAAF 321st and 340th Bombardment Group, escorted by P-38 fighters of the 82nd Fighter Group, were intercepted by twelve Bf 109 fighters which were driven off without loss. At the time, he was assigned Messerschmitt Bf 109 G-6/R6 (Werknummer 27 169—factory number) "Red 13" bearing the name of his wife Marga. Two days later, he was credited with two North American B-25 Mitchell bombers and a P-38 fighter following an USAAF attack on the Kalamaki Airfield. These were his last claims in the Mediterranean theater. On 27 January 1944, IV. Gruppe began relocating to Graz Airfield, at first the ground personnel followed by the flying elements on 16 March. During its ten-month tenure since its creation in May 1943, IV. Gruppe pilots had claimed 88 aerial victories, including 24 by Bartels alone. During this period, the Gruppe lost 27 pilots plus further seven were severely wounded and one was taken prisoner of war.

=== Defense of the Reich ===
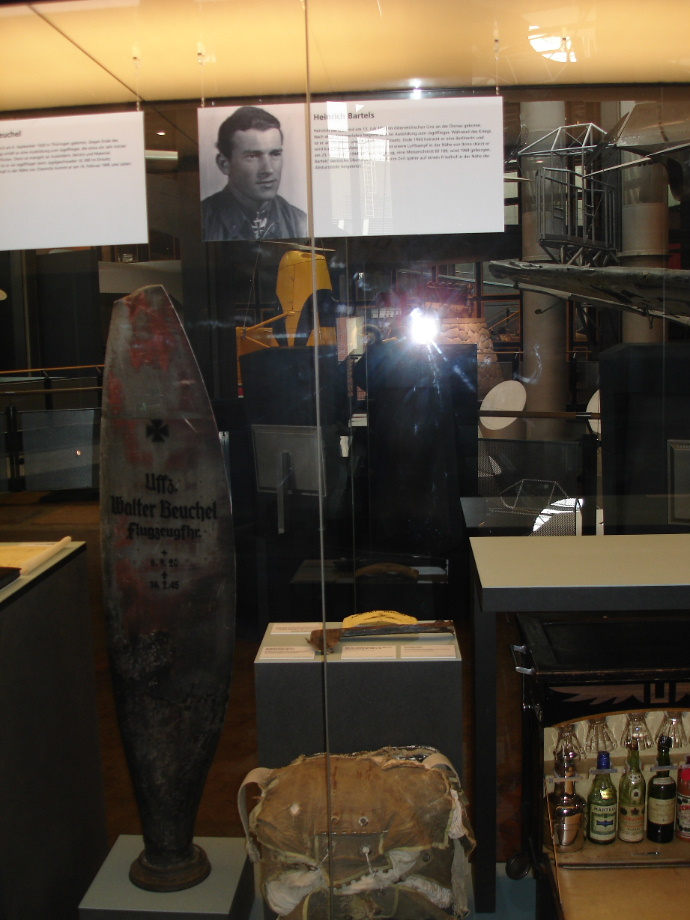
Bartels parachute on display at the Deutsches Technikmuseum Berlin

Based in Graz, IV. Gruppe, along with the Stab (headquarters unit), I. and III. Gruppe of JG 27, then fought in Defense of the Reich (Reichsverteidigung), defending southern Germany and Austria. IV. Gruppe became the Höhengruppe, the high-altitude group responsible for fighting off the escort fighters. Bartels claimed his first aerial victory in this theater on 11 April when he shot down a P-38 fighter 20 kilometers (12 miles) northwest of Graz. On 23 April, Bartels shot down three Spitfire fighters in combat near Celje, approximately halfway between Maribor and Ljubljana, in Slovenia. The following day, the USAAF Eighth Air Force targeted German airfields in southern Germany as well as the aircraft factories in Oberpfaffenhofen. The attack on Landsberg Airfield and Oberpfaffenhofen was headed by 281 bombers of the 1st Bombardment Division escorted by North American P-51 Mustang long-range fighter aircraft. IV. Gruppe intercepted this flight east of Munich. In this aerial battle, Bartels claimed three P-51 fighters shot down. On 28 April, Bartels shot down two P-51 fighters northeast of Ljubljana. The Eighth Air Force targeted Berlin on 19 May. Near Zerbst, IV. Gruppe encountered a formation of B-24 bombers escorted by escort fighters. The Gruppe was unable to break the escort screen and attack the bombers. In this battle, Bartels shot down three of the escort fighters.

On 6 June, Allied forces launched Operation Overlord, the invasion of German-occupied Western Europe in Normandy, France. IV. Gruppe was immediately ordered to relocate to Champfleury-la-Perthe, an airfield approximately 90 kilometers (56 miles) south of Reims. Bartels claimed his first aerial victories on the invasion front on 14 June. That day, IV. Gruppe encountered USAAF fighters in the vicinity of Argentan. In quick succession, he shot down three Republic P-47 Thunderbolt fighters, followed by a fourth P-47 on the return flight. Three days later, he claimed two further P-47 fighters shot down west of Dives-sur-Mer. On 22 June, Bartels shot down a Spitfire fighter and a P-51 fighter southwest of Caen. Two days later, he was credited with the destruction of two further P-51 fighters near Flers. He claimed his eleventh and last aerial victory on the invasion front on 25 June, a P-38 fighter shot down southeast of Blois. For these achievements, he was nominated for Knight's Cross of the Iron Cross with Oak Leaves (Ritterkreuz des Eisernen Kreuzes mit Eichenlaub). On 16 August, IV. Gruppe was withdrawn from the invasion front and ordered to Hustedt, north of Celle. During its eight weeks of combat on the invasion front, the Gruppe was nearly annihilated and lost 25 pilots either killed or missing in action with further 15 pilots severely wounded. In total, 98 aircraft were destroyed, 71 due to combat and 27 in flying accidents. Pilots of IV. Gruppe claimed 60 aerial victories, including eleven by Bartels, making him the most successful pilot of the unit.

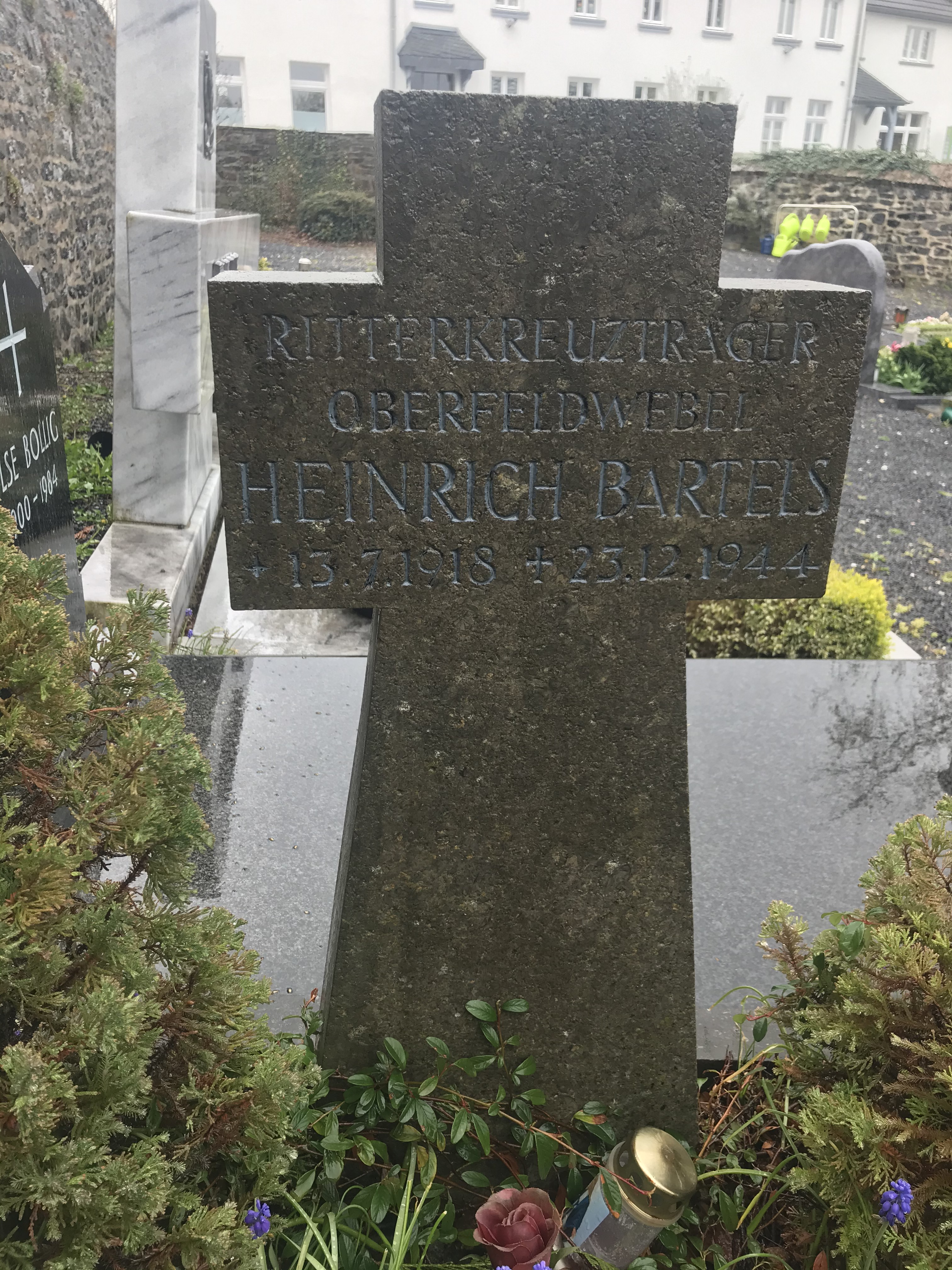
Grave in Villip, Wachtberg.

As part of the group expansion from three Staffeln per Gruppe to four Staffeln per Gruppe, Bartels' 11. Staffel was re-designated and became the 15. Staffel of JG 27. In mid-November, the Gruppe was reequipped with the Bf 109 G-10 fighter aircraft. Bartels claimed the destruction of a P-51 fighter on 8 December. Ten days later, he again shot down a P-51 in the combat area near Cologne. On 23 December 1944, Bartels took off for his last and fatal mission. After he shot down a P-47, he was most likely shot down himself by P-47 fighters of the USAAF 56th Fighter Group. His victor may have been Colonel David C. Schilling who claimed five aerial victories that day. Some 24 years later, on 26 January 1968, Bartels' Bf 109 G-10 (Werknummer 130 359) "Yellow 13" was found near Castle Gudenau in Villip, close to Bad Godesberg. In its cockpit was Bartels' remains and his intact parachute, which is currently on display at the Deutsches Technikmuseum Berlin. His last rank was Oberfeldwebel (technical sergeant).

== Summary of career ==
=== Aerial victory claims ===
According to US historian David T. Zabecki, Bartels was credited with 99 aerial victories. Obermaier also list him with 99 aerial victories claimed in approximately 500 combat missions. This figure includes 47 aerial victories on the Eastern Front and 52 over the Western Allies, including two four-engined bombers. Mathews and Foreman, authors of Luftwaffe Aces — Biographies and Victory Claims, researched the German Federal Archives and found records for 94 aerial victory claims, plus five further unconfirmed claims. This figure includes 47 aerial victories on the Eastern Front and another 47 on the Western Front, including two four-engined bombers.

Victory claims were logged to a map-reference (PQ = Planquadrat), for example "PQ 36 Ost 2920". The Luftwaffe grid map (Jägermeldenetz) covered all of Europe, western Russia and North Africa and was composed of rectangles measuring 15 minutes of latitude by 30 minutes of longitude, an area of about 360 square miles (930 km^{2}). These sectors were then subdivided into 36 smaller units to give a location area 3 km × 4 km (1.9 mi × 2.5 mi) in size.

Chronicle of aerial victories
This and the ♠ (Ace of spades) indicates those aerial victories which made Bartels an ace-in-a-day, a term which designates a fighter pilot who has shot down five or more airplanes in a single day. This and the – (dash) indicates unconfirmed aerial victory claims for which Bartels did not receive credit. This and the ? (exclamation mark) indicates information discrepancies listed by Prien, Stemmer, Rodeike, Bock, Mombeek, Mathews, and Foreman.
Claim	Date	Time	Type	Location	Claim	Date	Time	Type	Location
– 1. Ergänzungsjagdgruppe of Jagdgeschwader 26 "Schlageter" – Western Front — 22 June – 31 December 1941
1	19 August 1941	—	Spitfire		2	27 August 1941	—	Spitfire	
– 8. Staffel of Jagdgeschwader 5 – Eastern Front — April 1942 – March 1943
3	26 April 1942	09:31? (Note: According to Mathews and Foreman at 09:50.)	Hurricane	Murmansk vicinity of Ura-Guba	27	8 September 1942	15:08	P-40	vicinity of Murmashi
4	10 May 1942	17:12	Hurricane	Motovsky Gulf	28	8 September 1942	15:09	P-40	vicinity of Murmashi
5	14 May 1942	— ? (Note: According to Mathews and Foreman claimed at 18:35 over a Hawker Hurricane.)	I-16?		29	9 September 1942	10:35	P-39	vicinity of Kola railway
6	15 May 1942	18:11? (Note: According to Mathews and Foreman at 18:15.)	Hurricane	vicinity of Ura-Guba	30	11 September 1942	15:30	Yak-7	north of Murmashi
7	17 May 1942	05:42	Hurricane	vicinity of Ura-Guba	31	11 September 1942	15:35	MiG-3	
8	19 May 1942	09:30	MiG-3	south of Liza Bight	32	11 September 1942	15:37	MiG-3	
9	29 July 1942	10:15	MiG-3	north of Murmansk	33♠	22 September 1942	12:07	Hurricane	east of Murmashi
10	29 July 1942	10:16	MiG-3	north of Murmansk	34♠	22 September 1942	12:08	Hurricane	northeast of Murmashi
11	5 August 1942	12:40	P-40	south of Shonguy	35♠	22 September 1942	12:13	Hurricane	north-northeast of Murmashi
12	5 August 1942	12:45	P-40	south of Murmashi	36♠	22 September 1942	12:15	Hurricane	north-northeast of Murmashi
13	10 August 1942	18:50? (Note: According to Mathews and Foreman at 18:55.)	Hurricane		37♠	22 September 1942	15:12	MiG-3	2 km (1.2 mi) northeast of Murmashi
14	10 August 1942	18:55? (Note: According to Mathews and Foreman at 19:00.)	Hurricane		38♠	22 September 1942	15:21	MiG-3	7 km (4.3 mi) south of Murmashi
15	10 August 1942	19:05	Hurricane		39	29 September 1942	12:55	I-180 (Yak-7)	2 km (1.2 mi) east of Murmashi
16	11 August 1942	20:20	Hurricane		40	29 September 1942	12:56	I-180 (Yak-7)	2 km (1.2 mi) east of Murmashi
17	13 August 1942	15:00? (Note: According to Mathews and Foreman at 15:05.)	I-153		41	21 October 1942	13:25	MiG-3	north of Murmashi
18	13 August 1942	15:15	P-40		42	21 October 1942	13:28	MiG-3	
19	13 August 1942	15:20	P-40		43	29 October 1942	13:45	MiG-3? (Note: According to Mathews and Foreman claimed as a Lavochkin-Gorbunov-Gudkov LaGG-3.)	
20	2 September 1942	11:15	P-39	vicinity of Kola railway	44	29 October 1942	13:55	MiG-3?	
21	2 September 1942	11:20	Yak-7	north of Murmashi	45	29 October 1942	13:56	MiG-3?	
22	2 September 1942	11:25	P-40	vicinity of Murmashi	46	5 November 1942	10:55	LaGG-3	PQ 36 Ost 2920 vicinity of Murmashi
23	5 September 1942	08:25	Hurricane	north of Murmashi	47	23 March 1943	14:15	P-40	
24	5 September 1942	08:32	MiG-3		48	23 March 1943	14:18	P-40	
25	5 September 1942	08:40	MiG-3	vicinity of Kola railway	49	23 March 1943	14:20	P-39	
26	8 September 1942	11:35	P-39						
– 11. Staffel of Jagdgeschwader 27 – Mediterranean Theater — 1 June – 31 December 1943
— ? (Note: This claim was listed as confirmed in the 1995 published book "Messerschmitt Bf 109 in Action with the III. and IV./Jagdgeschwader 27, 1938 – 1945".)	1 October 1943	—	Boston	northwest of Kos	60	31 October 1943	15:15	P-38	Cape of Rodon
—	1 October 1943	—	Boston	northwest of Kos	61	31 October 1943	15:20	P-38	southwest of Cape of Rodon
50	5 October 1943	12:23	B-24	Petromogula	62	2 November 1943	13:47	Spitfire	west-southwest of Skoutari
51	5 October 1943	12:33	B-24	Lake Yliki	63	2 November 1943	13:47	Spitfire	west-southwest of Skoutari
52	8 October 1943	13:15	P-38	30 km (19 mi) south of Lebadeia	64	4 November 1943	16:25	Boston	west of Durrës
53	8 October 1943	13:52	P-38	7 km (4.3 mi) south-southwest of Cape Vourlias	65	15 November 1943	13:10	P-38	southeast of Kalamaki
54	8 October 1943	13:55	P-38	5 km (3.1 mi) west of Velanidia	66	15 November 1943	13:10	P-38	southeast of Kalamaki
55	23 October 1943	13:11	Spitfire	south-southwest of Podgorica	67	15 November 1943	13:11	P-38	southeast of Kalamaki
56? (Note: According to Mathews and Foreman this claim is unconfirmed.)	25 October 1943	—	P-38	north of Cape of Rodon	68	15 November 1943	13:12	P-38	southeast of Kalamaki
57	25 October 1943	13:17	Whitley	south of Stari Bar	69	17 November 1943	12:50	B-25	northeast of Kalamaki
58	25 October 1943	13:20	P-38	south of Stari Bar	70	17 November 1943	12:52	B-25	northeast of Kalamaki
59	25 October 1943	13:22	P-38	south of Stari Bar	71	17 November 1943	12:58	P-38	east of Marathon
– 11. Staffel of Jagdgeschwader 27 – Defense of the Reich — March – May 1944
72	11 April 1944	16:32	P-38	20 km (12 mi) northwest of Graz	78?	24 April 1944	—	P-51	north of Waldkraiburg
73	23 April 1944	08:20	Spitfire	10 km (6.2 mi) southwest of Celje	79	28 April 1944	10:38	P-51	15 km (9.3 mi) northeast of Ljubljana
74	23 April 1944	08:22	Spitfire	15 km (9.3 mi) southwest of Celje	80	28 April 1944	10:39	P-51	15 km (9.3 mi) northeast of Ljubljana
75	23 April 1944	08:23	Spitfire	20 km (12 mi) southwest of Celje	81	19 May 1944	13:25	P-47	15 km (9.3 mi) southwest of Quenstedt
76	24 April 1944	13:45	P-51	10 km (6.2 mi) west of Mühldorf	82	19 May 1944	13:27	P-47	Quedlinburg; Magdeburg
77	24 April 1944	13:47	P-51	10 km (6.2 mi) west of Mühldorf	83	19 May 1944	13:30	P-51	south of Aschersleben; Magdeburg
– 11. Staffel of Jagdgeschwader 27 – In defense of the Normandy Invasion — June – August 1944
84	14 June 1944	07:28	P-47	Argentan	90	22 June 1944	14:10	Spitfire	west-southwest of Caen
85	14 June 1944	07:29	P-47	Falaise	91	22 June 1944	14:17	P-51	10 km (6.2 mi) southwest of Caen
86	14 June 1944	07:30	P-47	Argentan	92	24 June 1944	15:05	P-51	south of Flers
87	14 June 1944	08:05	P-47	15 km (9.3 mi) southwest of Paris	93	24 June 1944	15:08	P-51	10 km (6.2 mi) southwest of Flers
88	16 June 1944	20:47	P-47	west of Dives-sur-Mer	94	25 June 1944	09:05	P-38	15 km (9.3 mi) southeast of Blois
89	16 June 1944	20:48	P-47	Dives-sur-Mer					
– 15. Staffel of Jagdgeschwader 27 – Defense of the Reich — December 1944
95	8 December 1944	09:50	P-51	northwest of Achmer	97?	23 December 1944	—	P-47	vicinity of Bad Godesberg
96	18 December 1944	13:48	P-51	PQ 05 Ost S/PN, Eifel area					

=== Awards ===
- Iron Cross (1939) 2nd and 1st Class
- Honor Goblet of the Luftwaffe on 5 October 1942 as Unteroffizier and pilot
- German Cross in Gold on 20 October 1942 as Unteroffizier in the 8./Jagdgeschwader 5
- Knight's Cross of the Iron Cross on 13 November 1942 as Unteroffizier and pilot in the 8./Jagdgeschwader 5

== See also ==
- List of solved missing person cases (pre-1950)
