= Rodderberg =

Extinct volcano in Wachtberg, Germany

Coordinates: 50°38′33″N 7°11′54″E

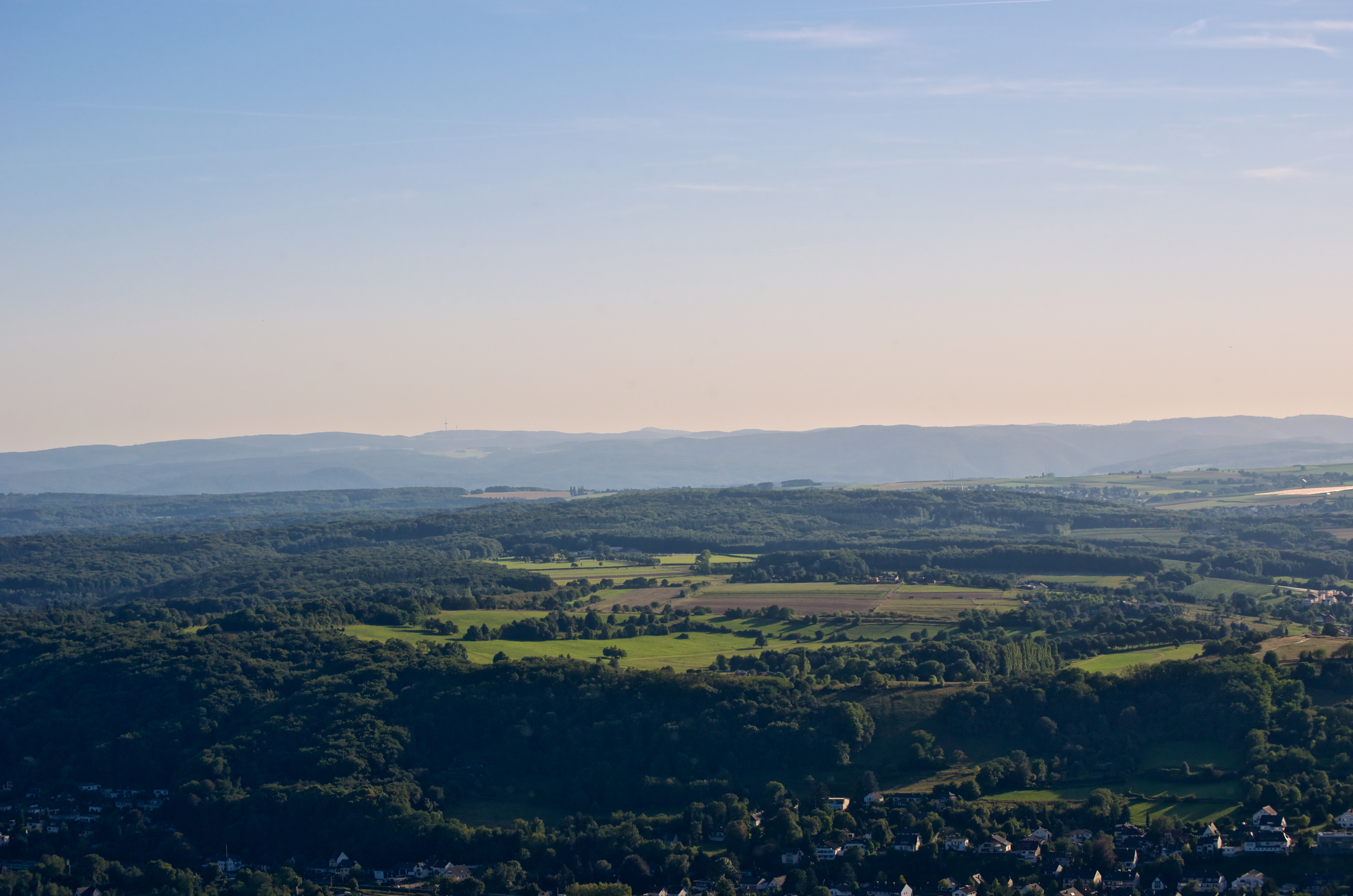

The Rodderberg is an extinct volcano in the east of the municipality of Wachtberg near Bonn, Germany. The last eruption was 250,000 years ago.

It is situated just above the Rhine valley. Together with the Drachenfels directly opposite, the Rodderberg narrows the Rhine valley. This gorge portion is the southern limit of the lowland-bay of Cologne.

The Rodderberg offers views to the Siebengebirge, the Rhine valley and up to the Cologne Cathedral, about 50 km away.

== Geology ==
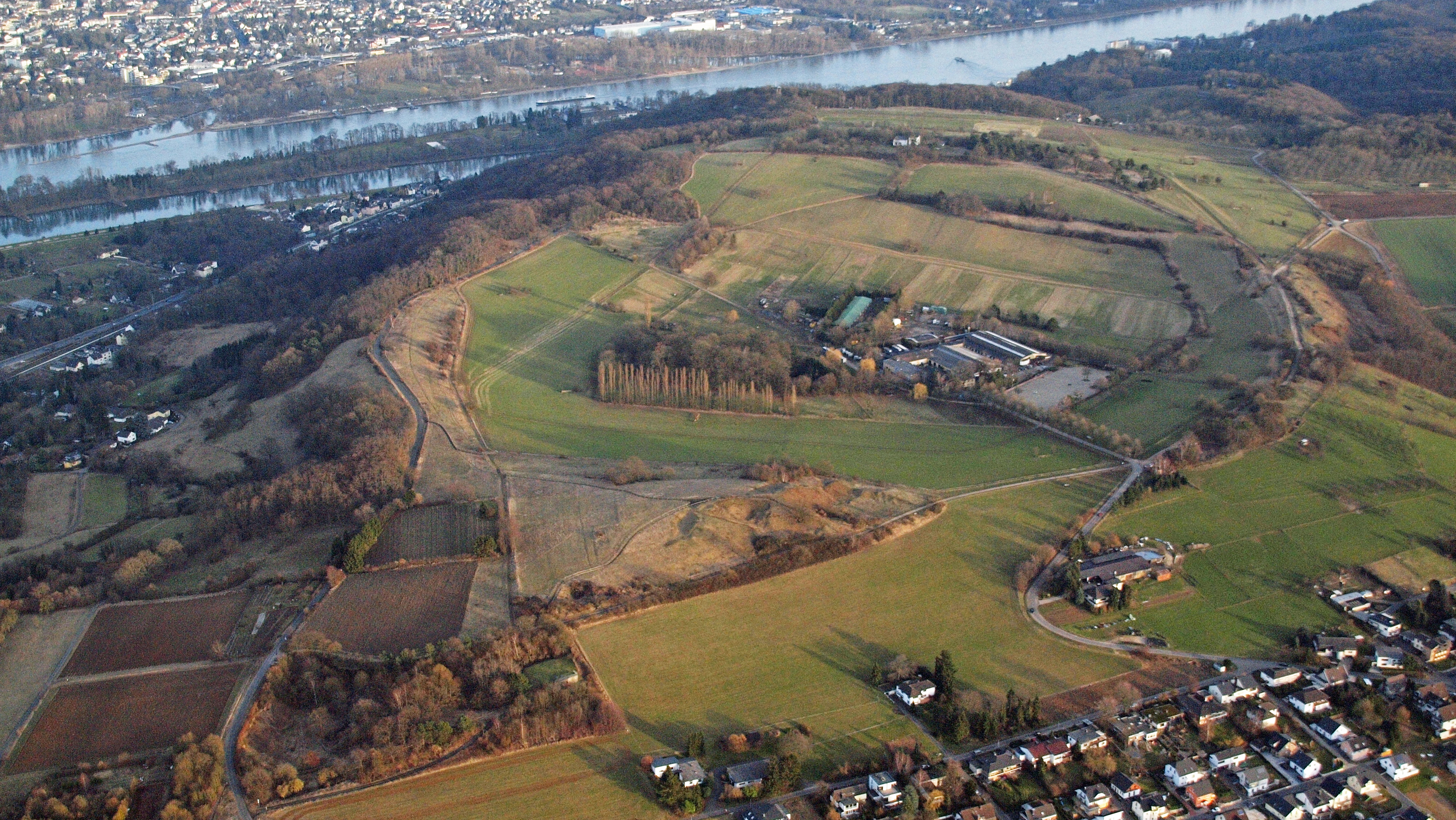
Aerial view of the Rodderberg

The Rodderberg detonated in a phreatomagmatic eruption about 250,000 years ago. This happened when the magmatic plume reached the groundwater level of the Rhine (about 50 m higher than today). After the explosion, the crater was filled with water that formed a maar of about 90 m depth. In the last 250,000 years this feature filled with dust and soil until it was filled up to today's level.

The Rodderberg is now a small hill that has a shallow concave shape.

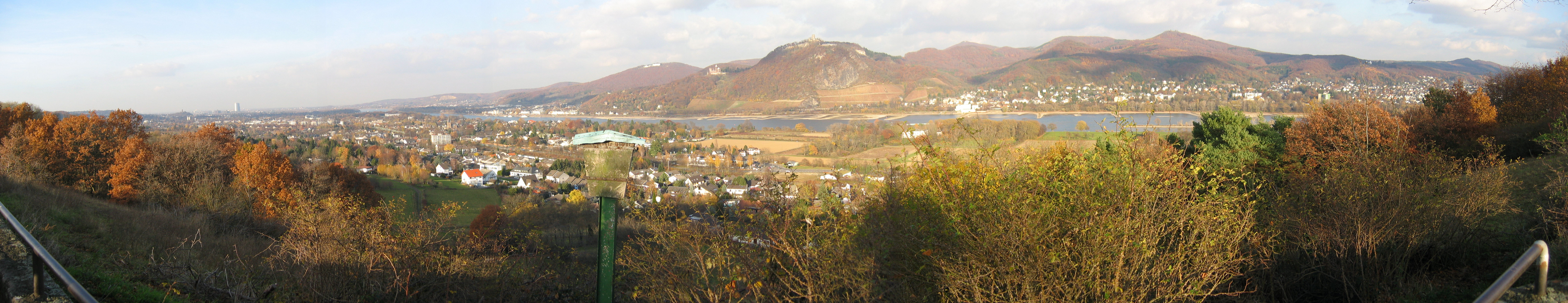
View from the top of the Rodderberg
