= Israel Bird =

State senator in South Carolina

Member of the South Carolina Senate

Member of the South Carolina Senate from Fairfield County
- In office 1876–1880
- Preceded by: Moses Martin
- Succeeded by: Henry Augustus Gaillard

Personal details
- Party: Republican

Israel Bird was a state senator in South Carolina. An African American Republican, he served two terms in the South Carolina Senate. He represented Fairfield County from 1876 to 1878 and from 1878 to 1880. He was preceded in office by Moses Martin and succeeded by Henry Augustus Gaillard.

Bird is recorded in the Journal of the Senate in 1876, 1878, and 1879. His post office was in Winnsboro, South Carolina in 1878.

In 1877, R. H. Gleaves served as Lieutenant Governor of South Carolina and President of the South Carolina Senate. He swore in new members. Bird was noted as Israel Bird. His votes were noted on various matters.

== See also ==
- African American officeholders from the end of the Civil War until before 1900
