= Godesberger Bach =

River in Germany

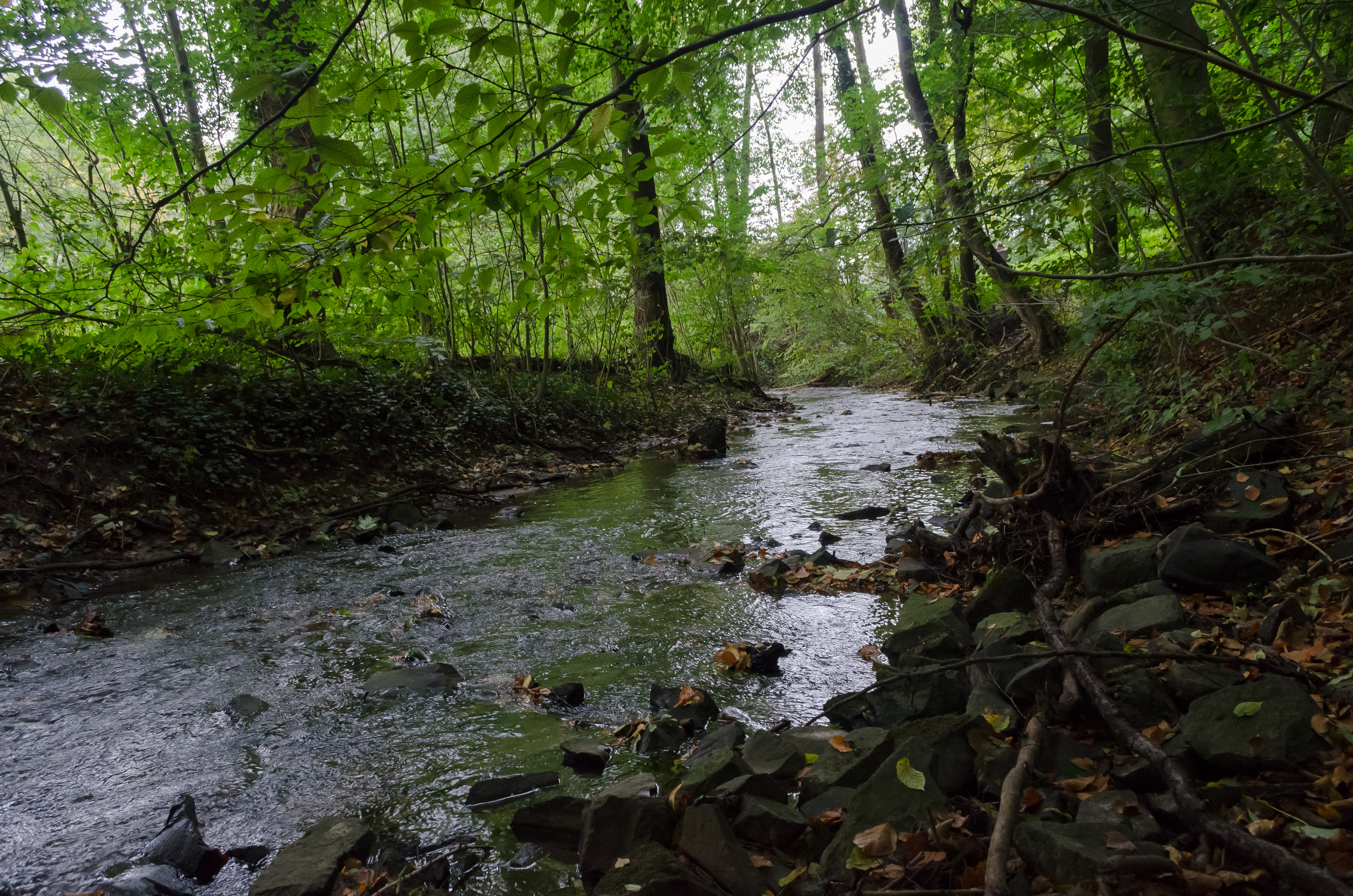

Location
- Country: Germany
- State: North Rhine-Westphalia

Physical characteristics
- Mouth
  - location: Rhine
  - coordinates: 50.6939°N 7.1700°E
- Length: 15.5 km (9.6 mi)

Basin features
- Progression: Rhine→ North Sea

Godesberger Bach (also Arzdorfer Bach) is a river in Wachtberg and Bonn, in North Rhine-Westphalia, Germany. It is a left tributary of the Rhine in Bad Godesberg.

== See also ==
- List of rivers of North Rhine-Westphalia
