= Senator Byrd =

Senator Byrd may refer to:

== Members of the United States Senate ==
- Harry F. Byrd (1887–1966), U.S. Senator from Virginia from 1933 to 1965
- Harry F. Byrd Jr. (1914–2013), U.S. Senator from Virginia from 1965 to 1983
- Robert Byrd (1917–2010), U.S. Senator from West Virginia from 1959 to 2010

== United States state senate members ==
- Adam M. Byrd (1859–1912), Mississippi State Senate
- Harriet Elizabeth Byrd (1926–2015), Wyoming State Senate
- Harry F. Byrd (1887–1966), U.S. Senator from Virginia from 1933 to 1965
- Richard C. Byrd (1805–1854), Arkansas State Senate
- Robert K. Byrd (1823–1885), Tennessee State Senate

== See also ==
- Senator Bird (disambiguation)
