= Michael Bird (politician) =

American politician

Member of the Colorado Senate from the 9th district
- In office January 1987 – January 1995
- Preceded by: Joel Hefley
- Succeeded by: Charles R. Duke

Member of the Colorado House of Representatives from the 18th district
- In office January 1983 – January 1987
- Preceded by: Frank H. Randall Jr.
- Succeeded by: Thomas W. Ratterree

Personal details
- Born: Michael Conrad Bird
- Party: Republican
- Spouse: Ursula Steinhoff
- Education: Western Maryland College; University of Colorado Boulder (PhD)

Michael Conrad Bird is an economics lecturer, and was a Republican member of the Colorado State Senate from 1987 to 1995.

Bird graduated from Western Maryland College in 1961, and gained his Ph.D. from the University of Colorado Boulder. He joined Colorado College in 1968, and was a Fulbright Lecturer in Mexico in 1966 through 1968, and Peru in 1971.

In 1973 Bird and fellow Colorado College Professor Fred Sondermann were elected to city council of Colorado Springs on a "Sensible Growth" ticket. Bird went on to become a Colorado state representative in 1983 and state senator in 1987.

After a failed bid to become Governor of Colorado in 1993, losing out to businessman Bruce Benson in the GOP due to his superior financial resources, and being time barred to extend his stay in the Senate in 1994, he returned to the world of education as a lecturer at Colorado College.

In 2004, Bird became Professor Emeritus of Economics at Colorado College, a position he still holds.

Bird is married to Ursula Steinhoff-Bird, the daughter of World War II Luftwaffe ace and former North Atlantic Treaty Organization military commander, Johannes Steinhoff.
