= Moses Martin =

South Carolina Reconstruction legislator

Moses Martin was an American farmer, A.M.E. Church organizer, county commissioner, elections commissioner, and state legislator in South Carolina. He represented Fairfield County, South Carolina in the South Carolina Senate. He helped found White Hall A.M.E. Church in Jenkinsville.

Martin was enslaved from the time of his birth in South Carolina. He was documented as being "mulatto".

He submitted his resignation as county commissioner in 1871 after receiving a death threat from the Ku Klux Klan, but South Carolina governor Robert Kingston Scott refused to accept it.

== See also ==
- African American officeholders from the end of the Civil War until before 1900

"Moses Martin was an elected South Carolina State Senator who served as a fearless member of the first and only Black majority legislature in the history of the United States from 1868 to 1872. It was famously referred to as the "Radical South Carolina Legislature."
