= Villip, Wachtberg =

Coordinates: 50.6368°N 7.0941°E

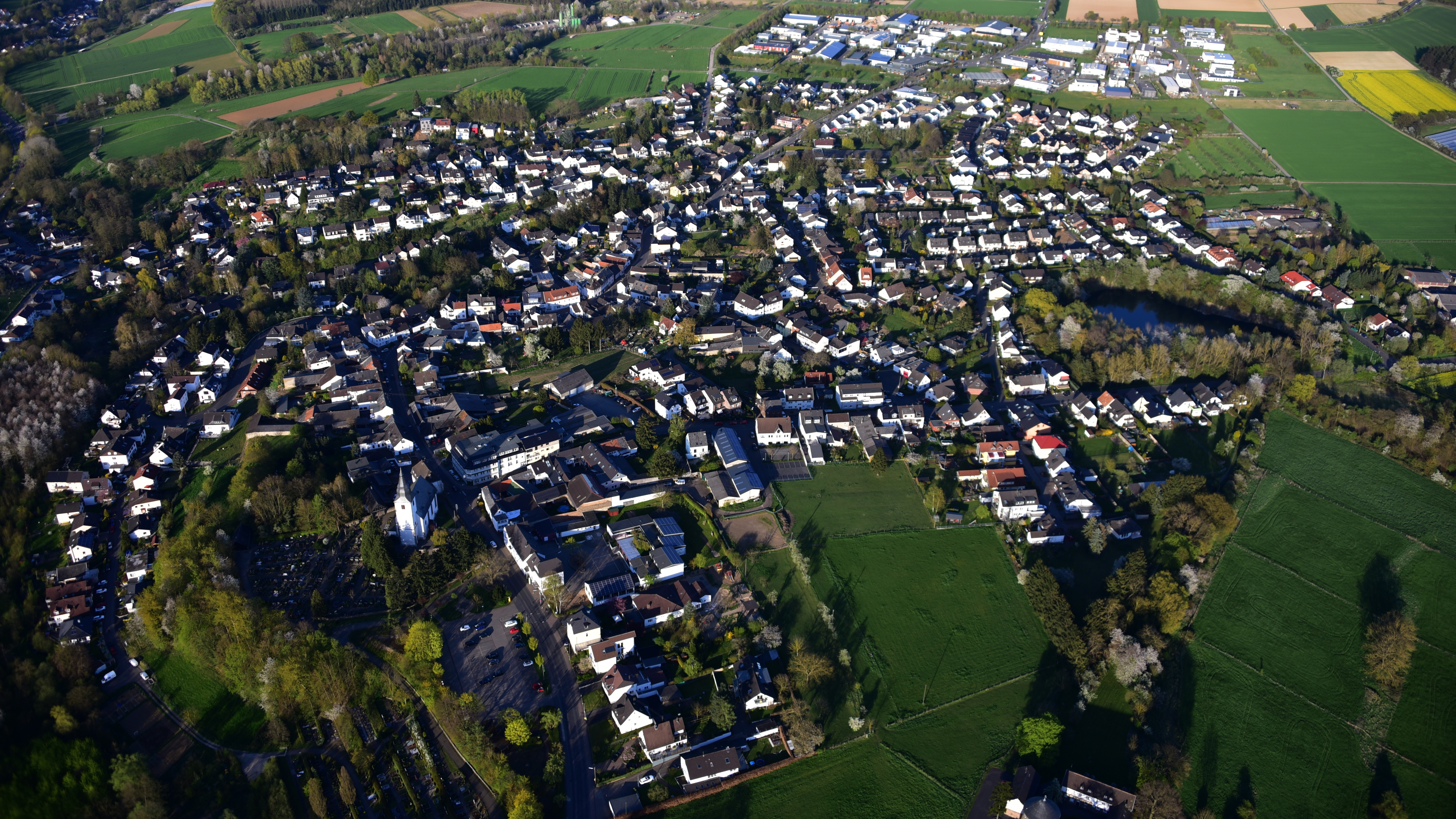

Villip is a village in the municipality of Wachtberg in the Rhein-Sieg-Kreis in the state of North Rhine-Westphalia close to the town of Meckenheim in Germany.

The village was first referenced on 10 June 873 as Philuppa. The king, Louis the German, included it under the manor of the monastery of Stablo.
