= Wachtberg =

- Municipality
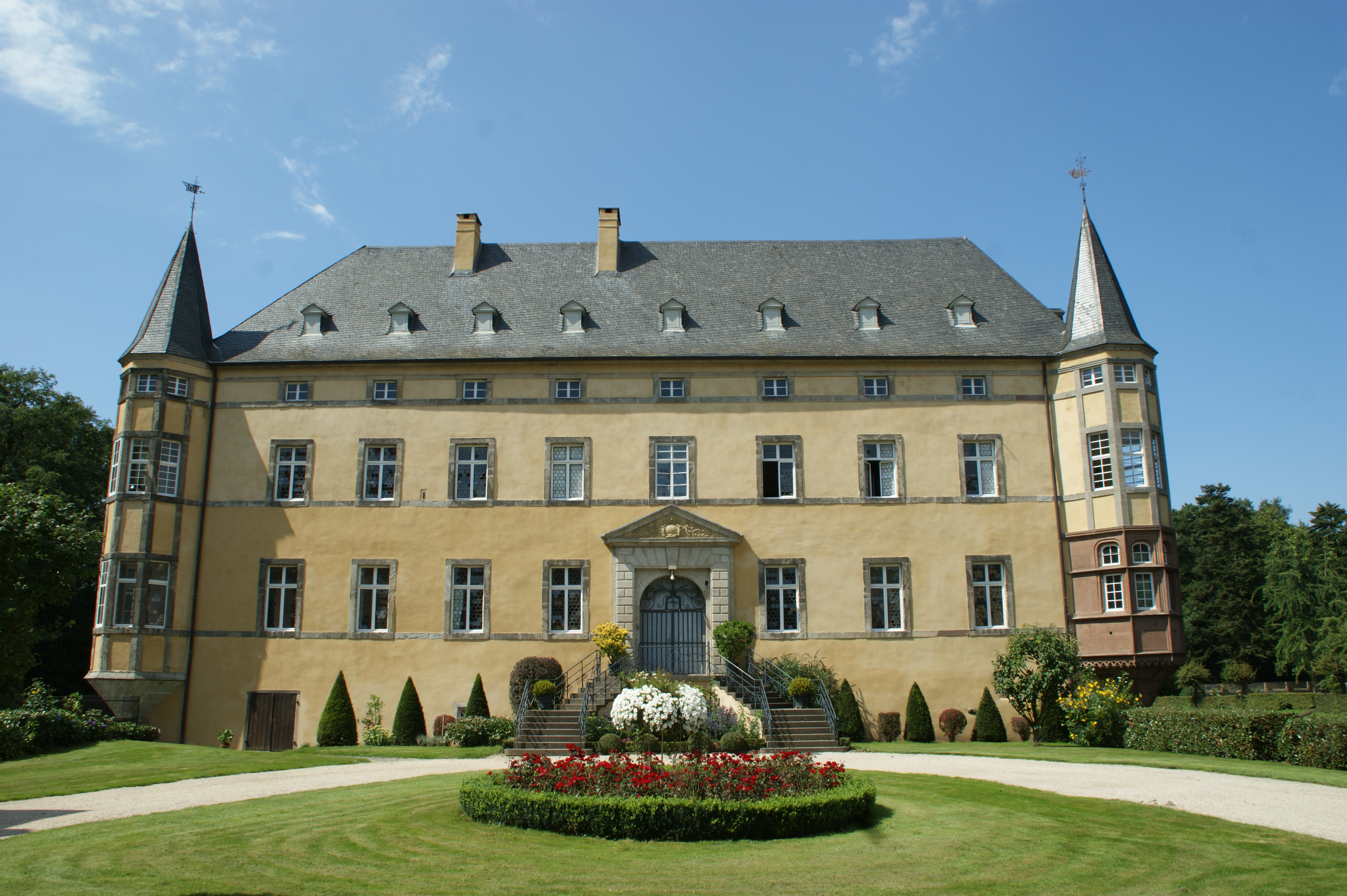
- The water castle Adendorf

- Flag Coat of arms

- Location of Wachtberg within Rhein-Sieg-Kreis district
- Interactive map of Wachtberg
- Location within Germany Location within North Rhine-Westphalia
- Coordinates: 50°37′N 07°08′E
- Country: Germany
- State: North Rhine-Westphalia
- Admin. region: Köln
- District: Rhein-Sieg-Kreis
- Subdivisions: 13

Government
  - Mayor (2020–25): Jörg Schmidt (CDU)

Area
  - Total: 49.68 km^{2} (19.18 sq mi)
- Elevation: 75–269 m (246–883 ft)

Population (2025-12-31)
  - Total: 20,230
  - Density: 407.2/km^{2} (1,055/sq mi)
- Time zone: UTC+01:00 (CET)
  - Summer (DST): UTC+02:00 (CEST)
- Postal codes: 53343
- Dialling codes: 0228 (Bonn), 02225 (Meckenheim)
- Vehicle registration: SU
- Website: www.wachtberg.de

Wachtberg (German pronunciation: [ˈvaxtbɛʁk]) is a municipality in the Rhein-Sieg district, of North Rhine-Westphalia, Germany. It is situated approximately 15 km south of Bonn. In December 2025 the Wachtberg municipality had 20,230 inhabitants.

== Geology ==
=== Geological situation ===
Wachtberg is located on the left bank of the Rhine between the Kottenforst forest to the north, the Voreifel to the west, the lower Middle Rhine Valley to the east and the Ahrgebirge to the south. The municipality was named after one of its highest points, the Wachtberg, located between Berkum and Villip (extinct for 25 million years, now with a height of 258 m).

=== Political division ===
The municipality was formed in 1969 with the Bonn Act (formally Gesetz zur kommunalen Neugliederung des Raumes Bonn, abbreviated as the "Bonn-Gesetz") and merged 13 now incorporated villages:

- Adendorf (with Klein-Villip)
- Arzdorf
- Berkum
- Fritzdorf
- Gimmersdorf
- Holzem
- Ließem
- Niederbachem
- Oberbachem (with Kürrighoven)
- Pech
- Villip (with Villiprott)
- Werthhoven
- Züllighoven

Until then, most of the villages belonged to the so-called "Amt Villip"; Adendorf, Arzdorf and Fritzdorf were added to the newly founded municipality by the town of Meckenheim. Niederbachem is the biggest village within Wachtberg with 4276 inhabitants (July 2018).

The town-hall is in the village of Berkum, approximately in the center of the area. The Rodderberg mountain is in the east of the Wachtberg district.

== Population ==
Historical population

Year	Pop.	±% p.a.
1965	10,742	—
1970	13,406	+4.53%
1975	15,914	+3.49%
1980	16,573	+0.81%
1985	17,069	+0.59%
1990	17,281	+0.25%
1995	18,716	+1.61%

Year	Pop.	±% p.a.
2000	18,870	+0.16%
2005	19,926	+1.09%
2010	20,202	+0.28%
2015	20,457	+0.25%
2020	20,331	−0.12%
2025	20,230	−0.10%

Source: Landesdatabank Nordrhein-Westfalen

== Landmarks ==
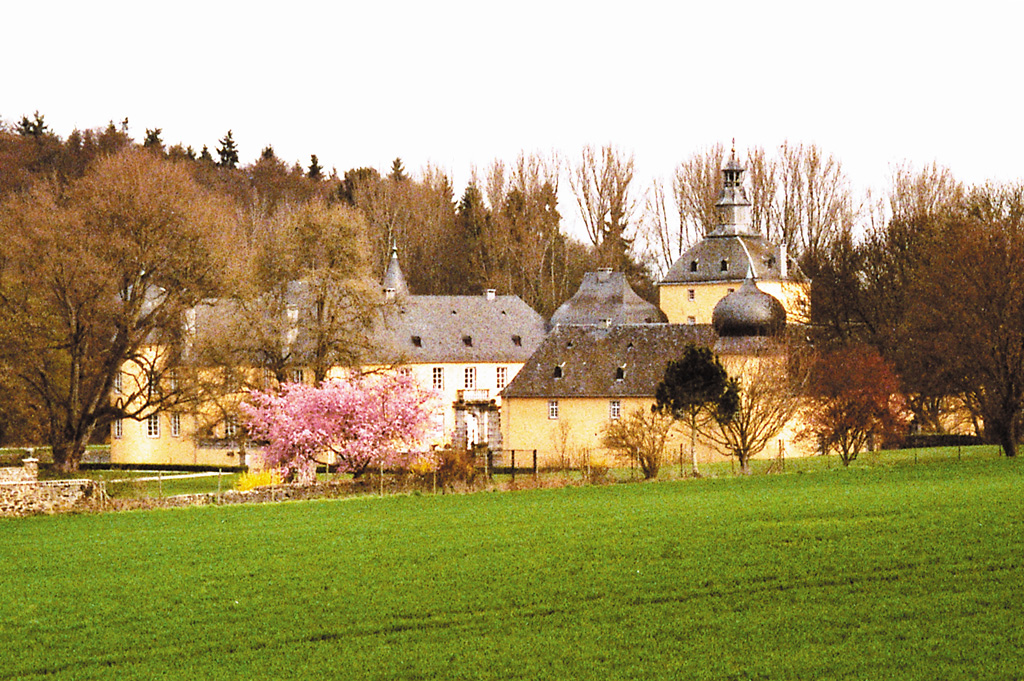
The water castle Gudenau

Four water castles are still inhabited:

- Burg Münchhausen (near Adendorf)
- Wasserburg Adendorf (near Adendorf)
- Burg Gudenau (near Villip)
- Burg Odenhausen (near Berkum)

Several water mills are situated on the streams, of which the Broicher Mühle near Villip is in continuous use since 886.

At the top of the mountain Wachtberg there is a cenotaph, built in 1923 by 10 of the 13 villages.

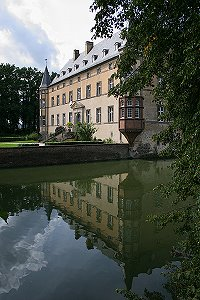
The water castle Adendorf

The radome near Berkum has a diameter of 49 m.

In contrast to this several villages have ensembles of timber framed houses.
