= Ernst-Wilhelm Reinert =

German fighter ace and Knight's Cross recipient

- Born: 2 February 1919; Cologne-Lindenthal, Germany
- Died: 5 September 2007 (aged 88); Bad Pyrmont, Germany
- Military career
- Allegiance: Nazi Germany; West Germany
- Branch: Luftwaffe (Wehrmacht); German Air Force (Bundeswehr)
- Service years: 1939–1945; 1956–1972
- Rank: Hauptmann (captain); Oberstleutnant (lieutenant colonel)
- Commands: 3./JG 77, 8./JG 27, 12./JG 27; 2./JaBoG 31
- Conflicts: See battles World War II: Operation Barbarossa; Operation Cerberus; Mediterranean Theatre; Defense of the Reich; Operation Bodenplatte
- Awards: Knight's Cross of the Iron Cross with Oak Leaves and Swords
- Other work: Heilpraktiker

Ernst-Wilhelm Reinert (2 February 1919 – 5 September 2007) was a German Luftwaffe military aviator during World War II, a fighter ace credited with 174 enemy aircraft shot down in 715 combat missions. The majority of his victories were claimed over the Eastern Front, with 51 in the Mediterranean theatre and 20 over the Western Front. He was "ace-in-a-day" four times, shooting down five or more aircraft on a single day.

Born in Cologne-Lindenthal, Reinert volunteered for military service in the National Socialist Luftwaffe in 1938. Following flight training, he was posted to Jagdgeschwader 77 (JG 77—77th Fighter Wing). He fought in Operation Barbarossa, the German invasion of the Soviet Union, and claimed his first aerial victory on 8 August 1941. He received the Knight's Cross of the Iron Cross following his 53rd aerial victory. Accumulating further victories, he surpassed the century mark in October 1942 for which he was awarded the Knight's Cross of the Iron Cross with Oak Leaves. In November 1942, his unit was transferred to the Mediterranean theatre in support of the Afrika Korps. There, Reinert claimed 51 victories against the Western Allies. In August 1943, he was appointed Staffelkapitän (squadron leader) of 3. Staffel (3rd squadron) of JG 77, and in February 1944 the 8. Staffel of Jagdgeschwader 27 (JG 27—27th Fighter Wing) based in France. Reinert was then appointed Gruppenkommandeur (group commander) of IV. Gruppe (4th group) of JG 27 and, credited with 174 aerial victories, received the Knight's Cross of the Iron Cross with Oak Leaves and Swords on 30 January 1945. He then received conversion training to the then new Messerschmitt Me 262 jet fighter and was posted to Jagdgeschwader 7 (JG 7—7th Fighter Wing), an all-jet fighter wing.

In 1956, Reinert joined the newly established German Air Force of West Germany. He retired in 1972, his final rank was Oberstleutnant (lieutenant colonel), and died on 5 September 2007 in Bad Pyrmont.

== Early life and career ==
Ernst-Wilhelm Reinert was born 2 February 1919 in Cologne-Lindenthal, at the time in the Rhine Province of the Free State of Prussia. He was the son of an executive secretary (Obersekretär) with the Deutsche Reichsbahn (German Reich Railway). After attending school in Leverkusen-Schlebusch, he completed his vocational education as a metalworker. With the beginning of his vocational education, Reinert learned to fly glider aircraft with the National Socialist Flyers Corps (NSFK), completing his A, B and C-license for glider aircraft.

Following the compulsory Reichsarbeitsdienst (Reich Labour Service), Reinert volunteered for military service of Nazi Germany with the Luftwaffe in early 1938. Eight days after joining, he was discharged on medical grounds which required an operation. In January 1939, he was admitted to the Reichsschule für Motorflug (motor powered flight school of the Reich) at Bielefeld where he attained his A/2 license. On 14 April 1939, Reinert was called back into the Luftwaffe, at first serving with a Fliegerausbildungs-Regiment (flight training regiment), and received three months of recruit training. He was then trained as a fighter pilot at various flight and fighter pilot schools. (Note: Flight training in the Luftwaffe progressed through the levels A1, A2 and B1, B2, referred to as A/B flight training. A training included theoretical and practical training in aerobatics, navigation, long-distance flights and dead-stick landings. The B courses included high-altitude flights, instrument flights, night landings and training to handle the aircraft in difficult situations.)

== World War II ==
World War II in Europe had begun on Friday, 1 September 1939, when German forces invaded Poland. On 1 December 1940, Reinert was promoted to Unteroffizier (corporal). At the time he was based in Bordeaux, France with the Ergänzungsgruppe, a supplementary training unit, of Jagdgeschwader 77 (JG 77—77th Fighter Wing). This unit was tasked with patrolling the Atlantic coast.

=== Eastern Front ===
On 14 June 1941, Reinert was transferred to II. Gruppe (2nd group) of JG 77 where he was assigned to 4. Staffel (4th squadron). With this unit, he participated in Operation Barbarossa, the invasion of the Soviet Union, which marked the beginning of the Eastern Front on 22 June 1941. JG 77, augmented by I.(J)./Lehrgeschwader 2 (LG 2—2nd Demonstration Wing), primary role in Operation Barbarossa was to support the German advance as part of Army Group South. During this campaign, Reinert was awarded the Iron Cross 2nd Class (Eisernes Kreuz zweiter Klasse) on 31 July 1941. A week later, at 13:42 on 8 August 1941, he was credited with his first aerial victory, a Polikarpov I-16 fighter. On 28 September 1941, he received the Front Flying Clasp of the Luftwaffe for Fighter Pilots in Gold (Frontflugspange für Jagdflieger in Gold), at the time he was credited with 16 aerial victories. One day later, he received the Iron Cross 1st Class (Eisernes Kreuz erster Klasse).

II. Gruppe, which was scheduled for replenishment and conversion to the Bf 109 F-4 in Germany, flew its last mission of 1941 following the Battle of Rostov on 2 December northeast of Rostov. The next day, the unit began relocating to Germany, first to Schweidnitz, present-day Świdnica, and then to Vienna-Aspern. On 7 February 1942, Reinert was awarded the Honour Goblet of the Luftwaffe (Ehrenpokal der Luftwaffe) for 24 victories. Shortly after this, Reinert was transferred west in support of Operation Donnerkeil. The objective of this operation was to give the German battleships Scharnhorst and Gneisenau and the heavy cruiser Prinz Eugen fighter protection in the breakout from Brest to Germany. The Channel Dash operation (11–13 February 1942) by the Kriegsmarine (Navy) was codenamed Operation Cerberus by the Germans. In support of this, the Luftwaffe under the leadership of General der Jagdflieger (General of the Fighter Force) Adolf Galland, formulated an air superiority plan dubbed Operation Donnerkeil for the protection of the three German capital ships. Following this assignment, Reinert was transferred back to II. Gruppe still based at Vienna-Aspern. On 11 March 1942, II. Gruppe began transferring back to the Eastern Front, first stop was Proskurov, present-day Khmelnytskyi, Ukraine. On 15 March, they reached Bukarest before they reached Sarabus, present-day Hwardijske, located 10 kilometers (6.2 miles) north of Simferopol on the Crimean peninsula on 17 March 1942. At the time, 4. Staffel was commanded by Oberleutnant (first lieutenant) Heinrich Setz while II. Gruppe was led by Hauptmann Anton Mader.

On 19 March, Reinert claimed three Soviet aircraft including two Petlyakov Pe-2s. On 3 May, Reinert claimed two Polikarpov I-153 fighters belonging to 9 IAP/VVS-ChF (Black Sea Fleet). By June Reinert had become one of leading aces in JG 77 with Anton Hackl and Setz. Reinert was promoted to Feldwebel (staff sergeant) on 1 May 1942 and after 44 aerial victories, he received the German Cross in Gold (Deutsches Kreuz in Gold) on 18 May 1942.

On 9 June, Reinert claimed three victories for his 49th to 51st. On this day, JG 77 was involved in dogfights over the besieged city of Sevastopol. Reinert engaged the 3rd OAG (Osobaya Aviatsionnaya Gruppa—Special Aviation Group) ChF and 6 GIAP ChF. He claimed a Polikarpov I-16 for his 49th victory. On 1 July 1942, after 53 aerial victories, Reinert received the Knight's Cross of the Iron Cross (Ritterkreuz des Eisernen Kreuzes) which was presented to him by II. Gruppe's commander Mader. Reinert shot down 26 Soviet aircraft in July 1942. On 14 July 1942, the day Reinert claimed three Bell P-39 Airacobras shot down, he crashed his Bf 109 F-4 (Werknummer 13 117—factory number) during the landing at Kastornoje. The aircraft was 70% destroyed and he sustained minor injuries. On 26 July, he was again wounded in a flying accident. His Bf 109 F-4 (Werknummer 8280—factory number) had technical problems, the engine caught fire. This forced Reinert to bail out over friendly territory and resulted in a broken arm. A period in hospital followed. Reinert returned to the front in September. On 16 September, 4./JG 77 bounced a formation of Ilyushin Il-2 ground-attack aircraft south-east of Voronezh and Reinert claimed two shot down.

On 3 October 1942, Reinert passed the century mark with four claims. He was the 27th Luftwaffe pilot to achieve the century mark. That day, the Rotte, a pair of aircraft, Reinert and his wingman Unteroffizier Rudolf Flindt had been ordered to fly from Stary Oskol to Kursk with the plan to intercept the daily Soviet reconnaissance aircraft. During the takeoff, the German airfield came under attack by a flight of Soviet Il-2 ground-attack aircraft escorted by Mikoyan-Gurevich MiG-3 and Lavochkin-Gorbunov-Gudkov LaGG-3 fighter aircraft. Reinert shot down two Il-2s before his 20 mm MG 151/20 cannon jammed. This forced him to continue the fight with only his two MG 131 machine guns operationally. Reinert managed to shoot down two further aircraft, two MiG-3s claimed at 14:17 and 14:20. In this encounter, Flindt was credited with two aerial victories. At the time, Reinert was also credited with the destruction of 14 aircraft on the ground in addition to the 103 aerial victories. On 6 October, he was awarded the Knight's Cross of the Iron Cross with Oak Leaves (Ritterkreuz des Eisernen Kreuzes mit Eichenlaub). Reinert, together with Alfred Druschel, Johannes Steinhoff, Günther Rall and Max Stotz received the Oak Leaves from Adolf Hitler personally on 4 November 1942. A flying ace or fighter ace is a military aviator credited with shooting down five or more enemy aircraft during aerial combat. Reinert was only the second Feldwebel in the Luftwaffe to receive the award, after Gerhard Köppen.

=== North Africa ===
In early 1941, the Oberkommando der Wehrmacht (OKW—Supreme Command of the Armed Forces) had sent an expeditionary force, to North Africa to support the Regio Esercito Italiano (Royal Italian Army) fighting in the North African Campaign. As intensity of combat increased, the OKW committed additional military forces to the Mediterranean theatre. First elements of JG 77 had already been committed to this theatre in February 1942. The Axis defeat at the Second Battle of El Alamein (23 October—4 November 1942) and the 8 November 1942 Operation Torch landings had pushed the Axis out of Morocco, Algeria, Egypt and Libya into Tunisia. On 10 November 1942, Reinert's II. Gruppe was also withdrawn from the Eastern Front and began relocating to North Africa. On 5 December 1942, the Gruppenstab (headquarters unit), 4. and 6. Staffel arrived at Zazur, 15 kilometres (9.3 miles) west of Tripoli, Libya. During the relocation, II. Gruppe stopped at Munich for two weeks. There, Reinert got in trouble with the authorities and was briefly confined to quarters for not properly saluting an elderly senior officer.

Reinert was thrust into aerial combat in this final phase of the North African Campaign—the Battle of Tunisia. On 2 January 1943 Reinert claimed two P-40s from No. 250 Squadron RAF while escorting Tactical Reconnaissance Hurricanes from 40 Squadron SAAF. His wingman Unteroffizier Weidlich claimed the other. Pilot Officer S. Holland, Flight Sergeant Graham and Sergeant J. H . Baron were the casualties—they were reported as prisoner of war, safe but wounded in action and killed in action respectively. Five days later on 7 January, II./JG 77 engaged and shot down three Spitfires while the RAF claimed two Bf 109s destroyed and damaged. Two of the No. 92 Squadron RAF pilots can be identified—Flight Sergeant Broomhall was killed and Sergeant Patterson parachuted to safety. On 11 January Reinert claimed four victories over Spitfires and a single P-40. In this battle Franz Hrdlicka also claimed a Spitfire. Reinert misidentified his first three opponents who were all P-40s from the 64th and 65th Fighter Squadrons of the US 57th Fighter Group. On 17 January B-17 Flying Fortress' from the US 97th Bombardment Group and escorted by P-38 Lightnings from the US 1st Fighter Group crossed into Tunisia from airfields in Algeria. JG 77 and Italian fighters intercepted. Reinert shot down the P-38 flown by Lieutenant Burton Weil. On 20 January 1943 Reinert shot down a Curtiss P-40 Warhawk piloted by Lieutenant Richard Kimball of the 65th Fighter Squadron who was taken prisoner of war. Reinert claimed again on 6 February. He attacked a formation of No. 112 Squadron RAF P-40s and claimed two as they attacked artillery and motor transport near Ras Agadir. Sergeant R. Le Cours was shot down and another P-40 was badly damaged. On 23 February Reinert claimed two Spitfires. The first was probably Sergeant S. G. T. Twine of No. 152 Squadron RAF.

The Axis won a series of offensive successes at Sidi Bou Zid and the Kasserine Pass in February 1943. A confident Erwin Rommel ordered the 5th Panzer Army under Hans-Jürgen von Arnim to begin operation Ochsenkopf on 26 February. The Royal Air Force (RAF) Desert Air Force responded by attacking all known German and Italian airfields in the region to deny the Axis air support for the offensive. JG 77 were involved in large-scale air battles and claimed 26 P-40s for nine losses and two pilots killed. Heinrich Bär claimed five and Reinert was credited with four in one mission. Their opponents were from the 7 SAAF Wing. The South African unit records confirm 14 losses. JG 77 claimed 13 of them. The following day II./JG 77 bounced 12 P-40s attacking German airfields and Reinert claimed two for his 123rd and 124th victories. A further three fell to other pilots. On 7 March JG 77 engaged Spitfires over the Mareth Line. Heinz-Edgar Berres, Bär and two other pilots shot down a Spitfire. In the afternoon, Reinert claimed a brace of Spitfires west of Medenine. The latter was probably over a No. 145 Squadron RAF pilot.

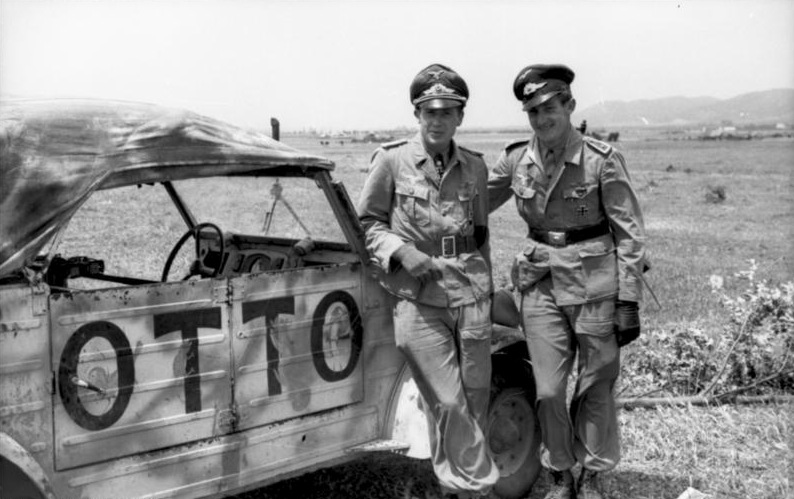
Leutnant Reinert (left) and Feldwebel Maximilian Volke standing next to Hans-Joachim Marseille's "Otto" Kübelwagen, April 1943

On 1 March Martin B-26 Marauders and P-38 Lightnings attacked the bridge at La Hencha. Reinert claimed one Marauder and two of the escorting P-38s. Three B-26s were lost. In the morning of the 13 March Reinert claimed two P-39s. In fact they were P-40s from the 57th Fighter Group which lost four The American unit involved in the air battles was the US 57th Fighter Group escorted by Spitfires from 244 Wing RAF. Among the losses were Major Robert F. Worley, commanding the 314th Fighter Squadron was shot down but evaded capture and reached American lines. Major Archie Knight, the 57th Fighter Group operations officer, was also shot down. He also evaded capture by swimming undercover of darkness and reaching British lines. Lieutenant William E. Jenks and Robert Douglas of the 314th Fighter Squadron were also shot down: the latter was captured and the former was killed. In the afternoon Geschwaderkommodore (wing commander) Joachim Müncheberg led I./JG 77 over Gabès. On this sortie, Reinert claimed four victories, after Müncheberg ordered them to attack some low-flying United States Army Air Force (USAAF) P-39 Airacobras while returning to base. Eight of the P-39s were claimed shot down in 12 minutes. The claims were Reinert's 132nd–135th. The 81st Fighter Group confirmed the loss of seven P-39s, despite the escort of the 31st Fighter Group's Spitfires. The P-39s were from the 91st and 93rd Squadrons. The Spitfires were from 307 and 308 Squadron. Nine American fighters were lost in total: Lieutenants Murray, Turkington, Smith, Leech, McCreight and Lewis from the 93rd and Lyons from the 91st. Another pilot was captured. Only Murray returned alive from the group.

On 26 March Reinert accounted for Sergeant J. H. D. Herberte. Herberte had been flying with Spitfire Vs and IXs of No. 145 Squadron RAF when they were attacked by II./JG 77. It appears this was the only loss. The Germans lost one pilot killed also. Three days later, on 29 March 1943, Reinert claimed two USAAF P-40s and his wingman Unteroffizier Funke claimed another. II./JG 51's Oberleutnant Rammelt claimed his 20th victory. JG 77 lost three pilots over the airfield when P-40s attacked low-flying Bf 109s—Rudolf Fischer, Ewald Bleul and Gunter Schimmelpfennig were killed. Reinert's victims were from the US 79th Fighter Group. Captain Kenneth D. Boggs was killed, Lieutenant Harlan E. Highfield was captured and the third pilot escaped to Allied lines. On 30 March Siegfried Freytag led I./JG 77 against USAAF bombing raids. The Bf 109s engaged the US 52nd Fighter Group, which was escorting 18 A-20 Havoc bombers from the 47th Bombardment Group en route to attacking La Fauconnerie. Reinert claimed two bombers before the P-40s claimed two German fighters. Reinert became an officer when he was promoted to Leutnant (second lieutenant) on 1 April 1943.

On 1 April Reinert became an "ace in a day". In the morning he claimed three Spitfires from the US 31st Fighter Group, specifically the 308th and 309th Fighter Squadrons. Lieutenant O'Brien, Juhnke and Strole were killed. Three Bf 109s were damaged. A further two claims were made against the US 52nd Fighter Group. Lieutenant Edwin Boughton was killed. Other Spitfires may have force-landed but American records generally list only those that caused the death of a pilot. On 4 April, JG 77 engaged in a day of heavy air combat with the new commanding officer Johannes Steinhoff and lost three pilots. Steinhoff and Reinert claimed one and three respectively: Steinhoff's claim was against a Spitfire in the afternoon. Reinert's opponents were P-40s from the US 33rd Fighter Group. Fredrick W. Mayo Jr, James H. Raddin and Alfred J. Schmidt were captured on this date. Mayo and Schmidt were shot down by Reinert. The next day Operation Flax began an intensive aerial offensive against Axis transport aircraft and airfields. On 16 April Reinert's 4. Staffel with 2. and 3./JG 77 formed a 15-strong fighter escort for 13 Italian Savoia-Marchetti SM.82 transports. No. 145 Squadron RAF led by Wing Commander Ian Gleed intercepted the mixed Axis force over Cape Bon. The Germans failed to protect the Italians and seven transports were shot down along with Bf 109 (Werknummer 16 485), "White 9" and its pilot Leutnant Rüdiger. JG 77 claimed four Spitfires—one for Bär and Berres. Reinert also claimed a victory, recorded as a P-51 Mustang. Gleed, who was killed in action that day along with his wingman, flew a clipped-wing Spitfire LF. Vb coded IR-G and Reinert mistook the unusual Spitfire for a Mustang.

Three days later, on 19 April, Reinert claimed another P-51. Once more, this was probably a misidentified clipped-wing Spitfire. The identity of this victory was either Lieutenant Maurice Langberg who was captured or Second Lieutenant Edwin C. Smithers who was killed . The pilots belonged to the 2nd and 4th Fighter Squadrons of the 52nd Fighter Group which claimed four German fighters. It may have also been Warrant Officer Williams of No. 608 Squadron RAF. The victory was Reinert's 150th of the war. By the 25 April 1943 the Axis front was collapsing. On this day Reinert led an attack on USAAF P-39s from the 350th Fighter Group. Reinert claimed one and the Americans lost five. Captain Howes and Lieutenant O'Connor were killed. In the afternoon he claimed the Spitfire J17616 flown by Royal Canadian Air Force (RCAF) Warrant Officer Bruce Edward Anderson, with 145 Squadron. Anderson died of wounds.

On 6 May Axis forces held a narrow strip of territory on the coast near Tunis. The acute fuel shortages forced German fighters to operate in pairs. JG 77 lost two pilots killed. At 10:55 Reinert claimed his 153rd victory over a Spitfire. Only III./JG 77 claimed a further victory. On 8 May JG 77 decided to evacuate its headquarters from Korobus airfield. Reinert took off in a Bf 109 sitting on the lap of Leutnant Zeno Bäumel and carrying 4. Staffel's chief mechanic Oberfeldwebel Walter inside the fuselage. On the flight to Sicily Reinert spotted and attacked a Grumman F4F Wildcat "Martlet" which crashed into the sea.

=== Air war over Italy ===
On 8 May 1943, JG 77 evacuated from Tunisia to various airfields in Sicily while I. Gruppe was sent to Munich. The original intent was to give the Geschwader a period of rest. On 11 May, II. Gruppe moved from Trapani to the Italian mainland at Foggia for replenishment. After a month of rest, on 19 June 1943, the Gruppe relocated back to Trapani. In June and early July the USAAF and British and Commonwealth Air Forces, after initial resistance, attained air superiority. At this time the Mediterranean Air Command had 146 American and 121 British and Commonwealth squadrons available and in range of Sicily. The Axis had 838 operational aircraft including 434 Sicily-based fighter and fighter bomber–aircraft.

By 15 June 1943, some 19 main airfields with 12 minor airstrips were available. Air Chief Marshal Sir Arthur Tedder ordered all-out attacks to destroy Axis aviation in and over Sicily. On 10 July 1943 Operation Husky began and by 18 July only 25 German fighters remained. Allied air power had completely bombed-out the Axis air forces. JG 77, which formed part of the ad hoc Jagdgruppe Vibo Valentia, lost the last of its fighters when 80 German and Italian aircraft were destroyed in one attack on 16 July, eliminating the fighter group. By 20 July I. and II./JG 77 had been pulled out of Sicily to Calabria, on the mainland, where Reinert continued to fly combat sorties over Sicily.

Reinert claimed his first aerial victory in Sicily on 7 August. Two P-40s shot down at 11:45 and 11:54 respectively, took his total of aerial victories to 156. On 13 August 1943, a flight of six Bf 109s from I. Gruppe and nine Bf 109s from II. Gruppe took off at 09:45 on an escort mission for five Dornier Do 217 from Kampfgeschwader 100 which were on an anti-shipping mission. On this mission, the flight encountered 25 to 30 P-40s north coast of Sicily. Reinert shot down three P-40's and his Bf 109 G-6 (Werknummer 20 380—factory number) was hit in the radiator forcing him to ditch in the sea north of Milazzo. Reinert nearly drowned and was shot at by Italian soldiers before he returned to his unit on 14 August. The campaign ended with the Axis withdrawal on 17 August. Reinert claimed two P-40s the following day.

On 7 September 1943, I. Gruppe lost the Staffelkapitän (squadron leader) of 3./JG 77 Oberleutnant Gerhard Strasen who was wounded in combat. In consequence, Reinert was transferred from II. Gruppe to I. Gruppe, replacing Strasen as Staffelführer, acting squadron leader. Reinert served in this position until 1 December 1943, when he was officially appointed as Staffelkapitän of 3./JG 77.

=== Defence of the Reich ===
In April 1944, Reinert was posted to Jagdgeschwader 27 (JG 27—27th Fighter Wing), at first flying with 1. Staffel from an airfield at Fels am Wagram in Defence of the Reich. At 13:39 on 24 April, he claimed the final destruction (endgültige Vernichtung) of an already damaged Boeing B-17 Flying Fortress bomber. That day, the United States Army Air Forces (USAAF) with a force of 754 heavy bombers, escorted by 867 fighter aircraft, targeted German aircraft manufacturing and airfields in Southern Germany. According to the authors Prien and Rodeike, this transfer was considered a disciplinary action, a measure for redemption in combat. The authors state, that particularly Oberstleutnant Johannes Steinhoff, the commander of JG 77 at the time, had a number of pilots transferred for redemption in defense of the Reich combat, this measure included pilots Reinert, Major Heinrich Bär, Hauptmann Lutz-Wilhelm Burckhardt, Oberfeldwebel Herbert Kaiser, and Oberfeldwebel Alexander Preinfalk. On 13 May 1944, Reinert was appointed Staffelkapitän of 12. Staffel of JG 27. Command had been transferred from Oberleutnant Franz Stigler who took command of 8. Staffel of JG 27. On 1 August 1944, Reinert was promoted to Oberleutnant.

JG 27 was transferred in June to the invasion front, flying over Caen and claiming a P-47 Thunderbolt on 27 June. Two further victories over Normandy followed, although Reinert was injured on 17 June and 5 July. On 1 August, IV. Gruppe was withdrawn from the Invasion front. They relocated to Champfleury-la-Perthe, an airfield approximately 90 kilometers (56 miles) south of Reims, before they arrived in Hustedt, present-day part of Celle, for a period of replenishment and refitting. In mid-August, the JG 27 expanded its Gruppen by a fourth Staffel. In consequence, 12. Staffel was renamed to 14. Staffel and received factory new Bf 109 G-14 aircraft.

=== Group commander and end of war ===
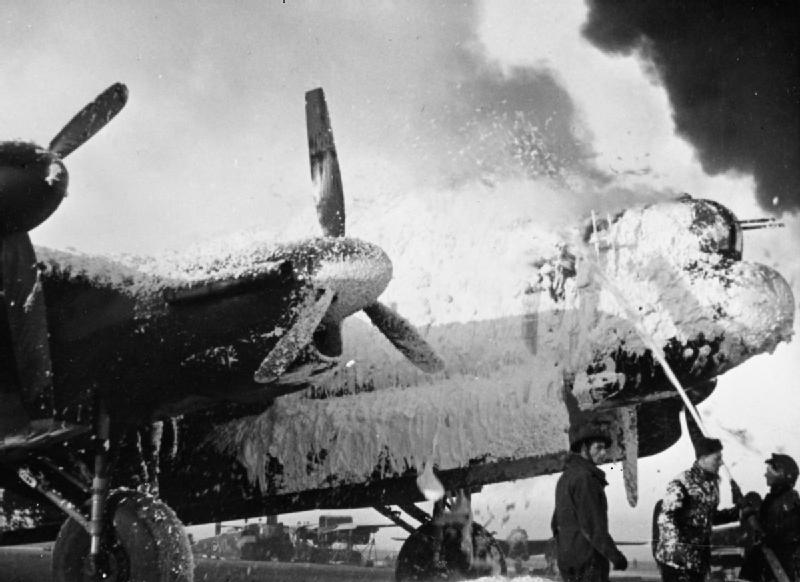
Fire crews attempt to save an Avro Lancaster from burning at Melsbroek, Belgium. This aircraft had landed at Melsbroek with the starboard inner engine out of action and the propeller feathered.

On 1 January 1945, JG 27 participated in Operation Bodenplatte, a Luftwaffe mass attack against Allied airfields in the Benelux area. The operation resulted in hundreds of aircraft losses on both sides and was an operational failure of the Luftwaffe. JG 27, augmented by VI. Gruppe of Jagdgeschwader 54, was ordered to attack the airfield at Brussels-Melsbroek. IV. Gruppe of JG 27, led by Hauptmann Heinz Dudeck, took off from Achmer shortly before 08:30. During the attack, IV./JG 27 made five strafing attacks on Brussels-Melsbroek, claiming multiple aircraft destroyed. IV./JG 27 did not suffer any casualties over the target area. However, on the return flight to Achmer, three aircraft were shot down, including Dudeck who was taken prisoner of war. On 5 January 1945, Reinert succeeded Dudeck as Gruppenkommandeur (group commander) of VI. Gruppe.

In Reinert's first month of command, VI. Gruppe saw little action in January 1945, largely due to the relatively bad weather conditions in Germany. On 23 January, one Bf 109 was lost in combat with P-51s near Lengerich, otherwise no claims nor losses were recorded. Reinert, together with Erich Hartmann, Werner Schröer, Günther Rall and others, was posted to a group commanders training course at Königsberg, present-day Chojna in western Poland. On 1 February 1945, he received a telegram announcing that he had been awarded the Knight's Cross of the Iron Cross with Oak Leaves and Swords (Ritterkreuz des Eisernen Kreuzes mit Eichenlaub und Schwertern). The presentation was made by the commander-in-chief of the Luftwaffe, Reichsmarschall Hermann Göring at the Reichsluftfahrtministerium (RLM—Ministry of Aviation) in Berlin on 23 February 1945. At the same time, Reinert was promoted to Hauptmann, the promotion backdated to 1 January 1945.

In March 1945, the increasing Allied air superiority forced JG 27 to abandon its bases at Achmer and Rheine. On 18 March, it was decided to relocate JG 27 further east, to airfields in the vicinity of Lippstadt. On 21 March and prior to its relocation, VI. Gruppe was annihilated at Achmer by an attack of 180 Consolidated B-24 Liberator bombers of the USAAF Eighth Air Force which destroyed 37 of the 38 remaining Bf 109 on the ground. On 31 March, it was decided to disband VI. Gruppe. It was not possible to replenish the unit with new aircraft. The majority of its personnel were assigned to various Fallschirmjäger and infantry units destined to fight in the Battle of Berlin.

On 23 March 1945, Reinert had been transferred to I. Gruppe of Jagdgeschwader 7 (JG 7—7th Fighter Wing) for conversion training to the Messerschmitt Me 262 jet fighter. The Gruppe was commanded by Major Wolfgang Späte and at the time based at Brandenburg-Briest. Reinert did not fly any combat missions on the Me 262. Before the end of World War II in Europe, the unit relocated multiple times, from Berlin to Prague, to Lagerlechfeld, to Munich–Holzkirchen, Plattling and to Mühldorf. There, on 8 May 1945, he was taken prisoner of war by US forces.

== Later life ==
In September 1945, Reinert was released from US captivity and pursued a career in business as an industrial sales representative. On 1 April 1956, he reentered military service in the Bundeswehr as an Hauptmann in the West German Air Force, at the time referred to as the Bundesluftwaffe. Following various training courses, he was appointed Staffelkapitän of the 2. Staffel of Jagdbombergeschwader 31 "Boelcke" (JaBoG 31—Fighter-Bomber Wing 31), named after the World War I fighter pilot Oswald Boelcke and at the time under the command of Oberstleutnant (Lieutenant Colonel) Gerhard Barkhorn. The unit was initially equipped with the Republic F-84F Thunderstreak and based at the Nörvenich Air Base. On 19 January 1959, JaBoG 31 became the first German Air Force wing to be assigned to NATO. On 1 March 1959, Reinert was promoted to Major.

For the next four years, Reinert commanded the flying elements of Jagdbombergeschwader 35 (JaBoG 35—Fighter-Bomber Wing 35), at the time under the command of Oberstleutnant Karl Henze. JaBoG 35 existed from 1959 to 1966 and was then reformed as Leichtes Kampfgeschwader 41 (LeKG 41—Light-Bomber Wing 41). Reinert then served as staff officer with the 3. Luftwaffendivision (3rd Luftwaffe Division) and as chief of the air-ground firing range at the Sylt Air Base near Westerland. On 1 March 1971, he was promoted to Oberstleutnant. His final posting was to the Luftflottenkommando (Air Force Forces Command) at Köln-Wahn where he served as a staff officer. Reinert retired from military service on 30 September 1972.

Reinert then became a certified Heilpraktiker, a healing practitioner, in Bad Pyrmont. Until his deteriorating health prohibited otherwise, he continued to fly civil aircraft as hobby. He died on 5 September 2007 in Bad Pyrmont.

== Summary of career ==
=== Aerial victory claims ===
According to US historian David T. Zabecki, Reinert was credited with 174 aerial victories. Obermaier also lists Reinert with 174 enemy aircraft shot down in 715 combat missions, of which 103 were claimed over the Eastern Front, with 51 in the Mediterranean theatre and 20 over the Western Front. On 60 ground attack missions, he was also credited with the destruction of 16 aircraft, 10 tanks and 6 locomotives. Spick lists him with 174 aerial victories claimed in over 700 combat missions, and a mission-to-claim ratio of 4.02. Mathews and Foreman, authors of Luftwaffe Aces – Biographies and Victory Claims, researched the German Federal Archives and found records for 168 aerial victory claims, plus nine further unconfirmed claims. This figure includes 103 aerial victories on the Eastern Front and 65 over the Western Allies, including two four-engine bomber.

Victory claims were logged to a map-reference (PQ = Planquadrat), for example "PQ 35364". The Luftwaffe grid map (Jägermeldenetz) covered all of Europe, western Russia and North Africa and was composed of rectangles measuring 15 minutes of latitude by 30 minutes of longitude, an area of about 360 square miles (930 km^{2}). These sectors were then subdivided into 36 smaller units to give a location area 3 km × 4 km (1.9 mi × 2.5 mi) in size.

Chronicle of aerial victories
This and the ♠ (Ace of spades) indicates those aerial victories which made Reinert an "ace-in-a-day", a term which designates a fighter pilot who has shot down five or more airplanes in a single day. This and the – (dash) indicates unconfirmed aerial victory claims for which Reinert did not receive credit. This along with the * (asterisk) indicates a endgültige Vernichtung (final destruction)—a coup de grâce inflicted on an already damaged heavy bomber. This and the ? (question mark) indicates information discrepancies listed by Prien, Stemmer, Rodeike, Bock, Mathews and Foreman.
Claim	Date	Time	Type	Location	Unit	Claim	Date	Time	Type	Location	Unit
– Claims with Jagdgeschwader 77 on the Eastern Front – Operation Barbarossa — 22 June – 5 December 1941
1	8 August 1941	13:42	I-16		4./JG 77	14	25 September 1941	13:13	DB-3		4./JG 77
2	14 August 1941	15:18	I-16? (Note: According to Prien in his 1995 book, claimed as a Polikarpov I-17. According to Mathews and Foreman, claimed as a Mikoyan-Gurevich MiG-1.)		4./JG 77	15	26 September 1941	09:50	MiG-3		4./JG 77
3	19 August 1941	16:00	I-16		4./JG 77	16	26 September 1941	14:07	I-16		4./JG 77
4	22 August 1941	12:25	I-153		4./JG 77	—	3 October 1941	15:21	I-16		4./JG 77
5	31 August 1941	06:27	SB-3		4./JG 77	17	9 October 1941	13:25? (Note: According to Prien in his 1995 book, and Mathews and Foreman, claimed at 13:20.)	R-10 (Seversky)		4./JG 77
6	31 August 1941	06:30	SB-3		4./JG 77	18	9 October 1941	16:20	R-10 (Seversky)		4./JG 77
7	31 August 1941	17:25	two-engine bomber? (Note: According to Prien in his 1995 book, and Mathews and Foreman, claimed as a Ilyushin DB-3.)		4./JG 77	19	15 October 1941	14:23	SB-3		4./JG 77
8	1 September 1941	17:40	Pe-2		4./JG 77	20	23 October 1941	14:58	SB-3		4./JG 77
9	19 September 1941	05:55	MiG-3		4./JG 77	21	2 November 1941	08:03	R-10 (Seversky)		4./JG 77
10	20 September 1941	16:17	MiG-3		4./JG 77	22	17 November 1941	13:36	I-153		4./JG 77
11	22 September 1941	15:30	MiG-3		4./JG 77	23	27 November 1941	10:10	I-16		4./JG 77
12	22 September 1941	15:35	MiG-3		4./JG 77	24	27 November 1941	11:56	DB-3		4./JG 77
13	23 September 1941	17:12	I-15? (Note: According to Prien in his 1995 book, and Mathews and Foreman, claimed as a Polikarpov I-16.)		4./JG 77	— ? (Note: This unconfirmed claim is not listed by Prien, Stemmer, Rodeike and Bock in the 2003 book.)	27 November 1941	—	unknown		4./JG 77
– Claims with Jagdgeschwader 77 on the Eastern Front – 17 March – 30 April 1942
25	17 March 1942	14:47	I-153		4./JG 77	28	19 March 1942	10:35	I-153		4./JG 77
26	19 March 1942	08:31	Pe-2		4./JG 77	29	18 April 1942	14:50	I-16		4./JG 77
27	19 March 1942	10:25	I-153		4./JG 77	30	21 April 1942	16:35? (Note: According to Mathews and Foreman, claimed at 18:35.)	TB-3?		4./JG 77
– Claims with Jagdgeschwader 77 on the Eastern Front – Kerch, Sevastopol, Izium — May/June 1942
31	1 May 1942	07:50	MiG-1		4./JG 77	43	17 May 1942	08:23	I-153		4./JG 77
32	1 May 1942	07:55	MiG-1		4./JG 77	44	17 May 1942	13:26	I-16		4./JG 77
33	1 May 1942	12:24	MiG-1		4./JG 77	45	20 May 1942	15:53	MiG-1	PQ 35364, Sevastopol	4./JG 77
34	3 May 1942	04:53	I-153		4./JG 77	46	2 June 1942	15:57	DB-3		4./JG 77
35	3 May 1942	07:00	I-153		4./JG 77	47	5 June 1942	09:25	I-153		4./JG 77
36	8 May 1942	07:05	I-153		4./JG 77	48	6 June 1942	19:30	LaGG-3		4./JG 77
37	9 May 1942	12:31	I-153		4./JG 77	49	9 June 1942	13:07	I-16		4./JG 77
38	9 May 1942	12:35	I-153		4./JG 77	50	9 June 1942	16:28	I-16		4./JG 77
39	11 May 1942	17:36	DB-3		4./JG 77	51	9 June 1942	19:12	I-15		4./JG 77
40	13 May 1942	15:23	LaGG-3		4./JG 77	52	13 June 1942	06:23	LaGG-3		4./JG 77
41	13 May 1942	15:26	LaGG-3		4./JG 77	53	13 June 1942	12:27	MiG-1		4./JG 77
42	13 May 1942	15:40	R-5		4./JG 77						
– Claims with Jagdgeschwader 77 on the Eastern Front – 28 June – 7 November 1942
54	7 July 1942	03:52	Il-2		4./JG 77	79♠ (Note: This claim is not listed by Prien in his 1995 book. But it is listed by Mathews and Foreman.)	17 July 1942	18:42	Il-2		4./JG 77
55	7 July 1942	14:54	Yak-1		4./JG 77	80	19 July 1942	06:24	Pe-2		4./JG 77
56	8 July 1942	04:25	Hurricane		4./JG 77	81	19 July 1942	06:35	Pe-2		4./JG 77
57	8 July 1942	04:30	Hurricane		4./JG 77	82	19 July 1942	06:38	Il-2		4./JG 77
58	8 July 1942	04:33	Hurricane		4./JG 77	83	5 September 1942	17:20	Il-2	PQ 82141	4./JG 77
59	8 July 1942	17:05	MiG-1	PQ 85851	4./JG 77	84	5 September 1942	17:23	LaGG-3	PQ 82124	4./JG 77
60	9 July 1942	16:17	LaGG-3		4./JG 77	85	5 September 1942	17:27? (Note: According to Prien in his 1995 book, claimed at 17:25.)	LaGG-3	PQ 82154	4./JG 77
61	10 July 1942	17:54	Yak-1	north of Voronezh	4./JG 77	86	9 September 1942	15:12	Pe-2	PQ 92734	4./JG 77
62	10 July 1942	17:56	Yak-1	north of Voronezh	4./JG 77	87	11 September 1942	06:18	Boston	PQ 92514	4./JG 77
63	11 July 1942	05:28? (Note: According to Prien in his 1995 book, claimed at 05:20.)	LaGG-3		4./JG 77	88	11 September 1942	06:21	Boston	PQ 92394	4./JG 77
64	11 July 1942	05:30	LaGG-3		4./JG 77	89	12 September 1942	15:55	LaGG-3	PQ 92592	4./JG 77
65	11 July 1942	06:05	Yak-4		4./JG 77	90	12 September 1942	16:00	LaGG-3	PQ 92341	4./JG 77
66	12 July 1942	05:26	P-40		4./JG 77	91? (Note: According to Mathews and Foreman, this claim is unconfirmed.)	13 September 1942	13:42	Yak-1		4./JG 77
67	14 July 1942	06:43	P-39		4./JG 77	92	15 September 1942	10:10	Yak-1	PQ 92513	4./JG 77
68	14 July 1942	06:46	P-39		4./JG 77	93	15 September 1942	13:58? (Note: According to Prien in his 1995 book, claimed at 13:28.)	Yak-1	PQ 92383	4./JG 77
69	14 July 1942	06:49	P-39		4./JG 77	94	16 September 1942	06:41? (Note: According to Prien in his 1995 book, claimed at 06:43.)	Il-2	PQ 92373	4./JG 77
70	16 July 1942	17:58	Yak-1		4./JG 77	95	16 September 1942	06:43? (Note: According to Prien in his 1995 book, claimed at 06:49.)	Il-2	PQ 92373	4./JG 77
71	16 July 1942	18:05	Yak-1		4./JG 77	96	16 September 1942	06:48? (Note: According to Prien in his 1995 book, claimed at 06:51.)	Hurricane	PQ 92354, Voronezh	4./JG 77
72♠	17 July 1942	04:20	Il-2		4./JG 77	97	16 September 1942	06:51	Hurricane	PQ 92411	4./JG 77
73♠	17 July 1942	04:22	Il-2		4./JG 77	98	30 September 1942	15:13	Yak-1	PQ 93474	4./JG 77
? (Note: This claim is not listed by Prien, Stemmer, Rodeike and Bock.)	17 July 1942	04:58	Pe-2		4./JG 77	99	2 October 1942	06:46	Pe-2	PQ 92362	4./JG 77
74♠	17 July 1942	06:34	Pe-2		4./JG 77	100	3 October 1942	14:11	Il-2	PQ 92324	4./JG 77
75♠	17 July 1942	06:42	Il-2		4./JG 77	101	3 October 1942	14:14	Il-2	PQ 92142	4./JG 77
76♠	17 July 1942	06:54	Lockheed? (Note: According to Prien in his 1995 book, and Mathews and Foreman, claimed as an Ilyushin Il-2.)		4./JG 77	102	3 October 1942	14:17	Yak-1	PQ 93824	4./JG 77
77♠	17 July 1942	18:35	Il-2		4./JG 77	103	3 October 1942	14:20	Yak-1	PQ 93722	4./JG 77
78♠	17 July 1942	18:40	Il-2		4./JG 77						
– Claims with Jagdgeschwader 77 in North Africa –
104	2 January 1943	15:07	P-40	5 km (3.1 mi) west-southwest of Buerat	4./JG 77	131♠	13 March 1943	17:44? (Note: According to Prien in his 1995 book, claimed at 14:47 over a Curtiss P-40 Warhawk.)	P-39?	50 km (31 mi) west-southwest of Sfax	4./JG 77
105	7 January 1943	15:07	Spitfire	50 km (31 mi) south-southeast of Buerat	4./JG 77	132♠	13 March 1943	17:48	P-39	15 km (9.3 mi) southeast of La Fauconnerie	4./JG 77
106♠	11 January 1943	09:21	Spitfire	12 km (7.5 mi) northwest of Buerat	4./JG 77	133♠	13 March 1943	17:56	P-39	57 km (35 mi) southeast of La Fauconnerie	4./JG 77
107♠	11 January 1943	09:24	Spitfire	7 km (4.3 mi) northwest of Buerat	4./JG 77	134♠	13 March 1943	17:56	P-39	47 km (29 mi) southeast of La Fauconnerie	4./JG 77
108♠	11 January 1943	09:27	P-40	10 km (6.2 mi) northwest of Buerat	4./JG 77	135♠	13 March 1943	18:00	P-39	13 km (8.1 mi) northwest of Maknassy	4./JG 77
109♠	11 January 1943	14:55? (Note: According to Prien in his 1995 book, claimed at 14:35.)	Spitfire	15 km (9.3 mi) southwest of Buerat	4./JG 77	136?	26 March 1943	10:36	Spitfire	southeast of Mareth	4./JG 77
110♠	11 January 1943	14:56	Spitfire	15 km (9.3 mi) southwest of Buerat	4./JG 77	137	29 March 1943	09:22	P-40	25 km (16 mi) southwest of La Fauconnerie	4./JG 77
111	18 January 1943	14:17	P-38	28 km (17 mi) south-southwest of ʽAziziya	4./JG 77	— ? (Note: According to Prien in his 1995 book, this claim was confirmed and is listed as Reinert's 138th aerial victory.)	29 March 1943	09:26	P-40	southwest of La Fauconnerie	4./JG 77
112	19 January 1943	16:05? (Note: According to Prien in his 1995 book, claimed at 15:05.)	B-24	10 km (6.2 mi) southeast of Castel Benito	4./JG 77	— ? (Note: This unconfirmed claim is not listed by Prien, Stemmer, Rodeike and Bock.)	29 March 1943	—	P-40		4./JG 77
113	20 January 1943	11:30	P-40	17 km (11 mi) east of Tarhuna	4./JG 77	138	30 March 1943	09:10	Boston	23 km (14 mi) north-northwest of Maknassy	4./JG 77
114	20 January 1943	11:34	P-40	8 km (5.0 mi) east of Tarhuna	4./JG 77	139	30 March 1943	09:15	Boston	40 km (25 mi) southeast of Sbeitla	4./JG 77
115	5 February 1943	15:03	P-40	15 km (9.3 mi) northwest of Ben Gardane	4./JG 77	140♠	1 April 1943	10:32	Spitfire	6 km (3.7 mi) southwest of La Fauconnerie	4./JG 77
116	5 February 1943	15:07	P-40	8 km (5.0 mi) east of Ben Gardane	4./JG 77	141♠	1 April 1943	10:37	Spitfire	35 km (22 mi) northwest of La Fauconnerie	4./JG 77
117	23 February 1943	13:50	Spitfire	12 km (7.5 mi) northwest of Thala	4./JG 77	142♠	1 April 1943	10:40	Spitfire	50 km (31 mi) northwest of La Fauconnerie	4./JG 77
118	23 February 1943	16:48	P-40	40 km (25 mi) east of Kasserine	4./JG 77	143♠	1 April 1943	18:06	Spitfire	30 km (19 mi) east-southeast of El Guettar	4./JG 77
119	26 February 1943	13:56	P-40	15 km (9.3 mi) northeast of Gabès	4./JG 77	144♠	1 April 1943	18:08	Spitfire	25 km (16 mi) east-northeast of El Guettar	4./JG 77
120	26 February 1943	13:58	P-40	15 km (9.3 mi) southeast of Gabès	4./JG 77	145	4 April 1943	14:28	P-40	20 km (12 mi) northwest of La Fauconnerie	4./JG 77
121	26 February 1943	14:03	P-40	18 km (11 mi) northeast of Zarat	4./JG 77	146	4 April 1943	14:31	P-40	33 km (21 mi) northwest of La Fauconnerie	4./JG 77
122	26 February 1943	14:08	P-40	15 km (9.3 mi) northwest of Ajim	4./JG 77	147	4 April 1943	14:42? (Note: According to Prien in his 1995 book, claimed at 14:32.)	P-40	25 km (16 mi) north of La Fauconnerie	4./JG 77
123	27 February 1943	11:32	P-40	PQ 03 Ost 04144	4./JG 77	148	16 April 1943	15:49	P-51? (Note: According to Prien in his 1995 book, claimed as a Supermarine Spitfire.)	25 km (16 mi) north of Cape Bon	4./JG 77
124	27 February 1943	11:35	P-40	18 km (11 mi) east-southeast of Gabès	4./JG 77	149	19 April 1943	08:32	P-51?	27 km (17 mi) east-southeast of Tunis	4./JG 77
125	1 March 1943	15:02	Boston	10 km (6.2 mi) southeast of Thélepte	4./JG 77	150	25 April 1943	13:02	P-39	5 km (3.1 mi) northeast of Majaz al Bab	4./JG 77
126	1 March 1943	15:07	P-38	5 km (3.1 mi) north-northwest of Thélepte	4./JG 77	151	25 April 1943	18:47	Spitfire	2 km (1.2 mi) south of Reyville	4./JG 77
127	1 March 1943	15:09? (Note: According to Prien in his 1995 book, claimed at 15:08.)	P-38	7 km (4.3 mi) north-northwest of Thélepte	4./JG 77	152	6 May 1943	10:55	Spitfire	northwest of Hammamet	4./JG 77
128	7 March 1943	12:18	Spitfire	1 km (0.62 mi) southeast of Medenine	4./JG 77	153	8 May 1943	16:27	Martlet	northeast of Zembra	4./JG 77
129	7 March 1943	14:54	Spitfire	15 km (9.3 mi) southeast of Medenine	4./JG 77	— ? (Note: This unconfirmed claim is not listed by Prien in his 1995 book.)	8 May 1943	—	Martlet	northeast of Zembra	4./JG 77
130♠	13 March 1943	14:42	P-40	20 km (12 mi) southwest of Gabès	4./JG 77						
– Claims with Jagdgeschwader 77 in Sicily –
154	7 August 1943	11:45	P-40	20 km (12 mi) northwest of Palmi	4./JG 77	160	18 August 1943	19:19	P-40	PQ 13 Ost 59694, northeast of Milazzo	4./JG 77
155	7 August 1943	11:54	P-40	25 km (16 mi) west of Palmi	4./JG 77	161	18 August 1943	19:21	P-40	PQ 13 Ost 59694, 15 km (9.3 mi) south of Palmi	4./JG 77
156	12 August 1943	16:08? (Note: According to Prien in his 1995 book, claimed at 16:09.)	Spitfire	PQ 13 Ost 59534, north of Milazzo	4./JG 77	162?	22 October 1943	11:50	B-25		3./JG 77
157	13 August 1943	10:45	P-40	15 km (9.3 mi) west of Palmi	4./JG 77	163?	6 November 1943	11:12	P-40		3./JG 77
158	13 August 1943	10:54	P-40	50 km (31 mi) northwest of Milazzo	4./JG 77	164?	7 December 1943	15:10	Spitfire		1./JG 77
159	13 August 1943	10:55	P-40	15 km (9.3 mi) north of Milazzo	4./JG 77						
– Claims with Jagdgeschwader 27 in defense of the Reich –
165	24 April 1944	13:39	B-17*	southwest Munich	1./JG 27						
– Claims with Jagdgeschwader 27 in defense of the Invasion –
166	28 May 1944	14:29	P-51	Dessau	12./JG 27	168	2 July 1944	15:12	P-47	10 km (6.2 mi) west Orne estuary	12./JG 27
167	29 May 1944	09:54	P-51	Sankt Pölten	12./JG 27	169	4 July 1944	18:12	Spitfire	15 km (9.3 mi) southeast Caen	12./JG 27
—	27 June 1944	15:45	P-51	west Caen	12./JG 27						
– Claims with Jagdgeschwader 27 in defense of the Reich –
170	2 November 1944	12:50	P-51	Eilenburg	12./JG 27	172	27 December 1944	11:05	Auster	Eupen	12./JG 27
171	26 November 1944	11:40	P-51	Porta Westfalica	12./JG 27						

=== Awards ===
- Wound Badge in Silver
- Front Flying Clasp of the Luftwaffe for Fighter Pilots
  - in Gold (28 September 1941)
  - in Gold with Pennant (18 March 1943) (Note: According to Berger with Pennant "700".)
- Combined Pilots-Observation Badge
- Iron Cross (1939)
  - 2nd Class (31 July 1941)
  - 1st Class (29 September 1941)
- Honour Goblet of the Luftwaffe (Ehrenpokal der Luftwaffe) on 16 February 1942 as Unteroffizier and pilot (Note: According to Obermaier on 7 February 1942.)
- German Cross in Gold on 18 May 1942 as Unteroffizier in the II./Jagdgeschwader 77
- Knight's Cross of the Iron Cross with Oak Leaves and Swords
  - Knight's Cross on 1 July 1942 as Unteroffizier and pilot in the 4./Jagdgeschwader 77
  - 131st Oak Leaves on 7 October 1942 as Feldwebel and pilot in the 4./Jagdgeschwader 77 (Note: According to Scherzer on 5 October 1942. According to Von Seemen as pilot in the 3./Jagdgeschwader 77.)
  - 130th Swords on 1 February 1945 as Oberleutnant and Staffelkapitän of the 12./Jagdgeschwader 27 (Note: According to Von Seemen as Staffelkapitän of the 14./Jagdgeschwader 27.)

=== Dates of rank ===
Wehrmacht
1 December 1940:	Unteroffizier (corporal)
1 May 1942:	Feldwebel (staff sergeant)
1 April 1943:	Leutnant (second lieutenant)
1 August 1944:	Oberleutnant (first lieutenant)
23 February 1945:	Hauptmann (captain), backdated to 1 January 1945
Bundeswehr
1 March 1959:	Major (major)
1 March 1971:	Oberstleutnant (lieutenant colonel)
