= Volke =

Volke is a surname. Notable people with the surname include:

- Igor Volke (born 1950), Estonian ufologist and writer
- Martin Volke (born 1982), Czech ice hockey player
- Maximilian Volke (1915–1944), German World War II flying ace
