= Alexander Preinfalk =

German fighter ace and Knight's Cross recipient (1920–1944)

- Born: 6 February 1920; Baku, Azerbaijan
- Died: 12 December 1944 (aged 24); Bruchsal
- Cause of death: Killed in action
- Burial place: Cemetery in Graben-Neudorf
- Military career
- Allegiance: Nazi Germany
- Branch: Luftwaffe
- Service years: 1940–1944
- Rank: Oberfeldwebel (staff sergeant)
- Nickname: Alex
- Units: JG 51, JG 77, JG 53
- Conflicts: World War II: Operation Barbarossa; Battle of the Caucasus; North African Campaign; Defense of the Reich
- Awards: Knight's Cross of the Iron Cross

Alexander Preinfalk (6 February 1920 – 12 December 1944) was a Luftwaffe ace and recipient of the Knight's Cross of the Iron Cross during World War II. The Knight's Cross of the Iron Cross, and its variants were the highest awards in the military and paramilitary forces of Nazi Germany during World War II. Preinfalk was shot down on 12 December 1944 by an American P-47 over Bruchsal, Germany and died after he bailed out. He was credited with 78 aerial victories, potentially up to 85 claims.

== Early life and career ==
Preinfalk was born on 6 February 1920 in Baku, at the time the capital of the Azerbaijan Democratic Republic. In 1940, he joined the military service of the Luftwaffe. Following flight training and fighter pilot training at Jagdfliegerschule Werneuchen (fighter pilot school), (Note: Flight training in the Luftwaffe progressed through the levels A1, A2 and B1, B2, referred to as A/B flight training. A training included theoretical and practical training in aerobatics, navigation, long-distance flights and dead-stick landings. The B courses included high-altitude flights, instrument flights, night landings and training to handle the aircraft in difficult situations.) he was briefly posted to Jagdgeschwader 51 (JG 51—51st Fighter Wing) in 1941 before he was transferred to II. Gruppe (2nd group) of Jagdgeschwader 77 (JG 77—77th Fighter Wing). There, Preinfalk was assigned to the 5. Staffel (5th squadron)

== World War II ==
World War II in Europe had begun on Friday 1 September 1939 when German forces invaded Poland. With II. Gruppe of JG 77 under command of Hauptmann Anton Mader, Preinfalk participated in Operation Barbarossa, the invasion of the Soviet Union, which marked the beginning of the Eastern Front on 22 June 1941. JG 77, augmented by I.(J). Gruppe of Lehrgeschwader 2 (LG 2—2nd Demonstration Wing), primary role in Operation Barbarossa was to support the German advance as part of Army Group South. On 1 October, Preinfalk's 5. Staffel was placed under command of Oberleutnant Anton Hackl and the German advance ad taken II. Gruppe to an airfield at Mariupol on 10 October. Here on 17 October, Preinfalk was credited with his first aerial victory when he claimed a Soviet Polikarpov I-16 fighter shot down. Two days later, the Gruppe then moved to Taganrog where Preinfalk claimed his second aerial victory, a Polikarpov I-15, on 26 October.

On 6 August 1942, Preinfalk became an "ace-in-a-day", claiming six aerial victories on multiple combat missions. Fighting in the combat area between Voronezh and Yelets in support of Army Group B, Preinfalk claimed a Petlyakov Pe-2 bomber and two Mikoyan-Gurevich MiG-1 fighters before midday. At 18:00, II. Gruppe's airfield at Kastornoye came under aerial attack. Defending against this attack, Preinfalk claimed three further Pe-2 bombers shot down. Following his 60th aerial victory claimed, Preinfalk was awarded the German Cross in Gold (Deutsches Kreuz in Gold) on 3 October and the Knight's Cross of the Iron Cross (Ritterkreuz des Eisernen Kreuzes) on 14 October.

=== North Africa and Italy ===
In early 1941, the Oberkommando der Wehrmacht (OKW—Supreme Command of the Armed Forces) had sent an expeditionary force, to North Africa to support the Regio Esercito Italiano (Royal Italian Army) fighting in the North African Campaign. As intensity of combat increased, the OKW committed additional military forces to the Mediterranean theatre. First elements of JG 77 had already been committed to this theatre in February 1942. The Axis defeat at the Second Battle of El Alamein (23 October—4 November 1942) and the 8 November 1942 Operation Torch landings had pushed the Axis out of Morocco, Algeria, Egypt and Libya into Tunisia. On 10 November 1942, Preinfalk's II. Gruppe was also withdrawn from the Eastern Front and began relocating to North Africa. On 5 December 1942, the Gruppenstab (headquarters unit), 4. and 6. Staffel arrived at Zazur, 15 kilometres (9.3 miles) west of Tripoli, Libya. Reequipping the 5. Staffel with the Messerschmitt Bf 109 G-2 took longer than expected, arriving at Zazur on 18 December.

On 26 March 1943, Preinfalk claimed a Supermarine Spitfire fighter shot down 10 kilometers (6.2 miles) northeast of El Hamma. On 4 April, he claimed another Spitfire shot, this time 25 kilometers (16 miles) northeast of Maknassy. On 8 May 1943, JG 77 evacuated from Tunisia to various airfields in Sicily while I. Gruppe was sent to Munich. The original intent was to give the Geschwader a period of rest. On 11 May, II. Gruppe moved from Trapani to the Italian mainland at Foggia for replenishment. After a month of rest, on 19 June 1943, the Gruppe relocated back to Trapani. In June 1943, Preinfalk was posted to 1. Staffel of Ergänzungs-Jagdgruppe Süd—a supplementary training unit—as a fighter pilot instructor.

In May 1944, Preinfalk was back with JG 77, then serving in the 1. Staffel under command of Oberleutnant Lothar Baumann and based at Tuscania, Italy. Here on 31 May, Preinfalk claimed two Spitfire fighters shot down when the United States Army Air Forces (USAAF) Twelfth Air Force attacked Albano Laziale, Genzano di Roma, Ariccia and Frascati. His opponents were Flight Officer C.M. Cassels who baled out and Warrant Officer J.H. Saville who crash landed and was wounded in the encounter. Both pilots belonged to the RAF No. 43 Squadron and became a prisoner of war. On 9 June, Preinfalk claimed a North American P-51 Mustang escort fighter destroyed, his 74th aerial victory in total and last claim over Italy. That day, the USAAF Fifteenth Air Force had attacked Munich.

=== Defense of the Reich and death ===
In July 1944, Preinfalk was posted to II. Gruppe of Jagdgeschwader 53 (JG 53—53rd Fighter Wing) based in Hustedt in northwestern Germany. The Gruppe under command of Hauptmann Julius Meimberg was fighting in defense of the Reich and largely staffed by inexperienced young pilots. In consequence, Meimberg made Preinfalk a leader of a Schwarm, a flight of four aircraft, within 6. Staffel led by Oberleutnant Alfred Hammer. According to the authors Prien and Rodeike, this transfer was considered a disciplinary action, a measure for redemption in combat. The authors state, that particularly Oberstleutnant Johannes Steinhoff, the commander of JG 77 at the time, had a number of pilots transferred for redemption in defense of the Reich combat, this measure included pilots Preinfalk, Major Heinrich Bär, Hauptmann Lutz-Wilhelm Burckhardt, Leutnant Ernst-Wilhelm Reinert, and Oberfeldwebel Herbert Kaiser.

In early December 1944, II. Gruppe was based at Malmsheim Airfield, flying missions against the fighter-bombers of the USAAF Ninth Air Force. Preinfalk was killed in action on 12 December in aerial combat with a Republic P-47 Thunderbolt fighter 1.5 kilometers (0.93 miles) southwest of Graben-Neudorf. Although he managed to escape of his Bf 109 G-14/AS (Werknummer 165741—factory number) at low altitude, his parachute failed to fully deploy and he fell to his death. Preinfalk was buried in the military section of the Graben-Neudorf cemetery.

== Summary of career ==
=== Aerial victory claims ===
According to US historian David T. Zabecki, Preinfalk was credited with 78 aerial victories. Spick also lists him with 78 aerial victories, approximately 50 of which on the Eastern Front with the remaining claims over the Western Allies, claimed in an unknown number combat missions. Obermaier states that the exact number of aerial victories is uncertain, stating that he was credited with at least 78 victories, potentially 85 claims, including eight heavy bombers. Mathews and Foreman, authors of Luftwaffe Aces — Biographies and Victory Claims, researched the German Federal Archives and found records for 80 aerial victory claims, including 60 claims on the Eastern Front and 30 claims over the Western Allies.

Victory claims were logged to a map-reference (PQ = Planquadrat), for example "PQ 82121". The Luftwaffe grid map (Jägermeldenetz) covered all of Europe, western Russia and North Africa and was composed of rectangles measuring 15 minutes of latitude by 30 minutes of longitude, an area of about 360 square miles (930 km^{2}). These sectors were then subdivided into 36 smaller units to give a location area 3 km × 4 km (1.9 mi × 2.5 mi) in size.

Chronicle of aerial victories
This and the ♠ (Ace of spades) indicates those aerial victories which made Preinfalk an "ace-in-a-day", a term which designates a fighter pilot who has shot down five or more airplanes in one day. This and the ? (question mark) indicates information discrepancies listed by Prien, Stemmer, Rodeike, Bock, Mathews and Foreman.
Claim	Date	Time	Type	Location	Unit	Claim	Date	Time	Type	Location	Unit
– Claims with Jagdgeschwader 77 on the Eastern Front – Operation Barbarossa — June – December 1941
1	17 October 1941	11:17	I-16		5./JG 77	2	26 October 1941	14:20	I-15		5./JG 77
– Claims with Jagdgeschwader 77 on the Eastern Front – March – April 1942
3	19 March 1942	12:02	I-15		5./JG 77	5	27 April 1942	17:30	Yak-1	Yevpatoria	5./JG 77
4	9 April 1942	17:45	I-16		5./JG 77						
– Claims with Jagdgeschwader 77 on the Eastern Front – Kerch, Sevastopol, Izium — May/June 1942
6	9 June 1942	19:30	I-153		5./JG 77	8	13 June 1942	18:31	Il-2		5./JG 77
7	13 June 1942	12:20	MiG-1		5./JG 77	9	14 June 1942	14:52	LaGG-3		5./JG 77
– Claims with Jagdgeschwader 77 on the Eastern Front – Summer offensive — 28 June – 7 November 1942
10	6 July 1942	14:30	Boston		5./JG 77	36♠	6 August 1942	18:08	Pe-2	PQ 82121; 65 km (40 mi) northwest of Voronezh	5./JG 77
11	9 July 1942	18:25	LaGG-3		5./JG 77	37	12 August 1942	05:54	Il-2	PQ 83592; 50 km (31 mi) north-northwest of Voronezh	5./JG 77
12	9 July 1942	18:36	MiG-3		5./JG 77	38	12 August 1942	05:56	Yak-1	PQ 83863; 55 km (34 mi) north-northwest of Voronezh	5./JG 77
13	16 July 1942	14:15	Pe-2		5./JG 77	39	12 August 1942	14:03? (Note: According to Mathews and Foreman claimed at 14:05.)	MiG-1	PQ 83812; 50 km (31 mi) south of Yelets	5./JG 77
14	16 July 1942	14:20	Pe-2		5./JG 77	40	12 August 1942	14:11	MiG-1	PQ 83532; 20 km (12 mi) south-southwest of Yelets	5./JG 77
15	17 July 1942	18:47	Pe-2		5./JG 77	41	13 August 1942	10:52	Il-2	PQ 83673; 30 km (19 mi) south of Yelets	5./JG 77
16	21 July 1942	18:41	Hurricane		5./JG 77	42	18 August 1942	14:57	MiG-3	PQ 83673; 30 km (19 mi) south of Yelets	5./JG 77
17	21 July 1942	19:16	Hurricane		5./JG 77	43	23 August 1942	10:26	LaGG-3	PQ 92791; 10 km (6.2 mi) northwest of Sloboda	5./JG 77
18	23 July 1942	19:08	Il-2		5./JG 77	44	5 September 1942	17:14	LaGG-3	PQ 82173; 65 km (40 mi) east-northeast of Tim	5./JG 77
19	23 July 1942	19:14	Il-2		5./JG 77	45	5 September 1942	17:20	Il-2	PQ 82151; 65 km (40 mi) northwest of Voronezh	5./JG 77
20	24 July 1942	05:36	LaGG-3		5./JG 77	46	5 September 1942	17:22	LaGG-3	PQ 82121; 65 km (40 mi) northwest of Voronezh	5./JG 77
21	24 July 1942	05:48	LaGG-3		5./JG 77	47	9 September 1942	15:46	Il-2	PQ 82752; 20 km (12 mi) northwest of Sloboda	5./JG 77
22	24 July 1942	11:25	Pe-2		5./JG 77	48	13 September 1942	15:00	P-39	PQ 92114	5./JG 77
23	25 July 1942	18:42	Pe-2		5./JG 77	49	15 September 1942	17:03	LaGG-3	PQ 92141; 25 km (16 mi) north of Voronezh	5./JG 77
24	26 July 1942	10:31	Il-2		5./JG 77	50	15 September 1942	17:04	LaGG-3	PQ 92143; 25 km (16 mi) north of Voronezh	5./JG 77
25	28 July 1942	06:27	MiG-3		5./JG 77	51	17 September 1942	05:51	LaGG-3	PQ 92123; 15 km (9.3 mi) north of Voronezh	5./JG 77
26	28 July 1942	18:18	P-39	PQ 92393; 20 km (12 mi) southeast of Voronezh	5./JG 77	52	17 September 1942	05:52	LaGG-3	PQ 92154; 25 km (16 mi) north of Voronezh	5./JG 77
27	29 July 1942	06:51	MiG-1	PQ 93554; 15 km (9.3 mi) south of Lipetsk	5./JG 77	53	17 September 1942	05:54	Il-2	PQ 92132; 30 km (19 mi) north-northwest of Voronezh	5./JG 77
28	31 July 1942	15:45	Il-2	PQ 82194; 60 km (37 mi) northwest of Voronezh	5./JG 77	54	17 September 1942	05:57	Il-2	PQ 92122; 30 km (19 mi) north of Voronezh	5./JG 77
29	31 July 1942	15:50	Il-2	PQ 83761; 60 km (37 mi) south-southwest of Yelets	5./JG 77	55	18 September 1942	17:16	MiG-1	PQ 92173; 15 km (9.3 mi) north of Voronezh	5./JG 77
30	5 August 1942	08:46	Hurricane	PQ 83463; 25 km (16 mi) east of Yelets	5./JG 77	56	18 September 1942	17:19	MiG-1	PQ 92312; 10 km (6.2 mi) east of Voronezh	5./JG 77
31♠	6 August 1942	10:25	Pe-2	PQ 93314; 25 km (16 mi) west-northwest of Lipetsk	5./JG 77	57	18 September 1942	17:24	MiG-1	PQ 92443; 25 km (16 mi) east of Voronezh	5./JG 77
32♠	6 August 1942	11:11	MiG-1	PQ 83852; 60 km (37 mi) north-northwest of Voronezh	5./JG 77	58	22 September 1942	15:33	Il-2	PQ 92152 vicinity of Devitsa	5./JG 77
33♠	6 August 1942	11:13	MiG-1	PQ 83892; 50 km (31 mi) north-northwest of Voronezh	5./JG 77	59	22 September 1942	15:37	LaGG-3	PQ 92352; 10 km (6.2 mi) east of Voronezh	5./JG 77
34♠	6 August 1942	18:05	Pe-2	PQ 82174; 65 km (40 mi) east-northeast of Tim	5./JG 77	60	1 October 1942	15:38	LaGG-3	PQ 92454; 40 km (25 mi) east of Voronezh	5./JG 77
35♠	6 August 1942	18:06	Pe-2	PQ 82142; 65 km (40 mi) east-northeast of Tim	5./JG 77						
– Claims with Jagdgeschwader 77 on the Western Front – Mediterranean Theater, North Africa — 1 January – May 1943
61? (Note: This claim is not listed by Mathews and Foreman.)	26 March 1943	10:37	Spitfire	28 km (17 mi) southwest of El Hamma	5./JG 77	67	7 April 1943	09:10	Spitfire	5 km (3.1 mi) southeast of Skhira	5./JG 77
62	31 March 1943	18:49	P-40	9 km (5.6 mi) southeast of El Guettar	5./JG 77	68	20 April 1943	17:15	P-51	15 km (9.3 mi) southwest of Mateur	5./JG 77
63	1 April 1943	10:42	Spitfire	62 km (39 mi) northwest of La Fauconnerie	5./JG 77	69	21 April 1943	09:28	Spitfire	20 km (12 mi) southwest of Tunis	5./JG 77
64	2 April 1943	19:12	Boston	32 km (20 mi) northwest of Gafsa	5./JG 77	70	21 April 1943	12:58	P-40	40 km (25 mi) east of Tunis	5./JG 77
65	4 April 1943	17:17	Spitfire	25 km (16 mi) northeast of Meknassy	5./JG 77	71	25 April 1943	13:05	Spitfire	5 km (3.1 mi) north of Majaz al Bab	5./JG 77
66	6 April 1943	15:28	Spitfire	60 km (37 mi) southwest of La Fauconnerie	5./JG 77						
– Claims with Jagdgeschwader 77 on the Western Front – Mediterranean Theater, Italy — May/June 1944
72	31 May 1944	17:09	Spitfire	PQ 14 Ost S/2372, Tuscania	1./JG 77	74	9 June 1944	09:23	P-51	20 km (12 mi) southwest of Udine	2./JG 77
73	31 May 1944	17:12	Spitfire	PQ 14 Ost S/2375	1./JG 77						
– Claims with Jagdgeschwader 53 on the Western Front – Defense of the Reich — August – 12 December 1944
75	26 August 1944	15:07	P-47	PQ 05 Ost TC-4/2; Rouen	6./JG 53	79	25 November 1944	12:42	P-51	PQ 04 Ost N/AQ-6/3; Haguenau	6./JG 53
76	2 October 1944	15:07? (Note: According to Mathews and Foreman claimed at 15:39.)	P-51	PQ 04 Ost N/BN-9 north of Vézelise/Nancy	6./JG 53	80	1 December 1944	16:00	P-51	PQ 04 Ost N/AR-5, southwest of Rastatt	6./JG 53
77	6 October 1944	16:53	P-47	PQ 04 Ost N/FN-5/1; Thionville	6./JG 53	81	12 December 1944	14:02	P-47	PQ 05 Ost UR-4; Linkenheim	6./JG 53
78	20 October 1944	10:50	P-47	PQ 04 Ost N/CP southwest of Strasbourg	6./JG 53						

=== Awards ===
- Iron Cross (1939) 2nd and 1st Class
- Honor Goblet of the Luftwaffe on 13 September 1942 as Unteroffizier and pilot
- German Cross in Gold on 3 October 1942 as Unteroffizier in the II./Jagdgeschwader 77
- Knight's Cross of the Iron Cross on 14 October 1942 as Unteroffizier and pilot in the 5./Jagdgeschwader 77
