= Voake =

Voake is a surname. Notable people with the surname include:

- Charlotte Voake (born 1957), Welsh children's book illustrator
- Steve Voake, English children's author

== See also ==
- Volke
