= Lutz-Wilhelm Burckhardt =

German World War II fighter pilot

- Born: 5 February 1919; Bremen
- Died: 2 January 1993 (aged 73); Bollschweil
- Military career
- Allegiance: Nazi Germany (to 1945); West Germany
- Branch: Luftwaffe; German Air Force
- Rank: Hauptmann (Wehrmacht); Oberstleutnant (Bundeswehr)
- Nickname: "Lutz"
- Units: JG 77, JGr Süd, JG 1, EJG 2
- Commands: I./JG 77
- Conflicts: World War II: Siege of Sevastopol (1941–1942); North African Campaign; Italian Campaign; Defense of the Reich
- Awards: Knight's Cross of the Iron Cross

Ludwig-Wilhelm "Lutz" Burckhardt (Note: According to Scherzer his name is Ludwig-Wilhelm Burkhardt.) (5 February 1919 – 2 January 1993) was a German Luftwaffe military aviator during World War II, a fighter ace credited with 57, potentially up to 69 enemy aircraft shot down, the majority of which claimed on the Eastern Front. He was "ace-in-a-day" once, shooting down five or more aircraft on a single day.

Born in Bremen, Burckhardt initially served with the anti-aircraft artillery of the Luftwaffe. Upon his request in 1940, he transferred to the Jagdwaffe (fighter force). Following flight training, he was posted to Jagdgeschwader 77 (JG 77—77th Fighter Wing). Flying with this wing, Burckhardt claimed his first aerial victory on 9 May 1942 on the Eastern Front. He was awarded the Knight's Cross of the Iron Cross on 15 October 1942 made Staffelkapitän (squadron leader) of 4. Staffel (4th squadron) of JG 77 in November 1942. In August 1943, Burckhardt was appointed Gruppenkommandeur (group commander) of I. Gruppe of JG 77. In December 1943, he was transferred to Jagdgeschwader 1 (JG 1–1st Fighter Wing), a unit fighting on the Western Front in defense of the Reich. In March 1945, Burckhardt commanded II. Gruppe of Jagdgeschwader 7 "Nowotny" (JG 7—7th Fighter Wing), a jet fighter unit. Following World War II, Burckhard served in the West German Air Force and died on 2 January 1993 in Bollschweil, West Germany.

== Career ==
Burckhardt was born on 5 February 1919 in Bremen, at the time a federated state of the Weimar Republic. He began his military with the anti-aircraft artillery of the Luftwaffe, serving with this branch until June 1940. Following flight training, (Note: Flight training in the Luftwaffe progressed through the levels A1, A2 and B1, B2, referred to as A/B flight training. A training included theoretical and practical training in aerobatics, navigation, long-distance flights and dead-stick landings. The B courses included high-altitude flights, instrument flights, night landings and training to handle the aircraft in difficult situations.) Burckhardt served with Ergänzungsgruppe, a supplementary training unit, of Jagdgeschwader 77 (JG 77—77th Fighter Wing). On 29 November 1941, this unit was ordered to relocate to North Africa and flew from Bucharest Pipera Airfield via Sofia to Saloniki. The next day, the Ergänzungsgruppe continued their journey and moved to Athens where they stayed for two days when their orders were cancelled, returning to Bucharest Pipera Airfield on 3 December. In April 1942, Burckhardt was transferred to the Gruppenstab (headquarters unit) of II. Gruppe (2nd group) of JG 77, at the time based at Sarabus on the Eastern Front and fighting in the Crimean campaign. There on 29 April, he crash landed his Messerschmitt Bf 109 F-4 (Werknummer 7602—factory number) at Sarabus due to technical failures of the aircraft. On 1 May, II. Gruppe moved to an airfield named Fernheim, located on the Sea of Azov, approximately 15 kilometers (9.3 miles) west-northwest of Kirovske. Operating from Fernheim on 3 May, Burckhardt claimed his first aerial victory, a Polikarpov I-153 fighter, over the Kerch Strait during the Battle of the Kerch Peninsula. (Note: According to Prien, Stemmer, Rodeike and Bock published in 2006, the first aerial victory was claimed on 9 May 1942. This is also the date presented by Mathews and Foreman. Prien, in his 1993 publication which cites Burckhardt's flight book, does not mention an aerial victory claim by Burckhardt on 9 May 1942.) On 14 July following aerial combat with Ilyushin Il-2 ground-attack aircraft, Burckhardt was forced to make a landing with a partially deployed landing gear, resulting in minor damage to his Bf 109 F-4 (Werknummer 13172).

Burckhardt flew his last mission on the Eastern Front on 2 October, shortly after he fell ill with jaundice and was hospitalized. On 12 November, Burckhardt was appointed Staffelkapitän (squadron leader) of 4. Staffel of JG 77, succeeding Hauptmann Heinrich Setz who had been transferred. On 5 December, II. Gruppe moved to North Africa where they were based at Zarzur. On 7 January 1943, Burckhardt claimed a Supermarine Spitfire fighter shot down south-southeast of Buerat. His opponent may have belonged to the Royal Air Force No. 92 Squadron. Three days later, he stepped on land mine at Zarzur and was injured. In consequence, Oberleutnant Heinrich Osswald replaced him as Staffelkapitän. Following convalescence, Burckhardt was appointed Gruppenkommandeur (group commander) of I. Gruppe of JG 77 on 19 August. He succeeded Oberleutnant Armin Köhler who had temporarily led the Gruppe after Major Heinz Bär had been transferred on 6 August.

=== Defense of the Reich ===
On 22 December 1943, the commanding officer of 6. Staffel of Jagdgeschwader 1 (JG 1–1st Fighter Wing), Hauptmann Harry Koch, was killed in action. In consequence, Burckhardt was transferred to JG 1, taking command of 6. Staffel as Staffelkapitän on 25 December. According to the authors Prien and Rodeike, this transfer was considered a demotion and disciplinary action, a measure for redemption in combat. The authors state, that particularly Oberstleutnant Johannes Steinhoff, the commander of JG 77 at the time, had a number of pilots transferred to JG 1 for redemption in defense of the Reich combat, this measure included pilots Burckhardt, Bär, Leutnant Ernst-Wilhelm Reinert, Oberfeldwebel Alexander Preinfalk, and Oberfeldwebel Herbert Kaiser. In consequence, command of I. Gruppe of JG 77 was passed to Hauptmann Theo Lindemann.

On 19 February 1944, Burckhardt was transferred to III. Gruppe of JG 1 where was given command of 7. Staffel. Command of his former 6. Staffel was then given to the previously demoted Bär. Burckhardt had requested transfer to III. Gruppe, the reason for this request was that Burckhardt had difficulties adapting to the Focke-Wulf Fw 190 while III. Gruppe was still operating the Bf 109. On 22 April, the United States Army Air Forces (USAAF) Eighth Air Force sent 803 heavy bombers against German ground transportation, primarily targeting the marshaling yard in Hamm. JG 1 was scrambled at 17:45 and vectored to vectored to a point of intercept over the Rothaar Mountains where III. Gruppe ran into a large formation of North American P-51 Mustang fighters. For the loss of twelve of their own, III. Gruppe pilots claimed four P-51 fighters shot down, including one by Burckhardt. In this encounter, Burckhardt was also shot down near Edersee Dam. Forced to bail out of his Bf 109 G at low altitude, he came under immediate fire by strafing fighters, but was unhurt.

On 2 July, Burckhardt fell ill with Malaria and had to be taken off combat duties. Following various staff positions, he was transferred to III. Gruppe of Ergänzungs-Jagdgeschwader 2 (EJG 2—2nd Supplementary Fighter Wing) in early 1945 for conversion training to the then new Messerschmitt Me 262 jet aircraft. Command of 7. Staffel was then given to Oberleutnant Fritz Bilfinger. In early March, Burckhardt commanded II. Gruppe of Jagdgeschwader 7 "Nowotny" (JG 7—7th Fighter Wing) at Neumünster airfield in northern Germany. JG 7 "Nowotny" was the first operational jet fighter wing in the world and was named after Walter Nowotny, who was killed in action on 8 November 1944. Nowotny, a fighter pilot credited with 258 aerial victories and recipient of the Knight's Cross of the Iron Cross with Oak Leaves, Swords and Diamonds (Ritterkreuz des Eisernen Kreuzes mit Eichenlaub, Schwertern und Brillanten), had been assessing the Me 262 under operational conditions. II. Gruppe had just been formed in February 1945 under the command of Major Hermann Staiger.

== Later life ==
Following World War II, Burckhardt reentered military service in the Bundeswehr as an Oberstleutnant in the West German Air Force, at the time referred to as the Bundesluftwaffe. Burckhardt died on 2 January 1993 at the age of 73 in Bollschweil, West Germany.

== Summary of career ==
=== Aerial victory claims ===
According to US historian David T. Zabecki, Burckhardt was credited with 69 aerial victories. Obermaier lists him with 58 aerial victories claimed in 245 combat missions. While Dixon lists him with 57 aerial victories claimed in 254 combat missions. Mathews and Foreman, authors of Luftwaffe Aces — Biographies and Victory Claims, researched the German Federal Archives and found documentation for more than 57 aerial victory claims, including 53 claims on the Eastern Front and at least four claims over the Western Allies.

Victory claims were logged to a map-reference (PQ = Planquadrat), for example "PQ 35392". The Luftwaffe grid map (Jägermeldenetz) covered all of Europe, western Russia and North Africa and was composed of rectangles measuring 15 minutes of latitude by 30 minutes of longitude, an area of about 360 square miles (930 km^{2}). These sectors were then subdivided into 36 smaller units to give a location area 3 km × 4 km (1.9 mi × 2.5 mi) in size.

Chronicle of aerial victories
This and the ♠ (Ace of spades) indicates those aerial victories which made Burckhardt an "ace-in-a-day", a term which designates a fighter pilot who has shot down five or more airplanes in one day. This and the – (dash) indicates unconfirmed aerial victory claims for which Burckhardt did not receive credit. This and the ? (question mark) indicates information discrepancies listed by Prien, Stemmer, Rodeike, Bock, Mathews and Foreman.
| Claim | Date | Time | Type | Location | Unit | Claim | Date | Time | Type | Location | Unit |
– Claims with Jagdgeschwader 77 on the Eastern Front – Kerch, Sevastopol, Izium — May/June 1942
| 1 | 9 May 1942 | 12:38 | I-153 | | Stab II./JG 77 | 6 | 18 May 1942 | 16:12 | R-5 | | Stab II./JG 77 |
| 2 | 12 May 1942 | 16:02 | Il-2 | | Stab II./JG 77 | 7 | 8 June 1942 | 13:14 | I-16 | PQ 35392, Sevastopol | Stab II./JG 77 |
| 3 | 13 May 1942 | 08:09 | II-2 | | Stab II./JG 77 | 8 | 8 June 1942 | 16:52 | MiG-1 | PQ 35363 | Stab II./JG 77 |
| 4 | 17 May 1942 | 13:32 | I-153 | | Stab II./JG 77 | 9 | 17 June 1942 | 07:28 | LaGG-3 | | 6./JG 77 |
| 5 | 17 May 1942 | 13:55 | I-16 | | Stab II./JG 77 | | | | | | |
– Claims with Jagdgeschwader 77 on the Eastern Front – Summer offensive — 28 June – 7 November 1942
| 10 | 5 July 1942 | 13:55 | I-180 (Yak-7) | | 6./JG 77 | 32 | 31 July 1942 | 17:02 | Il-2 | PQ 92344 vicinity of Voronezh | 6./JG 77 |
| 11 | 6 July 1942 | 03:58 | LaGG-3 | | 6./JG 77 | 33 | 31 July 1942 | 17:10 | MiG-1 | PQ 92154; 25 km (16 mi) north of Voronezh | 6./JG 77 |
| 12 | 8 July 1942 | 12:40 | LaGG-3 | | 6./JG 77 | 34 | 8 August 1942 | 06:21 | LaGG-3 | PQ 92471; 25 km (16 mi) southeast of Voronezh | 6./JG 77 |
| 13 | 8 July 1942 | 16:40 | Il-2 | | 6./JG 77 | 35 | 8 August 1942 | 06:36 | LaGG-3 | PQ 92442; 25 km (16 mi) east of Voronezh | 6./JG 77 |
| 14 | 9 July 1942 | 12:20 | LaGG-3 | | 6./JG 77 | 36 | 13 August 1942 | 08:48 | LaGG-3 | PQ 93771; 50 km (31 mi) north of Voronezh | 6./JG 77 |
| 15 | 9 July 1942 | 16:08 | LaGG-3 | | 6./JG 77 | 37 | 13 August 1942 | 09:00 | LaGG-3 | PQ 93791; 50 km (31 mi) north-northeast of Voronezh | 6./JG 77 |
| 16♠ | 12 July 1942 | 06:38 | LaGG-3 | | 6./JG 77 | 38 | 13 August 1942 | 13:44 | LaGG-3 | PQ 83723; 50 km (31 mi) south-southwest of Yelets | 6./JG 77 |
| 17♠ | 12 July 1942 | 06:45 | LaGG-3 | | 6./JG 77 | 39 | 13 August 1942 | 13:52 | LaGG-3 | PQ 93511; 30 km (19 mi) west-southwest of Lipetsk | 6./JG 77 |
| 18♠ | 12 July 1942 | 06:52 | MiG-3 | | 6./JG 77 | 40 | 14 August 1942 | 14:00 | Il-2 | | 6./JG 77 |
| 19♠ | 12 July 1942 | 10:48 | Il-2 | | 6./JG 77 | 41 | 16 August 1942 | 17:52 | Il-2 | PQ 83811; 50 km (31 mi) north-northeast of Voronezh | 6./JG 77 |
| 20♠ | 12 July 1942 | 10:53 | Il-2 | | 6./JG 77 | 42 | 18 August 1942 | 15:11 | Pe-2 | PQ 93782 | 6./JG 77 |
| 21♠ | 12 July 1942 | 10:55 | Il-2 | | 6./JG 77 | 43 | 18 August 1942 | 17:10? (Note: According to Mathews and Foreman claimed at 17:16.) | LaGG-3 | PQ 82272; 45 km (28 mi) west-northwest of Voronezh | 6./JG 77 |
| 22 | 13 July 1942 | 09:25 | LaGG-3 | | 6./JG 77 | 44 | 18 August 1942 | 17:19 | LaGG-3 | PQ 82263; 25 km (16 mi) north-northwest of Voronezh | 6./JG 77 |
| 23 | 13 July 1942 | 14:10 | LaGG-3 | | 6./JG 77 | 45 | 3 September 1942 | 04:51 | LaGG-3 | PQ 93873; 55 km (34 mi) northeast of Voronezh | 6./JG 77 |
| 24 | 13 July 1942 | 14:13 | LaGG-3 | | 6./JG 77 | 46 | 12 September 1942 | 12:48 | LaGG-3 | PQ 92811; 20 km (12 mi) north of Sloboda | 6./JG 77 |
| 25 | 13 July 1942 | 19:35 | Il-2 | | 6./JG 77 | 47 | 14 September 1942 | 12:09? (Note: According to Mathews and Foreman claimed at 02:09.) | P-39 | PQ 92513 | 6./JG 77 |
| 26 | 15 July 1942 | 16:48 | R-5 | | 6./JG 77 | 48 | 15 September 1942 | 06:54 | LaGG-3 | PQ 92323; 10 km (6.2 mi) north of Voronezh | 6./JG 77 |
| 27 | 20 July 1942 | 13:59 | LaGG-3 | | 6./JG 77 | 49 | 15 September 1942 | 07:04 | LaGG-3 | PQ 92183; 15 km (9.3 mi) north of Voronezh | 6./JG 77 |
| 28 | 23 July 1942 | 15:52 | Il-2 | | 6./JG 77 | 50 | 15 September 1942 | 07:08 | Pe-2 | PQ 82763; 25 km (16 mi) north-northwest of Voronezh | 6./JG 77 |
| 29 | 23 July 1942 | 15:58 | Il-2 | PQ 82222; 45 km (28 mi) northwest of Voronezh | 6./JG 77 | 51 | 20 September 1942 | 09:45 | Il-2 | PQ 92153; 25 km (16 mi) north of Voronezh | 6./JG 77 |
| 30 | 23 July 1942 | 16:00 | Il-2 | PQ 83881; 50 km (31 mi) north-northwest of Voronezh | 6./JG 77 | 52 | 20 September 1942 | 09:48 | Il-2 | PQ 92223; 50 km (31 mi) northeast of Voronezh | 6./JG 77 |
| 31 | 25 July 1942? (Note: According to Mathews and Foreman claimed on 24 July 1942.) | 13:53 | MiG-3 | | 6./JG 77 | 53 | 22 September 1942 | 16:22 | LaGG-3 | PQ 92133; 40 km (25 mi) north-northeast of Voronezh | 6./JG 77 |
– Claims with Jagdgeschwader 77 on the Western Front – Mediterranean Theater, North Africa — 1 – 10 January 1943
| 54 | 7 January 1943 | 12:05 | Spitfire | 50 km (31 mi) south-southeast of Buerat | 4./JG 77 | | | | | | |
– Claims with Jagdgeschwader 77 on the Western Front – Mediterranean Theater, Italy — 19 August – December 1943
| 55 | 16 September 1943 | 18:28 | Spitfire | east of Salerno | Stab I./JG 77 | — | 17 November 1943 | — | P-51 | Corsica | Stab I./JG 77 |
| — | 16 October 1943 | 09:30 | Spitfire | Volturno | Stab I./JG 77 | | | | | | |
– Claims with Jagdgeschwader 1 on the Western Front – Defense of the Reich — January – 5 June 1944
| 56 | 2 March 1944 | 14:30 | P-47 | PQ 05 Ost S/PM, south of Verviers | 7./JG 1 | — | 4 May 1944 | — | P-47 | | 7./JG 1 |
| — | 23 March 1944 | — | P-47 | | 7./JG 1 | — | 7 May 1944 | — | P-47 | | 7./JG 1 |
| — | 9 April 1944 | — | P-47 | | 7./JG 1 | — | 22 May 1944 | — | P-51 | | 7./JG 1 |
| — | 11 April 1944 | — | P-51 | | 7./JG 1 | — | 22 May 1944 | — | P-38 | | 7./JG 1 |
| 57? (Note: This claim is not listed by Mathews and Foreman.) | 13 April 1944 | 14:10 | P-51 | PQ 05 Ost S/RT | 7./JG 1 | — | 29 May 1944 | — | P-47 | | 7./JG 1 |
| 58 | 22 April 1944 | 18:10 | P-51 | PQ 05 Ost S/LS-9, northeast of the Rothaar Mountains | 7./JG 1 | | | | | | |
– Claims with Jagdgeschwader 1 on the Western Front – Invasion of France — 6 June – 2 July 1944
| — | 10 June 1944 | — | P-51 | | 7./JG 1 | | | | | | |

=== Awards ===
- Iron Cross (1939) 2nd and 1st Class
- Knight's Cross of the Iron Cross on 15 October 1942 as Leutnant and pilot in the 4./Jagdgeschwader 77 (Note: According to Scherzer as pilot in the 6./Jagdgeschwader 77.)
- Honor Goblet of the Luftwaffe on 19 October 1942 as Leutnant and pilot
