= Herbert Kaiser =

German fighter ace and Knight's Cross recipient (1916–2003)

- Born: Herbert Höhne; 16 March 1916; Jessen, German Empire
- Died: 5 December 2003 (aged 87); Felde, Germany
- Military career
- Allegiance: Nazi Germany (to 1945); West Germany
- Branch: Luftwaffe; German Air Force
- Rank: Leutnant (Wehrmacht); Oberstleutnant (Bundeswehr)
- Units: JG 77, JG 1, JV 44
- Conflicts: World War II: Annexation of the Sudetenland; Battle of the Netherlands; Battle of Belgium; Battle of France; Balkans Campaign; Battle of Crete; Operation Barbarossa; North African Campaign; Italian Campaign; Defense of the Reich
- Awards: Knight's Cross of the Iron Cross

Herbert Kaiser (16 March 1916 – 5 December 2003) was a Luftwaffe ace and recipient of the Knight's Cross of the Iron Cross during World War II. The Knight's Cross of the Iron Cross, and its variants were the highest awards in the military and paramilitary forces of Nazi Germany during World War II. He was captured by American troops in May 1945. During his career, he flew 1,200 missions and is credited with 68 aerial victories.

== Early life and career ==
Kaiser was born on 16 March 1916 in Jessen in the Province of Saxony within the German Empire. Until 1942, his last name was Höhne, he then changed it to Kaiser.

In mid 1938, Kaiser was posted to I. Gruppe (1st group) of Jagdgeschwader 136 (JG 136—136th Fighter Wing). On 1 November, elements of I./136 formed the new II. Gruppe of Jagdggruppe 186 (II./186—186th Fighter Group), to which Kaiser was posted. This group, also known as the Trägerjagdgruppe (Carrier Fighter Group), was destined to be stationed on the aircraft carrier Graf Zeppelin which was never completed. II./186 (T) initially consisted of two squadrons, 4./186 (T) equipped with the Junkers Ju 87 dive bomber, (Note: The suffix 'T' denotes Träger (carrier) in German use.) and 6./186 (T). On 15 July 1939, II./186 (T) was augmented by a third squadron, designated 5./186 (T) to which Kaiser was assigned.

== World War II ==
World War II in Europe began on Friday, 1 September 1939, when German forces invaded Poland. In preparation, 5./186 (T) had been moved to Brüsterort, near Königsberg on 22 August. In the early morning hours of 1 September, 5./186 (T) flew its first combat missions, providing fighter protection for 4./186 (T) attacking the naval base of the Polish Navy at Hel and for the old German battleship Schleswig-Holstein bombarding the Polish military transit depot at Westerplatte in the Free City of Danzig on the Baltic Sea. The next, II./186 (T) flew further bomber escort missions and was withdrawn from this theater on 6 September, relocating to Hage, East Frisia.

On 10 May 1940, the opening day of the Battle of France, Kaiser claimed two Dutch Fokker D.XXI fighters shot down. In support of Operation Weserübung, the Germany assault on Denmark and Norway, II./186 (T) was ordered to relocate to Norway on 2 June. There it augmented II. Gruppe of Jagdgeschwader 77 (JG 77—77th Fighter Wing) and was based at Trondheim.

Following the decision by Adolf Hitler to halt work on the aircraft carrier Graf Zeppelin, II./186 (T) was redesignated and became the III. Gruppe of JG 77. In consequence, Kaiser's Staffel 5./186 (T) became the 8. Staffel of JG 77 which was headed by Oberleutnant Lorenz Weber. A week later, III. Gruppe was withdrawn from this theater of operations and relocated to Döberitz where it was tasked with fighter protection of Berlin. In November, JG 77 was ordered to the English Channel to continue fighting the Royal Air Force (RAF) in the aftermath of the Battle of Britain. 8. Staffel moved to an airfield at Cherbourg-en-Cotentin on 30 November.

In preparation for Operation Marita, the German invasion of Greece, III. Gruppe of JG 77 was moved to Deta in western Romania on 4 April 1941. On 16 April, III. Gruppe had relocated to an airfield at Korinos, three days later the Gruppe moved to Larissa, reaching Almyros further south on 22 April. The following day, eight Messerschmitt Bf 109 fighters from III. Gruppe escorted Dornier Do 17 bombers from Kampfgeschwader 2 (KG 2—2nd Bomber Wing) to Argos. On this mission, Kaiser claimed a Westland Lysander aircraft shot down.

=== Eastern Front ===
In preparation for Operation Barbarossa, the German invasion of the Soviet Union, III. Gruppe was moved to Bucharest and was located in the sector of Heeresgruppe Süd (Army Group South). III. Gruppe arrived in Bucharest on 16 June. Four days later, III. Gruppe moved to Roman. That evening, the pilots and ground crews were briefed of the upcoming invasion of the Soviet Union, which opened the Eastern Front.

In November 1941, Oberst Werner Mölders, the General der Jagdflieger, personally directed fighter and dive bomber operations on the Crimea. On 9 November 1941, Mölders took Kaiser on a "teaching" mission against a formation of Ilyushin Il-2 ground-attack aircraft, showing Kaiser how to shoot them down.

Kaiser later recalled: "He positioned himself off to one side of-and some distance away from-the last Il-2 in a formation of six. He then turned in quickly and opened fire at the enemy's cockpit from an angle of some 30 degrees. The Il-2 immediately burst into flames and crashed. 'Do you see how it's done?', Oberst Mölders' voice came over the R/T. 'Right, now you take the next one.' I carried out the same maneuver and, sure enough, the next Il-2 went down on fire. 'And again!' It was like being on a training flight. Another short burst and the third Il-2 was ablaze. The whole lesson had lasted no more than 12 minutes!" In this way, Kaiser scored his 23rd and 24th kills. But because Mölders was officially banned from operational flying, the first Soviet aircraft was never officially credited to him.

=== Mediterranean Theater ===
On 23 October 1942, the British Eighth Army launched the Second Battle of El Alamein. Preceding this attack, the Luftwaffe had already planned to replace Jagdgeschwader 27 (JG 27—27th Fighter Wing), which had been fighting in North African theater, with JG 77. In preparation for this rotation, III. Gruppe of JG 77 was moved to Munich on 19 October where it was equipped with the Bf 109 G-2/trop. On 23 and 24 October, the Gruppe moved to Bari in southern Italy. The Gruppe then relocated to Tobruk Airfield on 26 October. The following day, the Gruppe moved to an airfield at Tanyet-Harun.

On 27 October, Kaiser attacked six Curtiss P-40 Warhawk fighters strafing vehicles on the Via Balbia. Attacking the rearmost P-40, he claimed it shot down. While attacking a second P-40, his Bf 109 G-2 (Werknummer 10640—factory number) was hit in the engine and oil cooler, resulting in a forced landing near Mersa Matruh, in a location approximately 15 kilometers (9.3 miles) south of the Via Balbia. His wingman, observed the crash and reported him killed in action. Two days later, Kaiser returned to JG 77 on foot. Consequently, Kaiser was credited with JG 77's first two aerial victories over North Africa. On 31 October, Kaiser claimed another P-40 shot down, and yet another on 3 November. The following day at 07:10, he claimed a Hawker Hurricane fighter destroyed.

On 8 January 1943, Kaiser claimed a Lockheed P-38 Lightning fighter shot down. The authors Shores, Massimello and Guest speculate if the claim relates to the previous day combat. On 7 January, the United States Army Air Forces (USAAF) Twelfth Air Force attacked Tripoli with a formation of Boeing B-17 Flying Fortress bombers escorted by P-38 fighters of the 94th Fighter Squadron. The USAAF formation was intercepted by III. Gruppe of JG 77. During this encounter, the P-38 piloted by Lieutenant J.G.H. Lentz was shot down. Kaiser and Oberleutnant Arno Potzel were the only German pilots to have claimed a P-38 shot down. In late January, Kaiser was transferred to Ergänzungsgruppe Süd (Supplementary Fighter Group South) as an instructor. His assignment was made due to medical reasons. The constant strain from combat necessitated a period of rest. The Luftwaffe doctor had grounded him as unfit for combat operations and had him flown on a Heinkel He 111 to the airbase Bordeaux-Mérignac at the Atlantic coast near Bordeaux in France where Ergänzungsgruppe Süd was based. Here, he was awarded the Knight's Cross of the Iron Cross (Ritterkreuz des Eisernen Kreuzes) on 14 March 1943. The presentation was made by Oberstleutnant Alfed Müller, the commander of Ergänzungsgruppe Süd.

Kaiser's tour as an instructor ended on 5 September 1943 when he was transferred to I. Gruppe of JG 77 where he was assigned to 3. Staffel. At the time, the Gruppe was defending the airspace over southern Italy. Based at San Severo, the Staffel was commanded by Leutnant Ernst-Wilhelm Reinert. On 22 November, Kaiser who was then flying with the Gruppenstab of I. Gruppe, claimed a Supermarine Spitfire fighter shot down near Subiaco.

=== Defense of the Reich ===
III./JG 1 emblem

In early April 1944, Kaiser was posted to III. Gruppe of Jagdgeschwader 1 (JG 1–1st Fighter Wing) which was based at an airfield near Paderborn. According to the authors Prien and Rodeike, this transfer was considered a disciplinary action, a measure for redemption in combat. The authors state, that particularly Oberstleutnant Johannes Steinhoff, the commander of JG 77 at the time, had a number of pilots transferred for redemption in defense of the Reich combat, this measure included pilots Kaiser, Major Heinrich Bär, Hauptmann Lutz-Wilhelm Burckhardt, Leutnant Reinert, and Oberfeldwebel Alexander Preinfalk. On 11 April, the USAAF Eighth Air Force sent 917 heavy bombers against the German aircraft industry in Oschersleben, Bernburg, Halberstadt, Sorau, present-day Żary, Poland, Cottbus and Arnimswalde, present-day Załom, Poland. This attack force was escorted by a strong fighter defense. III. Gruppe of JG 1 engaged the escort fighters north of Magdeburg. During this encounter, Kaiser claimed two Republic P-47 Thunderbolt fighters shot down, his first claims with JG 1. On 22 April, the USAAF Eighth Air Force sent 803 heavy bombers against German ground transportation, primarily targeting the marshaling yard in Hamm. JG 1 was scrambled at 17:45 and vectored to a point of intercept over the Rothaar Mountains where III. Gruppe ran into a large formation of North American P-51 Mustang fighters. For the loss of twelve of their own, III. Gruppe pilots claimed four P-51 fighters shot down, including one by Kaiser.

On 6 August 1944, Kaiser was severely wounded during aerial combat with Spitfire fighters north of Paris. Forced to bail out of his Bf 109 G-6 (Werknummer 413577—factory number), his injuries kept him grounded for many months. During the escape from his burning aircraft, he collided with the rudder, breaking his right thigh in multiple places. Following hospitalization in France and Germany, he sent to Bad Wiessee.

Following the dismissal of Generalleutnant Adolf Galland as General der Jagdflieger, Galland was given the opportunity by Hitler to prove his ideas about the Messerschmitt Me 262 jet fighter. He had hoped that the Me 262 would compensate for the numerical superiority of the Allies. In consequence, Galland formed Jagdverband 44 (JV 44—44th Fighter Detachment) at Brandenburg-Briest on 24 February 1945. Galland was also given a carte blanche with respect to staffing and began recruiting his pilots. Kaiser joined this elite unit but his injuries prevented him from flying. Consequently, Kaiser was tasked with directing JV 44's ground operations.

== Later life ==
Following World War II, Kaiser reentered military service in the Bundeswehr as an Oberstleutnant in the West German Air Force, at the time referred to as the Bundesluftwaffe. Kaiser died on 5 December 2003 at the age of 87 in Felde, Germany.

== Summary of career ==
=== Aerial victory claims ===
According to US historian David T. Zabecki, Kaiser was credited with 68 aerial victories. Spick also lists him with 68 aerial victories, 42 of which on the Eastern Front, claimed in approximately 1,000 combat missions. Obermaier also lists him with 68 aerial victories, however claimed in approximately 1,200 combat missions. Mathews and Foreman, authors of Luftwaffe Aces — Biographies and Victory Claims, researched the German Federal Archives and state that Kaiser was credited with more than 50 aerial victory claims, including 39 claims on the Eastern Front and at least eleven claims over the Western Allies.

Victory claims were logged to a map-reference (PQ = Planquadrat), for example "PQ 3716". The Luftwaffe grid map (Jägermeldenetz) covered all of Europe, western Russia and North Africa and was composed of rectangles measuring 15 minutes of latitude by 30 minutes of longitude, an area of about 360 square miles (930 km^{2}). These sectors were then subdivided into 36 smaller units to give a location area 3 km × 4 km (1.9 mi × 2.5 mi) in size.

Chronicle of aerial victories
This and the ? (question mark) indicates information discrepancies listed by Prien, Stemmer, Rodeike, Bock, Mathews and Foreman.
Claim	Date	Time	Type	Location	Claim	Date	Time	Type	Location
– 5. Staffel of Jagdggruppe 186 (Trägergruppe) – "Phoney War" — 6 September 1939 – 9 May 1940
1	5 May 1940	17:30	Blenheim	60 km (37 mi) north of Terschelling					
– 5. Staffel of Jagdggruppe 186 (Trägergruppe) – Battle of France — 10 May – 1 June 1940
2	10 May 1940	06:50	D.XXI	De Kooy	? (Note: This claim is not listed Mathews and Foreman, nor in the 2001 book by Prien, Stemmer, Rodeike and Bock.)	10 May 1940	—	D.XXI	
– 8. Staffel of Jagdgeschwader 77 – Balkans and Crete — 1 April – 1 June 1941
? (Note: This claim is not listed Mathews and Foreman, nor in the 2003 book by Prien, Stemmer, Rodeike and Bock.)	23 April 1941	—	Lysander		3	16 May 1941	16:47	Hurricane	5 km (3.1 mi) southwest of Chania
– 8. Staffel of Jagdgeschwader 77 – Operation Barbarossa — 22 June – 5 December 1941
4	22 June 1941	19:02	ZKB-19? (Note: According to Mathews and Foreman claimed as an Ilyushin DB-3.)		15	29 August 1941	07:12? (Note: According to Mathews and Foreman claimed at 17:12 as a Polikarpov R-5.)	R-Z?	
5	1 July 1941	17:54	I-15		16	1 September 1941	10:51	DB-3	PQ 3716
6	4 July 1941	16:05	Pe-2		17	1 September 1941	17:40	DB-3	
7	5 July 1941	17:58	ZKB-19?		18	1 September 1941	17:41	DB-3	
8	10 July 1941	11:28? (Note: According to Mathews and Foreman claimed at 11:48.)	MiG-3		19	19 October 1941	16:12? (Note: According to Mathews and Foreman claimed at 16:13.)	I-15	
9	10 July 1941	17:45	I-16		20	4 November 1941	16:10	I-153	
10	10 July 1941	17:47	I-16		21	4 November 1941	16:20	Il-2	
11	10 July 1941	17:48	I-16	PQ 972	22? (Note: This claim is not listed by Mathews and Foreman.)	5 November 1941	—	I-15	
12	22 August 1941	10:35	I-15		23?	9 November 1941	—	Il-2	
13	28 August 1941	15:23	R-Z? (Note: According to Mathews and Foreman claimed as a Polikarpov R-5.)		24?	9 November 1941	—	Il-2	
14	29 August 1941	07:00	DB-3		25	3 December 1941	09:50	I-16	
– 8. Staffel of Jagdgeschwader 77 – Eastern Front — 6 December 1941 – 20 March 1942
26	31 December 1941	12:10	DB-3		29	15 January 1942	10:57	DB-3	
27	31 December 1941	12:12	DB-3		30	22 February 1942	12:35	I-15	
28	5 January 1942	11:57	I-153?		31	23 February 1942	11:00	MIG-3	
– 8. Staffel of Jagdgeschwader 77 – Eastern Front — 1 May – June 1942
	12 May 1942	07:07	Su-2 (Seversky)			7 June 1942	12:52	Il-2	PQ 35444
	12 May 1942	07:09	R-Z?			7 June 1942	12:53	Il-2	PQ 35444
? (Note: This claim is listed Mathews and Foreman, and by Prien in his 1995 book. However, it is not listed in the 2006 book by Prien, Stemmer, Rodeike and Bock.)	17 May 1942	08:00	MiG-3		? (Note: This claim is not listed Mathews and Foreman, nor is not listed in the 2006 book by Prien, Stemmer, Rodeike and Bock.)	8 June 1942	—	unknown	
	18 May 1942	16:55	U-2	PQ 6083	?	10 June 1942	—	unknown	
– 9. Staffel of Jagdgeschwader 77 – Eastern Front — July – 16 October 1942
?	4 July 1942	—	unknown			22 July 1942	10:00	Yak-1	
? (Note: This claim is not listed Mathews and Foreman, nor is not listed in the 1995 book by Prien.)	5 July 1942	17:17	Il-2	Kerch		22 July 1942	10:08	Yak-1	
	10 July 1942	09:40	Yak-1	Novorossiysk		23 July 1942	04:50	I-153	
	15 July 1942	08:34	Yak-1			23 July 1942	09:05	U-2	
According to Prien, Stemmer, Rodeike and Bock, Kaiser claimed two additional undocumented aerial victories in the timeframe May to October 1942.
	24 July 1942	07:40	Yak-1						
– 8. Staffel of Jagdgeschwader 77 – Mediterranean Theater, North Africa — 26 October 1942 – January 1943
? (Note: This claim is not listed by Mathews and Foreman.)	27 October 1942	—	P-40	Via Balbia		3 November 1942	14:00? (Note: According to the 1995 book by Prien claimed at 14:00.)	P-40	PQ 81122
?	27 October 1942	—	P-40	15 km (9.3 mi) south of Via Balbia		4 November 1942	07:10	Hurricane	PQ 81143
? (Note: This claim is not listed in the 1995 book by Prien.)	31 October 1942	13:05	P-40	PQ 62631		8 January 1943	—	P-38	
– 3. Staffel of Jagdgeschwader 77 – Mediterranean Theater, Italy — 5 September – 31 December 1943
? (Note: This claim is not listed Mathews and Foreman, nor is not listed in the 2011 book by Prien, Stemmer, Rodeike and Bock.)	13 November 1943	—	Spitfire		?	27 November 1943	—	B-17	
?	22 November 1943	11:05	Spitfire	PQ 14 Ost 3211, vicinity of Subiaco	?	27 November 1943	—	B-17	
– 7. Staffel of Jagdgeschwader 1 – Defense of the Reich — April – 5 June 1944
? (Note: This claim is not listed Mathews and Foreman, nor is not listed in the 2018 book by Prien, Stemmer and Bock.)	11 April 1944	—	P-47		?	24 April 1944	—	P-47	
?	11 April 1944	—	P-47			13 May 1944	13:30	P-47	PQ 15 Ost S/UA-7, vicinity of Neumünster
?	22 April 1944	—	P-51						
– 7. Staffel of Jagdgeschwader 1 – Invasion of France — 6 June – 6 August 1944
	12 July 1944	19:05	Spitfire	PQ 15 West TU; PQ 95 Ost S/UU-7, vicinity of Caen	?	30 July 1944	—	P-47	
	13 July 1944	18:18	Typhoon	PQ 15 West TU-9; PQ 95 Ost S/UU-9, vicinity of Caen					

=== Awards ===
- Iron Cross (1939) 2nd and 1st Class
- Honor Goblet of the Luftwaffe (9 August 1941)
- German Cross in Gold on 30 March 1942 as Leutnant in the 8./Jagdgeschwader 77
- Knight's Cross of the Iron Cross on 14 March 1943 as Oberfeldwebel and pilot in the 8./Jagdgeschwader 77 (later Jagdgeschwader 1) (Note: According to Scherzer as pilot in the 9./Jagdgeschwader 77.)
