= Maximilian Volke =

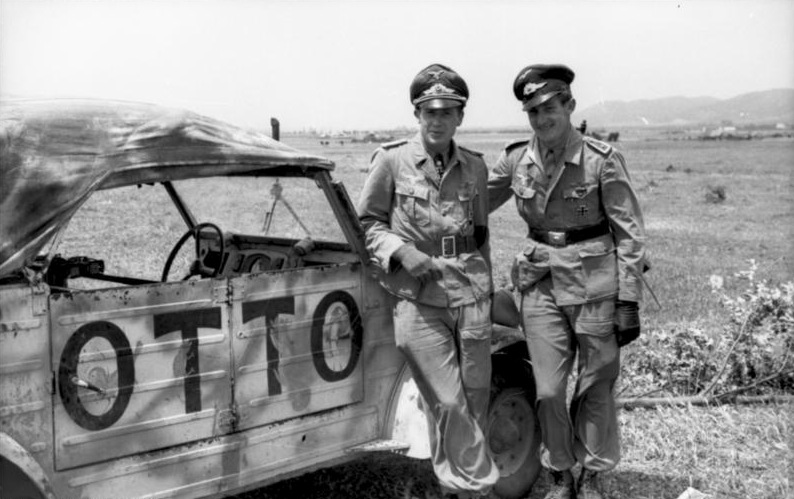
- Leutnant Ernst-Wilhelm Reinert (left) and Feldwebel Maximilian Volke standing next to Hans-Joachim Marseille's "Otto" Kübelwagen, April 1943
- Born: 23 May 1915; Munich, Kingdom of Bavaria
- Died: 5 September 1944 (aged 29); Mirandola, Italy
- Military career
- Allegiance: Nazi Germany
- Branch: Luftwaffe
- Rank: Oberfeldwebel
- Unit: JG 77
- Conflicts: World War II
- Awards: German Cross in Gold

Maximilian Volke (Munich, Kingdom of Bavaria, 23 May 1915 – Mirandola, Italy, 5 September 1944) was a Luftwaffe Oberfeldwebel (flight sergeant) and 36-victory fighter ace of the Jagdgeschwader 77.

Volke was a veteran of the campaigns in Russia and Africa. On 5 September 1944, he was shot down in his Messerschmitt Bf 109 G-6 (Werknummer 441456—factory number) near Mirandola-Cividale. Volke was 29 years and was decorated with the German Cross in Gold, received as Feldwebel in the II./JG 77 on 12 July 1943.

Ofw. Volke's remains and parts of his aircraft were located and dug out of a farmer's field in Mirandola, just north of Modena by an Italian amateur war history research team (the Romagna Air Finders) in July 2007, nearly 63 years after he was shot down.

== Summary of career ==
=== Aerial victory claims ===
Mathews and Foreman, authors of Luftwaffe Aces – Biographies and Victory Claims, researched the German Federal Archives and found records for 36 aerial victory claims. This figure includes 27 aerial victories on the Eastern Front and nine over the Western Allies, including three four-engine bomber.

Victory claims were logged to a map-reference (PQ = Planquadrat), for example "PQ 83763". The Luftwaffe grid map (Jägermeldenetz) covered all of Europe, western Russia and North Africa and was composed of rectangles measuring 15 minutes of latitude by 30 minutes of longitude, an area of about 360 square miles (930 km^{2}). These sectors were then subdivided into 36 smaller units to give a location area 3 km × 4 km (1.9 mi × 2.5 mi) in size.

Chronicle of aerial victories
This and the ? (question mark) indicates information discrepancies listed by Prien, Stemmer, Rodeike, Bock, Mathews and Foreman.
Claim	Date	Time	Type	Location	Claim	Date	Time	Type	Location
– 4. Staffel of Jagdgeschwader 77 – Operation Barbarossa — 22 June – 5 December 1941
1	26 June 1941	14:25	SB-3						
– 4. Staffel of Jagdgeschwader 77 – On the Eastern Front — 17 March – 30 April 1942
2	19 March 1942	12:45	DB-3		3	23 April 1942	13:14	Pe-2	
– 4. Staffel of Jagdgeschwader 77 – On the Eastern Front — 1 May – 7 November 1942
4	13 May 1942	15:24	LaGG-3		16	6 August 1942	18:10	Douglas DB-7 (Boston)	PQ 83763; 60 km (37 mi) south-southwest of Yelets
5	15 May 1942	15:00	Il-2		17	7 August 1942	11:12	LaGG-3	PQ 92471; 25 km (16 mi) southeast of Voronezh
6	16 July 1942	18:02	Yak-1		18	11 August 1942	11:37	LaGG-3	PQ 92364; 20 km (12 mi) east of Voronezh
7	17 July 1942	18:34	Il-2		19	11 August 1942	11:38	LaGG-3	PQ 92353; 10 km (6.2 mi) east of Voronezh
8	19 July 1942	06:22	Pe-2		20	12 August 1942	07:15	Douglas DB-7 (Boston)	PQ 92424; 25 km (16 mi) east of Voronezh
9	19 July 1942	06:23	Pe-2		21	12 August 1942	07:20	Pe-2	PQ 92324; 10 km (6.2 mi) north of Voronezh
10	19 July 1942	06:36	Il-2		22	13 August 1942	10:50	Il-2	PQ 83811; 50 km (31 mi) south of Yelets
11	23 July 1942	04:06	Pe-2		23	13 August 1942	18:14	LaGG-3	PQ 83871, Semljansk; 60 km (37 mi) northwest of Voronezh
12	25 July 1942? (Note: According to Mathews and Foreman claimed on 24 July 1942.)	05:06	Hurricane		24	21 August 1942	11:06	Yak-1	PQ 92783; 20 km (12 mi) west-northwest of Sloboda
13	28 July 1942	07:40	Hurricane	PQ 82231; 40 km (25 mi) north-northwest of Voronezh	25	26 August 1942	05:55	Pe-2	PQ 82274; 45 km (28 mi) west-northwest of Voronezh
14	28 July 1942	15:15? (Note: According to Mathews and Foreman claimed at 15:12.)	Douglas DB-7 (Boston)	PQ 92353; 10 km (6.2 mi) east of Voronezh	26	13 September 1942	10:22	Hurricane	PQ 92594; 30 km (19 mi) north-northwest of Sloboda
15	28 July 1942	15:20	Douglas DB-7 (Boston)	PQ 92354, Voronezh; 10 km (6.2 mi) east of Voronezh	27	13 September 1942	10:27	Yak-1	PQ 92653; 50 km (31 mi) north-northeast of Sloboda
– 4. Staffel of Jagdgeschwader 77 – Mediterranean Theater, North Africa — 1 January – May 1943
28	7 March 1943	12:35	Spitfire	15 km (9.3 mi) southeast of Medenine	31	12 March 1943	14:26	P-38	50 km (31 mi) northwest of Kairouan
29	10 March 1943	16:37	P-40	PQ 03 Ost 94652, 60 km (37 mi) southwest of Gabès	32	13 March 1943	17:52	P-39	15 km (9.3 mi) southeast of La Fauconnerie
30	10 March 1943	16:45	P-40	PQ 03 Ost 94663, 60 km (37 mi) southwest of Gabès; 60 km (37 mi) south-southwest of Gabès	33	7 April 1943	09:00	Spitfire	15 km (9.3 mi) southeast of Skhira
– 6. Staffel of Jagdgeschwader 77 – Mediterranean Theater, Italy — May – 31 December 1943
34	4 July 1943	11:30	B-17	110 km (68 mi) east of Syracuse	36	16 July 1943	13:28	B-24	2 km (1.2 mi) southwest of Santeramo in Colle; 15 km (9.3 mi) south-southwest of Palazzo San Gervasio
35	8 July 1943	12:40	B-17	40 km (25 mi) southwest of Capo Scaramia					

=== Awards ===
- Honor Goblet of the Luftwaffe on 5 June 1943 as Feldwebel and pilot
- German Cross in Gold on 10 July 1944 as Feldwebel in the II./Jagdgeschwader 77
