= Martin Volke =

Czech ice hockey player

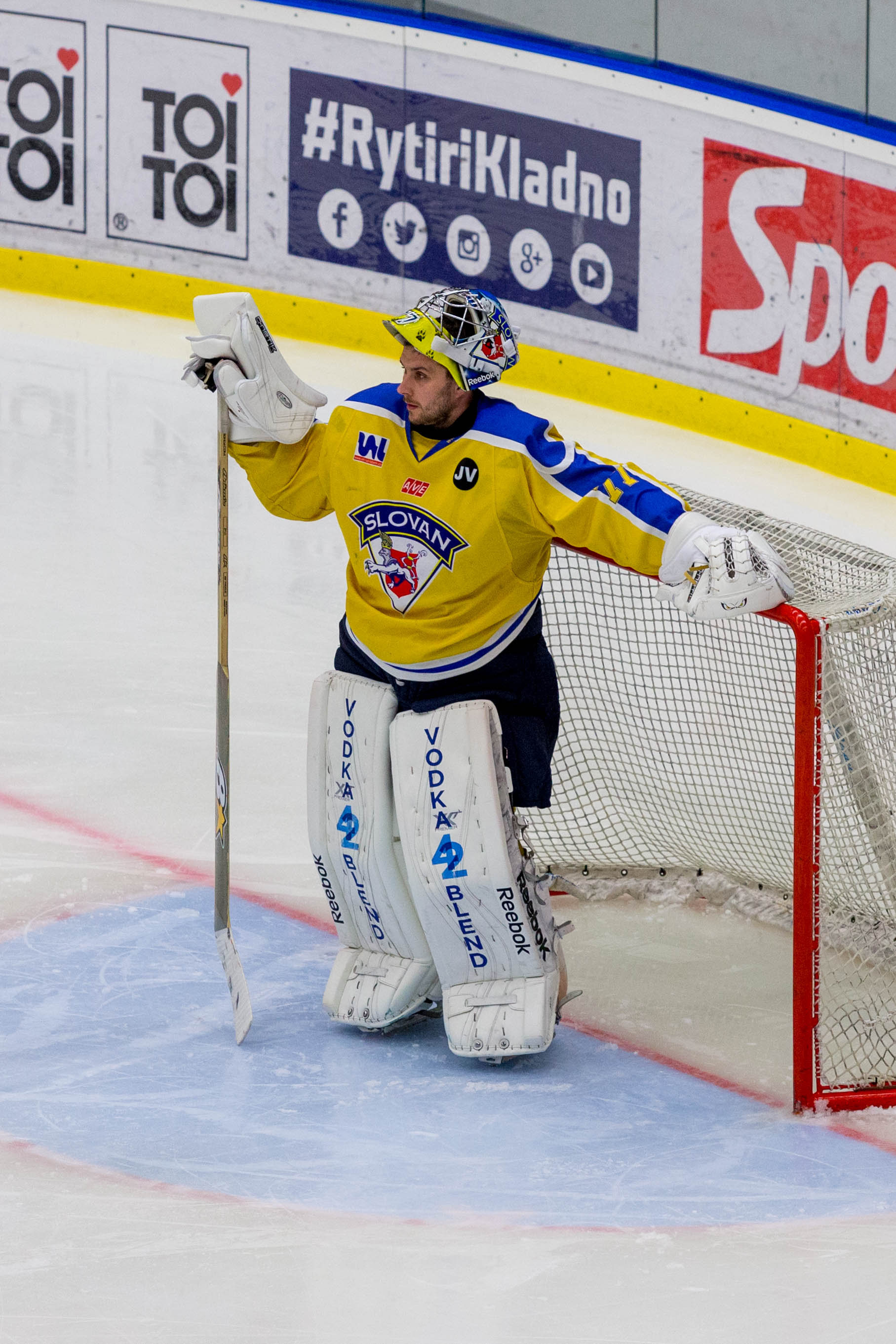
- Born: January 17, 1982 (age 43); Ústí nad Labem, Czechoslovakia
- Height: 6 ft 0 in (183 cm)
- Weight: 176 lb (80 kg; 12 st 8 lb)
- Position: Goaltender
- Caught: Left
- Czech Extraliga team: HC Litvínov
- Playing career: 2007–2020

Martin Volke (born January 17, 1982) is a Czech professional ice hockey goaltender. He played with HC Litvínov in the Czech Extraliga during the 2010–11 Czech Extraliga season.
