= Meknassy =

Coordinates: 34°36′15″N 9°36′20″E

- Commune and town
- Interactive map of Meknassy
- Country: Tunisia
- Governorate: Sidi Bouzid Governorate

Population (2014)
  - Total: 14,844
- Time zone: UTC+1 (CET)

Meknassy (Arabic: المكناسي Al Miknāsī), sometimes spelt Maknassy, is a town and commune in the Sidi Bou Zid Governorate, Tunisia. In 2004 it had a population of 13,742. It is in the governorate of Sidi Bouzid, 120 kilometers west of Sfax, and is a small administrative center (capital of delegation) and a marketing center for agricultural produce from the surrounding area, including fruit.

Its population is explained by the settling of Berber tribes (Confederation of Hammama) who nomadized in this steppe in the region.

The city is internationally known for breeding purebred Arabian horses and an annual festival of Arab thoroughbreds.

== Geology ==
The Meknassy Basin features brittle structures linked to a deep, uneven geometry, forming alternating depressions and uplifts. The movement of Triassic evaporites (halokinesis) started in the Jurassic and persisted through the Cretaceous. Under extensional forces, salt migration influenced sediment deposition and the positioning of structures before compression. Later, during compressional deformation, the reworking of evaporites intensified the folding of uplifts. A detachment zone is present within the Triassic evaporites.

== Population ==
2014 Census (Municipal)
Homes	Families	Males	Females	Total
3475	3207	7484	7289	14773

== See also ==
- List of cities in Tunisia
