= Buerat =

Buerat El Hussoun بويرات الحسون
- Village
- Location in Libya
- Coordinates: 31°23′59″N 15°43′59″E
- Country: Libya
- Region: Tripolitania
- District: Misrata
- Time zone: UTC+2 (EET)

Buerat, or Buerat el Hussoun (Arabic: بويرات الحسون), It is located in western Libya and is the last village in the Misrata municipality from the east, some 90 km (56 mi) west of Sirte.
